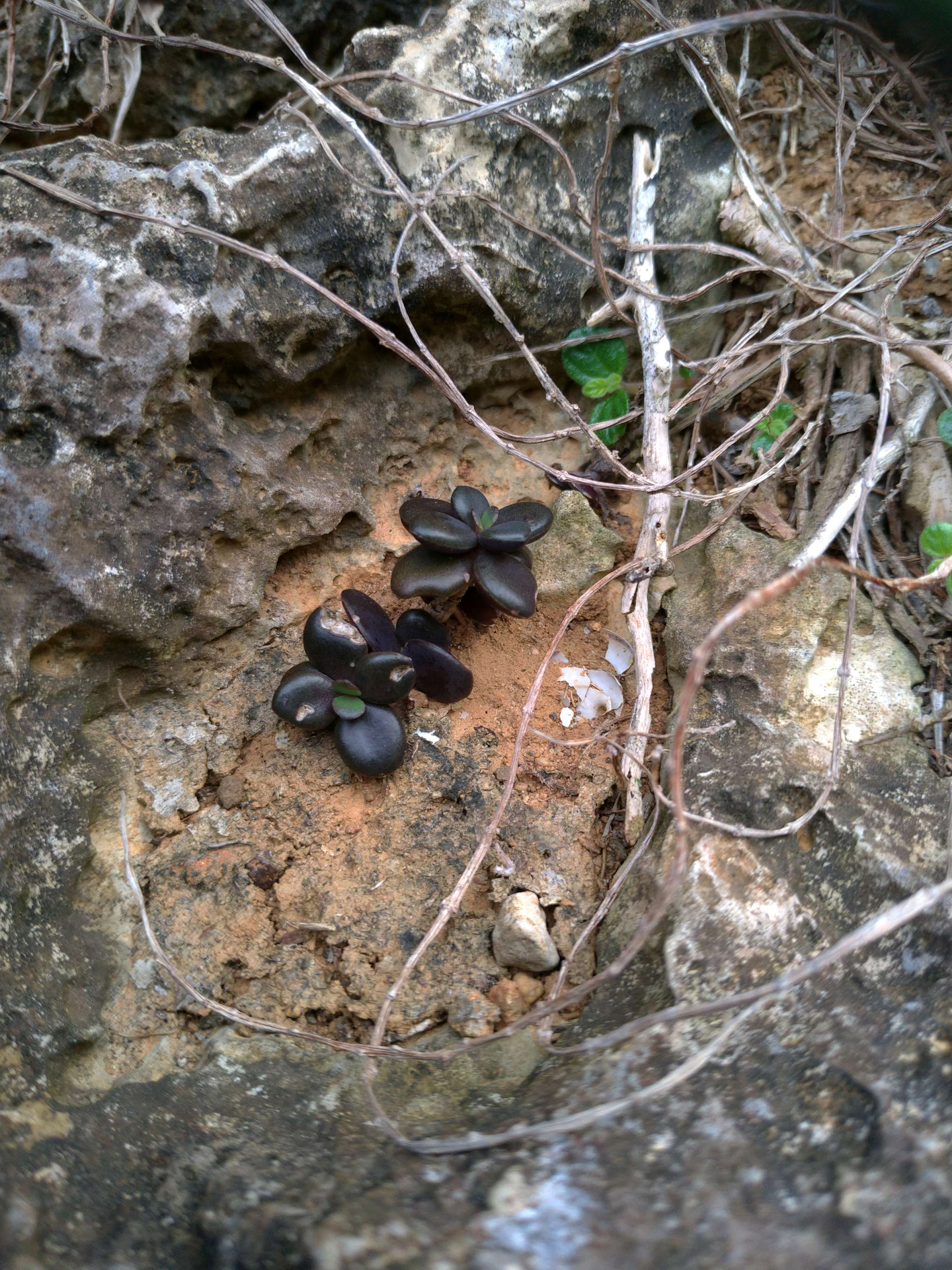

Scientific classification
- Kingdom: Plantae
- Clade: Tracheophytes
- Clade: Angiosperms
- Clade: Eudicots
- Order: Saxifragales
- Family: Crassulaceae
- Genus: Kalanchoe
- Species: K. garambiensis

Binomial name
- Kalanchoe garambiensis Kudo

= Kalanchoe garambiensis =

Species of plant

Kalanchoe garambiensis is a formerly accepted plant species in the succulent genus Kalanchoe, and the family Crassulaceae. It is endemic to Taiwan.

== Taxonomy ==
Kalanchoe garambiensis is considered a synonym of Kalanchoe integra.

== Distribution ==
The plant is found on limestone near coast of Taiwan Kaohsiung and Hengchun Peninsula.

== Plant structure ==
Kalanchoe garambiensis is a perennial succulent herbaceous plant. No more than 10 centimeters in height.
