= Glyphipterix madagascariensis =

Scientific classification
- Kingdom: Animalia
- Phylum: Arthropoda
- Clade: Pancrustacea
- Class: Insecta
- Order: Lepidoptera
- Family: Glyphipterigidae
- Genus: Glyphipterix
- Species: G. madagascariensis

Binomial name
- Glyphipterix madagascariensis Viette, 1951

Species of moth

Glyphipterix madagascariensis is a moth in the family Glyphipterigidae. It is known from Madagascar.

The larvae feed on Kalanchoe species.
