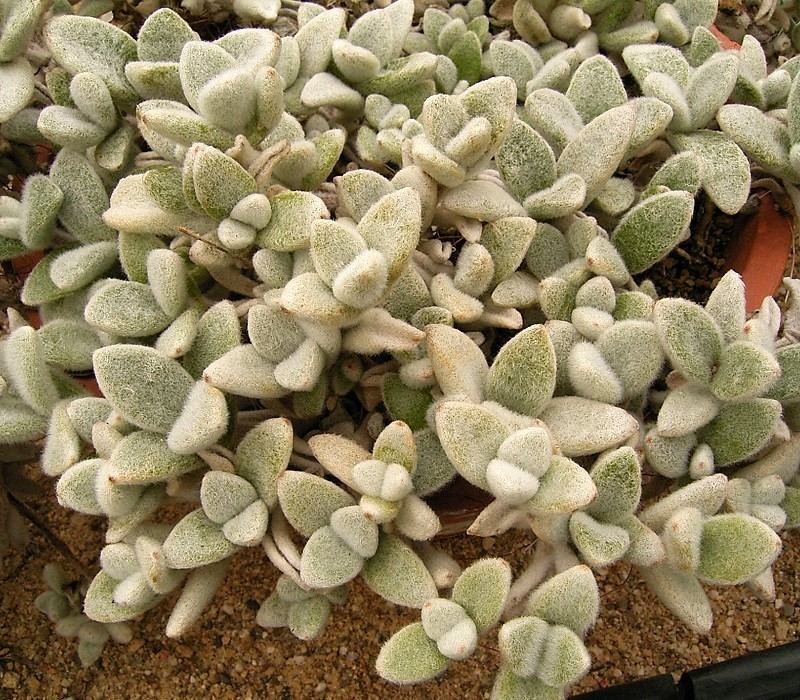

Scientific classification
- Kingdom: Plantae
- Clade: Tracheophytes
- Clade: Angiosperms
- Clade: Eudicots
- Order: Saxifragales
- Family: Crassulaceae
- Genus: Kalanchoe
- Species: K. eriophylla

Binomial name
- Kalanchoe eriophylla Hils. & Bojer ex Tul.

Synonyms
- Cotyledon pannosa Baker

= Kalanchoe eriophylla =

Species of flowering plant

Kalanchoe eriophylla is a species of flowering plant in the family Crassulaceae.

== Taxonomy ==
The species was described by Edmond Tulasne in 1857, following an earlier invalid description by Carl Hilsenberg and Wenceslas Bojer.

== Distribution ==
Kalanchoe eriophylla is native to the seasonally dry tropical biome of Madagascar.
