= K. floribunda =

K. floribunda may refer to:

- Kalanchoe floribunda, a succulent plant
- Kickxia floribunda, a cancerwort native to Europe
- Kraussia floribunda, an African plant
