= Kalanchoe salazarii =

Scientific classification
- Kingdom: Plantae
- Clade: Tracheophytes
- Clade: Angiosperms
- Clade: Eudicots
- Order: Saxifragales
- Family: Crassulaceae
- Genus: Kalanchoe
- Species: K. salazarii

Binomial name
- Kalanchoe salazarii Raym.-Hamet

Species of succulent

Kalanchoe salazarii is a succulent plant that is native to Huíla Province in Angola. It is named after the Portuguese dictator António de Oliveira Salazar.
