= Kalanchoe dineshii =

Scientific classification
- Kingdom: Plantae
- Clade: Tracheophytes
- Clade: Angiosperms
- Clade: Eudicots
- Order: Saxifragales
- Family: Crassulaceae
- Genus: Kalanchoe
- Species: K. dineshii

Binomial name
- Kalanchoe dineshii Syam Radh & Nampy

Species of flowering plant

Kalanchoe dineshii is a species of flowering plant in the family Crassulaceae. It is a perennial herb with corymbose inflorescences. The species is native to Kerala, India, and was described in 2022.

== Taxonomy ==
The species was described by S. Syam Radh and Santhosh Nampy in 2022. Kalanchoe dineshii is likely to be closely related to Kalanchoe bhidei and Kalanchoe olivacea.

== Distribution ==
Kalanchoe dineshii is native to the seasonally dry tropical biome of Kerala, India. It is found in Mathikettan Shola National Park, in the southern Western Ghats. The species is found in association with Cyanotis arachnoidea and Tripogon bromoides.

== Description ==
Kalanchoe dineshii is a reddish-white, decumbent or erect, perennial herb that grows 30–40 centimetres (12–16 in) high. The stems are woody at the base, and have prominent leaf scars. The leaves are obovate to obtrullate, 3–4.5 centimetres (1.2–1.8 in) long, 2–2.5 centimetres (0.79–0.98 in) wide, and lack stems.

The inflorescence is a corymb that grows on a 6–8 centimetres (2.4–3.1 in) long stem. The flower stems are 3–5 millimetres (0.12–0.20 in) long. The flowers are hermaphroditic, closely packed, 9–13 millimetres (0.35–0.51 in) long, and 4–6 millimetres (0.16–0.24 in) wide. The calyx has four pale green lobes, which are widely ovate, 2–3 millimetres (0.079–0.118 in) long, and 1.5–2 millimetres (0.059–0.079 in) wide. The corolla is a tube with four pinkish-white lobes, which are 3–5 millimetres (0.12–0.20 in) long, and 2–3 millimetres (0.079–0.118 in) wide. The flowers have eight stamens and four carpels.

Flowering and fruiting specimens have been collected between November and January. Unlike some other Kalanchoe species, Kalanchoe dineshii does not undergo asexual reproduction.

== Etymology ==
Kalanchoe dineshii is named after Dr. Dinesh Raj, an assistant professor at Bishop Moore College, who introduced the first describing author to angiosperm taxonomy.
