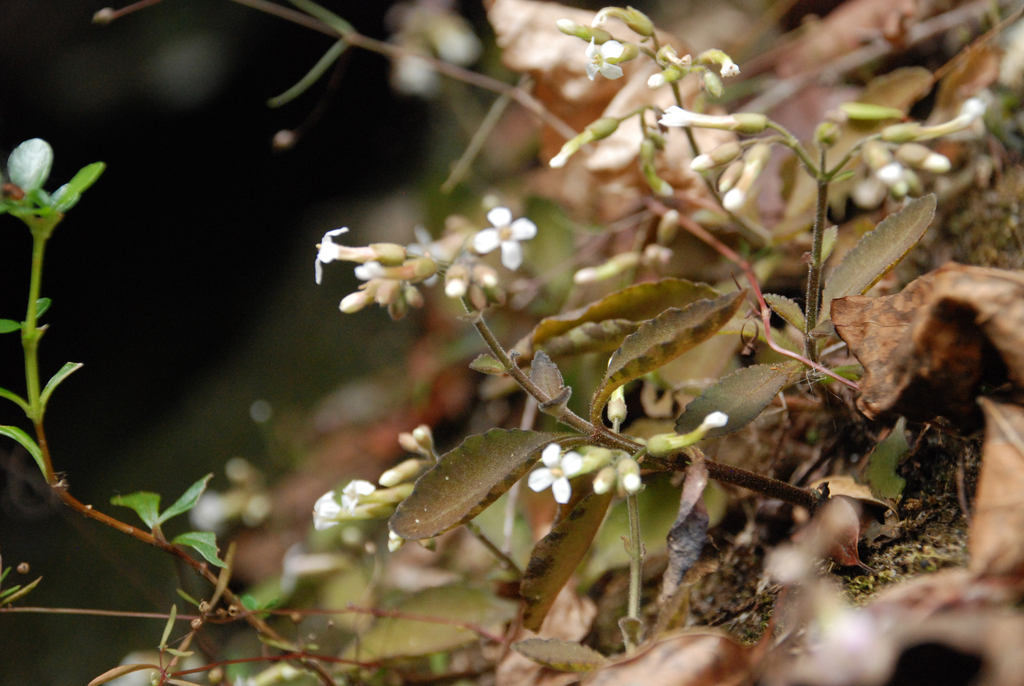

Scientific classification
- Kingdom: Plantae
- Clade: Tracheophytes
- Clade: Angiosperms
- Clade: Eudicots
- Order: Saxifragales
- Family: Crassulaceae
- Genus: Kalanchoe
- Species: K. bouvetii

Binomial name
- Kalanchoe bouvetii Raym.Hamet & H.Perrier

= Kalanchoe bouvetii =

Species of succulent

Kalanchoe bouvetii is a plant endemic to Madagascar. It was discovered by Raymond Hamet.
