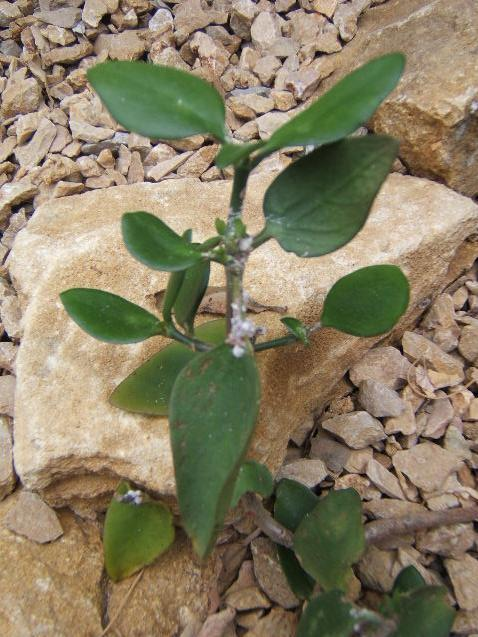

Scientific classification
- Kingdom: Plantae
- Clade: Tracheophytes
- Clade: Angiosperms
- Clade: Eudicots
- Order: Saxifragales
- Family: Crassulaceae
- Genus: Kalanchoe
- Species: K. arborescens

Binomial name
- Kalanchoe arborescens Humbert

= Kalanchoe arborescens =

Species of succulent

Kalanchoe arborescens is a species of Kalanchoe, native to Madagascar.
