= Kalanchoe dinklagei =

Scientific classification
- Kingdom: Plantae
- Clade: Tracheophytes
- Clade: Angiosperms
- Clade: Eudicots
- Order: Saxifragales
- Family: Crassulaceae
- Genus: Kalanchoe
- Species: K. dinklagei

Binomial name
- Kalanchoe dinklagei Rauh

Synonyms
- Kalanchoe brevisepala (Humbert) L.Allorge; Kalanchoe millotii var. brevisepala Humbert

Species of flowering plant

Kalanchoe dinklagei is a species of flowering plant in the family Crassulaceae. It is a shrub native to Madagascar, and was described in 1985.

== Taxonomy ==
Kalanchoe dinklagei was described by Werner Rauh in 1985.

== Distribution ==
Kalanchoe dinklagei is native to the deserts and dry shrublands of south-east Madagascar.

== Description ==
Kalanchoe dinklagei is a succulent shrub.
