= Kalanchoe fadeniorum =

Conservation status
- Extinct in the Wild (IUCN 3.1)

Scientific classification
- Kingdom: Plantae
- Clade: Tracheophytes
- Clade: Angiosperms
- Clade: Eudicots
- Order: Saxifragales
- Family: Crassulaceae
- Genus: Kalanchoe
- Species: K. fadeniorum

Binomial name
- Kalanchoe fadeniorum Raadts

Species of succulent

Kalanchoe fadeniorum is a species of Kalanchoe in the family Crassulaceae.

== Description ==
=== Vegetative characters ===
Kalanchoe fadeniorum is an herbaceous perennial plant lacking hairs that reaches about 10 cm in height. The branched stems have a creeping growth habit. Erect stems are densely leafy. The fleshy leaves are almost sessile to shortly petiolate. The half amplexicaul petiole is up to 5 millimeters long. The green, almost circular, broadly ovate or inversely ovate laminae are 1.5 to 5 centimeters long and 1.3 to 4 centimeters wide. Their apices are blunt and their bases narrowed. The leaf margin is entire or serrate-crenate.

=== Reproductive characters ===
The inflorescence is a compound cyme and attains a length of 6 to 7 centimeters with a similar width. The erect flowers sit atop 3 to 4 millimeters long pedicels. The corolla tube is approximately 0.5 millimeters long. The triangular sepals are 2 to 2.5 millimeters long and approximately 1 millimeter wide. The petals are pale reddish yellow-brown below and reddish above. The cylindrical, nearly square corolla tube is somewhat expanded in the lower half and 13 to 14 millimeters long. The elliptical petals are 9 to 10 millimeters long and 3.5 to 4 millimeters wide. The stamens are attached in the upper half of the corolla tube and are not exserted. The elongate anthers are approximately 0.7 millimeters long. The linear nectaries reach a length of 2 to 2.5 millimeters. The stalked, cylindric-lanceolate carpel is 10 to 11.5 millimeters. The stigma is approximately 2 millimeters long.

The elongate, ovate seeds reach a length of about 0.6 millimeters.

== Systematics and distribution ==
Kalanchoe fadeniorum is found in southwestern Kenya in half evergreen brush on sandy soil at 360 metres of elevation.

The first description of the plant was published by Edith Marie Raadts in 1979.
