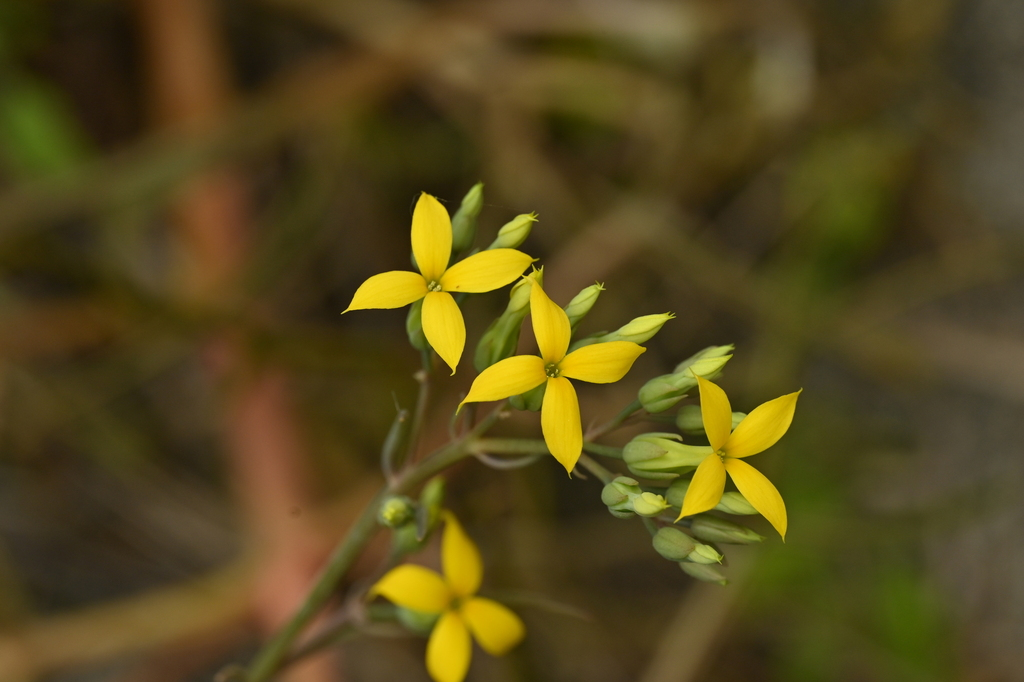

Scientific classification
- Kingdom: Plantae
- Clade: Tracheophytes
- Clade: Angiosperms
- Clade: Eudicots
- Order: Saxifragales
- Family: Crassulaceae
- Genus: Kalanchoe
- Species: K. ceratophylla

Binomial name
- Kalanchoe ceratophylla Haw.

Varieties
- Kalanchoe ceratophylla var. ceratophylla; Kalanchoe ceratophylla var. indochinensis H.Ohba

Synonyms
- Vereia ceratophylla (Haw.) D.Dietr.

= Kalanchoe ceratophylla =

Species of flowering plant

Kalanchoe ceratophylla is a species of flowering plant in the family Crassulaceae. It is a subshrub or herb with yellow flowers. The species is native to Asia. It is used both ornamentally, and in medicine.

Kalanchoe ceratophylla was described in 1821.

== Taxonomy ==
The species was described by Adrian Hardy Haworth in 1821.

Two varieties are recognised:

- Kalanchoe ceratophylla var. ceratophylla
- Kalanchoe ceratophylla var. indochinensis H.Ohba

== Distribution ==
Kalanchoe ceratophylla is native to the subtropical biome of India (Assam), Bangladesh, Cambodia, south-central and south-east China (Fujian, Guangdong, Guangxi, and Yunnan), Laos, Myanmar, the Philippines, Taiwan, Thailand, and Vietnam.

== Description ==
Kalanchoe ceratophylla is a perennial subshrub or herb that grows 20–100 centimetres (0.66–3.28 ft) tall.

The leaves are 8–15 centimetres (3.1–5.9 in) long, and grow on 2.5–4 centimetres (0.98–1.57 in) long stems. The plant also has leaflets with serrated margins.

The inflorescence is 10–30 centimetres (3.9–11.8 in) long. The sepals are lanceolate, and 4–10 millimetres (0.16–0.39 in) long. The corolla is yellow, with a tube around 1.5 centimetres (0.59 in) long, and 5–6 millimetres (0.20–0.24 in) lobes. The plant flowers in March.

== Uses ==
Kalanchoe ceratophylla is cultivated ornamentally. The whole plant is used in medicine.

== Nomenclature ==
In Chinese, the species is known as 小燈籠草 (xiao deng long cao) or 伽蓝菜 (jia lan cai).
