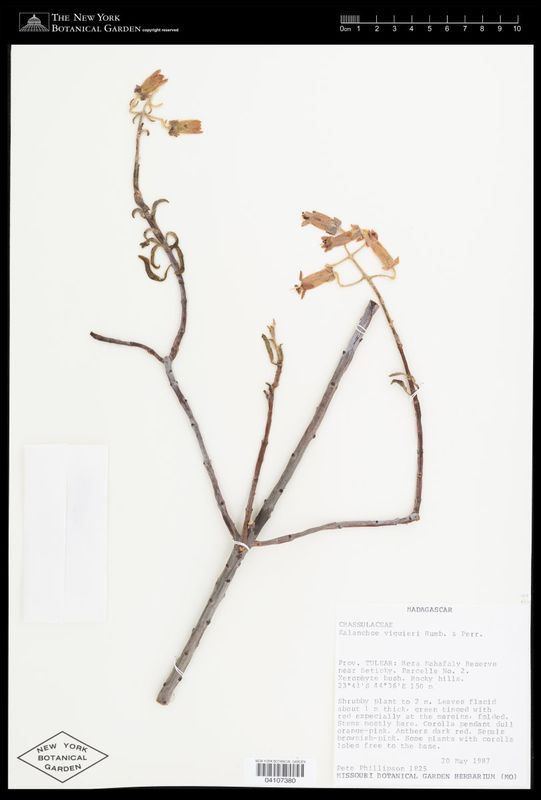

Scientific classification
- Kingdom: Plantae
- Clade: Embryophytes
- Clade: Tracheophytes
- Clade: Angiosperms
- Clade: Eudicots
- Order: Saxifragales
- Family: Crassulaceae
- Genus: Kalanchoe
- Species: K. viguieri

Binomial name
- Kalanchoe viguieri Raym.-Hamet & H.Perrier

Synonyms
- Kalanchoe viguieri var. latisepala Raym.-Hamet & H.Perrier

= Kalanchoe viguieri =

Species of flowering plant

Kalanchoe viguieri is a species of flowering plant in the family Crassulaceae. It is a herb or shrub native to Madagascar, that was described in 1914.

== Taxonomy ==
The species was described by Raymond-Hamet and Joseph Marie Henry Alfred Perrier de la Bâthie in 1914.

== Distribution ==
Kalanchoe viguieri is endemic to the seasonally dry tropical biome of Madagascar.

== Description ==
Kalanchoe viguieri is a herb or shrub.
