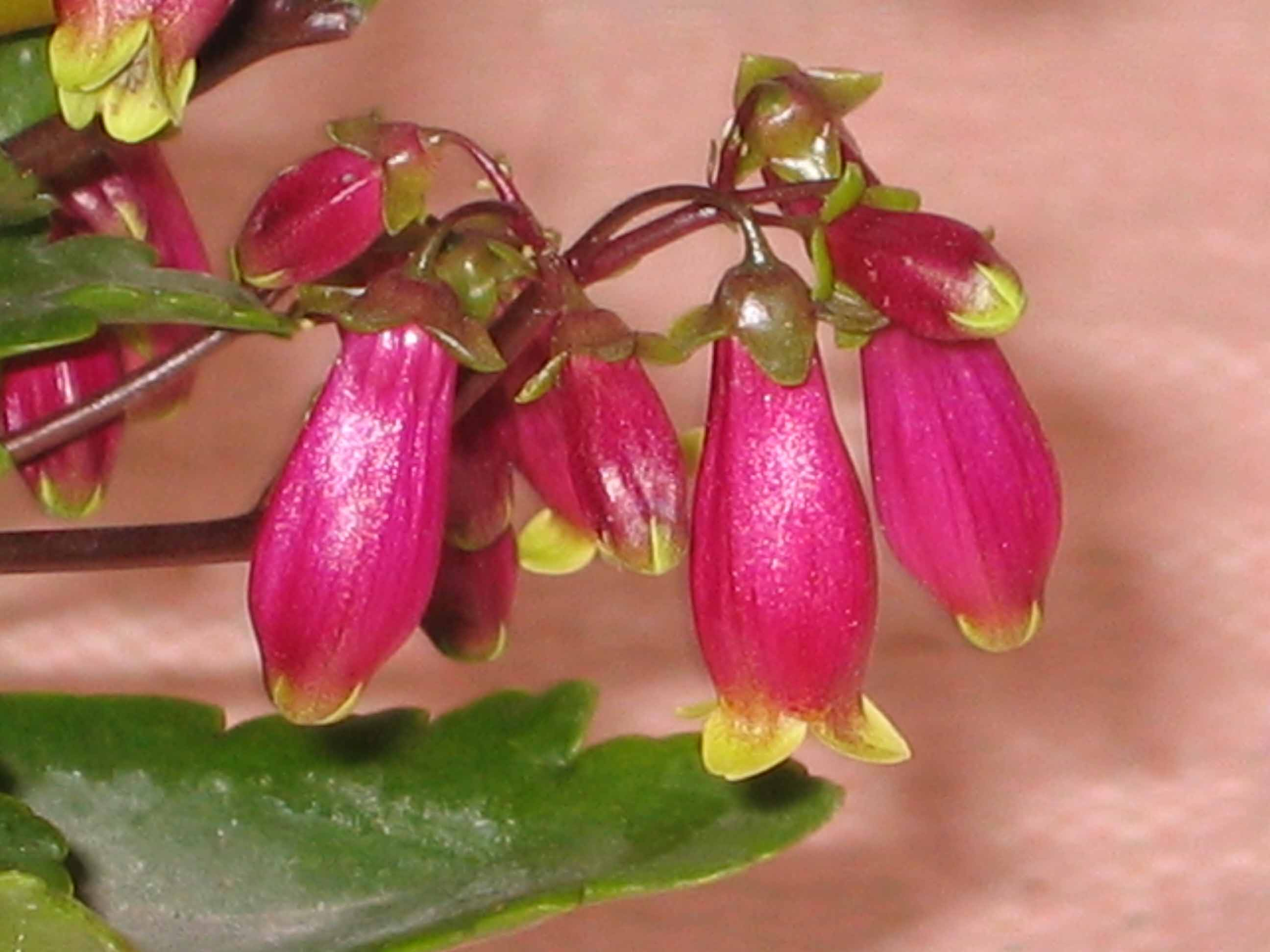

Scientific classification
- Kingdom: Plantae
- Clade: Tracheophytes
- Clade: Angiosperms
- Clade: Eudicots
- Order: Saxifragales
- Family: Crassulaceae
- Genus: Kalanchoe
- Species: K. porphyrocalyx

Binomial name
- Kalanchoe porphyrocalyx (Baker) Baill.

= Kalanchoe porphyrocalyx =

Species of succulent

Kalanchoe porphyrocalyx is a species of Kalanchoe native to Madagascar.

Many cultivars have been derived from K. porphyrocalyx. 'Wendy' is a multiflorous cultivar with 15–30 flowers in an inflorescence, which may derive solely from K. porphyrocalyx or originate from hybridization between K. miniata and K. porphyrocalyx.

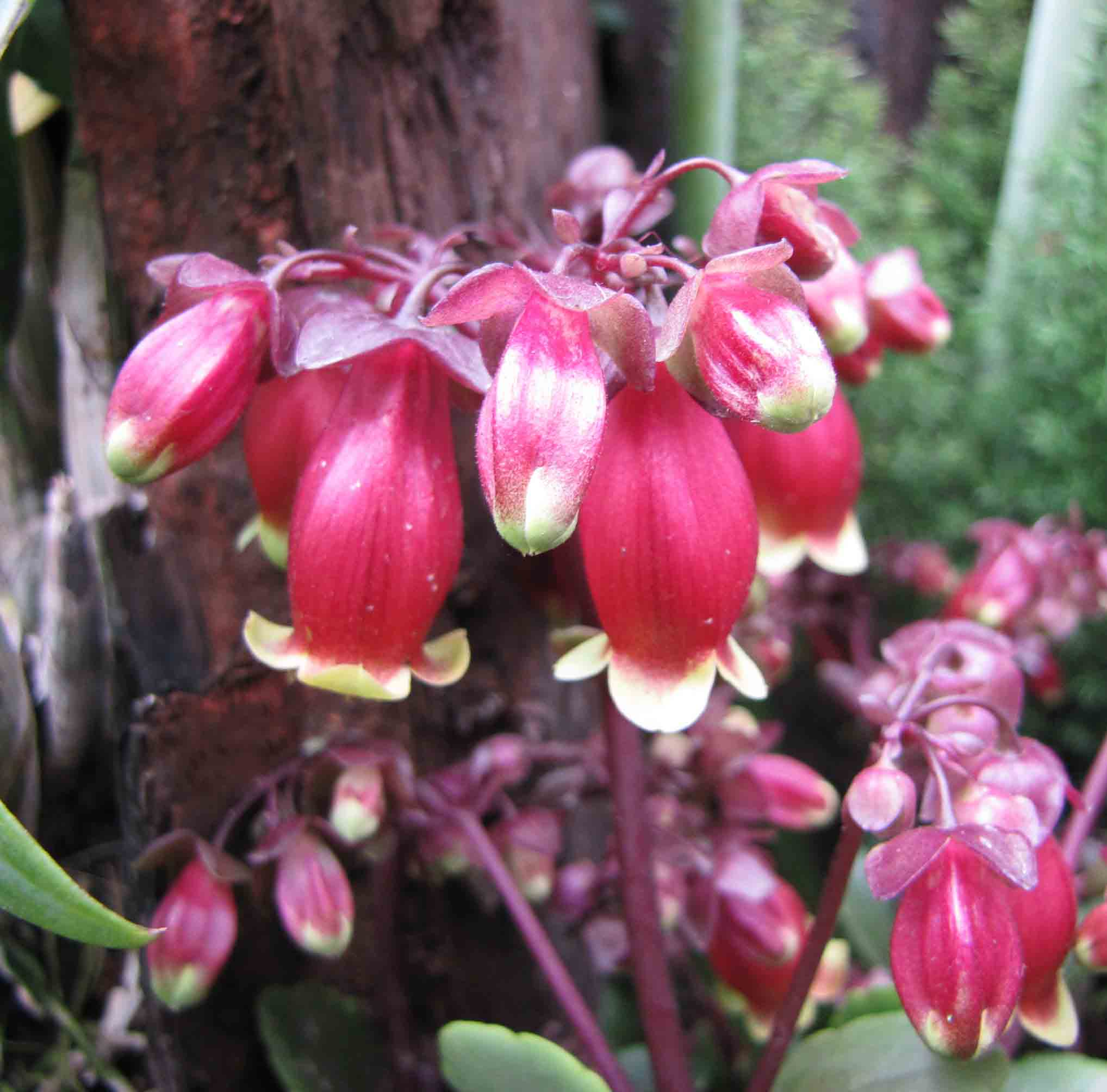

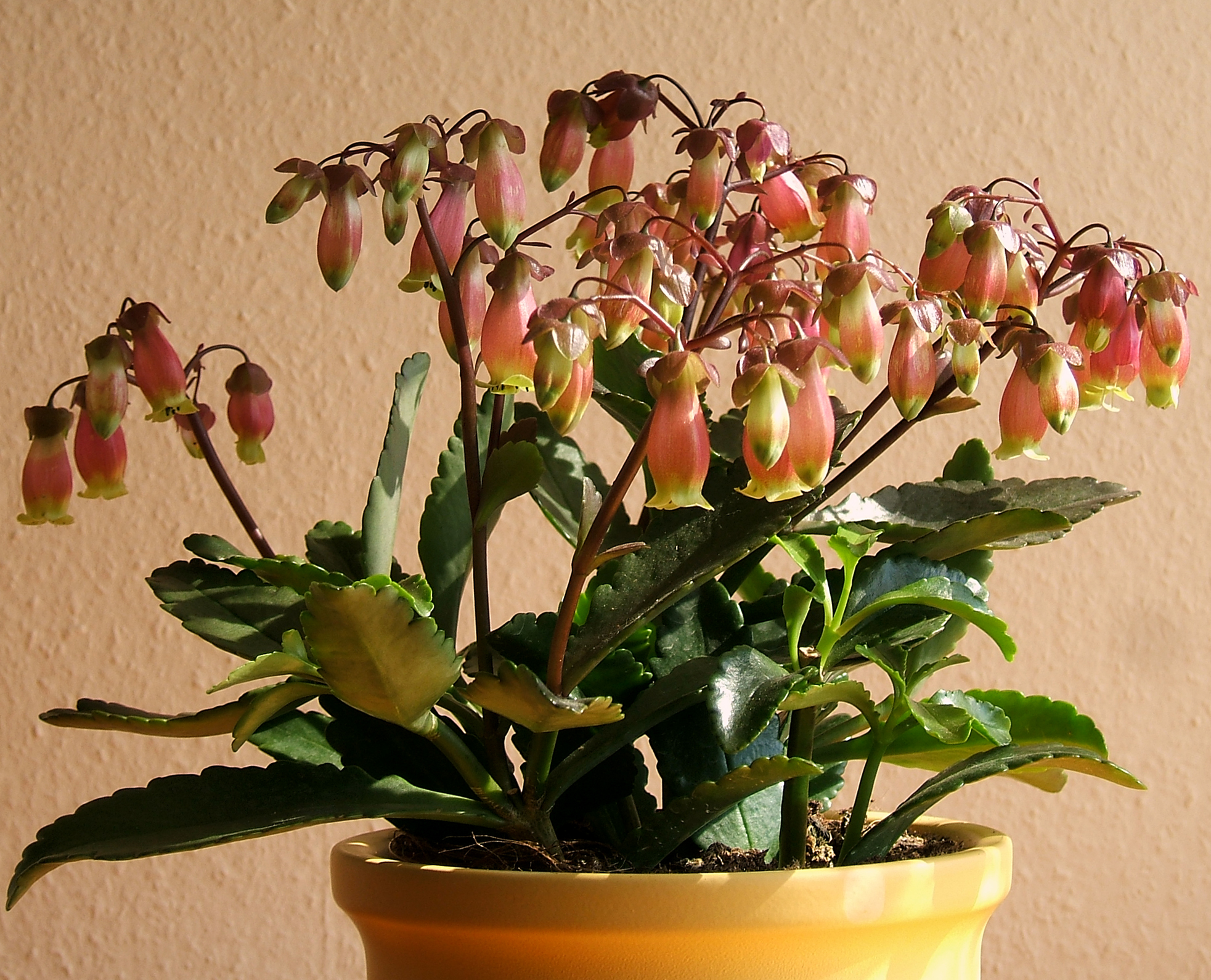
