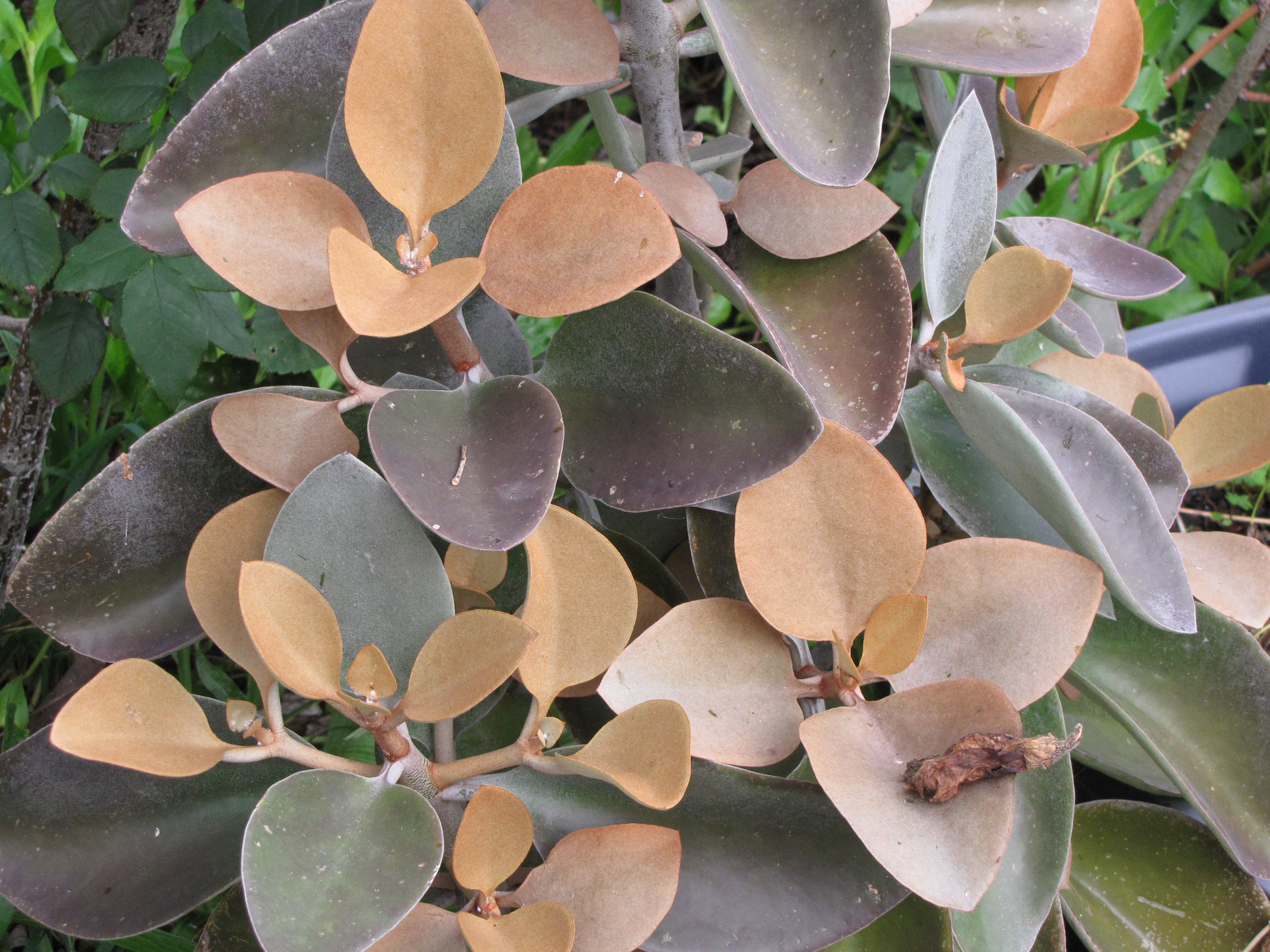

Scientific classification
- Kingdom: Plantae
- Clade: Embryophytes
- Clade: Tracheophytes
- Clade: Angiosperms
- Clade: Eudicots
- Order: Saxifragales
- Family: Crassulaceae
- Genus: Kalanchoe
- Species: K. orgyalis

Binomial name
- Kalanchoe orgyalis Baker

Synonyms
- Kalanchoe antanosiana Drake

= Kalanchoe orgyalis =

Species of plant

Kalanchoe orgyalis is a species of flowering plant in the Crassulaceae family. It is a succulent commonly known as copper spoons because of its leaf shape and color.

== Description ==
The perennial Kalanchoe orgyalis is a heavily branched shrub that reaches heights of 1 to 2 meters, which is covered with characteristic, star-shaped hairs. Its upright shoots are branched and strong. Young shoots have long hairs. The tough, densely long-haired, petiole is gray-green to reddish-brown on the upper side and green to silver on the underside.

The 5 to 15 millimeter long leaf stalk is grooved. The egg-shaped, egg-shaped-spatulate, elliptical to lanceolate leaf blade is often folded like a gutter, 5 to 15 centimeters long and 3.5 to 10 centimeters wide. It is pointed at the tip and narrowed at the base. The leaf edge is entire.

=== Inflorescence ===
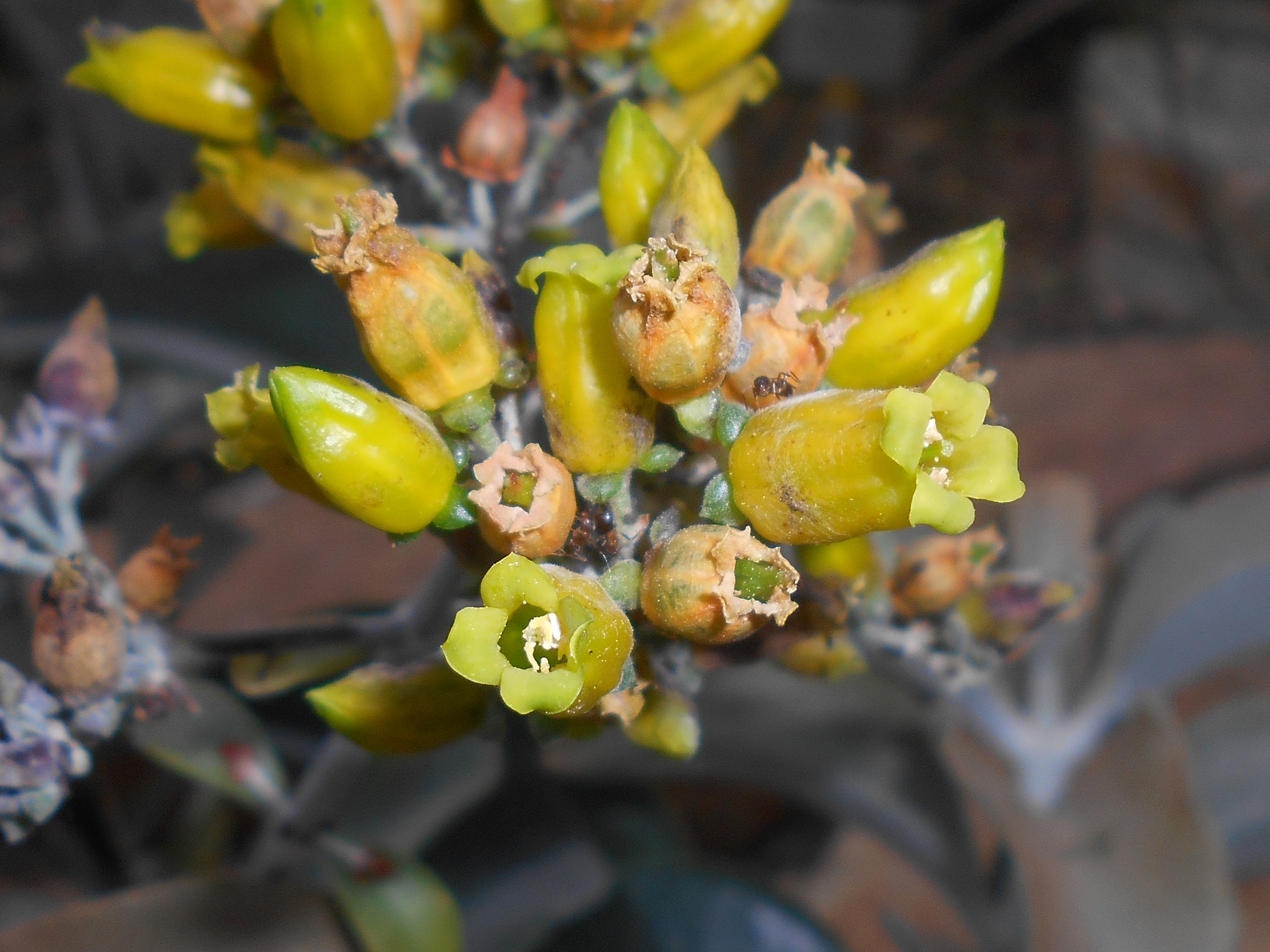
Flowers

The inflorescence is a more or less dense, even-branched thyrsus 45 to 100 centimeters long. The upright to spreading flowers sit on 5 to 15 millimeter long flower stalks. The fleshy calyx tube is almost missing and ends in egg-shaped to circular, pointed to slightly thorny tips that are 3 to 5 millimeters long and 1.4 to 2.8 millimeters wide. The urn-shaped to square corolla is very fleshy, yellow, glabrous or long-haired. The 6 to 15 millimeter long corolla tube has spread out, egg-shaped-triangular, pointed-thorny tips that are 2.5 to 5 millimeters long and 3 to 6.5 millimeters wide.

The stamens are attached above the middle of the corolla tube and do not protrude from the corolla tube. The anthers are egg-shaped and 1.5 to 2 millimeters long. The trapezoidal to semicircular nectar scales are about 1.5 millimeters in size. The carpel is between 6.5 and 10 millimeters long, the style between 2 and 2.5 millimeters long.

== Distribution ==
The plant is endemic to southern and southwestern Madagascar, where it grows between bushes on rocky outcrops and dry soils.
