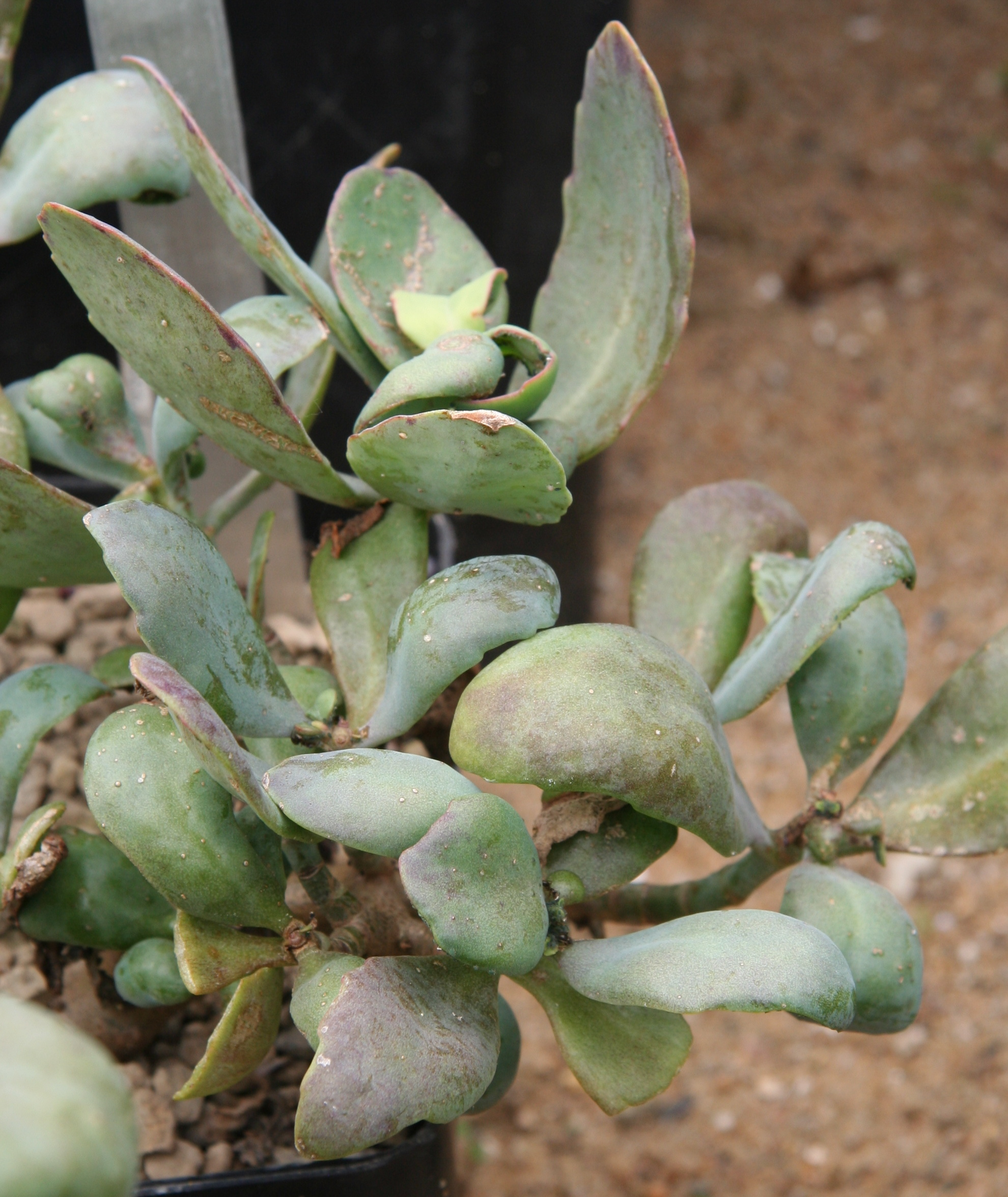

Scientific classification
- Kingdom: Plantae
- Clade: Tracheophytes
- Clade: Angiosperms
- Clade: Eudicots
- Order: Saxifragales
- Family: Crassulaceae
- Genus: Kalanchoe
- Species: K. bentii

Binomial name
- Kalanchoe bentii C.H.Wright ex Hook.f.

= Kalanchoe bentii =

Species of succulent

Kalanchoe bentii is a subshrub that grows in Somalia and Yemen. It can grow to at least 1 metre (3 ft 3 in) tall.
