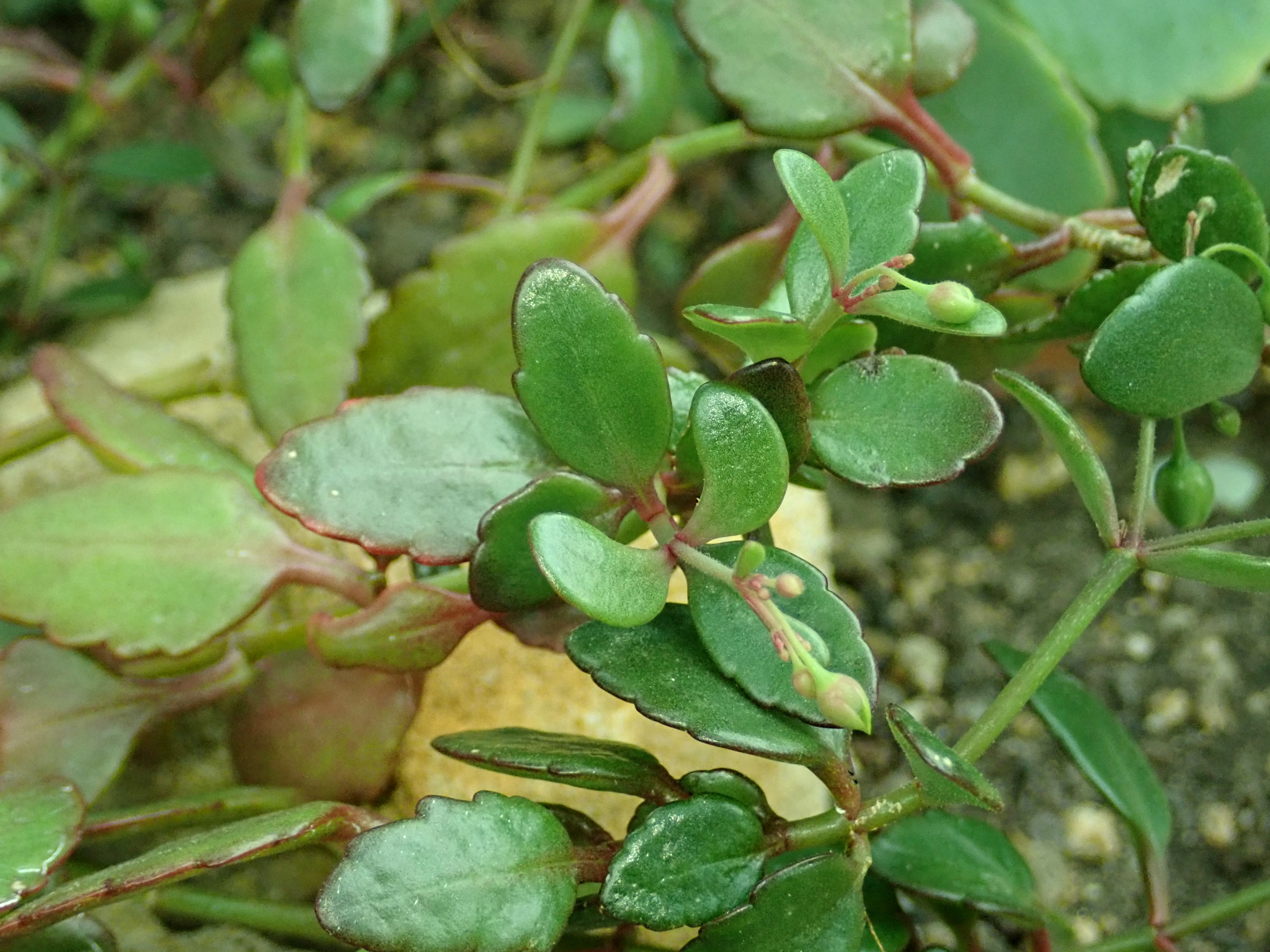

Scientific classification
- Kingdom: Plantae
- Clade: Embryophytes
- Clade: Tracheophytes
- Clade: Spermatophytes
- Clade: Angiosperms
- Clade: Eudicots
- Order: Saxifragales
- Family: Crassulaceae
- Genus: Kalanchoe
- Species: K. gracilipes

Binomial name
- Kalanchoe gracilipes Baill.

Varieties
- Kalanchoe gracilipes var. gracilipes; Kalanchoe gracilipes var. microphylla Humbert ex L.Allorge

Synonyms
- Bryophyllum gracilipes (Baker) Eggli; Kitchingia gracilipes Baker

= Kalanchoe gracilipes =

Species of flowering plant

Kalanchoe gracilipes is a species of flowering plant in the family Crassulaceae. It is an epiphyte endemic to Madagascar. The species was first described in 1881.

== Taxonomy ==
In 1881, John Gilbert Baker described Kitchingia gracilipes, a synonym of Kalanchoe gracilipes. In 1885, Henri Ernest Baillon moved the species to Kalanchoe.

Two varieties are recognised:

- Kalanchoe gracilipes var. gracilipes - central and south-east Madagascar
- Kalanchoe gracilipes var. microphylla - south-east Madagascar

== Distribution ==
The species is native to the seasonally dry tropical biome of central and south-eastern Madagascar. It is endemic to Madagascar.

== Description ==
Kalanchoe gracilipes is an epiphytic herb or shrub.
