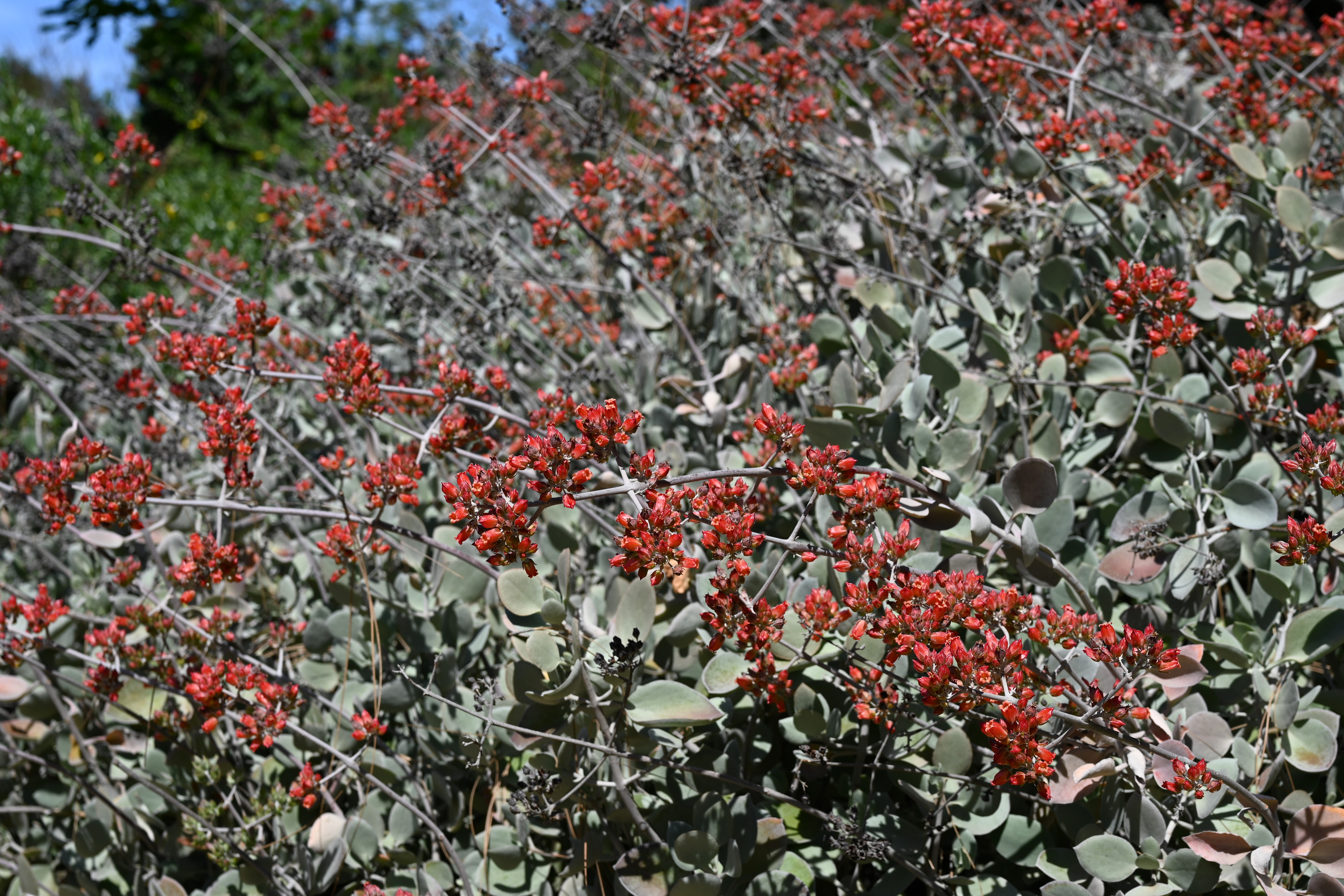

Scientific classification
- Kingdom: Plantae
- Clade: Embryophytes
- Clade: Tracheophytes
- Clade: Angiosperms
- Clade: Eudicots
- Order: Saxifragales
- Family: Crassulaceae
- Genus: Kalanchoe
- Species: K. bracteata

Binomial name
- Kalanchoe bracteata Scott Elliot

Synonyms
- Kalanchoe bracteata var. aurantiaca Rauh & Hebding; Kalanchoe bracteata var. glabra Rauh & Hebding; Kalanchoe bracteata subsp. glabra Rauh & Hebding; Kalanchoe bracteata var. longisepala Boiteau ex L.Allorge; Kalanchoe bracteata var. pubescens Rauh & Hebding; Kalanchoe bracteata var. virescens Desc.; Kalanchoe nadyae Raym.-Hamet

= Kalanchoe bracteata =

Species of flowering plant

Kalanchoe bracteata, commonly known as silver teaspoons or silver spoons, is a species of flowering plant in the family Crassulaceae. It is around 1.5 feet (46 cm) high, and has inflorescences with three or more flowers. The species is native to Madagascar, and was described in 1891.

== Taxonomy ==
The species was described by George Francis Scott Elliot in 1891.

== Distribution ==
Kalanchoe bracteata is endemic to the seasonally dry tropical biome of Madagascar.

== Description ==
Kalanchoe bracteata grows to around 1.5 feet (46 cm) high. When young, the branches have four sides. The leaves are 2–3 centimetres (0.79–1.18 in) long, around 1.5 centimetres (0.59 in) wide, and have 5–7 millimetres (0.20–0.28 in) stems.

The inflorescences have three or more flowers. The flower stems are up to 1 centimetre (0.39 in) long. The bracts are over 1 centimetre (0.39 in) long. The calyx is 4–5 millimetres (0.16–0.20 in) long, and divided nearly to the base. The corolla is around 1 centimetre (0.39 in) long, and around 5 millimetres (0.20 in) wide at the base.
