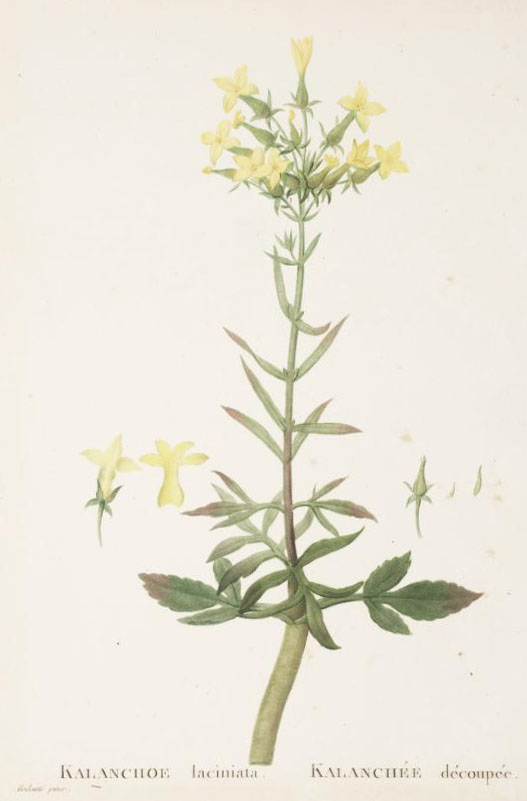

Scientific classification
- Kingdom: Plantae
- Clade: Tracheophytes
- Clade: Angiosperms
- Clade: Eudicots
- Order: Saxifragales
- Family: Crassulaceae
- Genus: Kalanchoe
- Species: K. laciniata

Binomial name
- Kalanchoe laciniata (L.) DC. 1802

Synonyms
- Cotyledon laciniata; Kalanchoe acutifola; Kalanchoe aegyptiaca; Kalanchoe carnea; Kalanchoe floribunda; Kalnchoe rosea; Vereia laciniata

= Kalanchoe laciniata =

Species of succulent

Kalanchoe laciniata, commonly known as the christmas tree plant or cathedral bells, is a small plant which is native to the Arabian Peninsula, Eritrea, and the Middle East but it also can be found in parts of India and Sri Lanka.

Kalanchoe laciniata is a succulent plant with reddish erect simple stems, with fleshy green leaves. It grows up to 1 m (3 ft 3 in) in height. The leaves are compound or dissected, up to 140 mm (5.5 in) long and 80 mm (3.1 in) wide. The flowers are greenish-white to light orange in colour and grow up to 15 mm (0.59 in) long.
