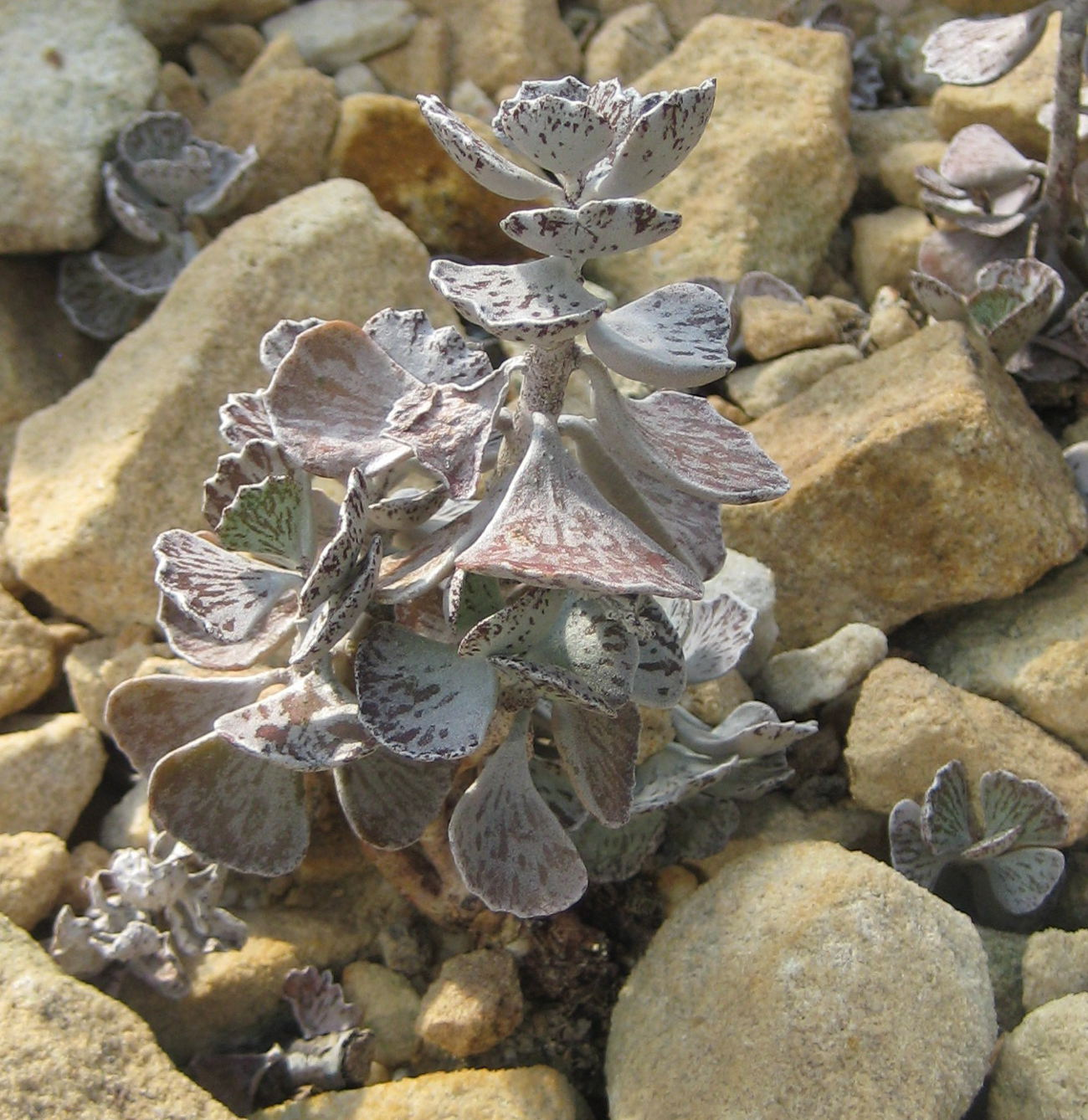

Scientific classification
- Kingdom: Plantae
- Clade: Tracheophytes
- Clade: Angiosperms
- Clade: Eudicots
- Order: Saxifragales
- Family: Crassulaceae
- Genus: Kalanchoe
- Species: K. rhombopilosa

Binomial name
- Kalanchoe rhombopilosa Mannoni & Boiteau

Synonyms
- Heterotypic Synonyms: Kalanchoe rhombopilosa var. argentea Rauh; Kalanchoe rhombopilosa var. viridifolia Rauh

= Kalanchoe rhombopilosa =

Species of succulent

Kalanchoe rhombopilosa is a species of succulent plant in the family Crassulaceae. It is endemic to southwest Itampolo, Madagascar. The species was described by Mannoni & Boiteau in 1947 and is indexed in Notul. Syst. (Paris) 13:153-154, (1947). The plant is a herbaceous perennial that grows to 10–20 cm in height.

== Other Reading ==
- Boiteau, P & Allorge-Boiteau, L., Kalanchoe de Madagascar, 1995. Karthala.
- Eggli, U. (Ed.) 2003c. The Illustrated Handbook of Succulent Plants; Crassulaceae. Berlin: Springer-Verlag.
- Jacobsen, H. 1970 (Trans. Lois Glass 1977). Lexicon of Succulent Plants. Poole, Dorset: Blandford Press.
- Rauh, W., Xerophytic and Succulent Plants of Madagascar, Vols. 1 & 2, 1995 and 1998. Strawberry Press.
- Raven, P. et al. The Biology of Plants, W.H. Freeman and company. New York, 2005. p. 135.
- Sajeva, M. & Costanzo, M., Succulents - The Illustrated Dictionary, Timber Press.
