= Kalanchoe 'Tarantula' =

Species of succulent

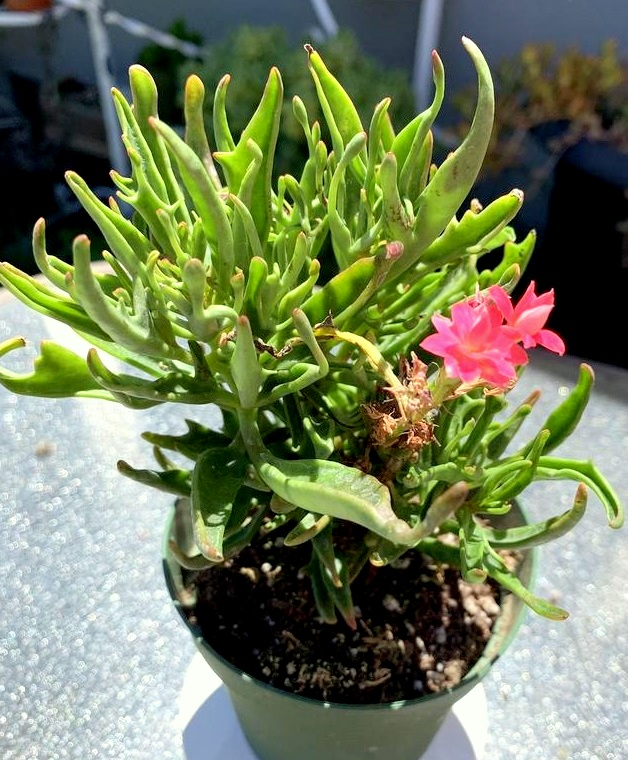
- Genus: Kalanchoe
- Cultivar: 'Tarantula'

Kalanchoe 'Tarantula', or Kalanchoe katapifa 'Tarantula', is a succulent cultivar in the Kalanchoe genus that produces small bouquets of pink flowers.

== Description ==
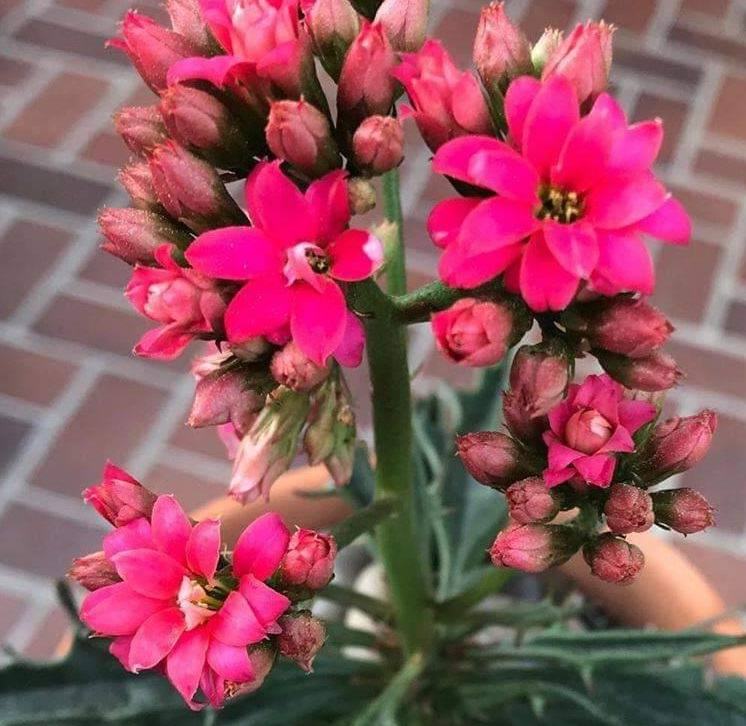
Cluster of flowers

30cm in height and width, the plant features irregular, spidery leaves (hence its name), and produces long-lasting, vibrant pink flowers in spring and autumn.

== Cultivation ==
It is cultivated as houseplant and as a rock or garden plant. In winter, it thrives in bright light indoors as it is frost-intolerant. In summer it would need bright indirect light with some shade.

== See also ==
- Kalanchoe blossfeldiana
