= Kalanchoe adelae =

Scientific classification
- Kingdom: Plantae
- Clade: Tracheophytes
- Clade: Angiosperms
- Clade: Eudicots
- Order: Saxifragales
- Family: Crassulaceae
- Genus: Kalanchoe
- Species: K. adelae

Binomial name
- Kalanchoe adelae Raym.-Hamet

Synonyms
- Bryophyllum adelae (Raym.-Hamet) A.Berger); Kalanchoe floribunda Tul.

Species of plant

Kalanchoe adelae is a succulent plant that grows in the Comoros. It was discovered by French botanist Raymond Hamet. It is named after Madame Adele Le Chartier, an acquaintance of Hamet.
