= Carl Hilsenberg =

German naturalist, botanist and ornithologist (1802–1824)

Carl (or Karl) Theodor Hilsenberg (11 March 1802 – 11 September 1824) was a German naturalist, botanist and ornithologist, who collected plants in Madagascar and Mauritius. The expedition in Mauritius resulted in the publication of an exsiccata-like series issued by Franz Sieber with the title Flora Mauritiana. He described the sooty albatross in 1822.
