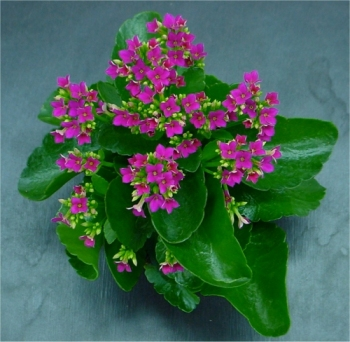
- Kalanchoe blossfeldiana

Scientific classification
- Kingdom: Plantae
- Clade: Tracheophytes
- Clade: Angiosperms
- Clade: Eudicots
- Order: Saxifragales
- Family: Crassulaceae
- Subfamily: Kalanchoideae
- Genus: Kalanchoe; Adans.

Subgenera
- Kalanchoe; Bryophyllum (Salisb.) Koorders; Kitchingia (Baker) Gideon F.Sm. & Figueiredo

Synonyms
- Bryophyllum

= Kalanchoe =

Genus of flowering plants in the stonecrop family

Kalanchoe (/ˌkæləŋˈkoʊ.iː/ KAL-əng-KOH-ee), (also called "kalanchöe" or "kalanchoë"), is a genus of about 125 species of tropical, succulent plants in the stonecrop family Crassulaceae, mainly native to Madagascar and tropical Africa. A Kalanchoe species was one of the first plants to be sent into space, sent on a resupply to the Soviet Salyut 6 space station in 1979.

== Description ==
Most are shrubs or perennial herbaceous plants, but a few are annual or biennial. The largest, Kalanchoe beharensis from Madagascar, can reach 6 m (20 ft) tall, but most species are less than 1 m (3 ft) tall.

Kalanchoes open their flowers by growing new cells on the inner surface of the petals to force them outwards, and on the outside of the petals to close them. Kalanchoe flowers are divided into 4 sections with 8 stamens. The petals are fused into a tube, in a similar way to some related genera such as Cotyledon.

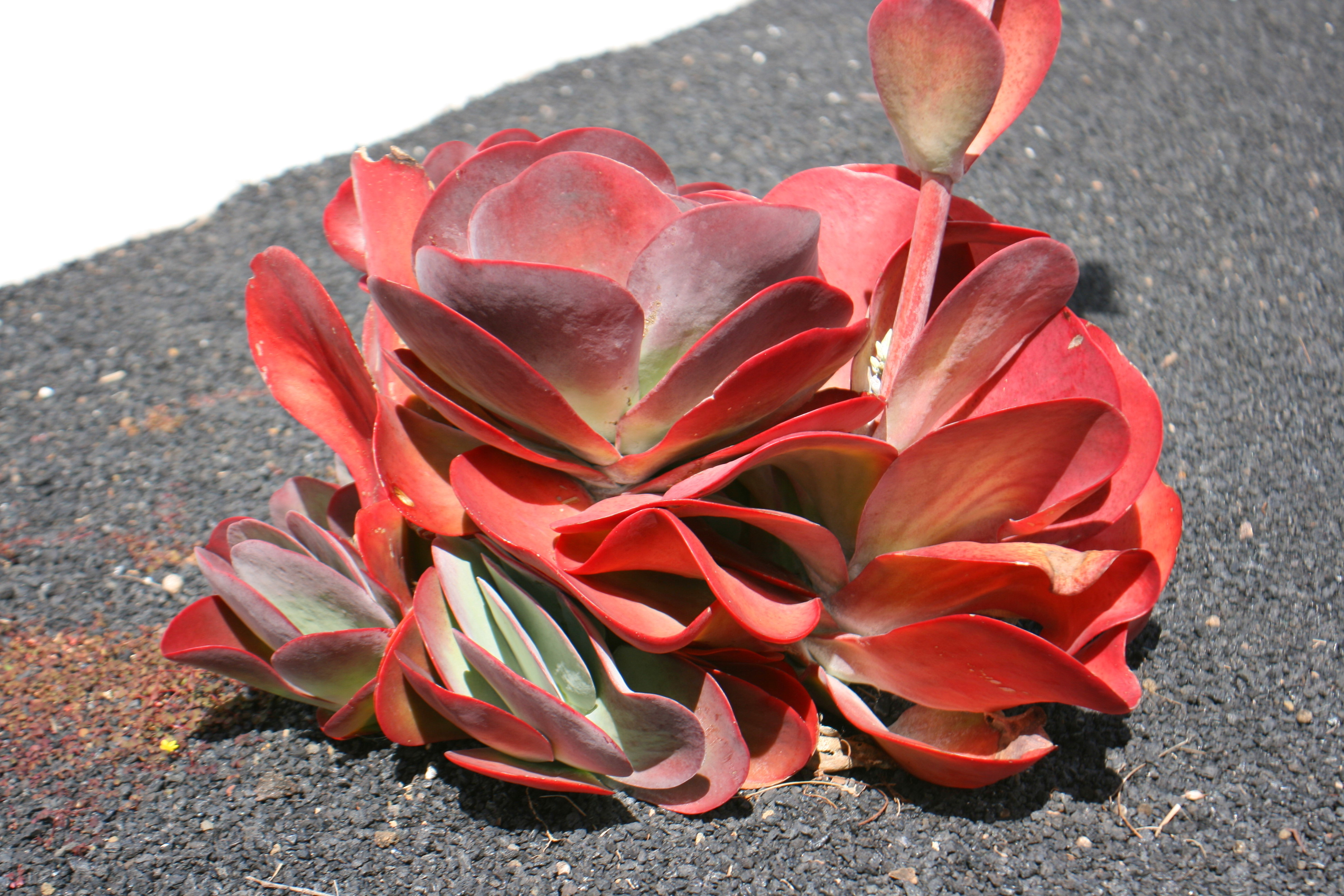
Kalanchoe luciae

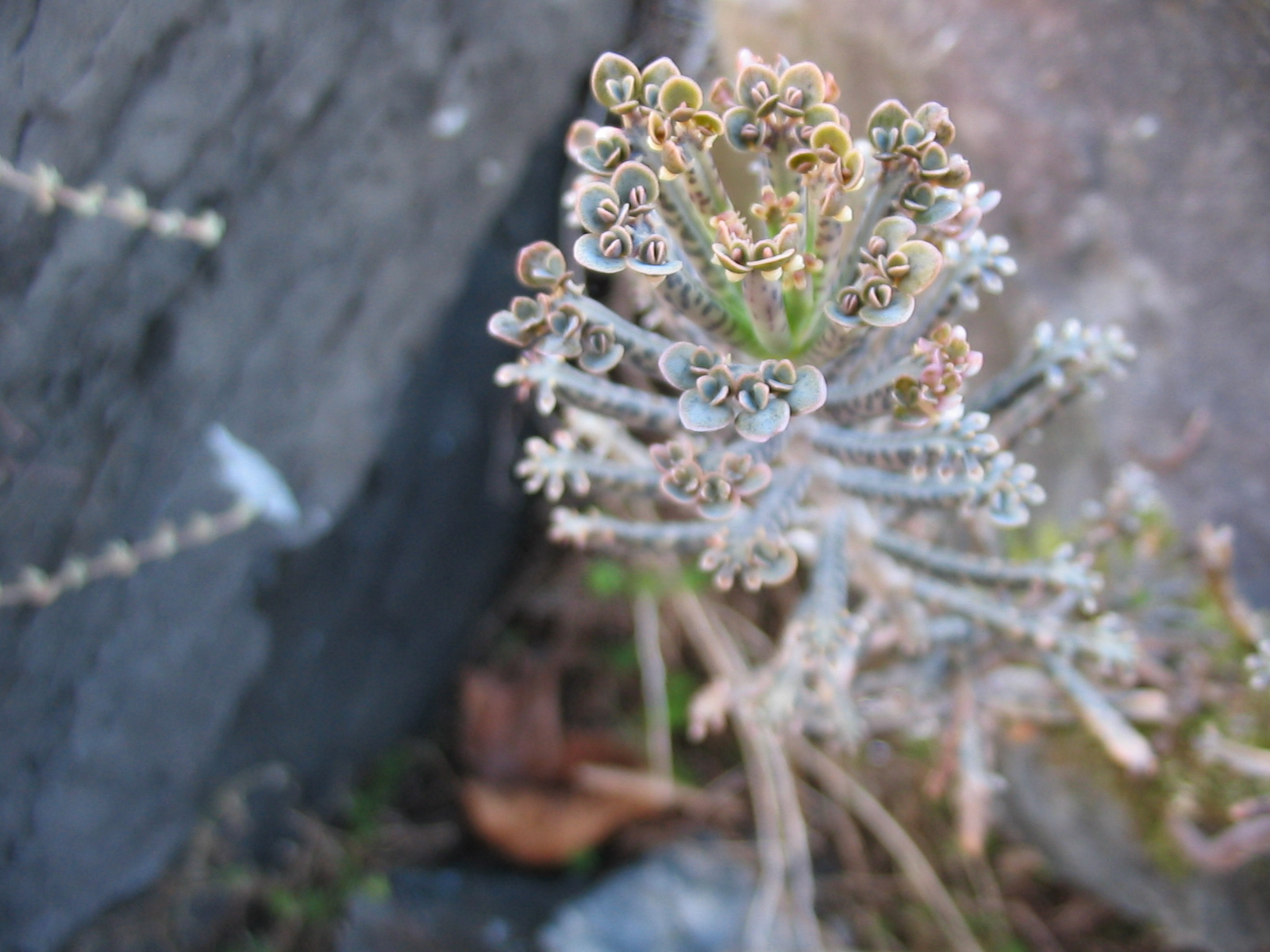
Kalanchoe delagoensis

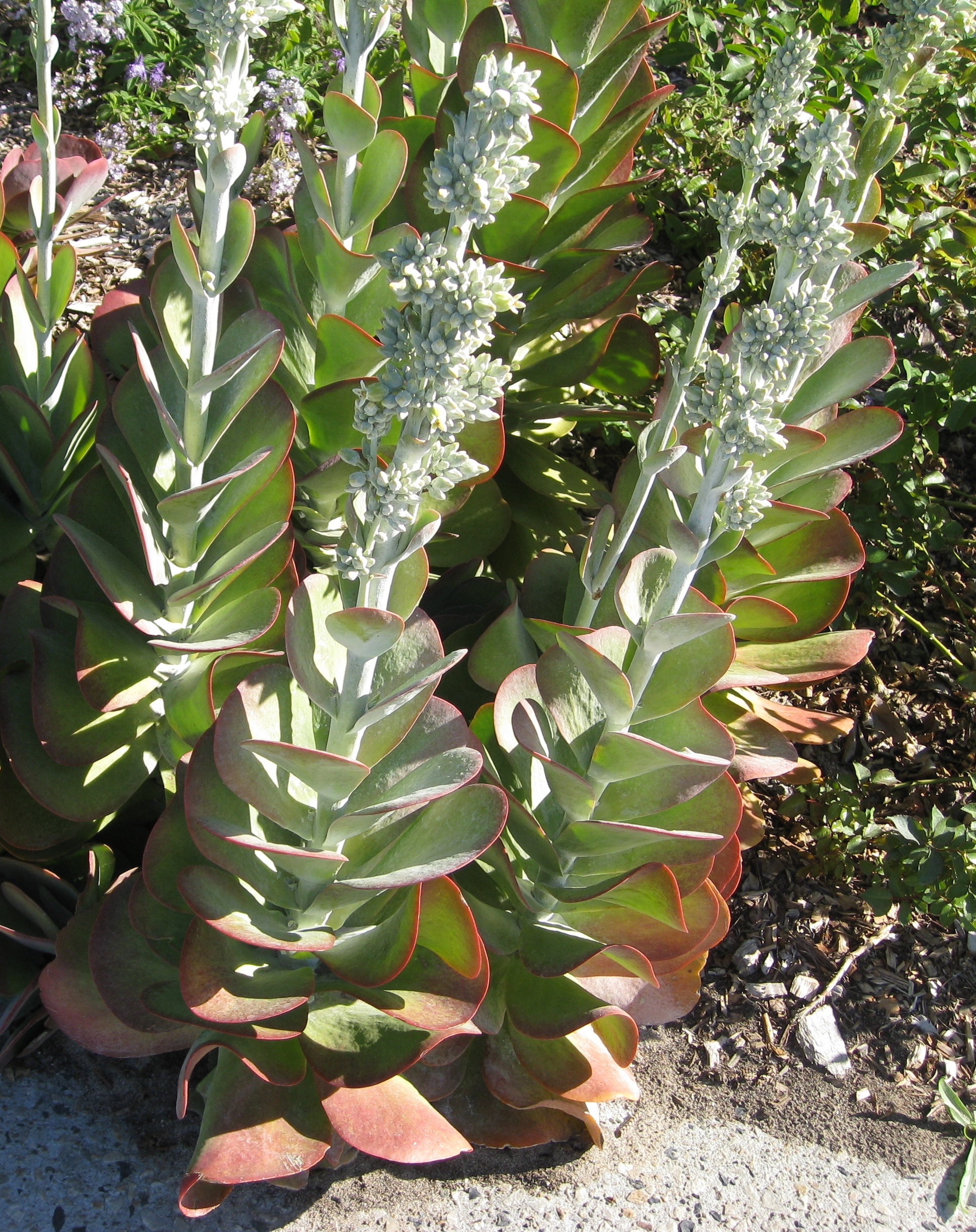
Kalanchoe thyrsiflora

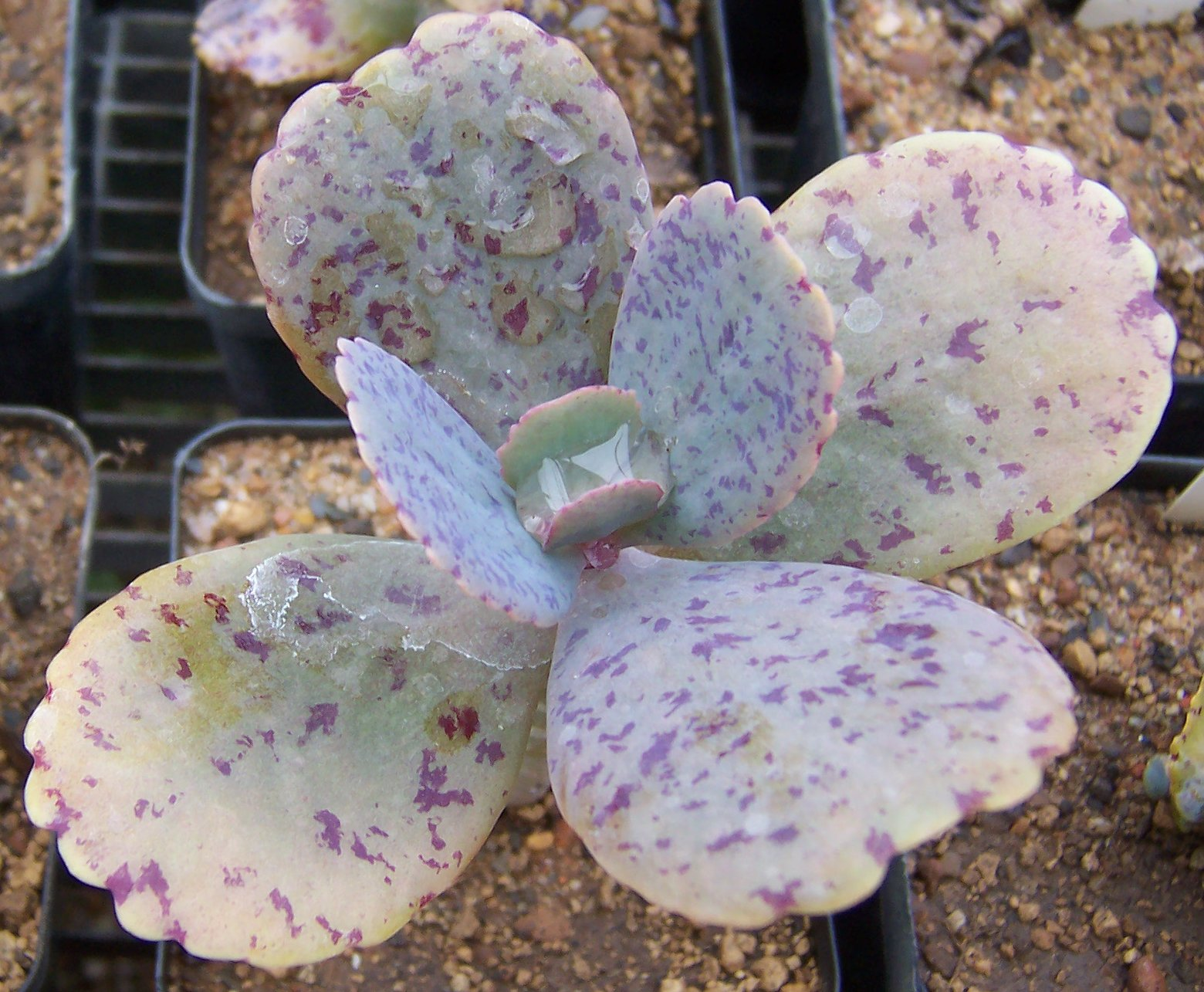
Kalanchoe marmorata

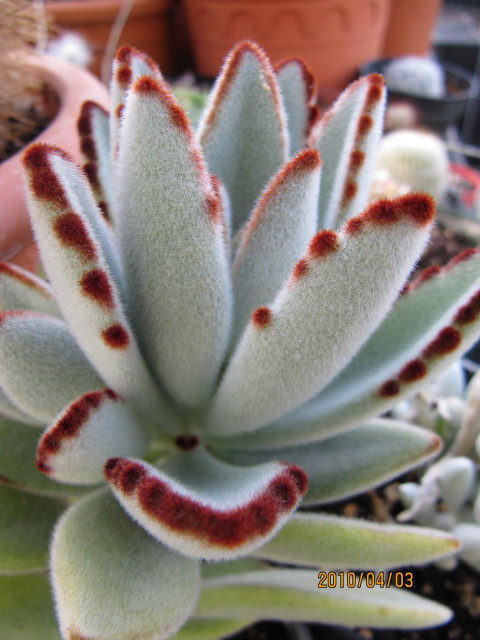
Kalanchoe tomentosa

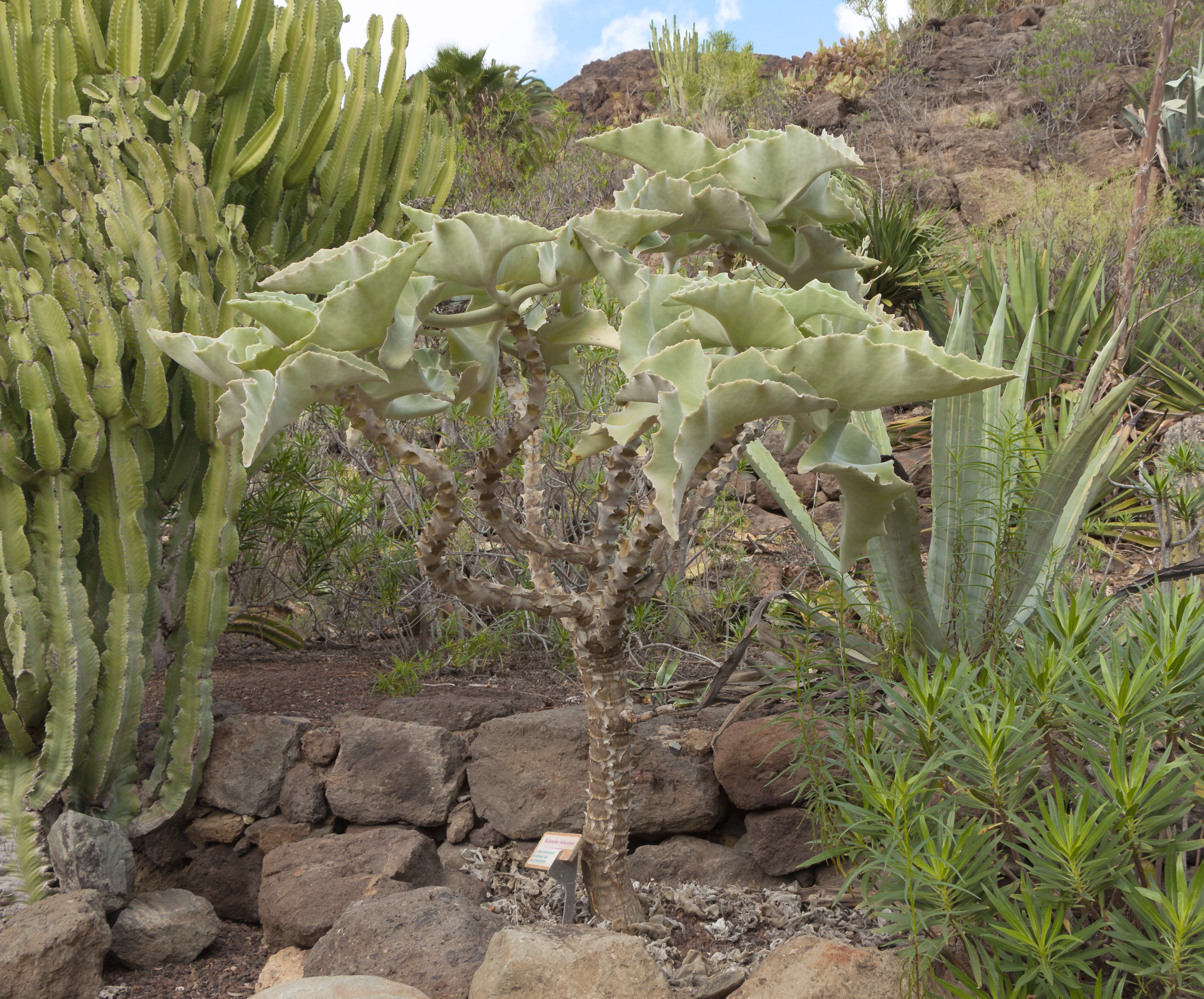
Kalanchoe beharensis

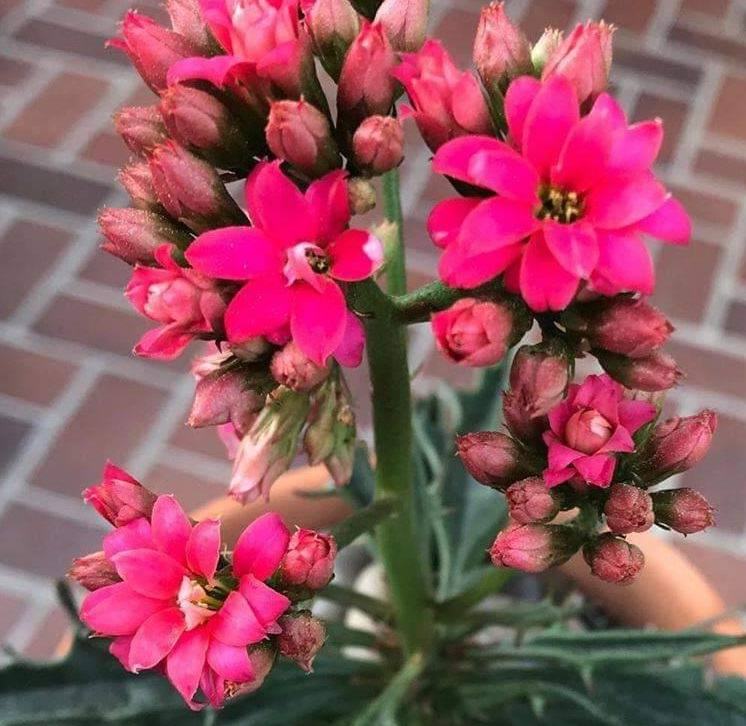
Kalanchoe 'Tarantula'

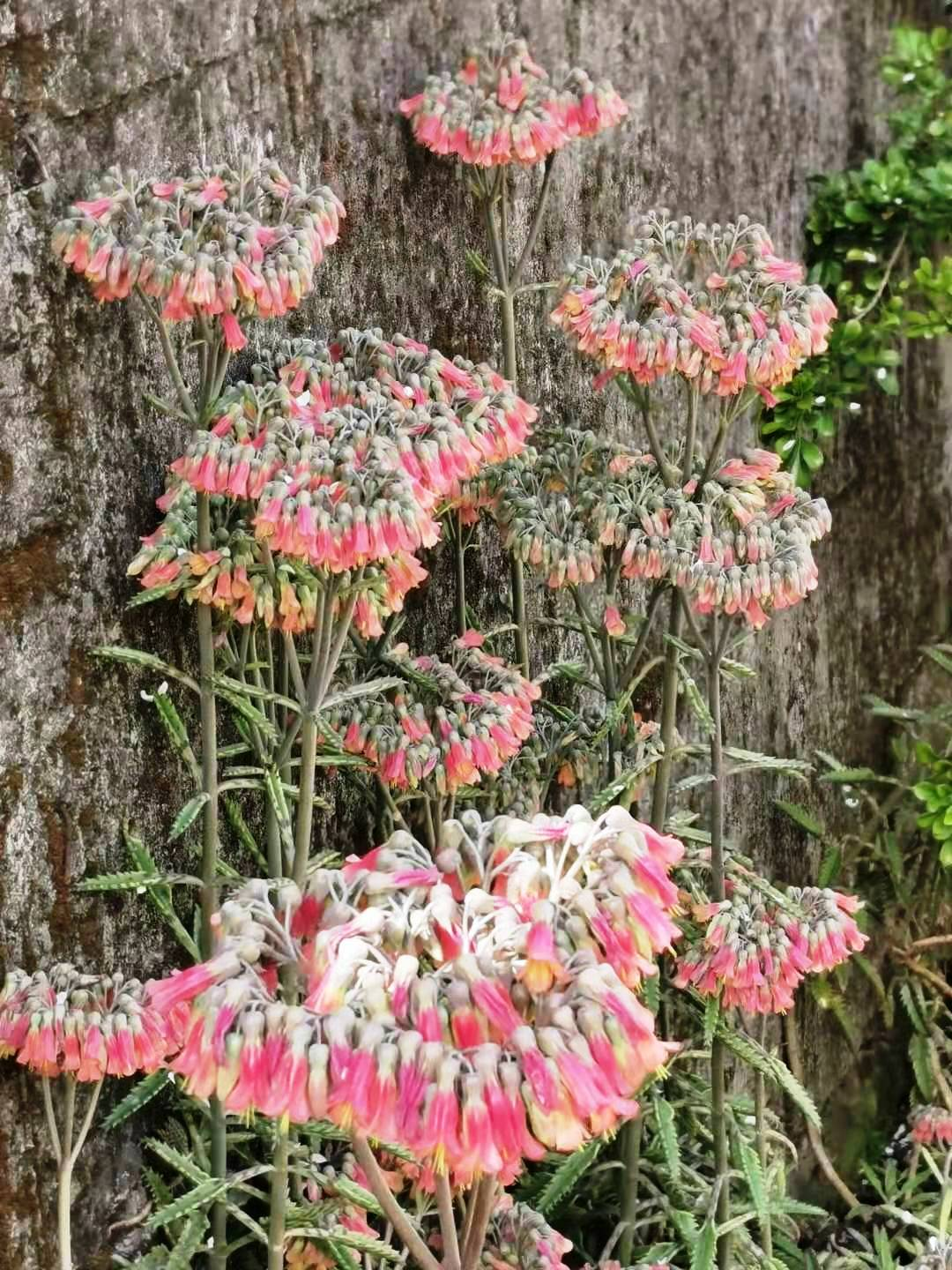
Kalanchoe × houghtonii

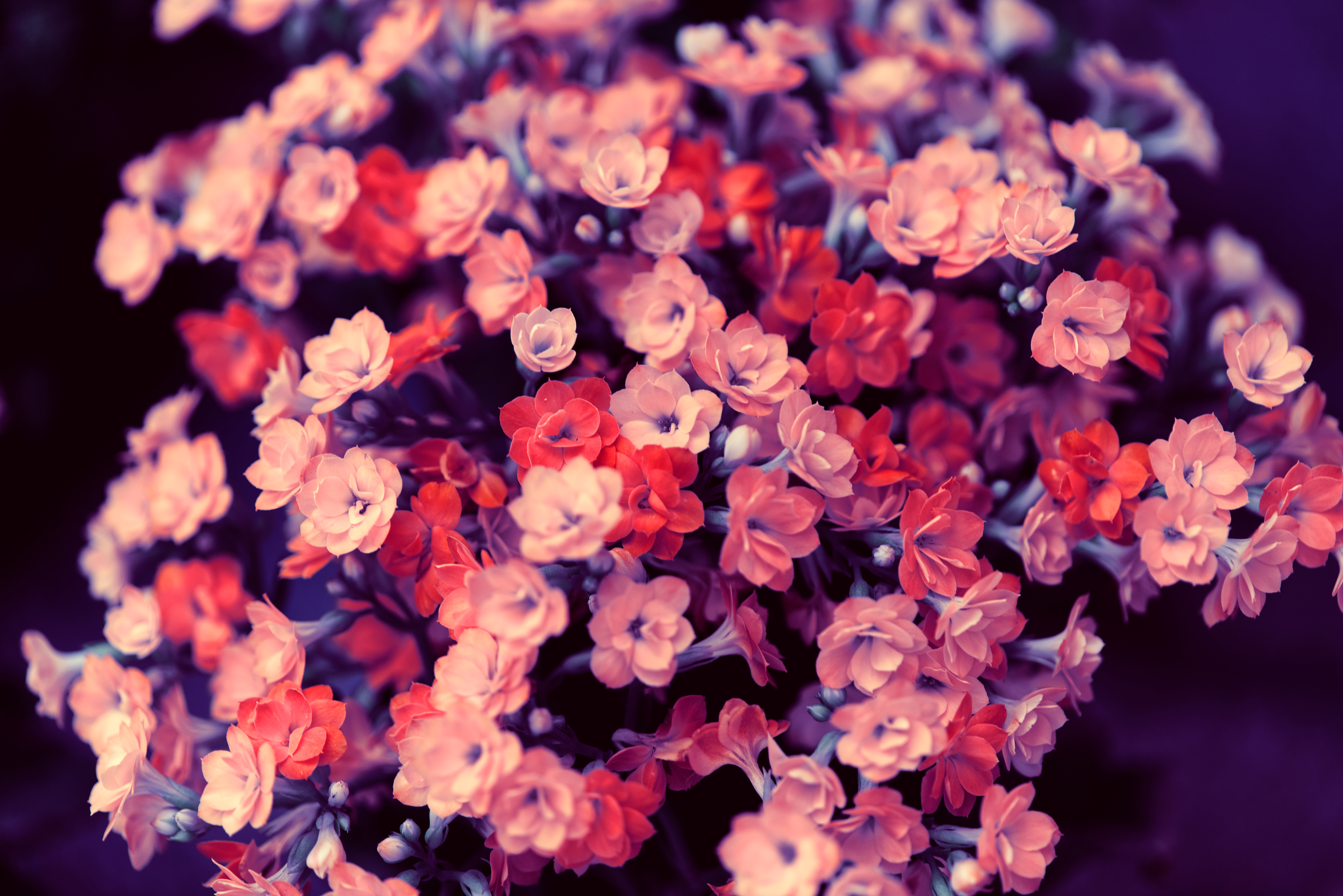
Flaming Katy - Kalanchoe blossfeldiana

== Taxonomy ==
The genus Kalanchoe was first described by the French botanist Michel Adanson in 1763.

The genus Bryophyllum was described by Salisbury in 1806 and the genus Kitchingia was created by Baker in 1881. Kitchingia is now regarded as a synonym for Kalanchoe, while Bryophyllum has also been treated as a separate genus, since species of Bryophyllum appear to be nested within Kalanchoe on molecular phylogenetic analysis, Bryophyllum is considered as a section of the former, dividing the genus into three sections, Kitchingia, Bryophyllum, and Eukalanchoe. these were formalised as subgenera by Smith and Figueiredo (2018).

=== Etymology ===
Adanson cited Georg Joseph Kamel (Camellus) as his source for the name. The name came from the Cantonese name 伽藍菜 (Jyutping: gaa^{1} laam^{4} coi^{3}).

Kalanchoe ceratophylla and Kalanchoe laciniata are both called 伽蓝菜 (apparently "Buddhist monastery [samghārāma] herb") in China. In Mandarin Chinese, it does not seem very close in pronunciation (qiélán cài, but possibly jiālán cài or gālán cài as the character 伽 has multiple pronunciations), but the Cantonese gālàahm choi is closer.

== List of selected species ==
As of September 2026, 185 species are accepted:

- Kalanchoe adelae
- Kalanchoe alternans
- Kalanchoe alticola
- Kalanchoe ambolensis
- Kalanchoe angolensis
- Kalanchoe antennifera
- Kalanchoe apiifolia
- Kalanchoe arborescens
- Kalanchoe aromatica
- Kalanchoe aubrevillei
- Kalanchoe ballyi
- Kalanchoe beauverdii
- Kalanchoe beharensis – velvet leaf, felt plant, felt bush
- Kalanchoe benbothae
- Kalanchoe bentii
- Kalanchoe berevoensis
- Kalanchoe bergeri
- Kalanchoe bhidei
- Kalanchoe bipartita
- Kalanchoe bitteri
- Kalanchoe blossfeldiana – flaming katy, Christmas kalanchoe, florist kalanchoe, Madagascar widow's-thrill
- Kalanchoe bogneri
- Kalanchoe boisii
- Kalanchoe boranae
- Kalanchoe bouvetii
- Kalanchoe brachyloba
- Kalanchoe bracteata
- Kalanchoe brevicalyx
- Kalanchoe briquetii
- Kalanchoe campanulata
- Kalanchoe ceratophylla
- Kalanchoe chapototii
- Kalanchoe cherukondensis
- Kalanchoe chevalieri
- Kalanchoe citrina
- Kalanchoe costantinii
- Kalanchoe crenata
- Kalanchoe crouchii
- Kalanchoe crundallii
- Kalanchoe curvula
- Kalanchoe cymbifolia
- Kalanchoe daigremontiana – Devil's backbone, Mexican-hat plant, mother of thousands
- Kalanchoe darainensis
- Kalanchoe decumbens
- Kalanchoe deficiens
- Kalanchoe delagoensis
- Kalanchoe deliae
- Kalanchoe densiflora
- Kalanchoe dineshii
- Kalanchoe dinklagei
- Kalanchoe dyeri
- Kalanchoe elizae
- Kalanchoe eriophylla
- Kalanchoe fadeniorum
- Kalanchoe farinacea
- Kalanchoe faustii
- Kalanchoe fedtschenkoi
- Kalanchoe fernandesii
- Kalanchoe gastonis-bonnieri – donkey ears, life plant
- Kalanchoe germanae
- Kalanchoe gideonsmithii
- Kalanchoe glaucescens
- Kalanchoe globulifera
- Kalanchoe gracilipes
- Kalanchoe grandidieri
- Kalanchoe grandiflora
- Kalanchoe hildebrantii – silver teaspoons
- Kalanchoe humilis - Desert Surprise
- Kalanchoe jongmansii
- Kalanchoe kewensis
- Kalanchoe laciniata
- kalanchoe laetivirens
- Kalanchoe lanceolata
- Kalanchoe lateritia
- Kalanchoe laxiflora
- Kalanchoe linearifolia
- Kalanchoe longiflora – long-flower kalanchoe
- Kalanchoe luciae – paddle plant
- Kalanchoe macrochlamys
- Kalanchoe manginii – beach bells
- Kalanchoe marmorata – penwiper
- Kalanchoe marnieriana
- Kalanchoe millotii
- Kalanchoe miniata
- Kalanchoe mortagei
- Kalanchoe nyikae
- Kalanchoe obtusa
- Kalanchoe orgyalis
- Kalanchoe petitiana
- Kalanchoe pinnata (Lam.) Pers.
- Kalanchoe porphyrocalyx
- Kalanchoe prasina
- Kalanchoe prolifera
- Kalanchoe pubescens
- Kalanchoe pumila
- Kalanchoe quartiniana
- Kalanchoe rhombopilosa – pies from heaven
- Kalanchoe robusta
- Kalanchoe rolandi-bonapartei
- Kalanchoe rosei
- Kalanchoe rotundifolia
- Kalanchoe schizophylla
- Kalanchoe serrata
- Kalanchoe sexangularis
- Kalanchoe streptantha
- Kalanchoe suarezensis
- Kalanchoe synsepala – cup kalanchoe, walking kalanchoe
- Kalanchoe thyrsiflora – flapjacks, desert cabbage, white lady, geelplakkie, meelplakkie, plakkie
- Kalanchoe tomentosa – panda plant
- Kalanchoe uniflora
- Kalanchoe producta
- Kalanchoe viguieri

=== List of selected hybrids ===
- K. descoingsii = K. laetivirens × K. delagoensis
- K. flaurantia = K. bracteata × K. orgyalis
- K. houghtonii = K. daigremontiana × K. delagoensis
- K. hummeliae = K. beharensis × K. millotii
- K. kewensis = K. glaucescens × K. bentii
- K. lokarana = K. laxiflora × K. sp. (K. rosei, K. variifolia, or K. perrieri)
- K. poincarei = K. beauverdii × K. sp. (K. rosei, K. variifolia, K. perrieri, or K. daigremontiana)
- K. rechingeri = K. costantinii × K. delagoensis
- K. richaudii = K. delagoensis × K. sp. (K. rosei, K. variifolia, or K. perrieri)
- K. trageri = K. blossfeldiana × K. pumila
- K. vadensis = K. blossfeldiana × K. grandiflora

== Distribution and ecology ==
The genus is predominantly native to the Old World. Only one species originates from the Americas. Fifty-six are from southern and eastern Africa and 60 species on the island of Madagascar. It is also found in south-eastern Asia and China.

These plants are food plants for caterpillars of the Red Pierrot butterfly. The butterfly lays its eggs on leaves, and after hatching, caterpillars burrow into the leaves and eat their inside cells.

== Cultivation and uses ==
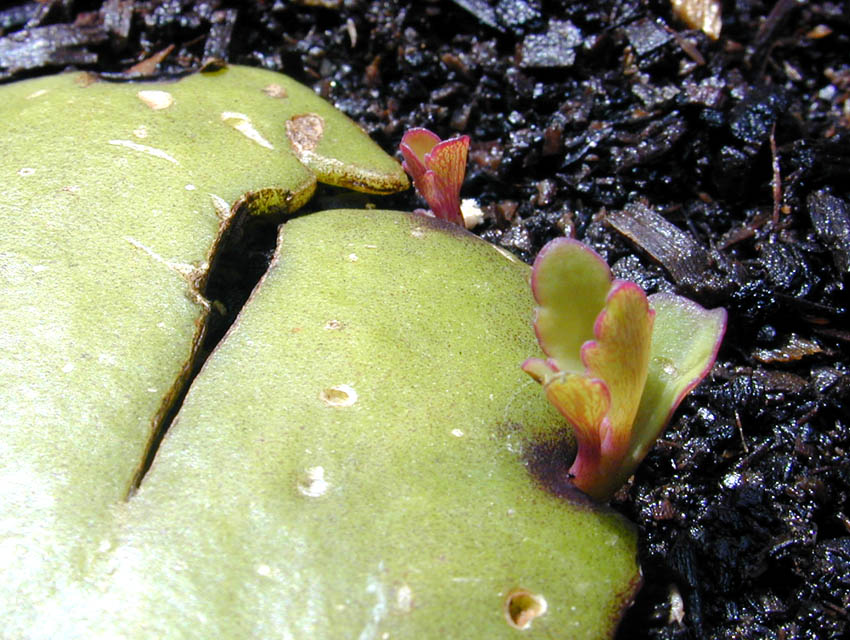
Production of new individuals along a leaf margin of the air plant, Kalanchoe pinnata. The small plant in front is about 1 cm tall

These plants are cultivated as ornamental houseplants and rock or succulent garden plants. They are popular because of their ease of propagation, low water requirements, and wide variety of flower colors typically borne in clusters well above the leaves. The section Bryophyllum—formerly an independent genus—contains species such as the "air-plant" Kalanchoe pinnata. In these plants, new individuals develop vegetatively as plantlets, also known as bulbils or gemmae, at indentations in leaf margins. These young plants eventually drop off and take root. No males have been found of one species of this genus which does flower and produce seeds, and it is commonly called the mother of thousands: Kalanchoe daigremontiana is thus an example of asexual reproduction.

The cultivars 'Tessa' and 'Wendy' have gained the Royal Horticultural Society's Award of Garden Merit.

== Traditional medicine ==
In traditional medicine, Kalanchoe species have been used to treat ailments such as infections, rheumatism and inflammation. Kalanchoe extracts also have immunosuppressive effects. Kalanchoe pinnata has been recorded in Trinidad and Tobago as being used as a traditional treatment for hypertension.

A variety of bufadienolide compounds have been isolated from various Kalanchoe species. Five different bufadienolides have been isolated from Kalanchoe daigremontiana. Two of these, daigremontianin and bersaldegenin 1,3,5-orthoacetate, have been shown to have a pronounced sedative effect. They also have the strong positive inotropic effect associated with cardiac glycosides, and with greater doses an increasing effect on the central nervous system.

Bufadienolide compounds isolated from Kalanchoe pinnata include bryophillin A which showed strong anti-tumor promoting activity, and bersaldegenin-3-acetate and bryophillin C which were less active. Bryophillin C also showed insecticidal properties.

== Gallery ==
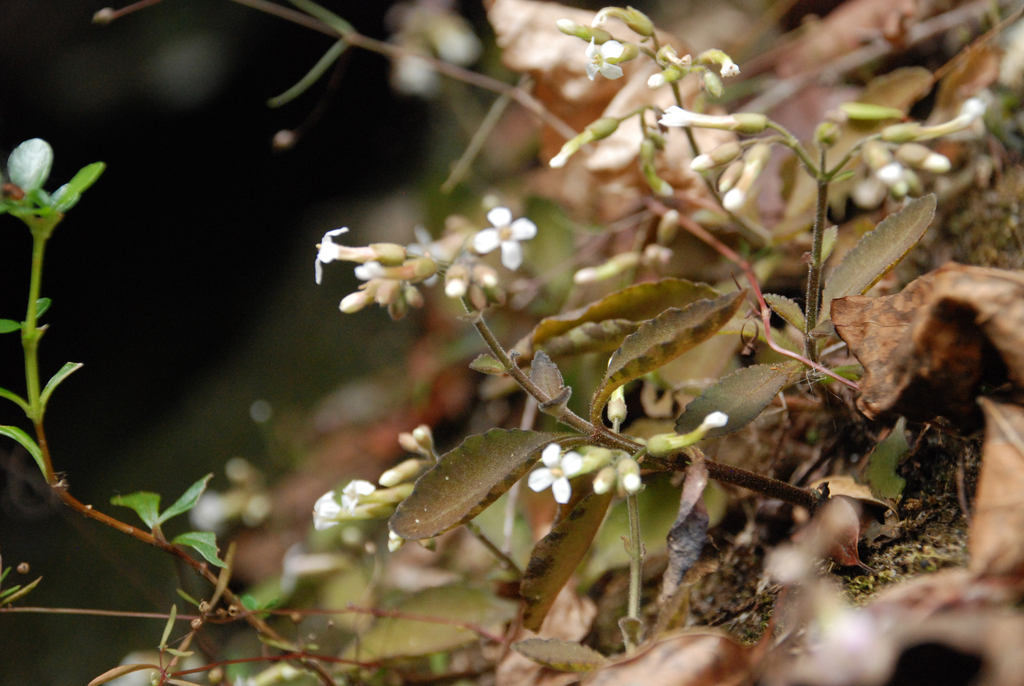

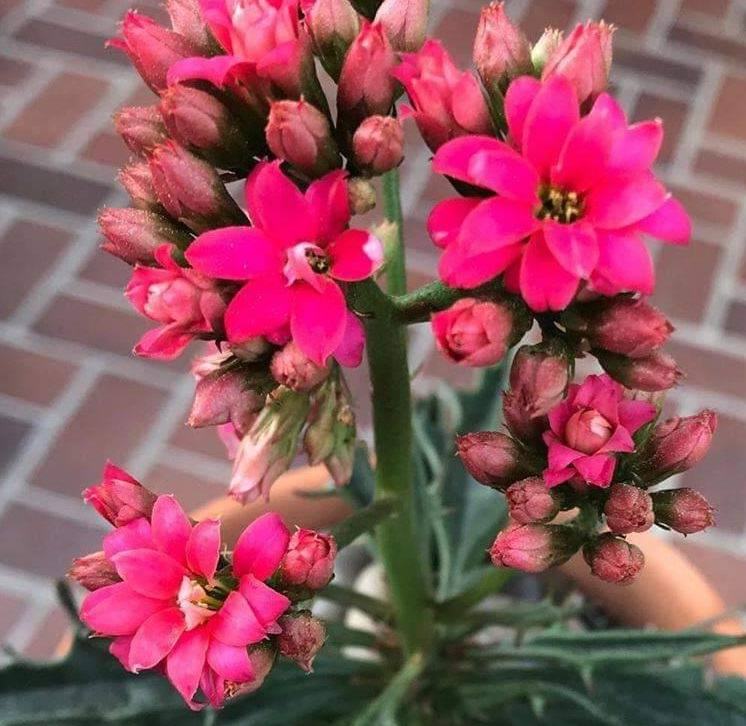

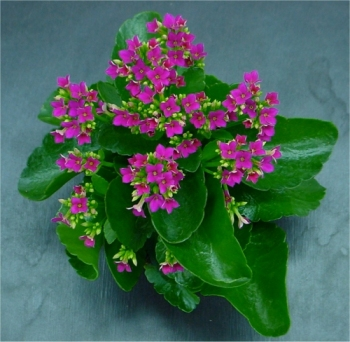

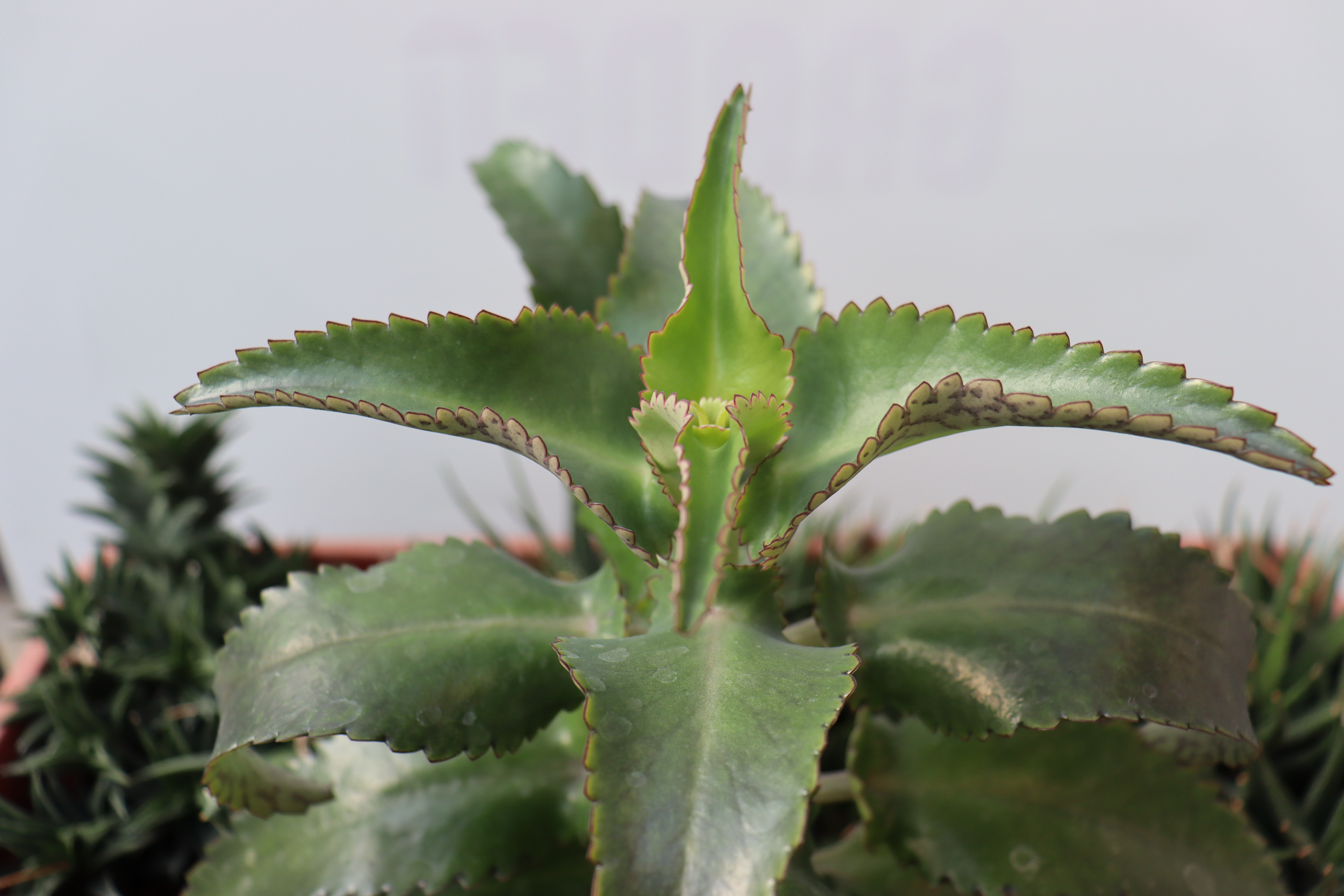

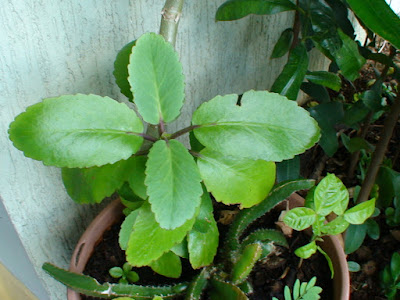

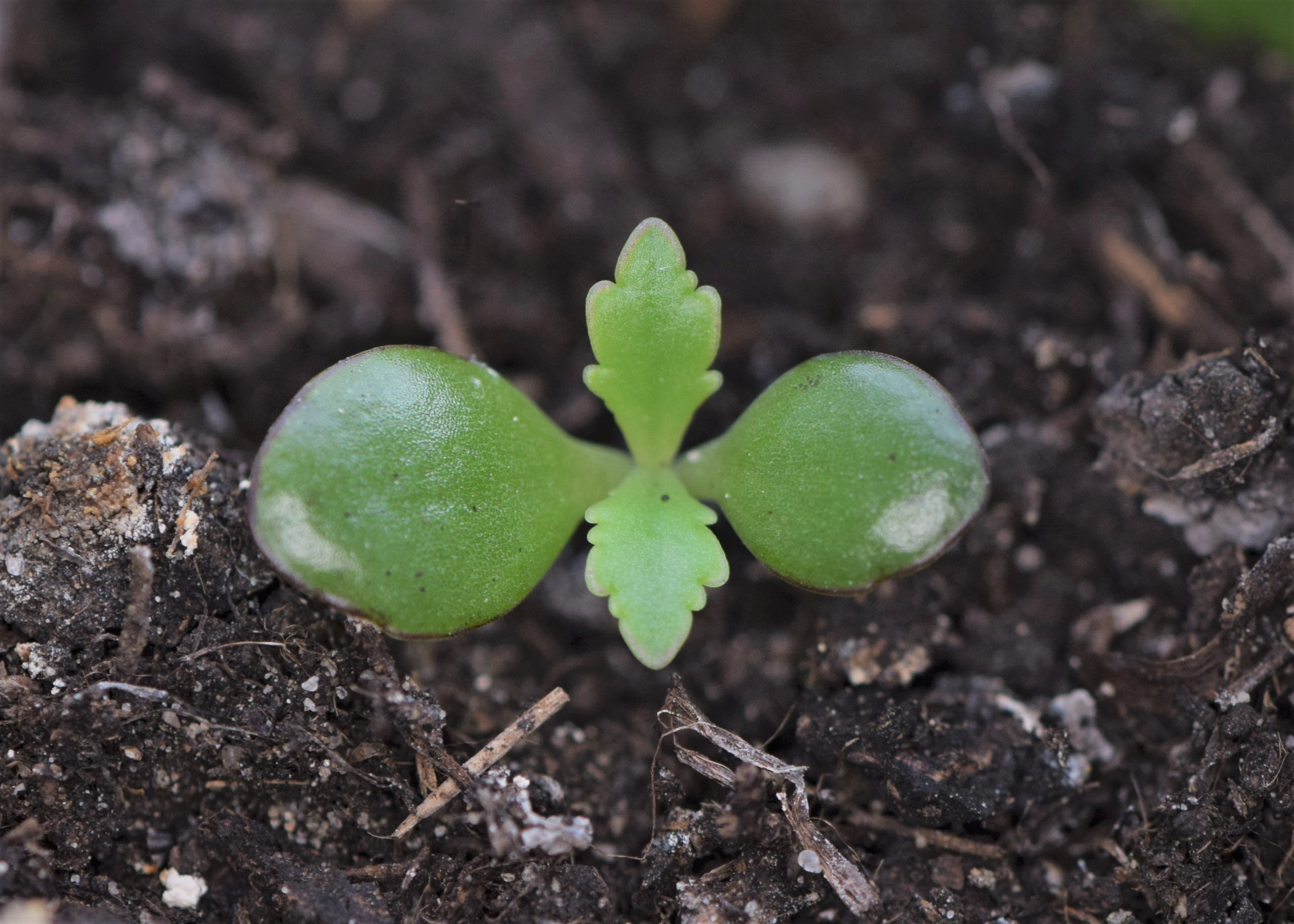

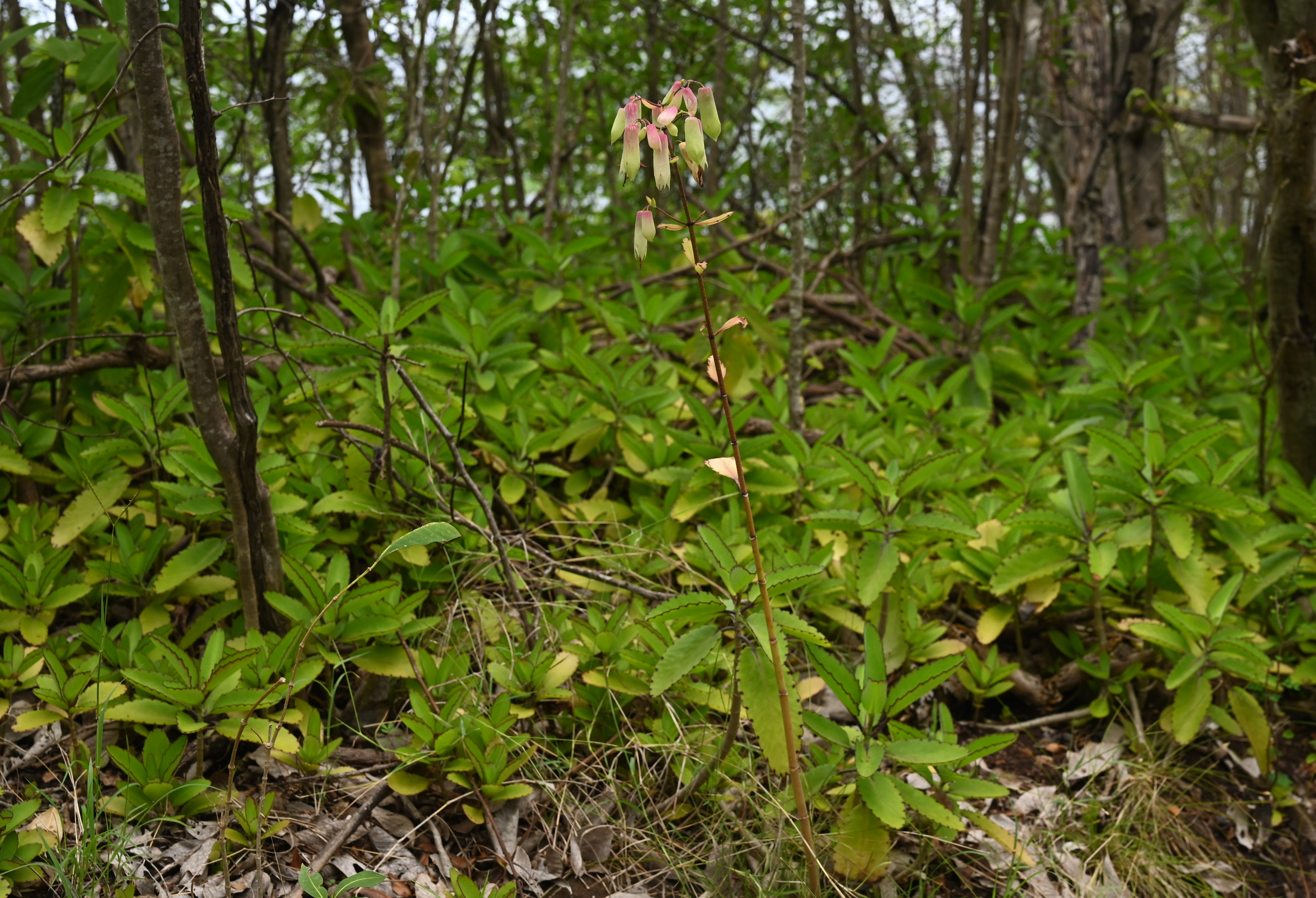

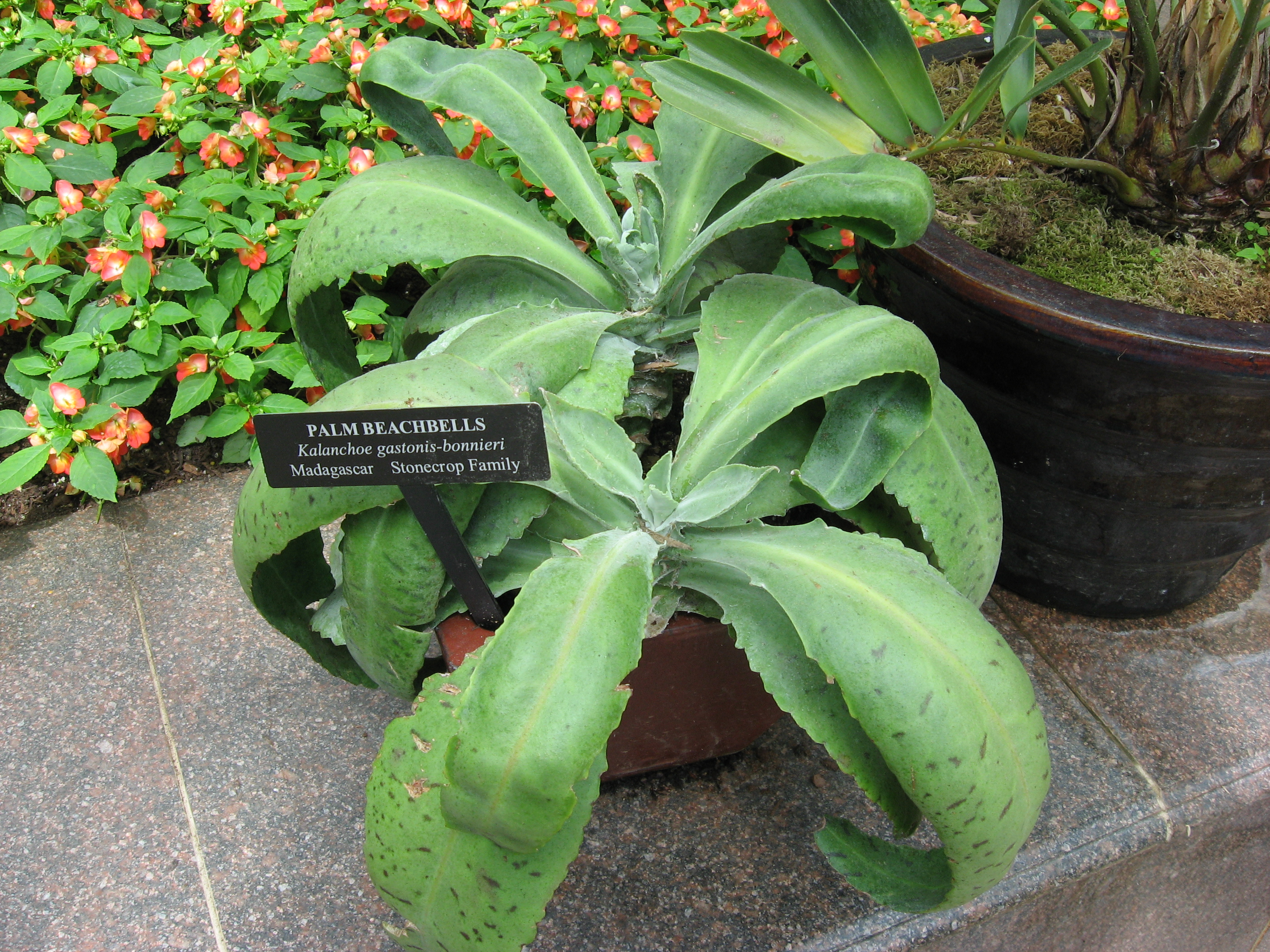

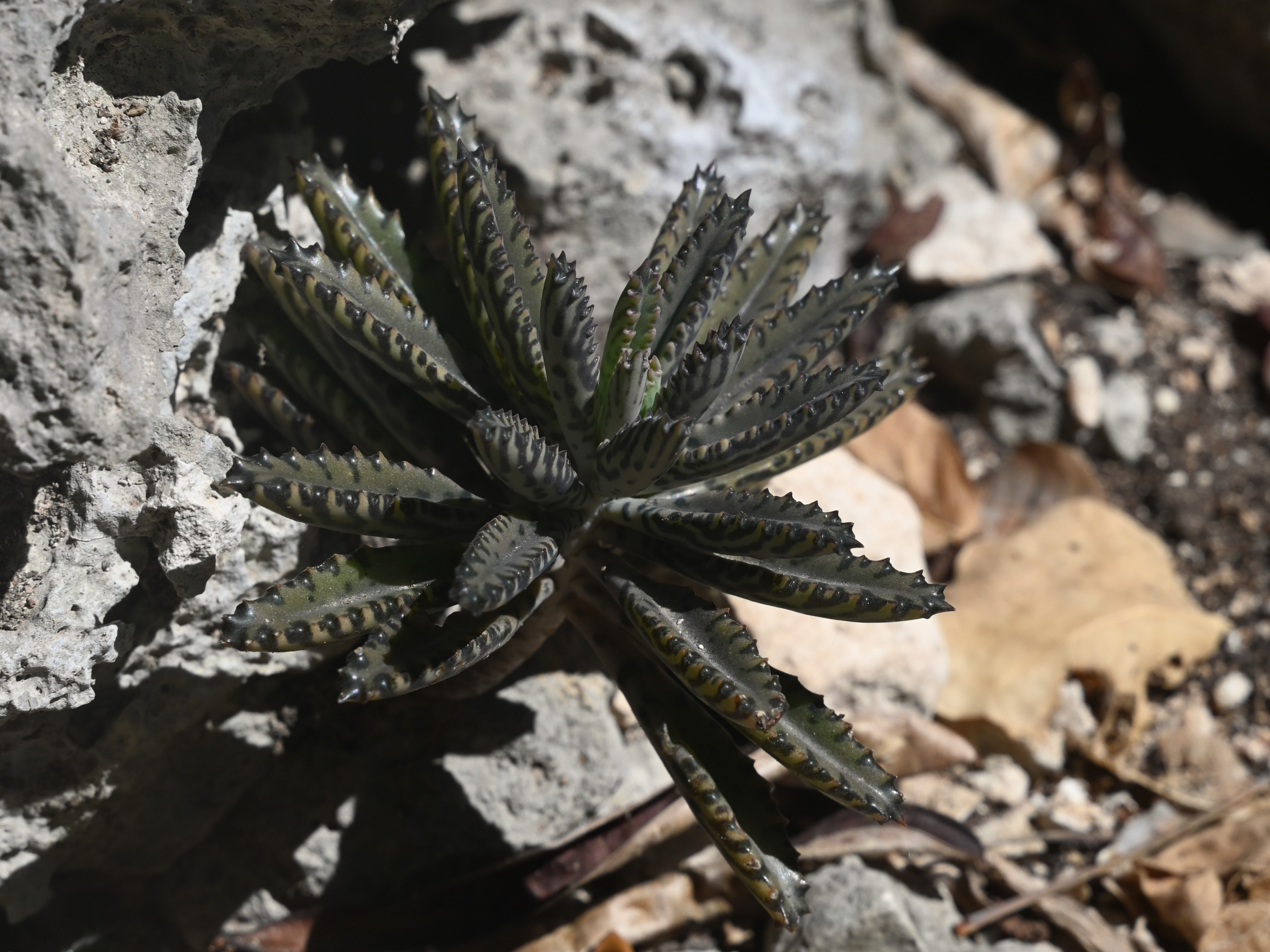

== Bibliography ==
- Eggli, Urs, ed. (2003). Illustrated Handbook of Succulent Plants: Crassulaceae. Springer Science & Business Media. doi:10.1007/978-3-642-55874-0. ISBN 978-3-642-55874-0. S2CID 36280482.
- Smith, Gideon F.; Figueiredo, Estrela; Wyk, Abraham E. van (2019). Kalanchoe (Crassulaceae) in Southern Africa: Classification, Biology, and Cultivation. Elsevier Science. ISBN 978-0-12-814008-6.
- Mort, Mark E.; Soltis, Douglas E.; Soltis, Pamela S.; Francisco-Ortega, Javier; Santos-Guerra, Arnoldo (January 2001). "Phylogenetic relationships and evolution of Crassulaceae inferred from matK sequence data". American Journal of Botany. 88 (1): 76–91. doi:10.2307/2657129. JSTOR 2657129. PMID 11159129.
- Mort, Mark E; O'Leary, T. Ryan; Carrillo-Reyes, Pablo; et al. (December 2009). "Phylogeny and evolution of Crassulaceae: Past, present, and future". Biodiversity & Ecology. 3: 69–86.
- Smith, Gideon F.; Figueiredo, Estrela (July 2018). "The infrageneric classification and nomenclature of Kalanchoe Adans. (Crassulaceae), with special reference to the southern African species". Bradleya. 36 (36): 162–172. Bibcode:2018Bradl..36..162S. doi:10.25223/brad.n36.2018.a10. S2CID 92407878.
- "Kalanchoe Adans". Plants of the World Online. Royal Botanic Gardens, Kew. 2019.
