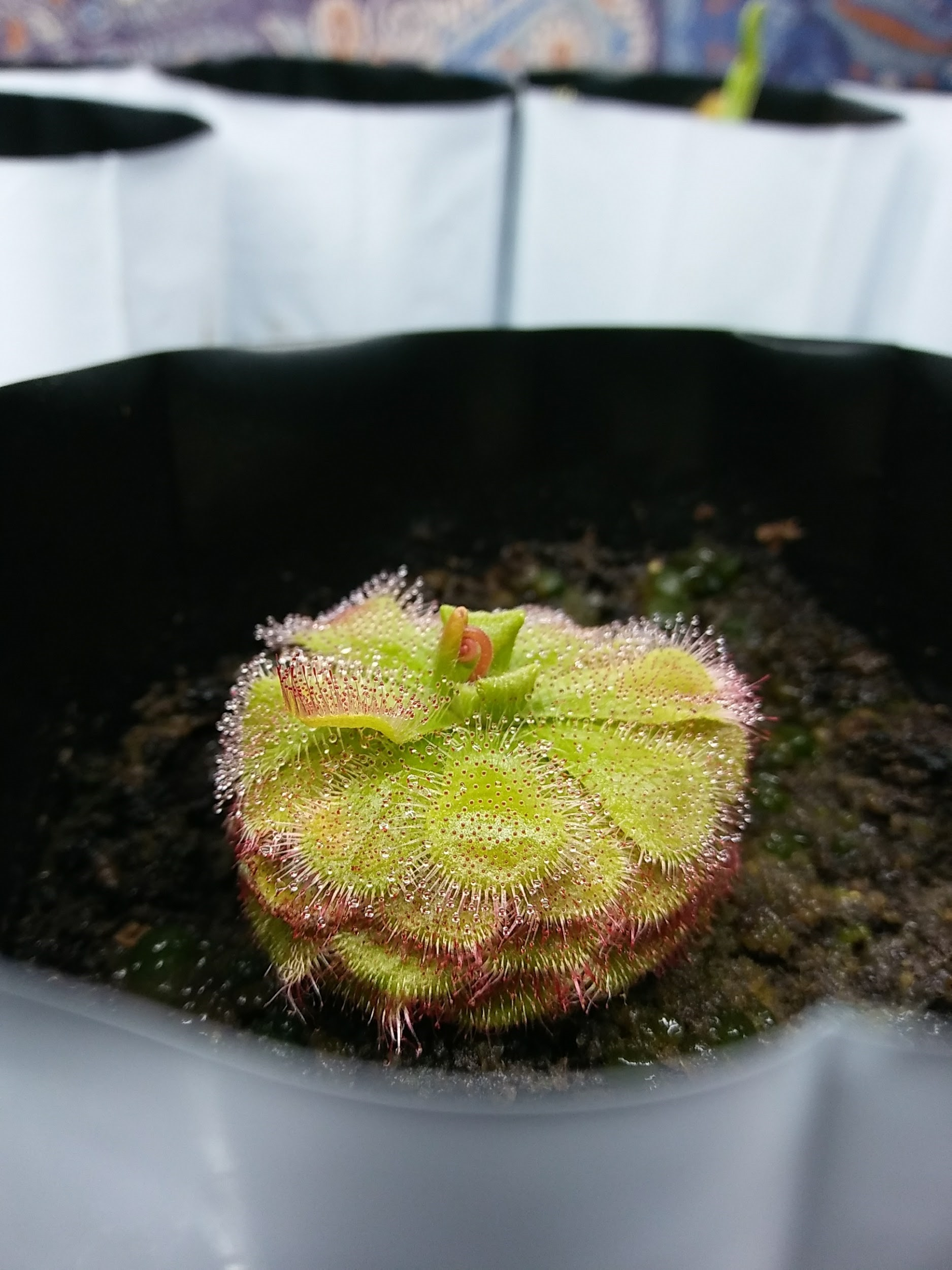
- A fully mature Drosera admirabilis. Note the emerging flower stalk from the center.
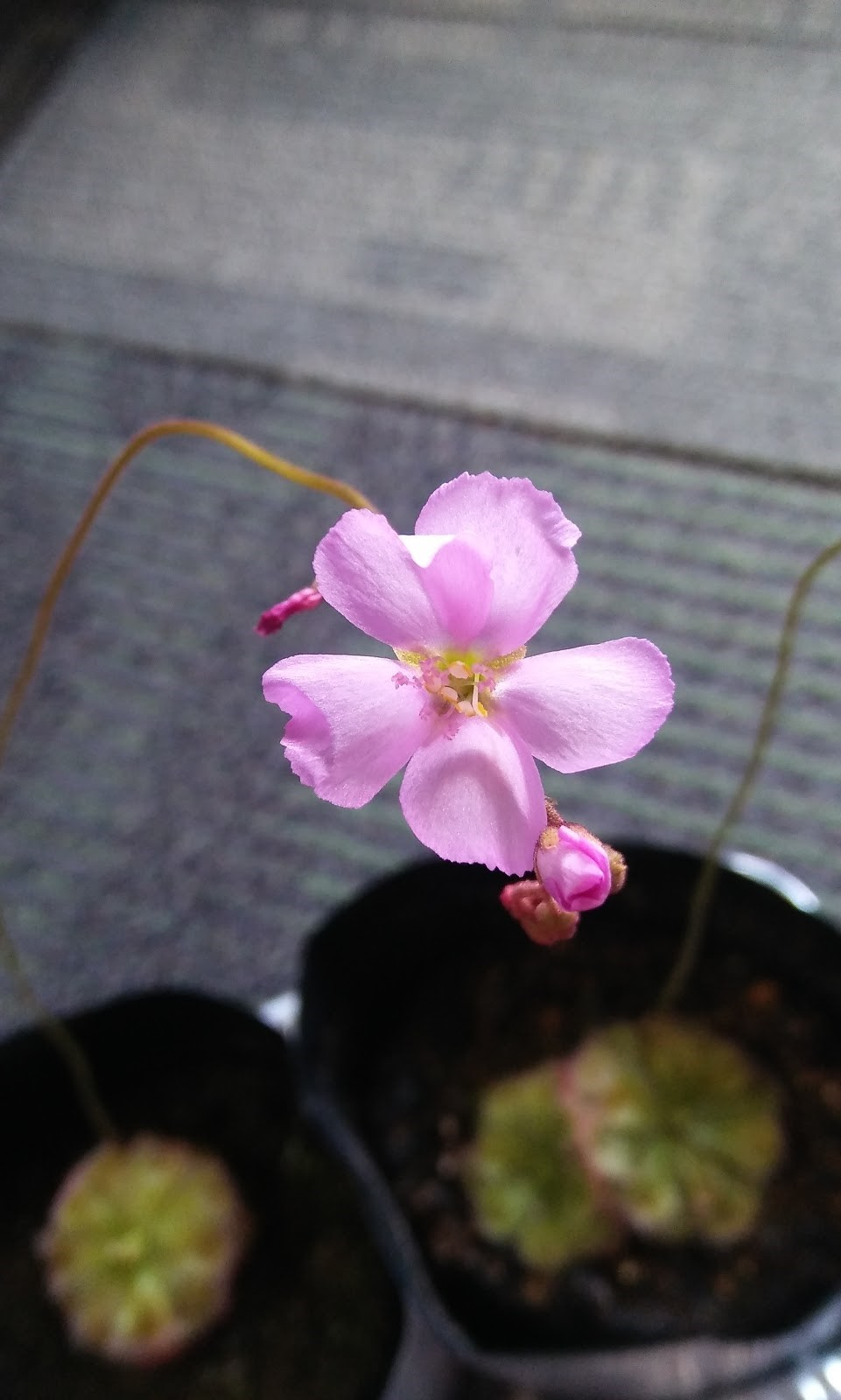
- D. admirabilis flower

Scientific classification
- Kingdom: Plantae
- Clade: Tracheophytes
- Clade: Angiosperms
- Clade: Eudicots
- Order: Caryophyllales
- Family: Droseraceae
- Genus: Drosera
- Subgenus: Drosera subg. Drosera
- Section: Drosera sect. Drosera
- Species: D. admirabilis

Binomial name
- Drosera admirabilis Debbert

= Drosera admirabilis =

Species of carnivorous plant

Drosera admirabilis, sometimes referred to as the "floating sundew", is in the carnivorous plant family Droseraceae. The species was first described by Paul Debbert in 1987 and is native to the south-western Cape Province of South Africa.

Structurally similar to Drosera aliciae, and Drosera cuneifolia, the D. admirabilis grows in a single tight rosette-shaped leaf bundle. The leaves widen towards the end and have rounded tips. Leaves lay horizontally under proper lighting conditions. Like many other African sundews, D. admirabilis is a perennial. D. admirabilis has outer tentacles like those of Drosera glanduligera, Drosera sessilifolia and Drosera burmanni which briefly after stimulation bend towards the prey.

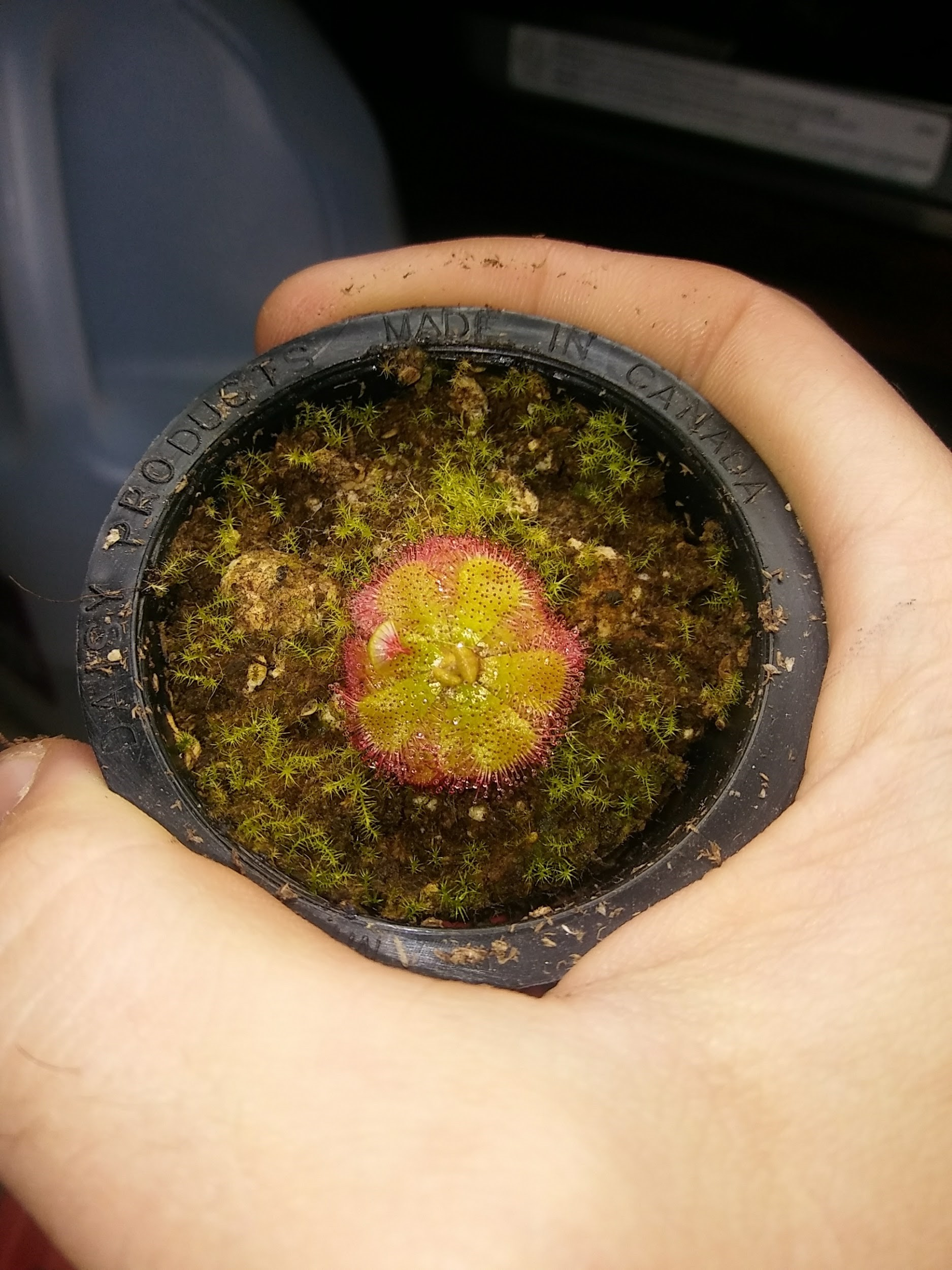
A small D. admirabilis. Note the red-tinted trichomes from ample amounts of lighting.

== Reproduction ==
This sundew will flower several times from spring to fall if given proper environmental conditions. The flowers of D. admirabilis sit on top of a 20–30 cm stalk which bend horizontally as each flower opens. Only one flower usually opens each day, opening up early in the morning, and is fully closed by the last light of the day. Its flowers are typically 1 cm in diameter with five light-violet petals and ten yellow anthers in the center, surrounded by six light-violet stigmas.

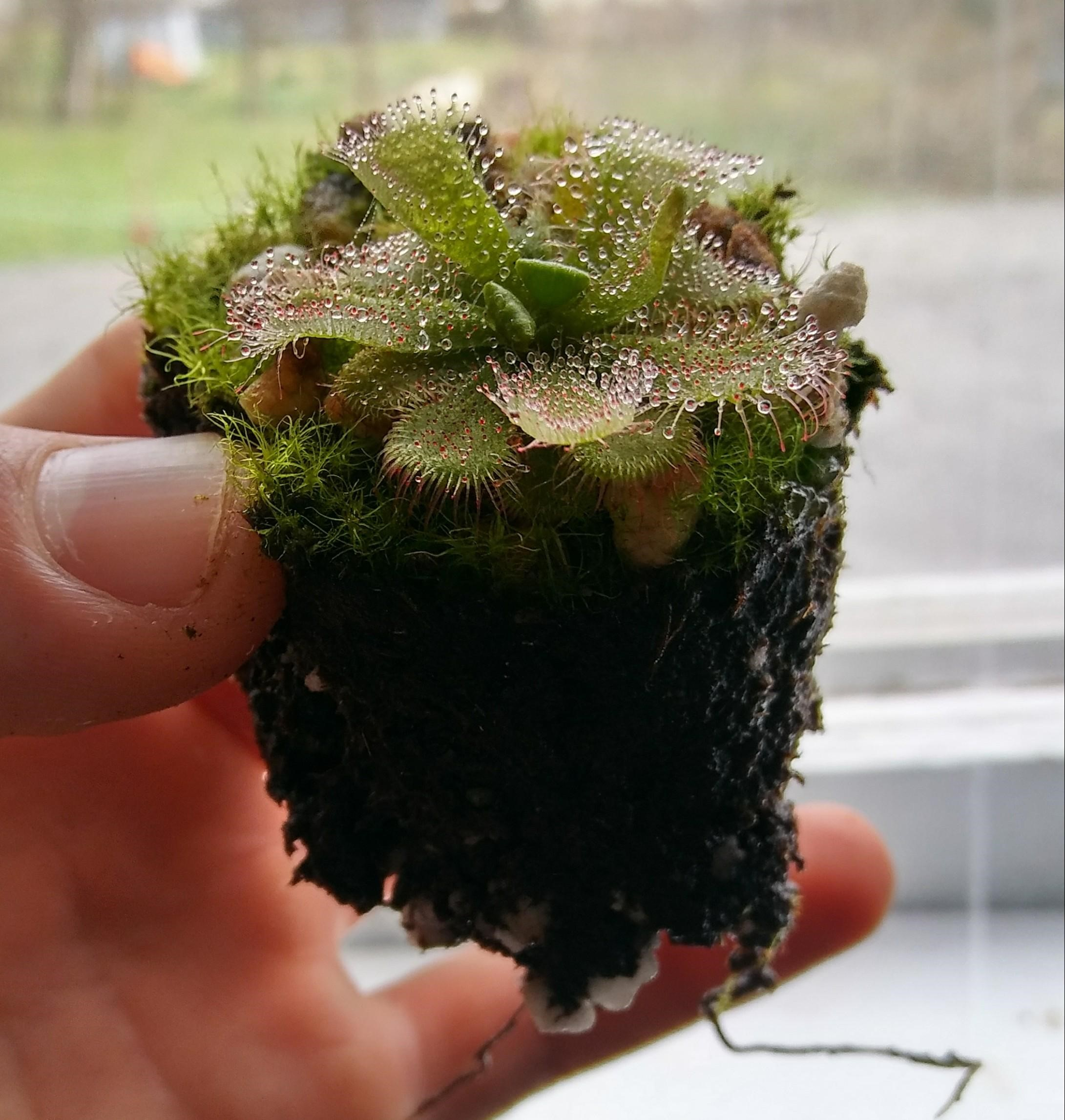
A transplant of a medium-sized D. admirabilis. Note the long roots, as well as its outer leaf tentacles.

Like many other species in the genus Drosera, D. admirabilis is easily propagated by several methods. Seeds, root (easy) and leaf (more challenging than from other South African species) cuttings are standard ways to asexually propagate this species.

== Cultivation ==
A fully mature D. admirabilis takes about one full year and can grow to about 5 cm in diameter, while reaching over 8 cm tall. This sundew can grow all year long without any dormancy period. It gets marketed with the name "floating sundew" because a fully mature specimen looks like it is hovering because new leaves are above vertically stacked old leaves. When the plant receives ample amounts of light its trichomes can darken from a green to a deep red.

It can tolerate a wide range of temperatures but prefers to stay 70–80 °F (21–27 °C). D. admirabilis does well in all ranges of humidity if properly watered, but optimal humidity is maintained within 25–50%.

If grown indoors/greenhouse, a slightly acidic soil mixture such as 1:1 peat to sand ratio supplements best for cultivating D. admirabilis. Its roots grow deep into its substrate, thus a taller pot is preferred when housing a fully grown D. admirabilis.
