= Raym =

Raym may refer to:

- Raum, a demon also spelled Raym
- Andrew Raym (born 2001), American football player
- Raym.-Hamet, botanical author abbreviation
