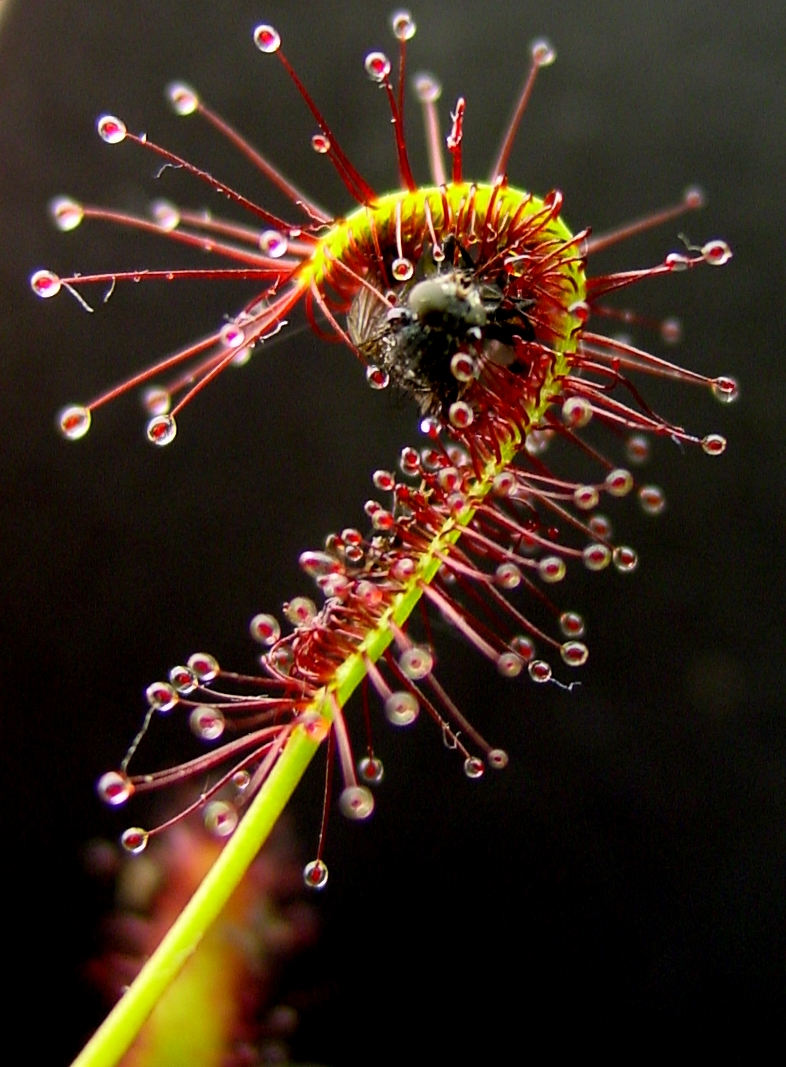
- Leaf of Drosera capensis bending around a captured insect

Scientific classification
- Kingdom: Plantae
- Clade: Tracheophytes
- Clade: Angiosperms
- Clade: Eudicots
- Order: Caryophyllales
- Family: Droseraceae
- Genus: Drosera
- Subgenus: Drosera subg. Drosera
- Section: Drosera sect. Ptycnostigma
- Species: D. capensis

Binomial name
- Drosera capensis L.

= Drosera capensis =

Species of carnivorous plant

Drosera capensis (/ˈdrɒsərə kəˈpɛnsɪs/), the Cape sundew, is a perennial rosette-forming carnivorous herb in the flowering plant family Droseraceae. It is native to the Cape region of South Africa, where it grows in permanently wet, nutrient-poor habitats. Its elongated, roughly oblong leaves are held semi-erect and have a distinct petiole. It is quite a variable plant with several recognised growth forms, some of which develop a short stem. As in all sundews, the leaves are covered in stalked glands that secrete sticky mucilage. These attract, trap, and digest arthropod prey, obtaining nutrients that supplement intake from the substrate in which the plant grows. D. capensis has dramatically mobile leaves that curl around captured prey, preventing its escape and facilitating digestion.

First recorded in the late 17th century, D. capensis was one of the five Drosera species included in the first edition of Carl Linnaeus' Species plantarum. A relatively large, 'showy' species that flowers readily and is considered very easy to grow, it was cultivated in Europe as a curiosity from the mid-18th century and is now one of the most widely grown sundews. It has also been extensively studied, including as a potential source of bioactive compounds of pharmacological interest, and was the first sundew to undergo whole-genome sequencing. Although often uncommon and localised in its native range, it has become naturalised in several countries following deliberate introductions and is listed as an invasive species in New Zealand.

== Characteristics ==
=== Habit ===
D. capensis is a perennial herb forming a rosette typically 10–15 cm (4–6 in) in diameter, although occasionally up to 30 cm (12 in). Its narrow, oblong leaves are held semi-erect. As in all sundew species, the laminae are covered with stalked glands ("tentacles") that secrete a sticky mucilage. These attract, trap, and digest insects and other arthropods as prey. New leaves grow from the centre of the rosette and the remains of old leaves gradually form a short stem, typically around 4 cm (1.6 in) in length but sometimes as long as 15 cm (5.9 in). The roots are sparse, thickened, and attain a length around 15–20 cm (6–8 in), rarely branching. In summer, the plant produces one or two relatively tall inflorescences, each with between 15 and 30 flowers. The petals are typically pale purple.

==== Growth forms ====
D. capensis is quite variable across its range, and several distinct forms have been informally identified. In his 1986 book Insect-eating Plants and How to Grow Them, Adrian Slack referred to two forms:

- "typical" form with laminae up to 8 mm (0.31 in) wide and 38 mm (1.5 in) long, flowers up to 2 cm (0.79 in) wide, which develops a stem and a semi-trailing habit
- "narrow-leaf" form, smaller overall, with narrower leaves, minimal stem formation, and smaller flowers that are produced earlier

Peter D'Amato described four forms in his 1998 book The Savage Garden: Cultivating Carnivorous Plants:

- D. capensis - "typical" with red-tentacled leaves 3–6 in (7.6–15.2 cm) long, and forming a scrambling stem
- D. capensis - "narrow" with narrow leaves and less tendency to form a stem
- D. capensis - "alba" similar to the "narrow" form but with white flowers and pale tentacles
- D. capensis - "red" similar to the "narrow" form but entirely reddish-maroon in colour when growing in bright light, with deep pink flowers

Robert Gibson noted the difficulty of assigning unlabelled plants to any of the informally described forms, due to short descriptions and the plants' variation in response to growing conditions. He detailed nine different forms:

Drosera capensis forms informally described by Gibson (2020)
Form	Habit	Leaves	Petiole	Lamina	Flowers	Stigmas	Stem	Localities
Wide-leaved	Robust	Green, underside sparsely covered with eglandular hairs	>3 mm wide, about 60% width of lamina	>3 mm, up to 8mm wide	Large, ~3 cm, usually dark purple	Irregularly obovate to elliptic, widening conspicuously from terete style segments	Conspicuous, to 15 cm	Western part of Western Cape: Silvermine Nature Reserve; Vogelgat Private Nature Reserve; former Bergvliet Farm
Narrow-leaved	Typical	Olive green to reddish, to about 12 cm long, underside sparsely covered with eglandular hairs	<=3 mm	<=3 mm, similar length to petiole and up to twice the width	~2 cm, pale purple	Terete to narrowly ovate	None, or up to 5 cm in older plants	Typical form in the wild
Red-leaved	Typical	Vibrant red under bright illumination, underside with few eglandular hairs	As narrow-leaved	As narrow-leaved	Up to 2 cm, style segments dark purple	Irregularly ovate	As narrow-leaved	Primarily Gifberg, but also Travellers Rest, Koue Bokkeveld plateau and Table Mountain
White-flowered	Typical	Golden green; tentacles with colourless stalks and green to pale red glands	As narrow-leaved	As narrow-leaved	10–14 mm, white petals	Moderately expanded	(not described)	Appears to have emerged spontaneously in cultivation
Mini	Compact	Olive-green, congested	1.5–2 mm	3–4 mm	Up to 2 cm, dark purple, on disproportionately tall scape	(not described)	At most a few cm long	High mountain areas near Ceres, Bainskloof (Matroosberg), upper slopes of Baviaanskloof between 1000 and 1800 m
Traveller's Rest	Giant	Green or fully red, very large (rosettes to ~30 cm)	Longer than lamina, about 2 mm wide	About 3 mm wide	About 1.5 cm, pale purple, style segments terete		(not described)	Banks of Doring River at Traveller's Rest, east of Clanwilliam
Paddle-shape leaved (1)	Sparse, reminiscent of D. anglica	Green	~2 mm	~6 mm	(not described)	(not described)	(not described)	Very wet site at Gydo Pass near Ceres, ~1000m
Paddle-shape leaved (2)	Open with distinct internodes	Green	(as previous?)	(as previous?)	(not described)	(not described)	Conspicuous	Bainskloof Pass, also possibly Waaihoekskloof near Ceres, and Montague Pass.
Paddle-shape leaved (3)	Compact	To 6 cm long, spirally arranged, underside with abundant eglandular hairs	To 1 mm wide	To 3 mm wide	Up to 1.6 cm wide, petals dark purple	Dark purple, irregularly obovate	Formed only very slowly	In cultivation, origin not known

Gibson also noted occasional plants of the narrow-leaved form with enlarged bracteoles with insect-trapping hairs, and some red-leaved plants developing a row of insect-trapping hairs on the petals.

=== Leaves and carnivory ===
==== Morphology ====
D. capensis has elongated, roughly rectangular leaves with a distinct petiole typically similar in length to the lamina, although in some growth forms it may be significantly longer. Vernation is geniculate-involute, the lamina first unfolding from the petiole, and the lamina margin and tentacles unfurling outward from the leaf axis.

In section, the petiole is a narrow trapezoid with a thickened midrib on the lower (abaxial) side. It has a covering of fine, translucent white hairs, sparse on the upper (adaxial) surface and sparse to moderate on the lower surface.

The lamina is usually slightly wider than the petiole. It has long, glandular hairs (tentacles) around the margins of the upper surface, surrounding shorter glandular hairs in the middle of the lamina. The lower surface of the lamina lacks tentacles but has a sparse to moderate covering of shorter, translucent white, spreading hairs.

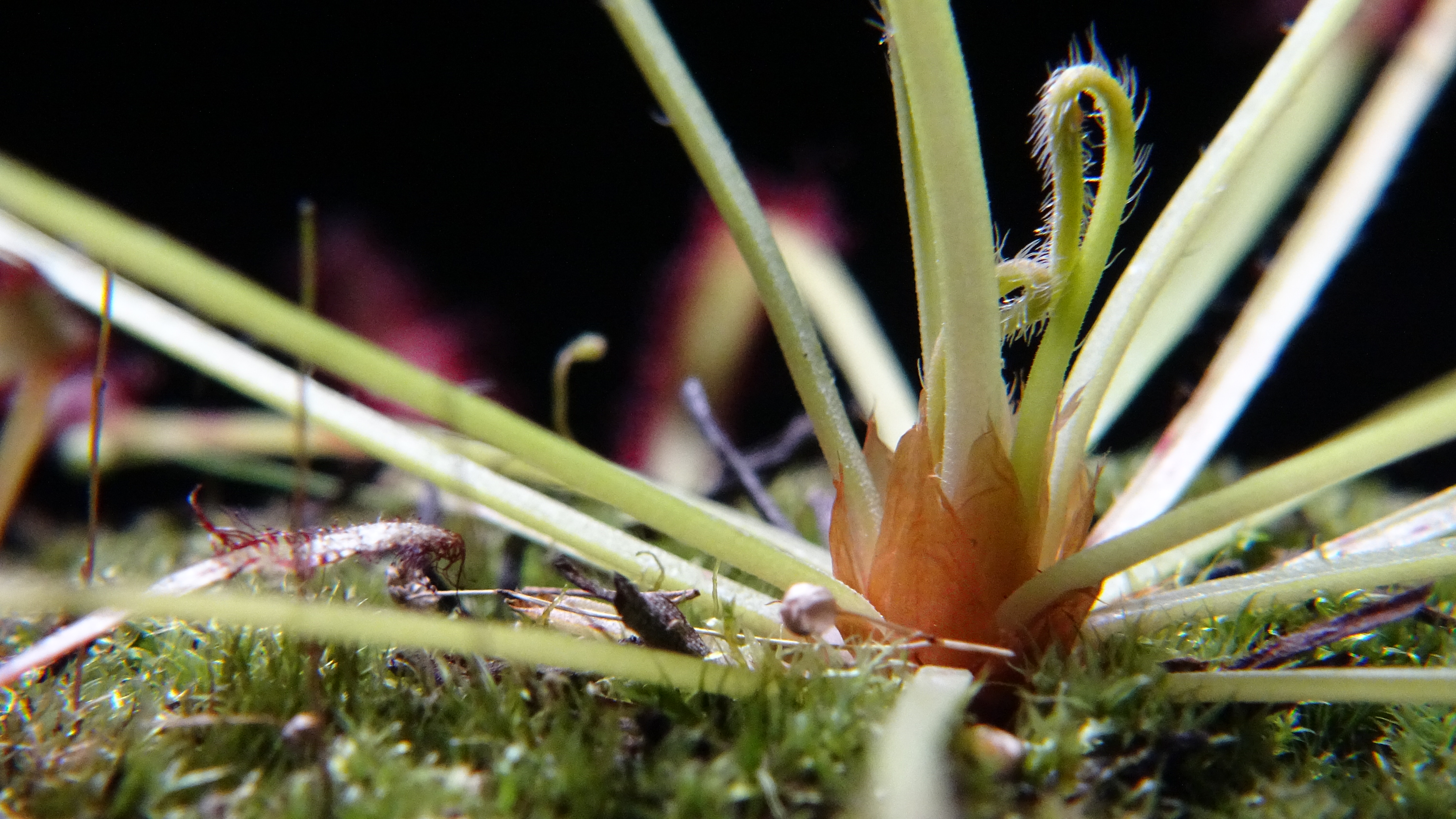
Brown, triangular stipules at the leaf base in D. capensis

D. capensis has conspicuous stipules at the leaf bases; these are brown and roughly triangular, membranous, with the apex intact or slightly divided into setae, 6–8 mm (0.24–0.31 in) long and 4–5 mm (0.16–0.20 in) wide. (Note: "Stipulae membranaceae, ovatae, concavae, apice in setas nonnullas solutae, ceterum integrae vel subintegrae, 6 — 8 mm longae, 4 — 5 mm latae")

Drosera species exhibit numerous different types of glandular trichomes (hairs). In addition to the large "tentacles" involved in prey capture, leaves of D. capensis have two types of microscopic glandular trichomes: Type 3 trichomes (short, unbranched, biseriate, stalk two- or three-celled, gland vertically divided) and Type 10 trichomes (unbranched short glandular hairs, stalk biseriate, gland multicellular).

==== Movement and prey capture ====
Time-lapse video of D. capensis leaf movement following prey capture

Like all sundews, D. capensis attracts, captures, and digests prey by means of stalked glandular trichomes (hairs or tentacles) that secrete droplets of sticky mucilage containing digestive enzymes. When a potential prey item contacts the marginal tentacles, they bend toward the centre of the leaf, bringing the prey item into contact with more tentacles. Adjacent marginal tentacles also move toward the prey, making prey escape more difficult and facilitating digestion.

D. capensis is among the sundew species in which the lamina itself also exhibits significant movement. When prey is detected, the leaf blade slowly bends inwards around the location of the prey, enfolding it. In D. capensis, the leaf can bend through more than 180°, "rolling" around the prey. The extent to which the leaf bends depends on the location of the prey; the closer the prey to the tip of the leaf, the more pronounced the bending response.

Experiments involving treatment of leaves of D. capensis with an auxin (indole-3-acetic acid) and an auxin transport inhibitor (2,3,5-triiodobenzoic acid) demonstrated that bending of the leaf is caused by a hormonal growth stimulus transported from the tip of the leaf to the bending point and induced by a signal originating at the location of the prey.

==== Mucilage ====
The mucilage produced by the glandular tentacles of D. capensis is an aqueous solution of about 4% of an acidic polysaccharide containing xylose, mannose, galactose, glucuronic acid, and ester sulphate in the ratio 1:6:6:6:1, with a pH of 5. It is viscous—about six times more viscous than water at 20 °C (68 °F)—and so sticky that when fresh, it can form threads up to 1 m (3.3 ft) long.

=== Flowers and seeds ===
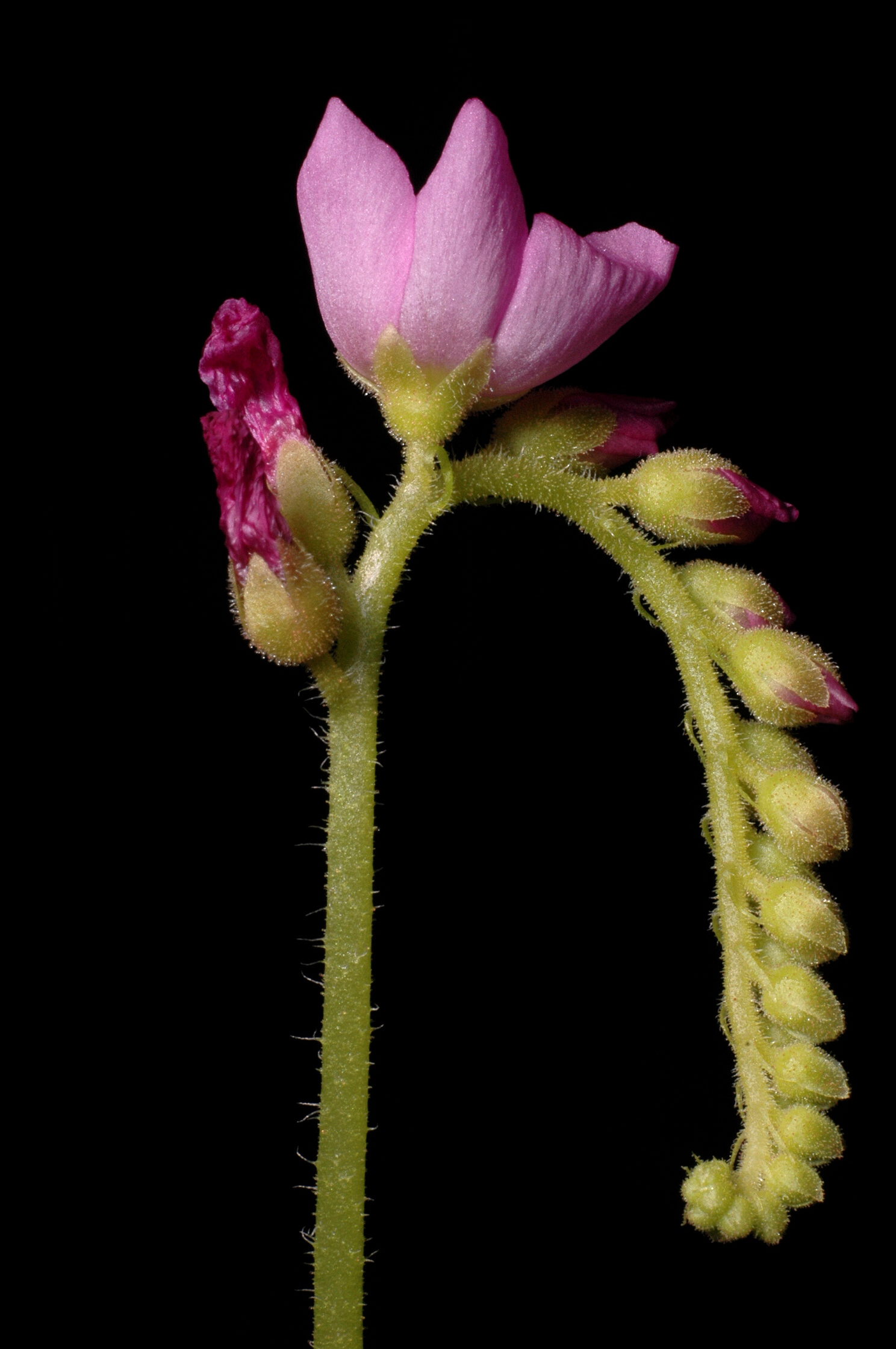
Inflorescence of D. capensis

The plant produces one, two, or occasionally three inflorescences, typically 15–25 cm (5.9–9.8 in) tall, but sometimes only 10 cm (3.9 in) or up to 35 cm (14 in). The scape, pedicels, and abaxial surface of the sepals have a moderate covering of coarse, translucent white, spreading hairs.

Each inflorescence bears numerous flowers, usually 15–30+ but occasionally as few as 6. The five-petalled flowers are arranged along one side of the peduncle and open sequentially, starting at the base. The pedicels are semi-erect and 3–6 mm (0.12–0.24 in) long. Sepals are obovate, 3–5 mm (0.12–0.20 in) long and 1.5–2 mm (0.059–0.079 in) wide, and usually green. Petals are also obovate, 8–15 mm (0.31–0.59 in) long and 5–12 mm (0.20–0.47 in) wide and typically pale purple, sometimes with a darker purple base. Forms with dark purple or white petals also exist.

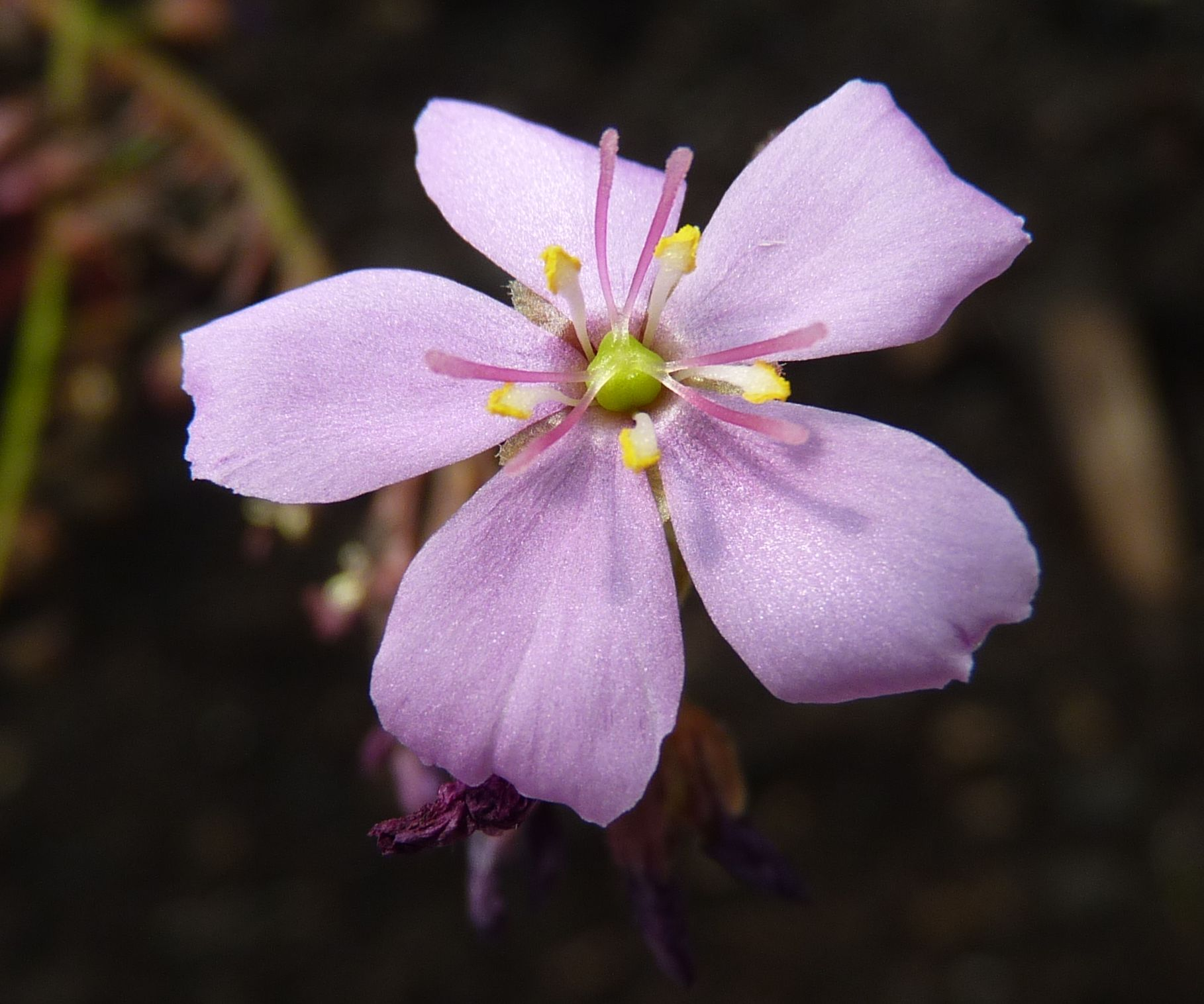
Fully open flower of D. capensis

The five stamens are 3–4 millimetres (0.12–0.16 in) long with a pink filament and yellow anthers and pollen. The apex of the filament is expanded between the anthers. The ovary is green, obovoid, 2 mm (0.079 in) long, and 1.5–2 mm (0.059–0.079 in) in diameter. The three purple styles are 4–8 mm (0.16–0.31 in) long, forked at the base and lie subhorizontal, expanding into stigmata that are cylindrical to irregularly obovate.

The flowers are self-fertile and autogamous (self-pollinating). Copious seeds are produced in dehiscent capsules, ripening 4–5 weeks after pollination. The seeds are dark brown, shiny, and cylindrical with tapered ends, approximately 0.7–1.0 mm (0.028–0.039 in) long and 0.1–0.2 mm (0.0039–0.0079 in) in diameter. The testa is deeply ridged longitudinally, with slightly shallower transverse ridges forming a net-patterned (reticulated) surface.

=== Biochemistry ===
Sundews produce a range of bioactive compounds, including naphthoquinones, flavonoids and their glycosides, and other secondary metabolites. D. capensis contains the naphthoquinone ramentaceone (7-methyljuglone) and trace amounts of plumbagin (its isomer). These compounds have antifeedant, allelopathic, and antimicrobial properties and are believed to play a defensive role in plants. They are also of interest for their potential medical uses, including antibacterial and anticancer applications.

D. capensis contains the flavonoids myricetin and quercetin, which are also of pharmacological interest. The species has been the subject of studies aiming to increase the biosynthesis of its naphthoquinones and flavonoids by applying elicitors including jasmonates and Agrobacterium rhizogenes, and in cell culture by inducing callus formation.

=== Genetics ===
D. capensis is a tetraploid species with a chromosome number of 2n=40.

The red-leaved form of the species was the first sundew—and the first carnivorous plant from order Caryophyllales, which also includes Nepenthes, Aldrovanda, Drosophyllum and Dionaea—to undergo whole-genome sequencing. The genome spans a total of 264 Mbp.

== Distribution and habitat ==
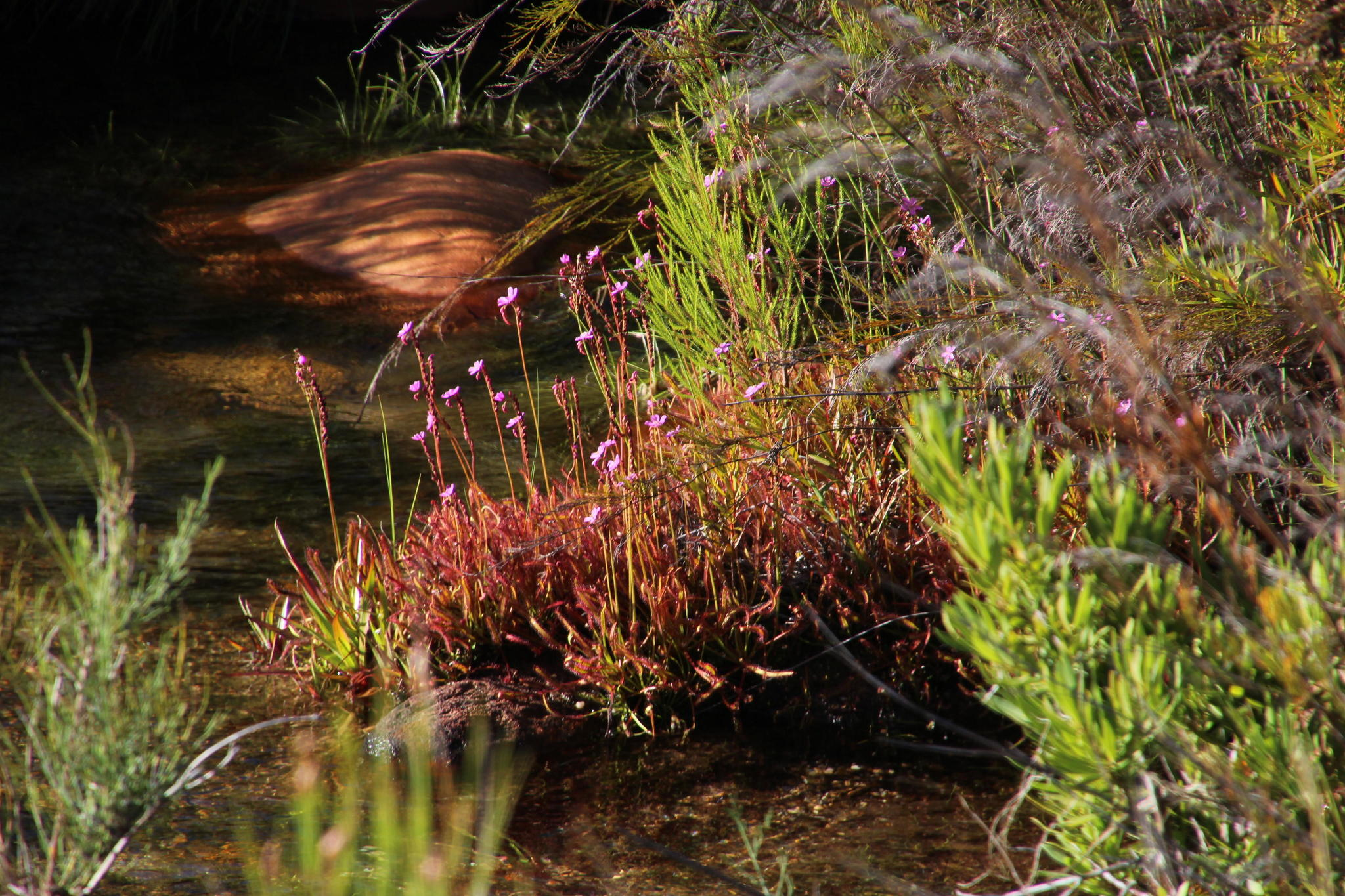
A stand of Drosera capensis growing alongside the Kromme River, Cederberg, South Africa

The native range of D. capensis spans the full width of the south coast of the Western Cape province, extending north from Cape Town to Gifberg and eastward into the Eastern Cape as far as Port Elizabeth. It has been reported from Brandfontein near Bredasdorp; Elim; Houwhoek; Ceres; near the N7 road between Clanwilliam and Citrusdal; the Verlorenvlei River; Hermanus; Paarl; Table Mountain National Park; Diep River near Plumstead; Riversdale including the Korinte River; Franschhoek; Jonkershoek; Viljoenspas; the Tradouw Pass; Tulbagh Kloof; Theewaterskloof; and Bainskloof.

It is found at elevations from 0–1,800 m (0–5,900 ft) in permanently wet habitats such as seeps, the edges of creeks and coastal wetlands, and in sheltered locations such as cliff bases. The plant grows in peaty or sandy soils, on moss-covered rocks, in quartzite rubble or in Sphagnum moss beds. At seepage sites it may grow on near-vertical rock faces. Despite its reputation as a weed in cultivation, D. capensis is often uncommon or localised in its native habitat, although it may become locally numerous where competing vegetation is suppressed, such as following a fire.

== Taxonomy ==
=== Botanical history ===
==== Pre-Linnaean ====
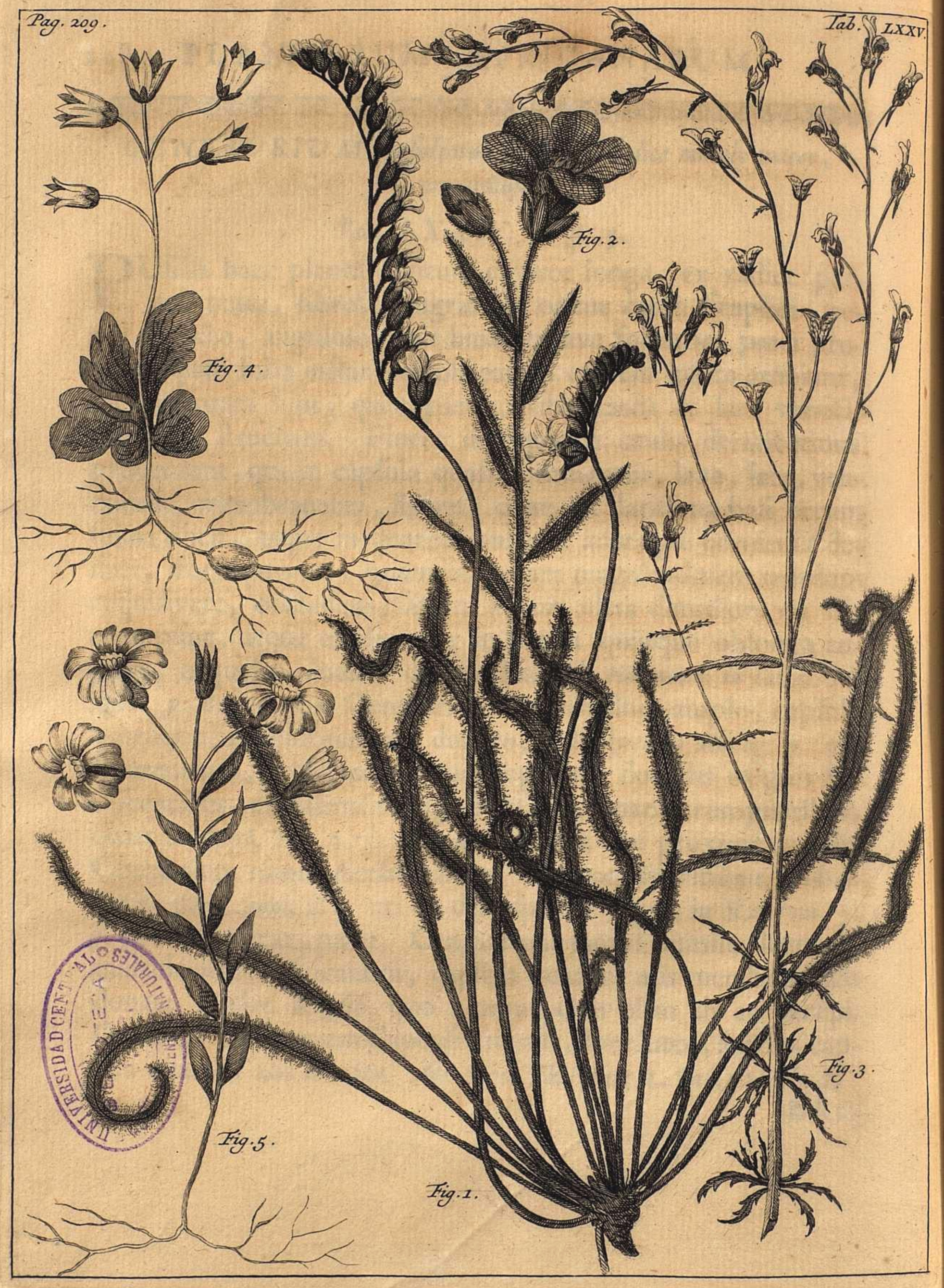
Drosera capensis illustrated in Burman's Rariorum Africanarum Plantarum, 1739

D. capensis was first introduced to Western botany around the end of the 17th century. Paul Hermann became one of the first botanists to collect herbarium specimens of plants from the Cape of Good Hope during his voyage to Ceylon in April 1672, but his plan for a detailed publication on African plants was not fulfilled prior to his death in 1695 and his collection later became fragmented. A catalogue of plants observed by Hermann at the Cape was published in 1737, as an appendix to Johannes Burman's Thesaurus Zeylanicus. (Note: Entitled Catalogus plantarum Africanum, quas Paulus Hermannus Botanices Professor, ad Caput Bonae Spei olim observavit (Catalogue of African plants, which Paul Hermann, Professor of Botany, once observed at the Cape of Good Hope)) A plant that could be D. capensis (Note: Cited as such by Carl Linnaeus in his description in Species Plantarum, 1753.) is listed among the four types of Ros Solis (sundew) in this work, described as Ros Solis Africanus, folio lato, & longo (African sundew, broad and long leaf). Sources disagree as to whether all the listed plants were actually collected by Hermann, or merely observed.

The third volume of John Ray's Historia Plantarum, published in 1704, included descriptions of three African Ros Solis, which were attributed to William Sherard. Among these is Ros Solis Africanus, foliis praelongis, caule nudo altissimo (African sundew, very long leaves, very tall bare stem). (Note: Sherard was a friend of Hermann from the early 1680s and received specimens from him, including some from the Cape; he also assisted in the posthumous publication of Hermann's work.)

A detailed engraving and description of D. capensis was given in Burman's 1739 Rariorum Africanarum Plantarum (Decas Octava) under the phrase name "Drosera foliis ad radicem longissimis, floribus spicatis". Burman stated that he obtained the specimen from Laurent Garcin in whose collection it was described as "Ros Solis Capensis, foliis longissimis, circinnatis, floribus purpureis, spicatis". (Note: "a Dom. Garcin haec cum subsequente ex ejus Herbario mecum est communicata, quae ipsi vocatur Ros Solis Capensis foliis longissimis, circinnatis, floribus purpureis, spicatis.") The specimen from which Burman's image was engraved (the typotype) is held in the herbarium of the Geneva Botanical Garden, with the collector listed as Pieter Hertog.

==== Linnaeus and later 18th century ====
D. capensis was one of the five species of Drosera included in Carl Linnaeus' 1753 Species Plantarum, where he gave the short description "DROSERA scapis radicatis, foliis lanceolatis" and the origin "habitat in Aethiopia". Linnaeus cited as synonymous with D. capensis, the three earlier descriptions noted above.

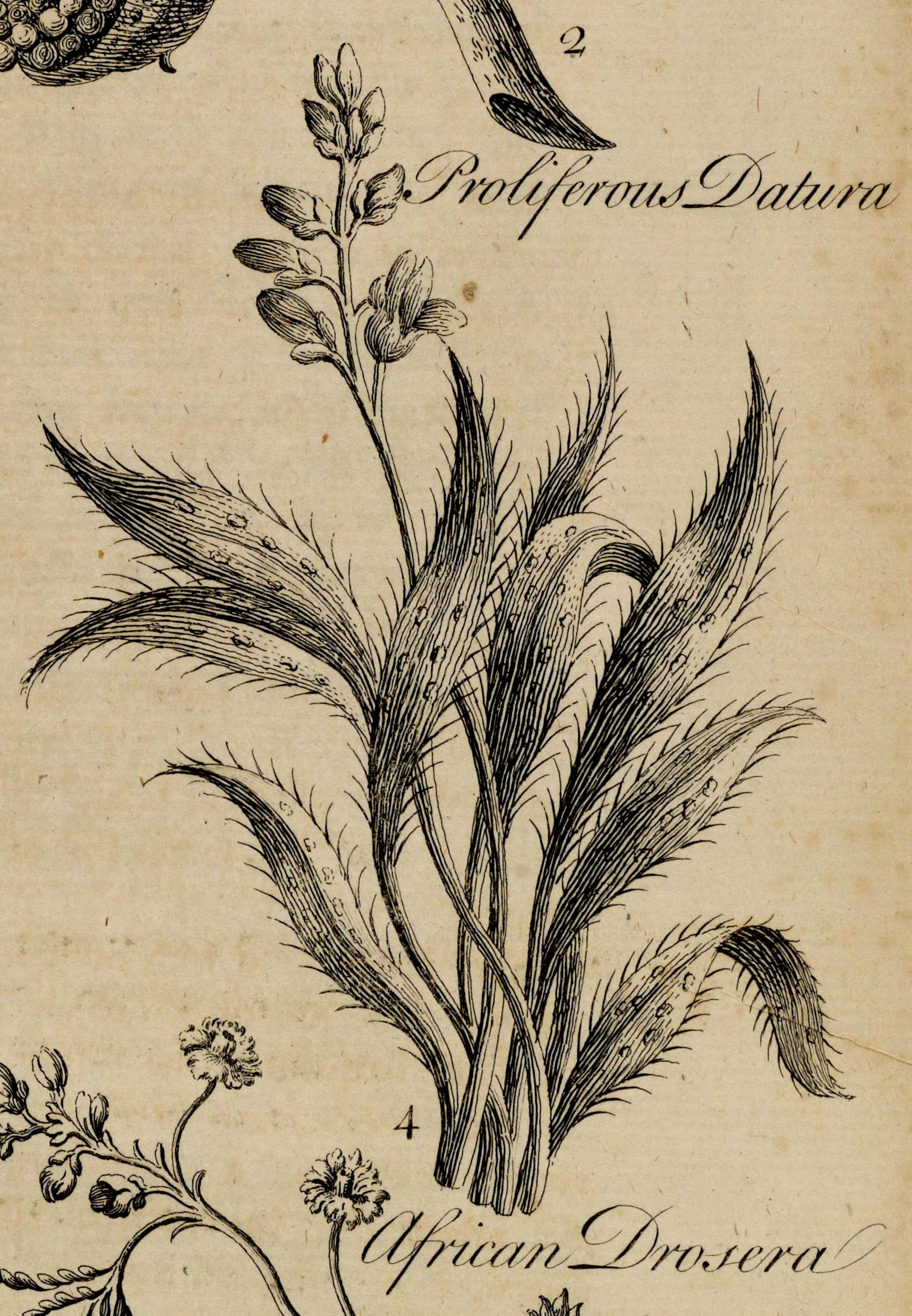
'African Drosera' (Drosera capensis) illustration from Plate 25 of Eden, or a compleat body of gardening, 1757

In 1757, John Hill gave a lengthy description of the species in English in the illustrated work Eden, or a compleat body of gardening. Hill did not use Linnaeus' binomial name, giving only the title "African Drosera", but the introduction makes clear which species is referred to:

We propose here to the Curious a little Plant, singular in its Kind for a Garden Ornament; and though a Native of the warmest Parts of Africa, capable of bearing unhurt our Climate in a full Exposure.

Most who have treated of the African Plants have named it. Herman calls it, Ros solis folio lato : and Ray, Ros solis foliis praelongis.—Linnaeus, who has adopted for the Genus the Name Drosera, adds as the Distinction of this Species, foliis lanceolatis, scapis radicatis : Lanceolate leav'd Drosera, with the Flower-stalk naked from the Root.

It is not unlike in the general Form to the Sundews of Europe; but larger, and more conspicuous than them all; and of a finer Colour.

Hill included cultivation details, noting that "Mr. Sherrard from Seeds pick out of the Heads of Specimens, of the Plant from the Cape, raised several promising Roots upon a Bog" and that the plant could be grown alongside Sarracenia.

The engraving (Note: This is signed 'B. Cole sculp.', possibly Benjamin Cole) in Hill's work of D. capensis—which was later described by Peter Jonas Bergius as mala ('bad')—appears alongside another carnivorous plant, Nepenthes. There is no indication that Hill was aware of this shared characteristic, and he surmises (incorrectly) that both plants' fluid secretions serve to "discharge redundant Moisture".

D. capensis is the only Drosera species listed in the short dissertation Flora capensis defended by Linnaeus' pupil Carl Wänman in 1759; it was also the only Drosera included in Bergius' 1767 Descriptiones plantarum ex Capite Bonae Spei.

Another of Linnaeus' students, Carl Thunberg, spent three years at the Cape between April 1772 and March 1775. Thunberg carried out botanical exploration of the area while also learning Dutch as preparation for onward travel to Japan, which under the Sakoku isolationist policy of the Edo period was only open to the Dutch. D. capensis appeared in two works published by Thunberg at the end of the 18th century. In Prodromus plantarum Capensium it is listed among four species of Drosera collected by Thunberg at the Cape between 1772 and 1775, with the short description D. caule erecto bifido, foliis lanceolatis (D. erect, bifurcated stem; lanceolate leaves). In 1797 Thunberg published Dissertatio botanica de Drosera (defended by his student Daniel Haij) which gave a structured treatment of the ten species then included within genus Drosera. (Note: This includes D. lusitanica which is now placed in the monotypic genus Drosophyllum and D. roridula which is now Roridula) Section 5 of this work (Characteres specierum) provided an infrageneric arrangement of Drosera based on characteristics of the inflorescence, in which D. capensis was placed within the group Scapigerae (scape-bearing) along with D. cuneifolia, D. rotundifolia and D. longifolia. The distribution was given as "rarer in the mountains". (Note: "In Capitae Bonae Spei Africes ... in montibus rarior")

==== 19th century ====
Thunberg's 1823 Flora capensis included Drosera capensis among five species of South African Drosera, giving details of the flowering period (September to November).

In 1824, Augustin Pyramus de Candolle provided the first systematic revision of genus Drosera in his Prodromus systematis naturalis regni vegetabilis, with an infrageneric classification of 32 species into two sections, each having two series. De Candolle placed D. capensis in sect. Rorella ser. Acaules, foliis radicalibus saepius rosulatis (Stemless, with radical leaves often rosulate).

In 1848, Jules Emile Planchon published a new treatment of Drosera in the Annales des sciences naturelles. Botanique. This covered 88 species arranged into 13 sections based on morphological characteristics, including style division. D. capensis was placed in section Rossolis, which was characterised by a hypogynous flower with five stamens; three styles, bifurcated from the base, with a club-shaped, undivided or bi-lobed apex of the stigma; and three pluriovate placentas.

Otto Wilhelm Sonder provided a botanical description of the species in English in the 1859 Flora capensis produced with William Henry Harvey. This included more specific location details—"Wet places, in subalpine situations, near Capetown: Dutoit's-kloof; Paarlberg, and Tulbagh &c."

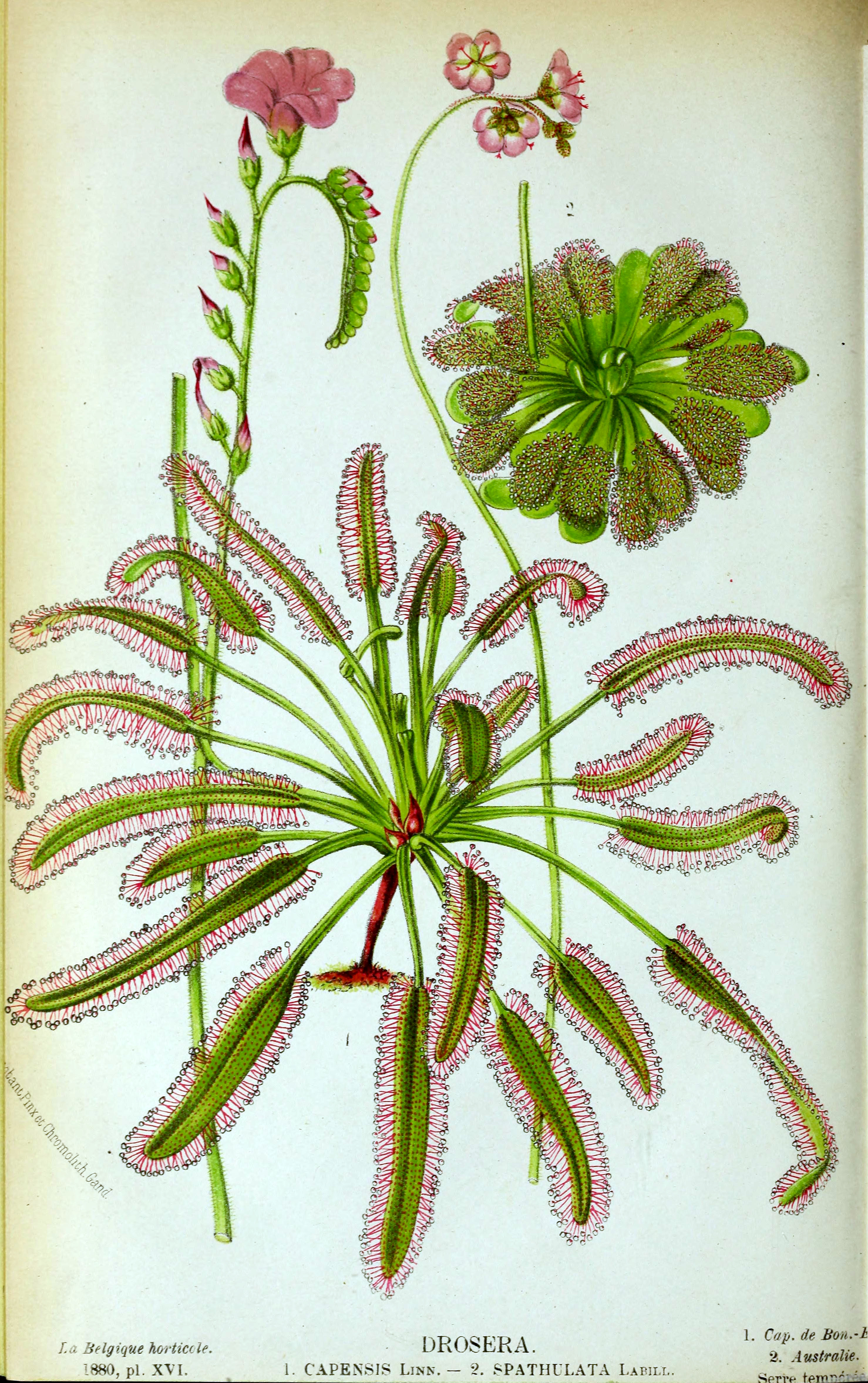
Drosera capensis and Drosera spatulata illustrated in La Belgique Horticole, 1880

Messrs. Veitch presented the plant to the Royal Botanic Society in London on 22 April 1874, and also introduced it to the Royal Botanic Gardens, Kew. It was noted among interesting plants reported in 1875 in La Belgique Horticole:

A cold greenhouse plant, of a curious and interesting structure, with long-petioled, linear-oblong, obtuse leaves, and covered with glandular hairs. (Note: "Plante de serre froide, d'une curieuse et intéressante structure, à feuilles longuement pétiolées, linéaires-oblongues, obtuses, et couvertes de poils glanduleux.")

In 1880, the same journal published an illustrated note on D. capensis and D. spatulata by Édouard Morren, recommending these Drosera species as "among the most interesting and easiest to cultivate". (Note: "on peut recommander le Drosera capensis et le Drosera spathulata, parmi les plus intéressants et les plus faciles") The note provided detailed cultivation information, including observations that the plants require pure water and are calcifuges. (Note: "Ils veulent de l'eau fraiche et pure, un sol tourbeux et fangeux, ils ne souffrent pas le calcaire, c'est-à-dire qu'ils sont calcifuges, selon l'expression de M. Contejean") The illustrations were based on plants grown in greenhouses where they had "thrived for several years, multiplying, and flowering regularly". (Note: "Ces deux plantes sont représentées ici, avec leurs fleurs, d'après des spécimens cultivés dans nos serres particulières où elles prospèrent depuis plusieurs années, multiplient et fleurissent régulièrement.") Morren described cultivation of the plants in the coolest part of a hothouse, where they were watered via drops of condensation from the roof. (Note: "Nous cultivons avec succès les Drosera capensis et spathulala dans la serre chaude, mais à l'extrémité inférieure de la toiture, près des vitres, dans une situation où la température n'est que tempérée. Chaque pot est placé sur une petite étagère, immédiatement sous le bout d'une verne, de manière à recevoir constamment et goutte à goutte l'eau qui s'écoule de la toiture : l'eau se renouvelle sans cesse : elle est très pure, puisqu'elle vient en quelque sorte d'être distillée et ne renferme pas traces de chaux : en outre, elle est fraîche et aérée.")

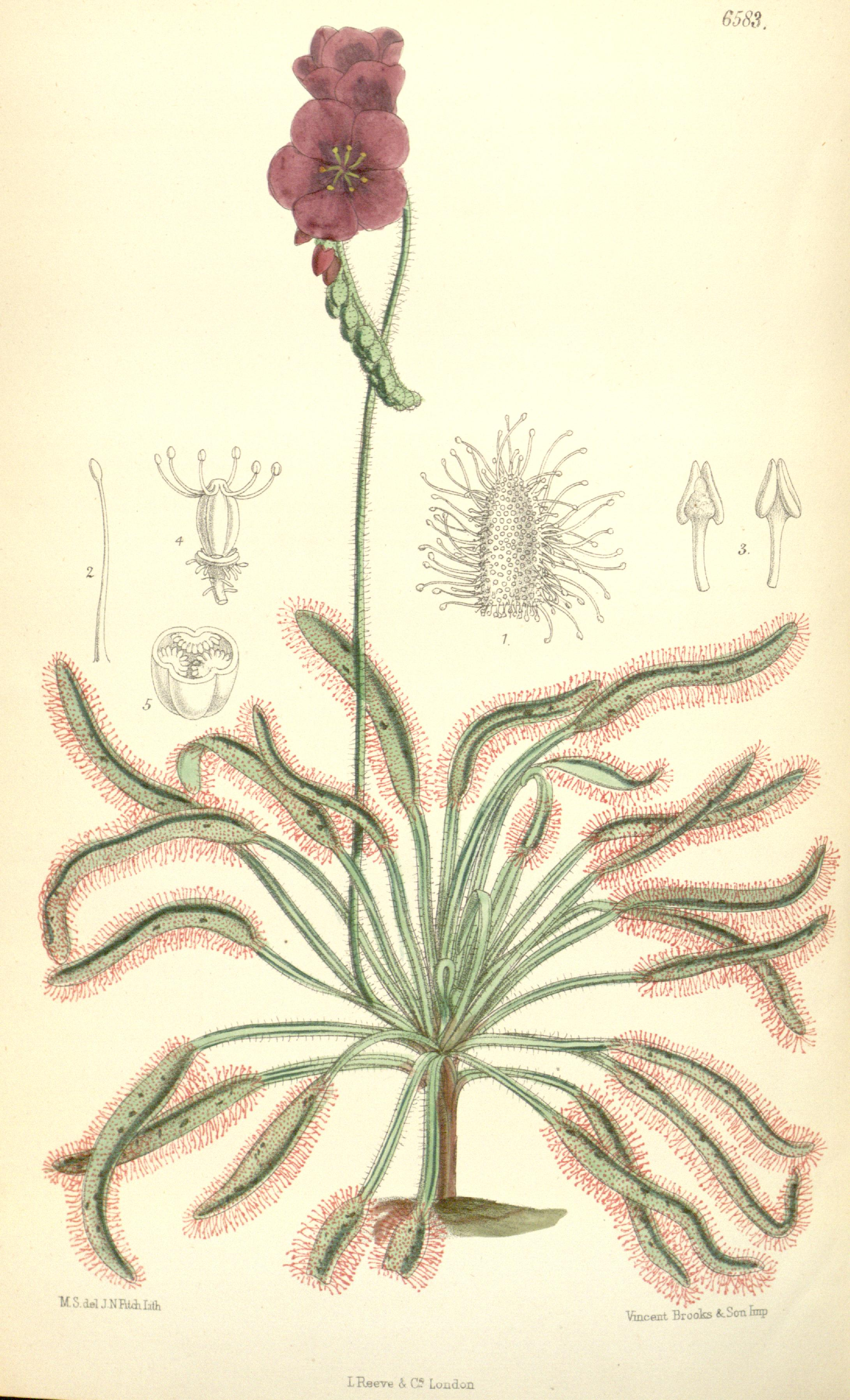
Colour illustration of Drosera capensis from Curtis's Botanical Magazine, 1881

The plant was illustrated by Matilda Smith in Curtis's Botanical Magazine in 1881, along with a description by Joseph Dalton Hooker noting that it had flowered in July in a cool greenhouse at Kew.

In Carl Georg Oscar Drude's 1888 treatment of Droseraceae, D. capensis was given as one of the example species within subg. Ros-solis section Vagae.

==== 20th century ====
In 1906, the first true monograph of Droseraceae was published in Das Pflanzenreich by German botanist and collector Ludwig Diels. Diels built on Planchon's earlier infrageneric classification and placed D. capensis within subg. Rorella, section Rossolis, series Eurossolis. Diels' monograph was still considered the standard reference for Drosera anatomy and morphology more than a century later. It included detailed commentary and illustrations on germination in D. capensis.

=== Infrageneric classification ===
Since 2019, D. capensis has been placed within Drosera sect. Ptycnostigma, under the expanded definition established by Fleischmann et al. based on phylogenetic data. This section contains all African sundews except D. regia and D. indica.

== Cultivation ==
D. capensis is one of the most widely cultivated sundews. It is a relatively large, 'showy' species whose leaves exhibit dramatic movement in response to prey capture. It is easily propagated, grows rapidly, readily produces attractive flowers, and is considered very easy to grow.

=== Growing conditions ===
The plant requires warm-temperate conditions and is often grown as a houseplant (on a windowsill or in a terrarium), in a greenhouse, or outside in areas with suitable climate. It can withstand infrequent, short-term exposure to temperatures below freezing; the plant may die back above ground, and re-grow from the roots when warmth returns. It prefers full sun but will tolerate partial shade, and requires permanently moist or wet conditions so is typically grown in a saucer or tray of rainwater. Growing media is often peat-based—for example a mixture of peat and sand or perlite—or live Sphagnum moss.

=== Propagation ===
==== Sexual ====
D. capensis is readily propagated by seed. The plant is self-fertile and produces hundreds of tiny seeds, which germinate readily on a moist substrate. In favourable growing conditions seedlings can grow to flowering maturity in a single year.

==== Asexual ====
The species can be propagated vegetatively via leaf or root cuttings. Whole leaves can be placed on a moist substrate and will develop plantlets as the original leaf dies; alternatively the entire above-surface part of the plant can be removed and replanted, and will often develop new roots, while the original roots form a new growing point. Short (1.5–3 cm) sections of root from a healthy plant can be taken as cuttings and replanted, forming new buds in 2–6 weeks.

=== Pests ===
The species has few pests in cultivation, but can be affected by caterpillars and by aphids, which attack the flower stalks.

=== Cultivars and hybrids ===
The following cultivars of Drosera capensis are listed by the International Carnivorous Plant Society, which is the International Cultivar Registration Authority for carnivorous plants:

Cultivars of Drosera capensis
Cultivar	Description
Drosera 'Albino' Hort. Borret & Farrow	White flowers, lack of red colouration in the leaves and tentacles
Drosera 'Narrow Leaf' Hort. D'Amato	Similar to "typical form" but with narrow lamina and petiole, and more compact, rarely producing a tall stem

Drosera 'Albino' and Drosera 'Narrow Leaf' have both received the Award of Garden Merit from the Royal Horticultural Society.

The following Drosera hybrid cultivars with D. capensis involvement are listed by the ICPS:

Hybrid cultivars involving Drosera capensis
Cultivar	Parentage	Description
Drosera 'Anemone' Hort. H.Carlton	D. oblanceolata × spatulata × capensis	Stout rosetted plant with elongate leaves intermediate between 'paddle-shaped' and 'strap-shaped'; very tall inflorescence with pale pink flowers
Drosera 'Hercules' Hort. C.Trexler	D. capensis × aliciae	Similar in habit to D. capensis but with strikingly broadened leaves that barely reflex, and a tendency to form clumps

== Conservation status ==
As of June 2025, Drosera capensis does not have an assessment on the IUCN Red List. On the South African National Biodiversity Institute's Red List of South African Plants it is listed as 'Least Concern', a categorisation applied automatically because it was not highlighted in screening processes used to select taxa of potential conservation concern for detailed assessment. In 2020, as part of a large-scale conservation status assessment of carnivorous plants, it was assessed using IUCN criteria as 'Least Concern'.

== Invasive species ==
Drosera capensis has been deliberately introduced to wetland habitat in numerous countries outside its native range, including New Zealand, the United States, Japan, Australia, Brazil and the Azores. Many of these locations are ecologically sensitive, and introduced species such as D. capensis may compete with threatened local flora.

In New Zealand, D. capensis is listed on the National Pest Plant Accord register meaning that it is prohibited from sale or commercial propagation under the Biosecurity Act 1993. It has become established in the Waitākere Ranges, either due to deliberate planting or via soil contamination from other introduced plants. Its seeds are believed to be distributed by waterfowl. The species is subject to 'sustained control' under the Conservation Auckland Regional Pest Management Plan.

In Mendocino County California, Albion Bog—a raised bog in rare dwarf forest habitat—has become infested with non-native carnivorous plants as a result of deliberate plantings by enthusiasts from the 1960s onwards. Drosera capensis has formed dense stands, outcompeting the native sundew D. rotundifolia, and conservationists have found it impossible to eradicate.

In Australia, D. capensis was reported as naturalised at a single site in the Royal National Park, where at least 100 adult plants were observed.

In Hawaiʻi, although not known to be naturalised, it is assessed as a 'high risk' species by the Plant Pono initiative due to characteristics including its self-fertility; prolific seed production; capacity for hybridisation; rapid growth to maturity; tolerance of a wide range of growing conditions; and ability to regenerate after frost and fire damage.

The species is listed (with a 'low' risk rating) in A Global Compendium of Weeds.
