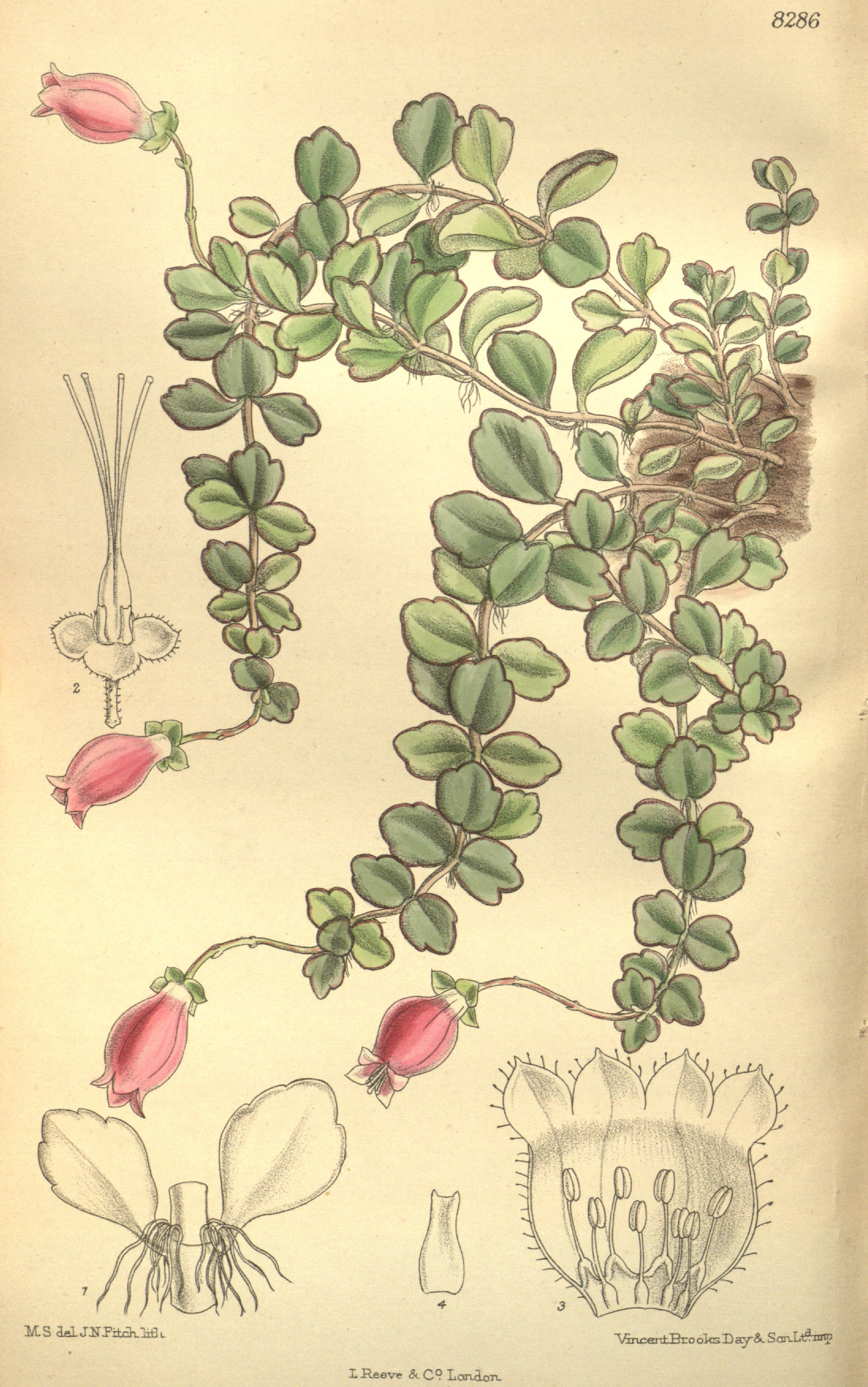
- Botanical illustration
- Close-up of leaves

Scientific classification
- Kingdom: Plantae
- Clade: Tracheophytes
- Clade: Angiosperms
- Clade: Eudicots
- Order: Saxifragales
- Family: Crassulaceae
- Genus: Kalanchoe
- Species: K. uniflora

Binomial name
- Kalanchoe uniflora (Stapf) Raym.-Hamet

Synonyms
- Bryophyllum ambrense (H.Perrier) A.Berger; Bryophyllum uniflorum (Stapf) A.Berger; Kalanchoe ambrensis H.Perrier; Kalanchoe uniflora var. brachycalyx Boiteau & Mannoni; Kitchingia uniflora Stapf

= Kalanchoe uniflora =

Species of plant

Kalanchoe uniflora, the coral berry or coral bell plant, is a species of flowering plant in the family Crassulaceae. It is native to northwestern Madagascar. A prostrate or pendant epiphyte, it is found growing on trees and ericoid shrubs at elevations from 1,000 to 2,000 m (3,300 to 6,600 ft). A succulent, it is valued for its striking pink to fuchsia flowers and recommended for hanging baskets.
