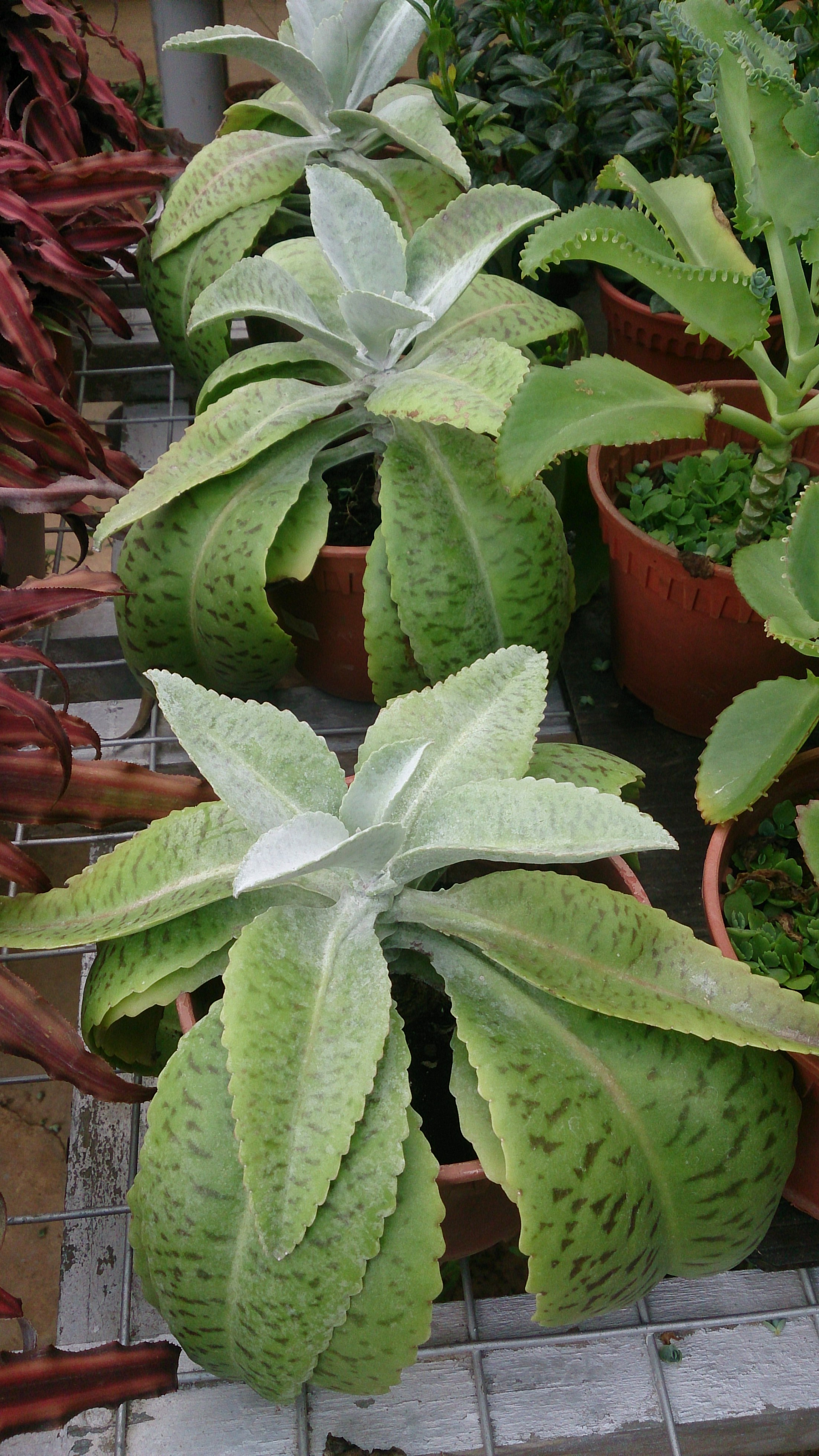

Scientific classification
- Kingdom: Plantae
- Clade: Tracheophytes
- Clade: Angiosperms
- Clade: Eudicots
- Order: Saxifragales
- Family: Crassulaceae
- Genus: Kalanchoe
- Species: K. gastonis-bonnieri

Binomial name
- Kalanchoe gastonis-bonnieri Raym.-Hamet & H.Perrier

= Kalanchoe gastonis-bonnieri =

Species of succulent

Kalanchoe gastonis-bonnieri is a species of flowering plant in the family Crassulaceae. They are called "palm beachbells" or "donkey ear plants" as they have leaves resembling the shape of a donkey's ear.

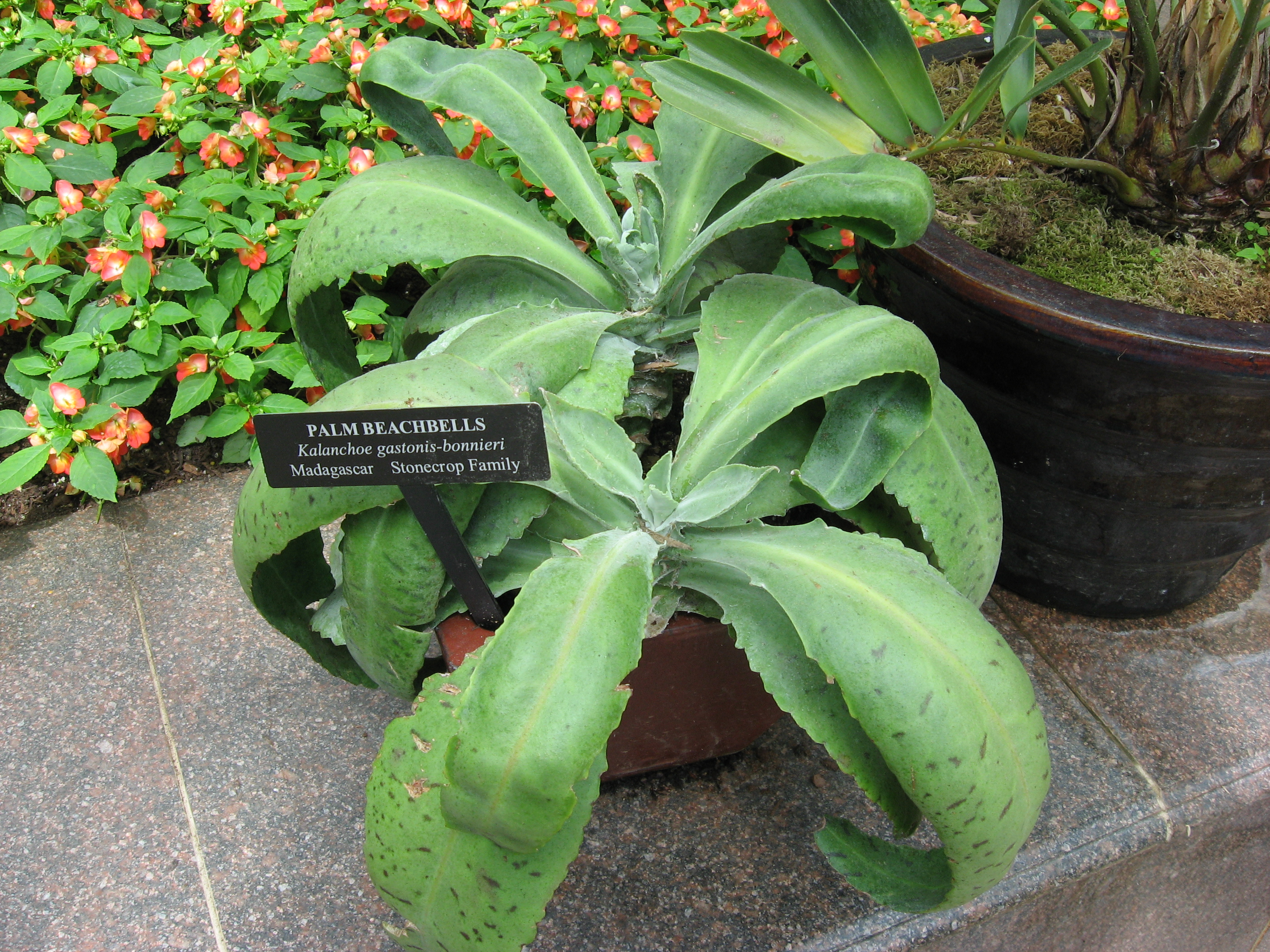
Palm Beachbells (Kalanchoe gastonis-bonnieri)

K. gastonis-bonnieri have thick green leaves more or less with brownish spots and often form plantlets at leaf tips. It may be confused with K. suarezensis and K. mortagei, whose leaves have no spots.
