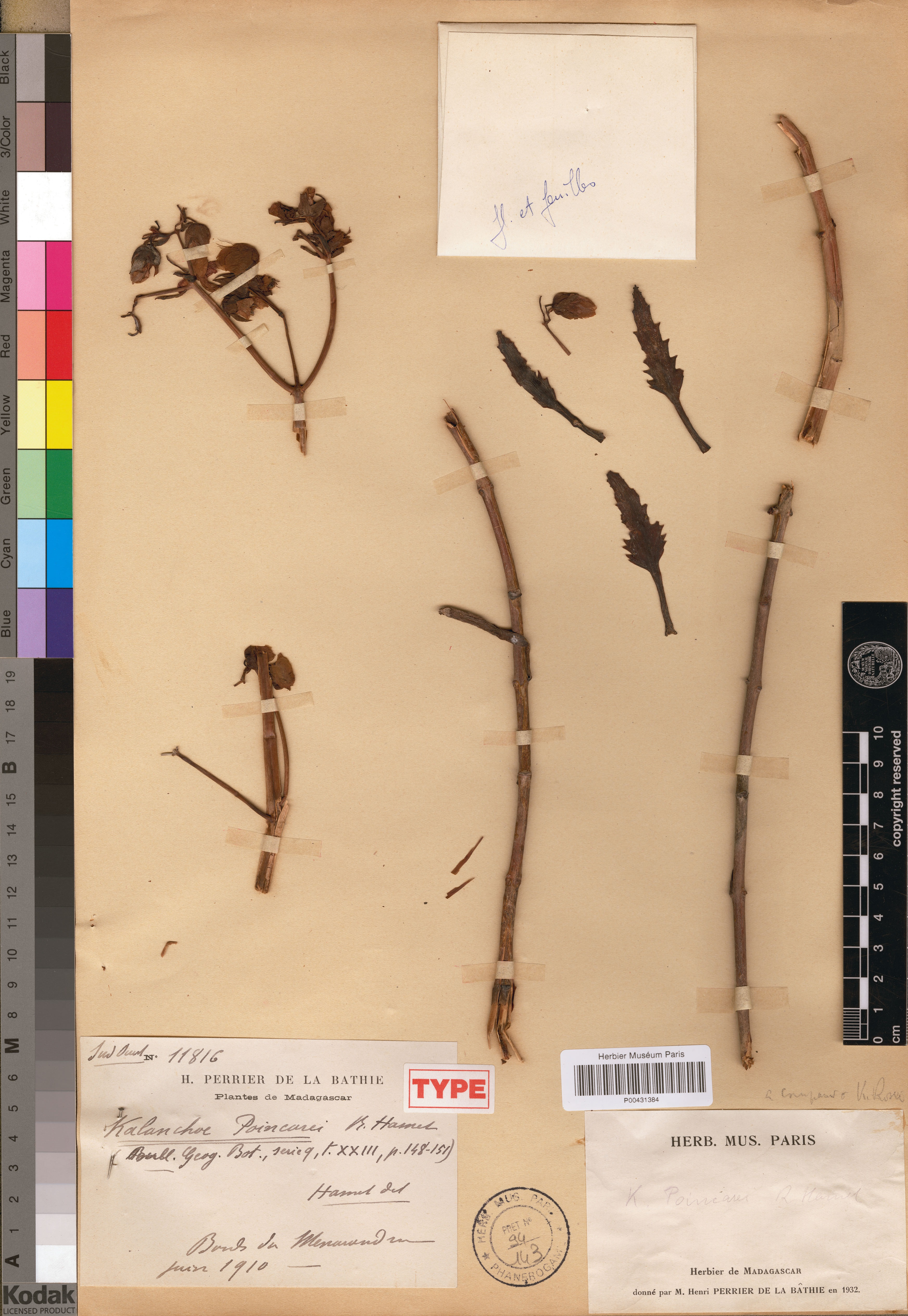
- Holotype of Kalanchoe poincarei

Scientific classification
- Kingdom: Plantae
- Clade: Tracheophytes
- Clade: Angiosperms
- Clade: Eudicots
- Order: Saxifragales
- Family: Crassulaceae
- Genus: Kalanchoe
- Species: K. × poincarei

Binomial name
- Kalanchoe × poincarei Raym.-Hamet & H.Perrier

Synonyms
- Bryophyllum poincarei (Raym.-Hamet & H.Perrier) Govaerts

= Kalanchoe × poincarei =

Species of succulent

Kalanchoe × poincarei is a species of Kalanchoe native to southern Madagascar. Its scientific name is often misapplied to K. suarezensis and K. mortagei, but K. × poincarei is very different from them. The true K. × poincarei is a natural hybrid involving K. beauverdii, with similar sprawling stems up to 3 m in length, and not known in cultivation, whereas K. suarezensis and K. mortagei are erect, 30~60 cm tall and cultivated as ornamentals.
