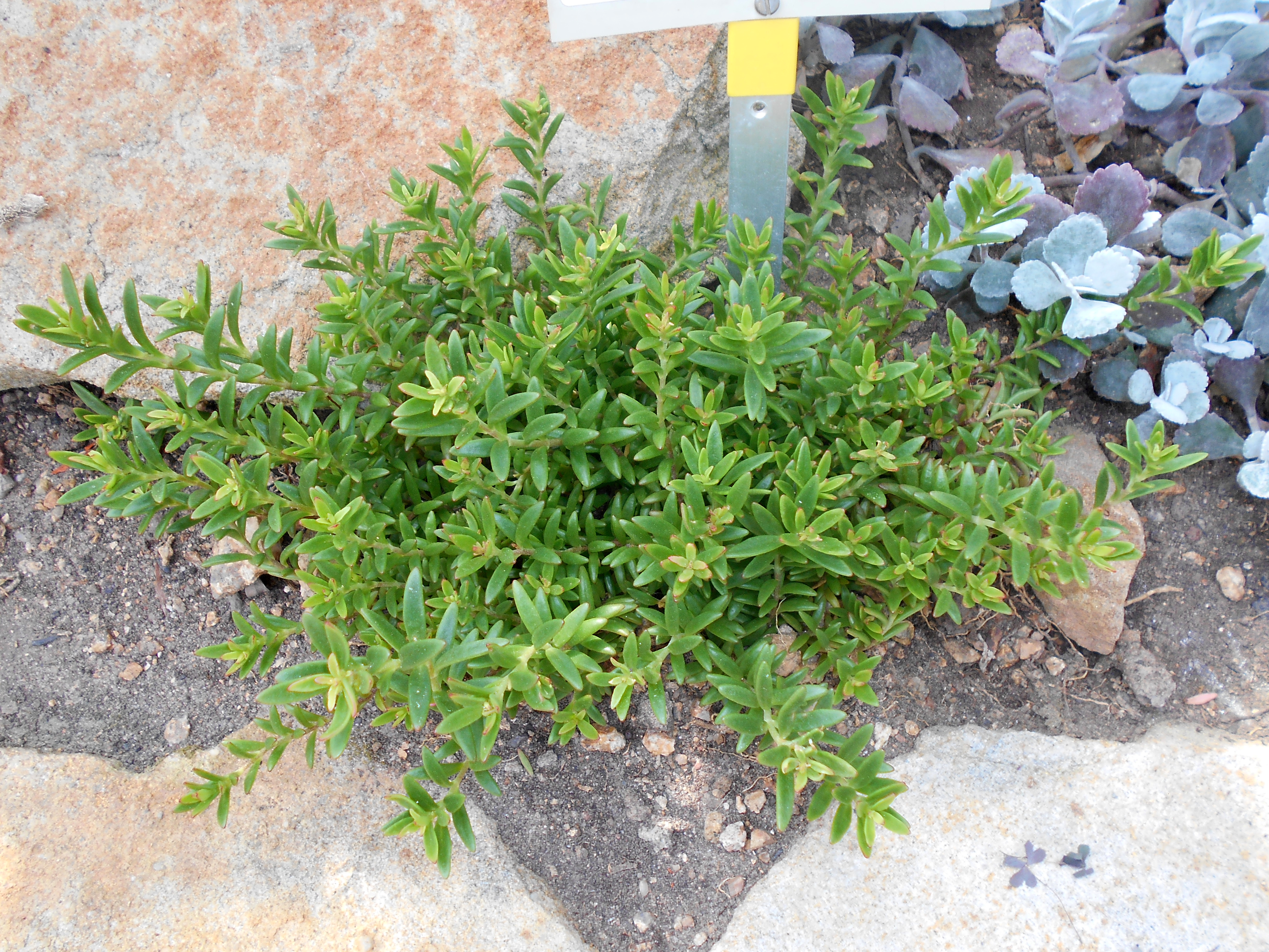

Scientific classification
- Kingdom: Plantae
- Clade: Embryophytes
- Clade: Tracheophytes
- Clade: Angiosperms
- Clade: Eudicots
- Order: Saxifragales
- Family: Crassulaceae
- Genus: Kalanchoe
- Species: K. jongmansii

Binomial name
- Kalanchoe jongmansii Raym.-Hamet & H.Perrier

Synonyms
- Bryophyllum jongmansii (Raym.-Hamet & H.Perrier); Kalanchoe jongmansii subsp. ivohibensis Humbert

= Kalanchoe jongmansii =

Species of flowering plant

Kalanchoe jongmansii is a species of flowering plant in the family Crassulaceae. It is a succulent native to Madagascar. The species was described in 1914.

== Taxonomy ==
The species was described by Raymond-Hamet and Joseph Marie Henry Alfred Perrier de la Bâthie in 1914. It was formerly known as Bryophyllum jongmansii.

== Distribution ==
Kalanchoe jongmansii is endemic to the seasonally dry tropical biome of Madagascar. It grows in the Andringitra Massif.

== Description ==
Kalanchoe jongmansii is a succulent subshrub or herb.
