= Kalanchoe mortagei =

Scientific classification
- Kingdom: Plantae
- Clade: Tracheophytes
- Clade: Angiosperms
- Clade: Eudicots
- Order: Saxifragales
- Family: Crassulaceae
- Genus: Kalanchoe
- Species: K. mortagei

Binomial name
- Kalanchoe mortagei Raym.-Hamet & H.Perrier

Synonyms
- Bryophyllum mortagei (Raym.-Hamet & H.Perrier) Wickens; Bryophyllum poincarei (Raym.-Hamet & H.Perrier) V.V.Byalt; Kalanchoe poincarei var. mortagei (Raym.-Hamet & H.Perrier) Boiteau

Species of succulent

Kalanchoe mortagei is a species of Kalanchoe (section Bryophyllum) native to northern Madagascar. It is very similar to K. suarezensis, and both of them used to be mistakenly treated as varieties of a totally different species K. poincarei. K. mortagei differs by having auriculate to peltate leaves, while the leaf base of K. suarezensis is attenuate to truncate.
