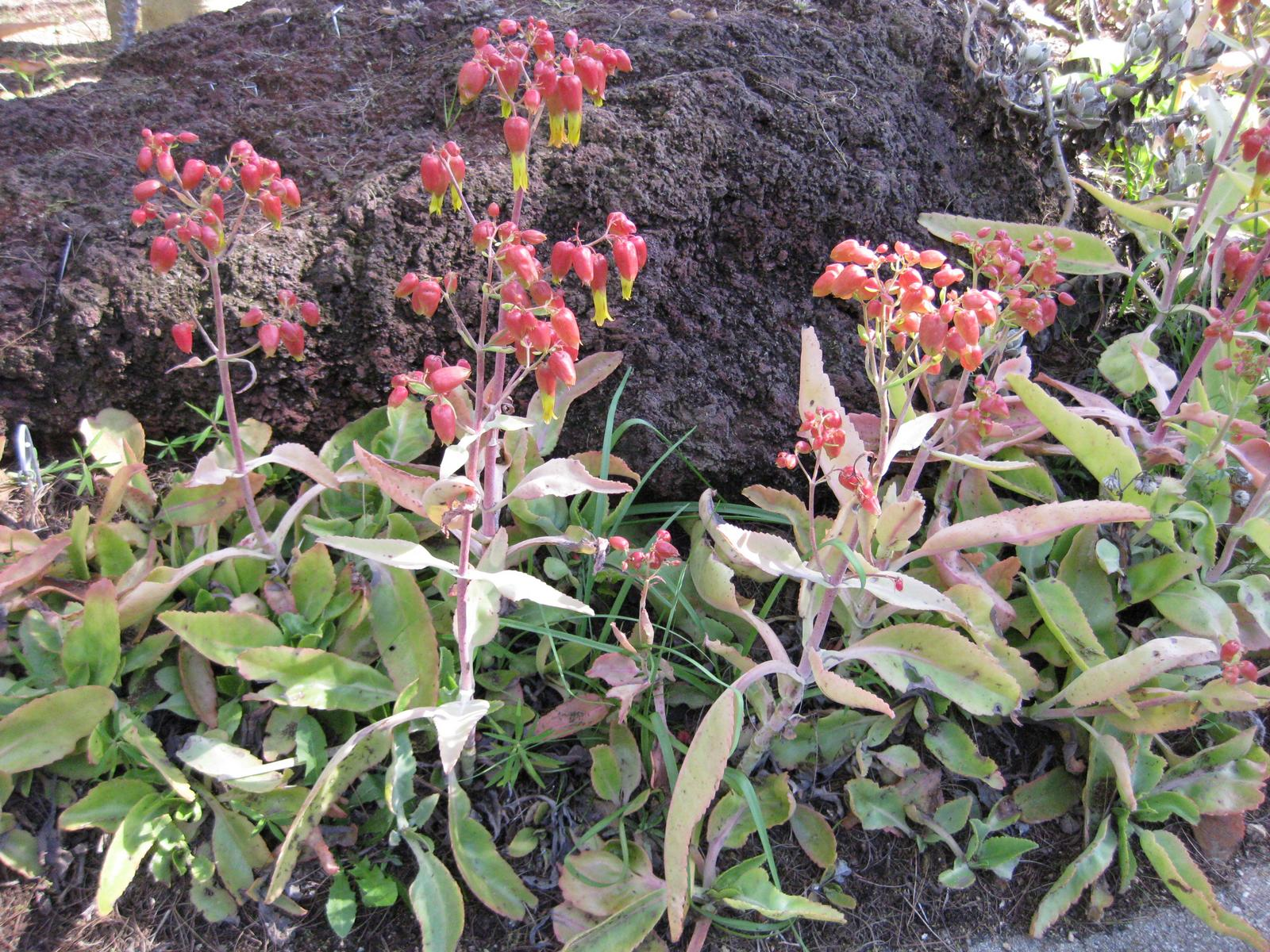

Scientific classification
- Kingdom: Plantae
- Clade: Tracheophytes
- Clade: Angiosperms
- Clade: Eudicots
- Order: Saxifragales
- Family: Crassulaceae
- Genus: Kalanchoe
- Species: K. suarezensis

Binomial name
- Kalanchoe suarezensis H.Perrier

Synonyms
- Bryophyllum suarezense (H.Perrier) A.Berger; Kalanchoe poincarei var. suarezensis (H.Perrier) L.Allorge

= Kalanchoe suarezensis =

Species of succulent

Kalanchoe suarezensis is a species of Kalanchoe (section Bryophyllum) native to northern Madagascar.

It is cultivated as an ornamental plant, but often misidentified as other species like K. gastonis-bonnieri, K. mortagei and K. poincarei. K. gastonis-bonnieri differs by more or less having brownish spots on leaves, while the leaves of K. suarezensis are spotless. K. mortagei differs by having auriculate to peltate leaves, while the leaf base of K. suarezensis is attenuate to truncate. K. poincarei is a sprawling species not known in cultivation, very different from all the species mentioned above.

Another species that may be confused with K. suarezensis is K. laetivirens. Both species have spotless leaves, but K. suarezensis have plantlets usually near the leaf tip, while K. laetivirens have plantlets all along the leaf margin.

== Gallery ==
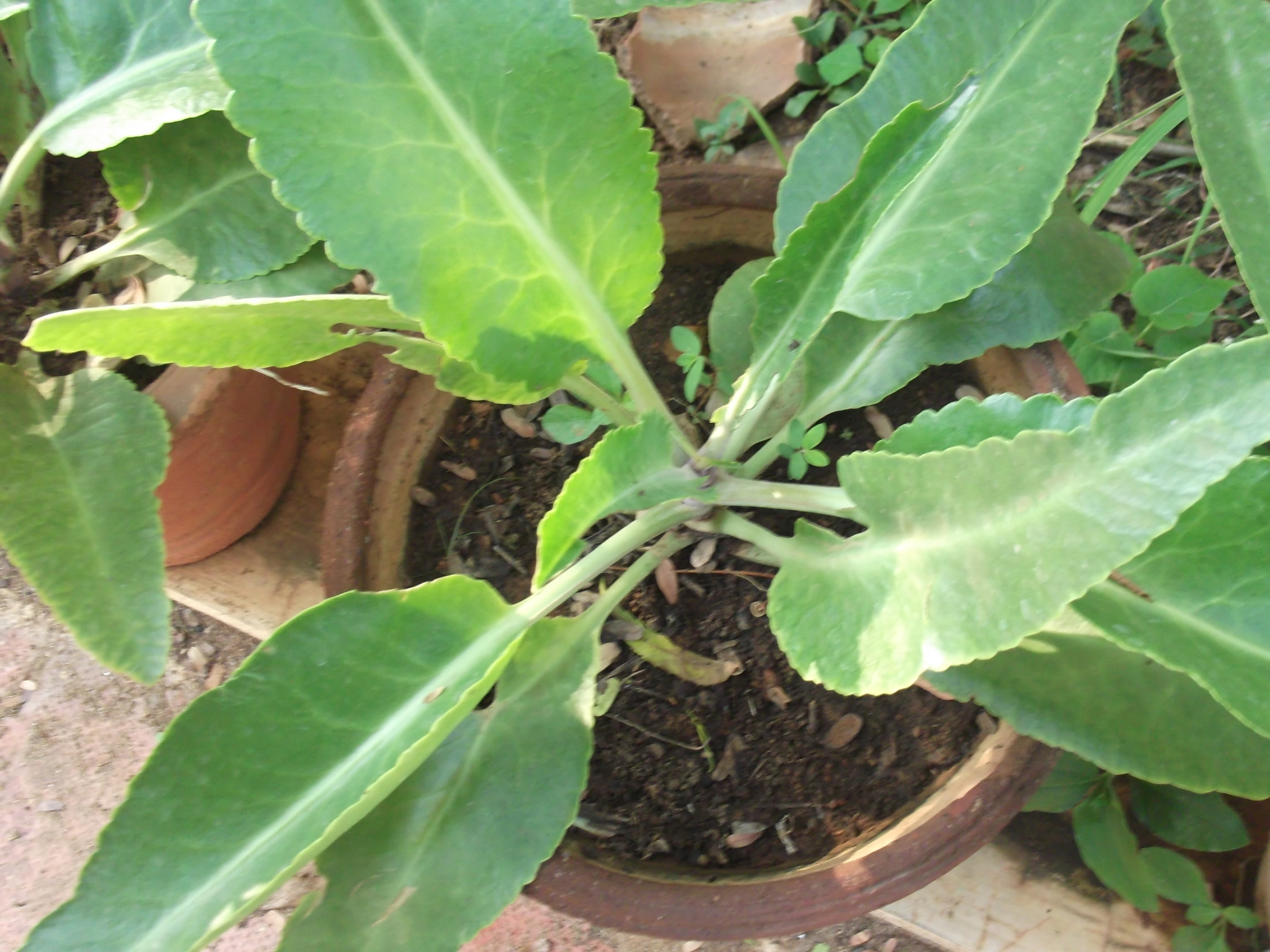

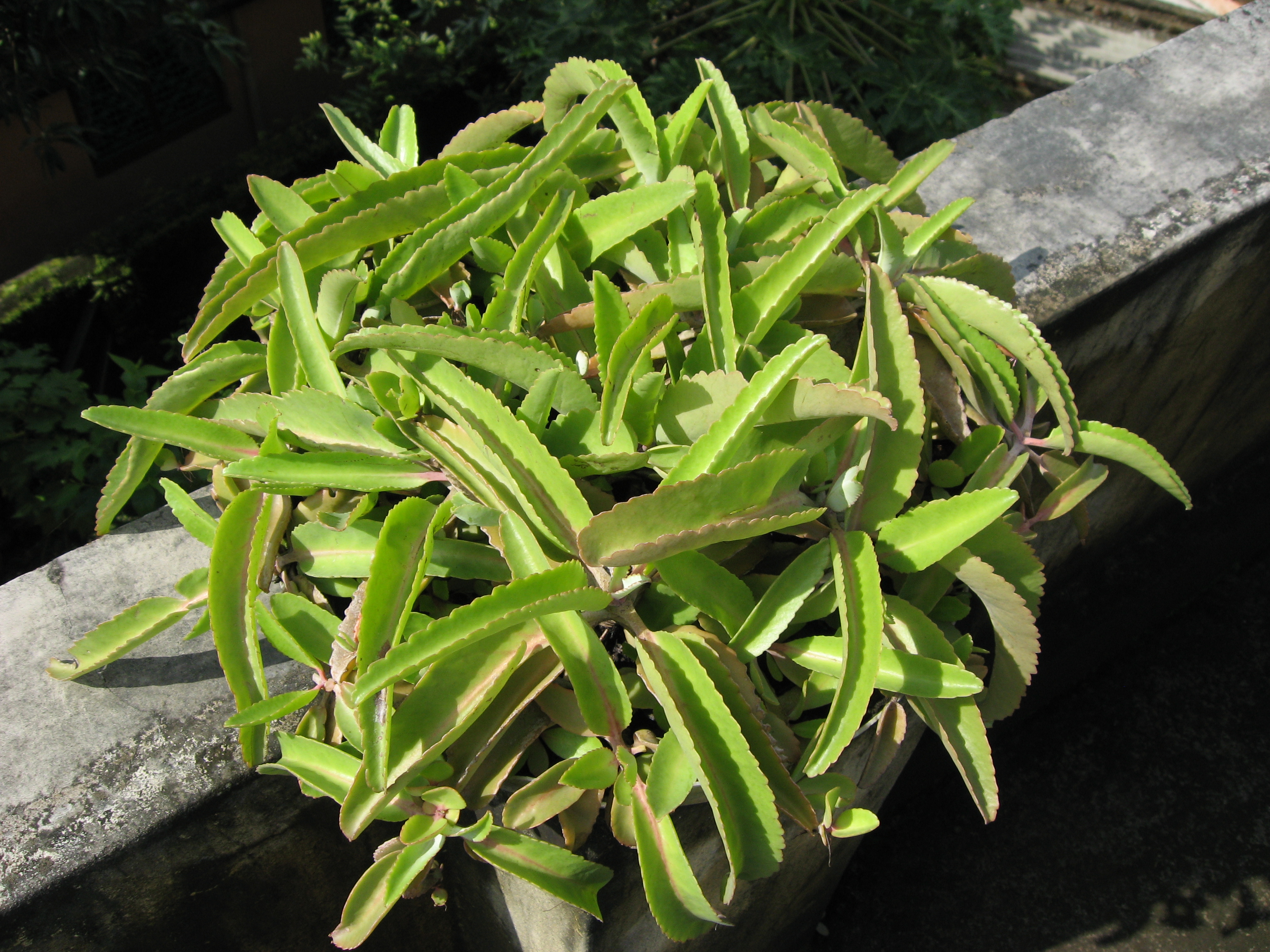

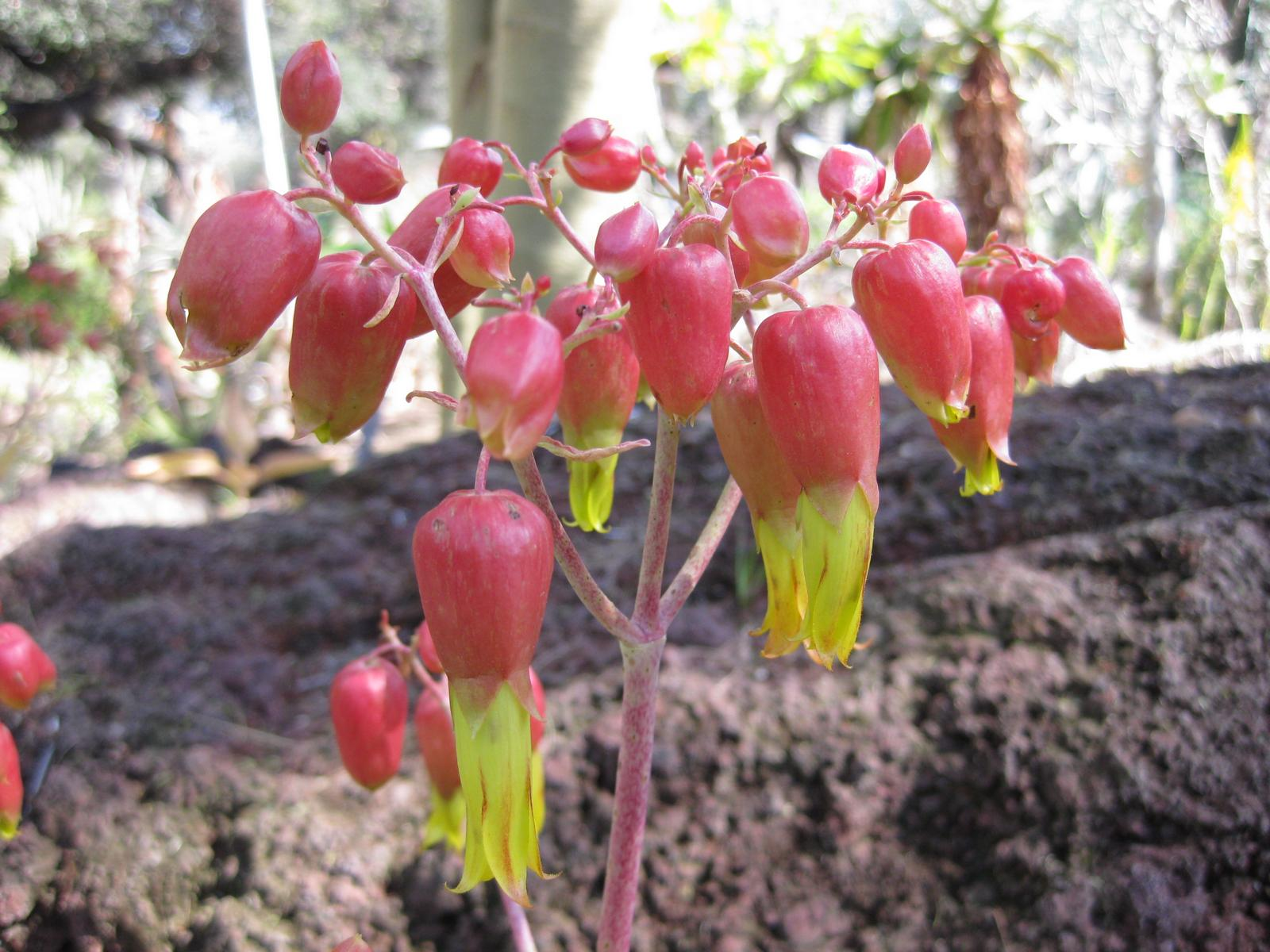

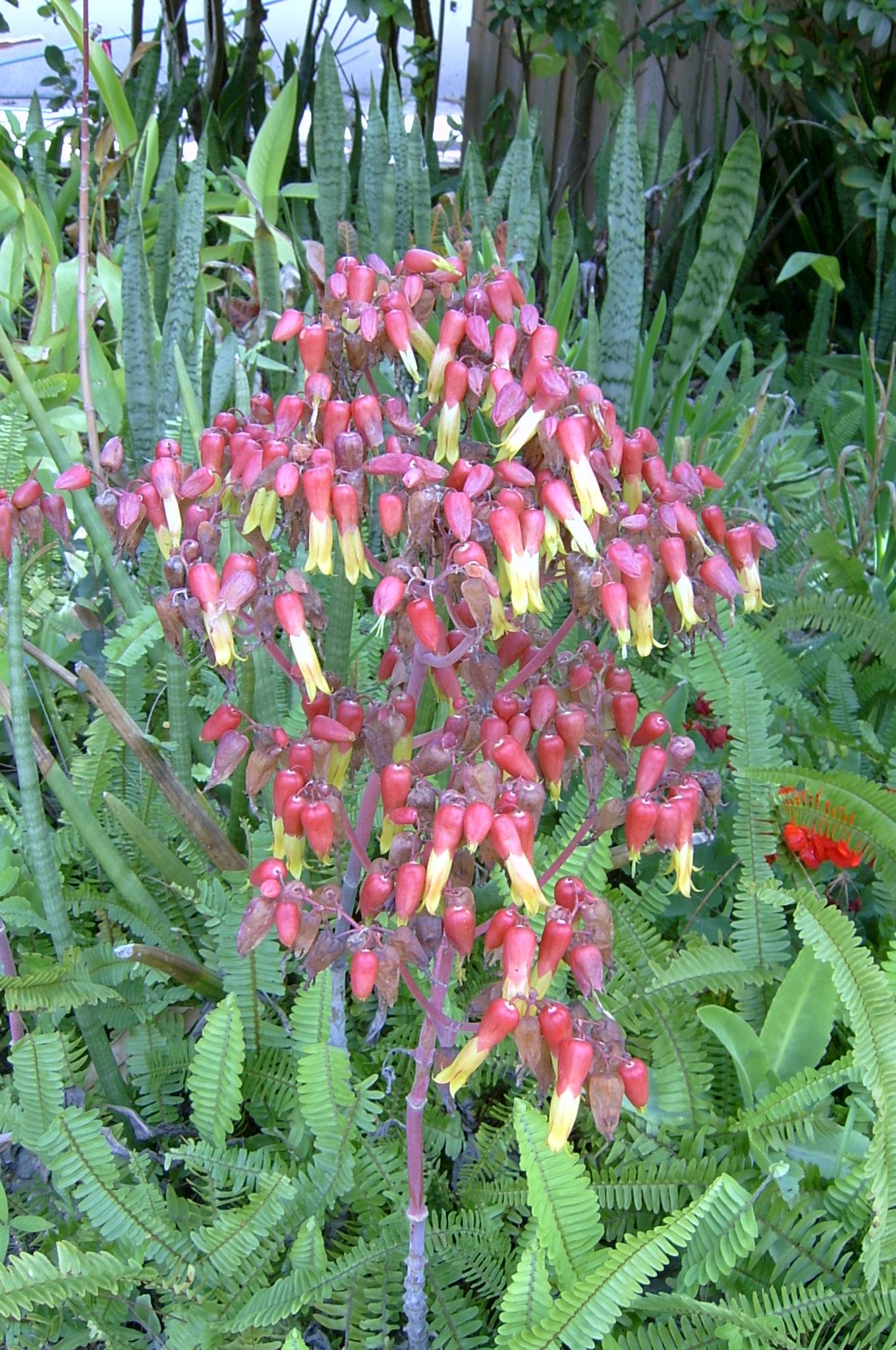

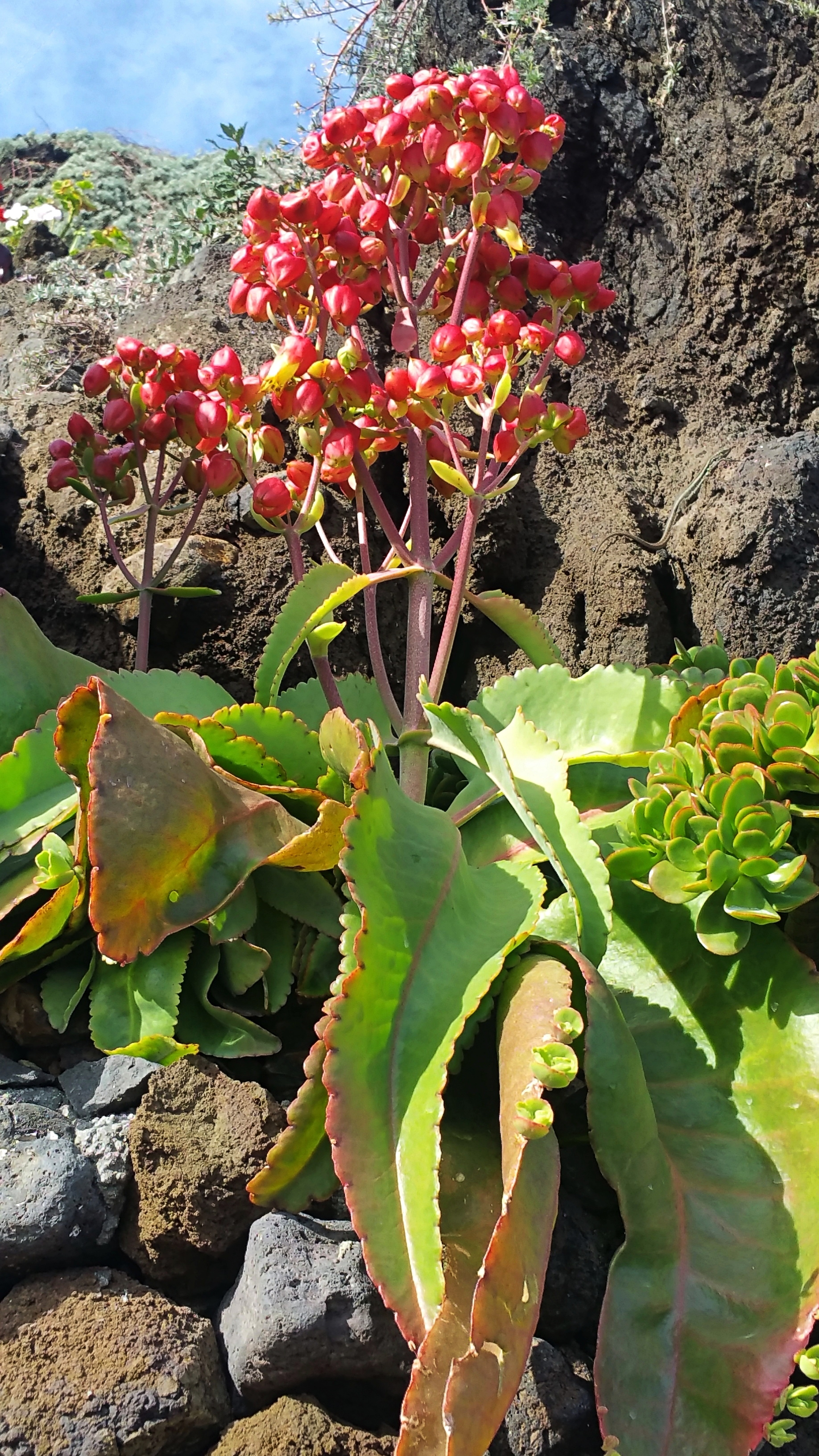
