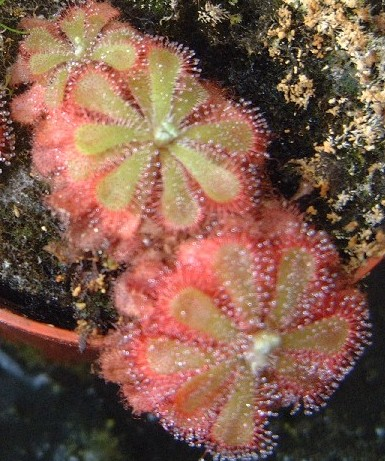

Scientific classification
- Kingdom: Plantae
- Clade: Tracheophytes
- Clade: Angiosperms
- Clade: Eudicots
- Order: Caryophyllales
- Family: Droseraceae
- Genus: Drosera
- Subgenus: Drosera subg. Drosera
- Section: Drosera sect. Drosera
- Species: D. aliciae

Binomial name
- Drosera aliciae Raym.-Hamet

Synonyms
- Drosera aliciae auct. non Raym.-Hamet [=Drosera aliciae/Drosera natalensis]; Drosera aliciae auct. non Raym.-Hamet [=Drosera slackii]; Drosera curviscapa Salt.; Drosera curviscapa var. esterhuyseniae Salt.; Drosera esterhuyseniae (Salt.) Debbert; ?Drosera rubrifolia Debbert; Drosera spathulata Hort. ex Behre [=Drosera aliciae/Drosera spatulata]

= Drosera aliciae =

Species of carnivorous plant

Drosera aliciae, the Alice sundew, is a carnivorous plant in the family Droseraceae. It is native to the Cape Provinces of South Africa, like Drosera capensis, the cape sundew, and is one of the most common sundews in cultivation.

== Description ==
The plant forms small, tight rosettes of wedge-shaped leaves, up to 5 cm in diameter. Under conditions of good lighting, the insect-snagging tentacles will become deeply coloured with anthocyanin pigments, which probably aid in its attraction of insect prey. The plant is relatively easy to grow, and produces attractive scapes of pink flowers, which are held about 30 cm away from the carnivorous leaves, so as to prevent pollinators from becoming ensnared. D. aliciae is very similar in form to a number of other closely related species such as D. slackii, and D. natalensis: the former is rather larger with a slightly different growth habit (8 cm diameter); the latter has hairier stipules and a larger distance between leaf base and the “sticky” trichomes.

Drosera aliciae has received the Royal Horticultural Society's Award of Garden Merit.

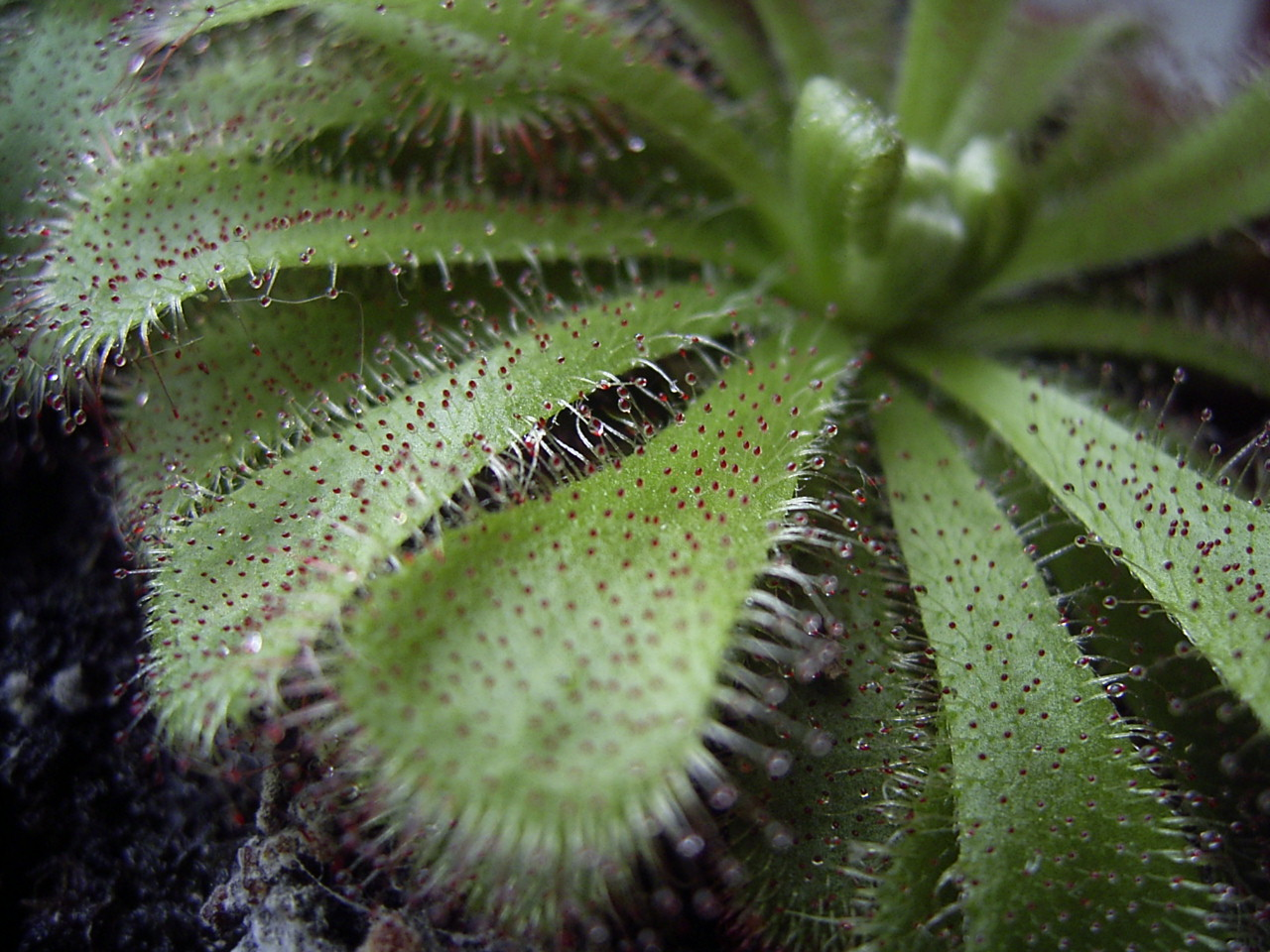
Detail of leaf

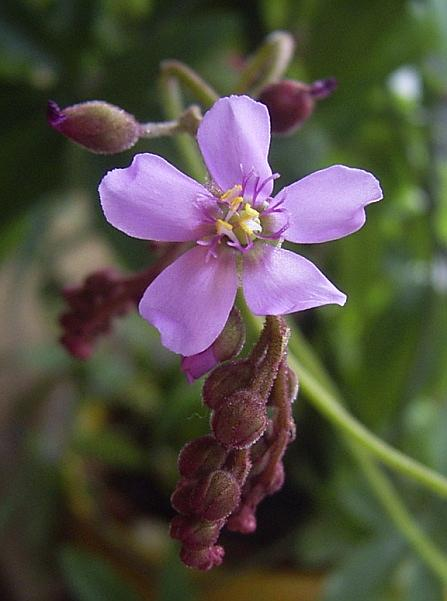
Flower

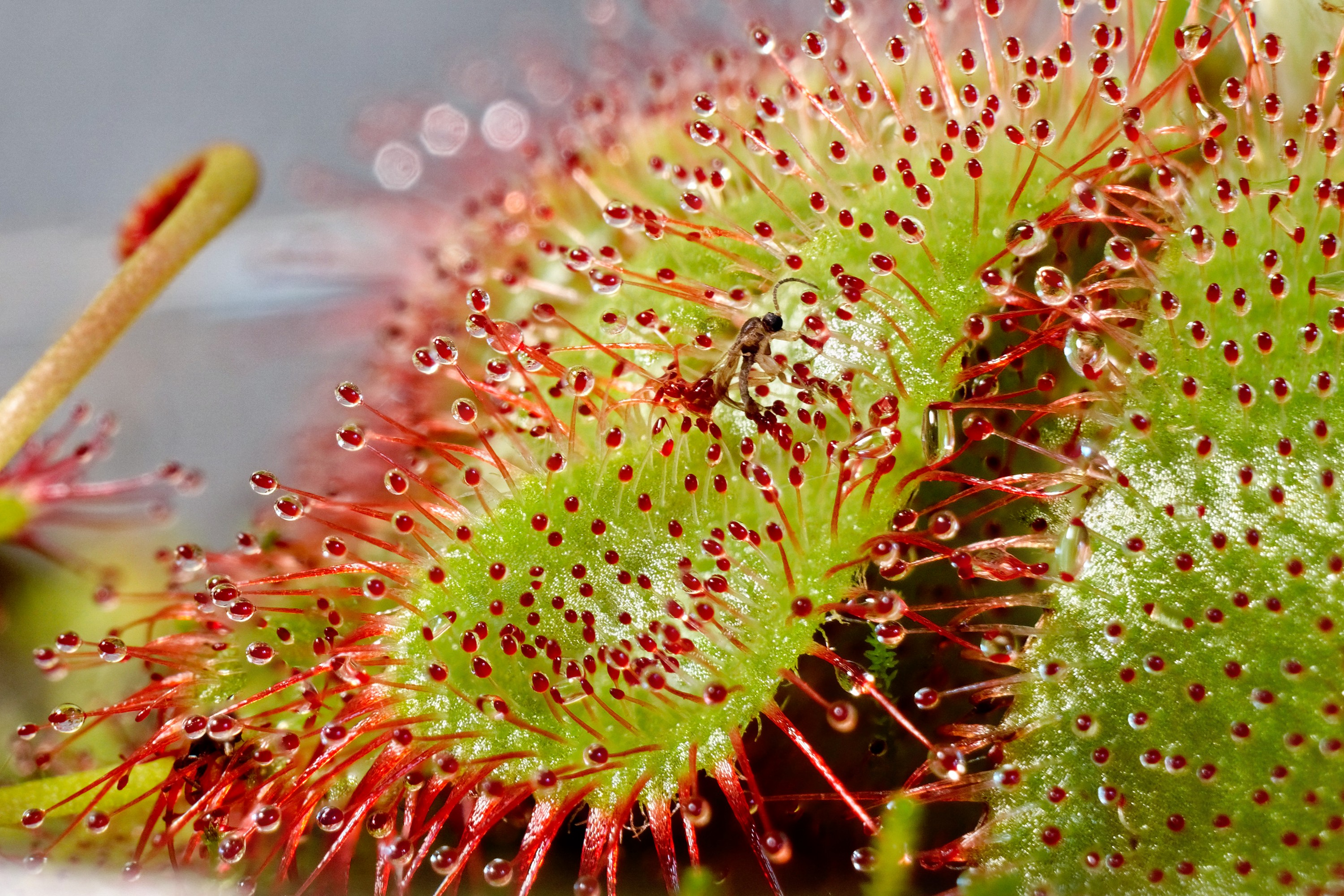
Leaf with a fruit fly reduced to chitin.
