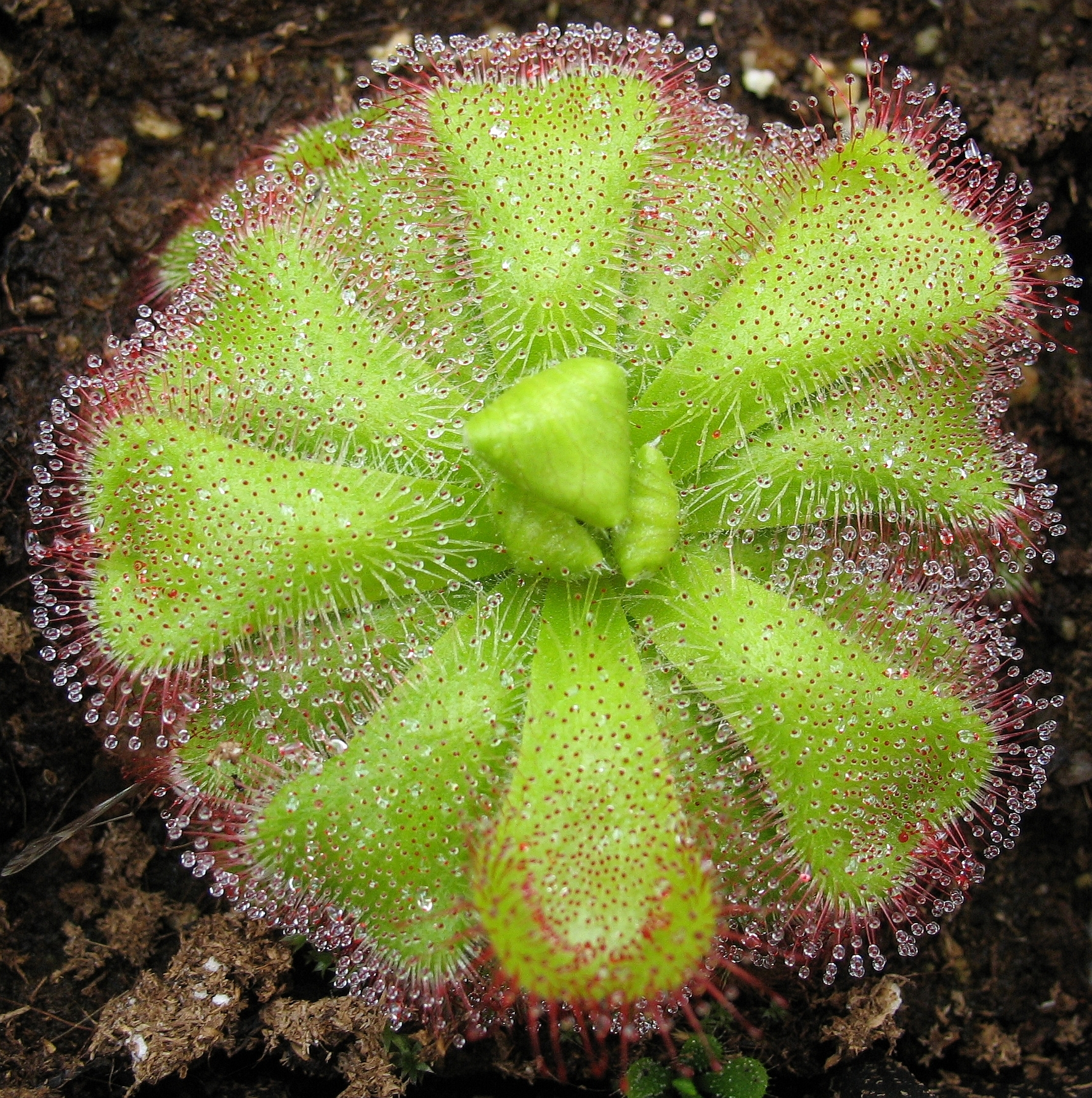

Scientific classification
- Kingdom: Plantae
- Clade: Tracheophytes
- Clade: Angiosperms
- Clade: Eudicots
- Order: Caryophyllales
- Family: Droseraceae
- Genus: Drosera
- Subgenus: Drosera subg. Drosera
- Section: Drosera sect. Drosera
- Species: D. cuneifolia

Binomial name
- Drosera cuneifolia L.f.

= Drosera cuneifolia =

Species of carnivorous plant

Drosera cuneifolia is a small rosette-forming species of perennial sundew native to the Cape in South Africa. It was first described in 1781.

Drosera cuneifolia produces green somewhat broad carnivorous leaves, up to 7 cm (2.8 in) long. D. cuneifolia can become up to 3 cm (1.2 in) in height without the inflorescence and 15 cm (5.9 in) wide.

In early winter, D. cuneifolia produces multiple (up to 20), small, pink to reddish-purple flowers at the end of scapes which can be up to 15 cm (5.9 in) tall. Flowers individually open in the morning and close by mid afternoon, lasting just one day. The flowers can self-pollinate upon closing. The seeds are very small, black, spindle-shaped, and are released from the capsules that form when the flower has died.

During summer in South Africa, D. cuneifolia oversummers. It is found only near the Table mountain complex in South Africa.
