= Raymond-Hamet =

French botanist (1890–1972)

- Raymond-Hamet
- Born: 1890
- Died: 1972 (aged 81–82)
- Citizenship: France
- Scientific career
- Fields: Botany
- Author abbrev. (botany): Raym.-Hamet

Raymond-Hamet (25 March 1890 – 2 October 1972) was a French botanist specializing in Crassulaceae.

He published his first species description, of a Kalanchoe at the age of fifteen. At eighteen, he published a complete and thorough revision of that genus, and continued to work on the genus for the remainder of his life. He has been described as "the undisputed authority on Kalanchoe during the 20th century".

== Some publications ==
- Raymond-Hamet, A. 1932. “Physiological action of the extract of muira puama.” Comp. Rend. Soc Biol 109: 1064-7
- ---. 1951. A new crystalline alkaloid extracted from a Rubiaceae of Gabon and belonging to a hitherto unknown chemical type. C R Hebd Seances Acad Sci. 232 (25): 2354-6
