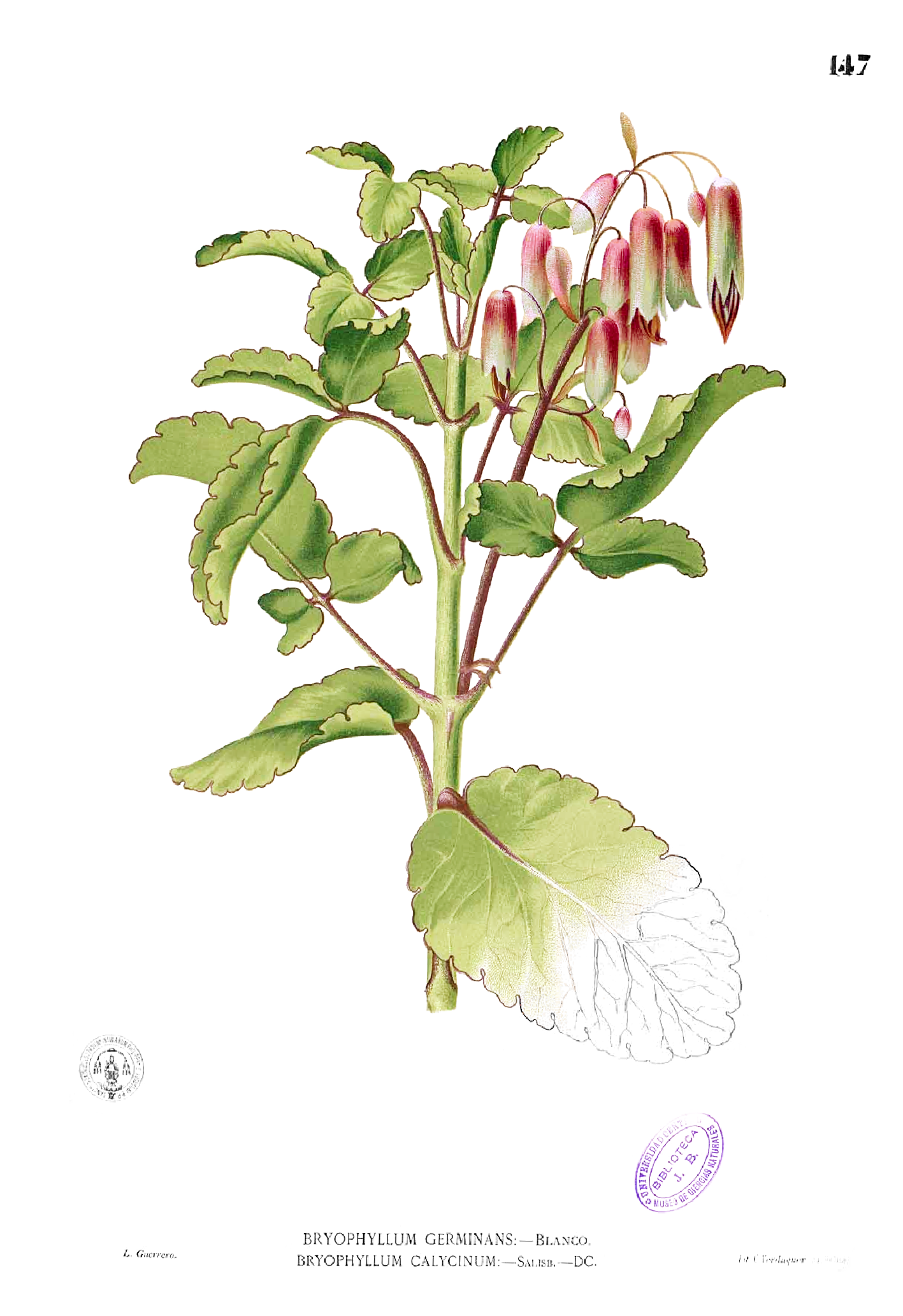
- The "Goethe Plant", Kalanchoe pinnata, illustrated in Flora de Filipinas by Francisco Manuel Blanco

Scientific classification
- Kingdom: Plantae
- Clade: Tracheophytes
- Clade: Angiosperms
- Clade: Eudicots
- Order: Saxifragales
- Family: Crassulaceae
- Genus: Kalanchoe
- Subgenus: Bryophyllum (Salisb.) Koord.

Species
- See text.

Synonyms
- Baumgartenia Tratt.; Bryophyllum Salisb.; Geaya Costantin & Poiss.; Kalanchoe sect. Bryophyllum (Salisb.) Boiteau

= Bryophyllum =

Section of flowering plants

Bryophyllum (from the Greek βρῦον/βρύειν bryon/bryein = sprout, φύλλον phyllon = leaf) is a group of plant species of the family Crassulaceae native to Madagascar. It is a section or subgenus within the genus Kalanchoe, and was formerly placed at the level of genus. This section is notable for vegetatively growing small plantlets on the fringes of the leaves; these eventually drop off and root. These plantlets arise from mitosis of meristematic-type tissue in notches in the leaves.

Nowadays, bryophyllums are naturalized in many parts of the tropics and subtropics, and deliberately cultivated for their attractiveness or for their interesting reproduction as a vegetative reproductive plant.

== Taxonomy ==
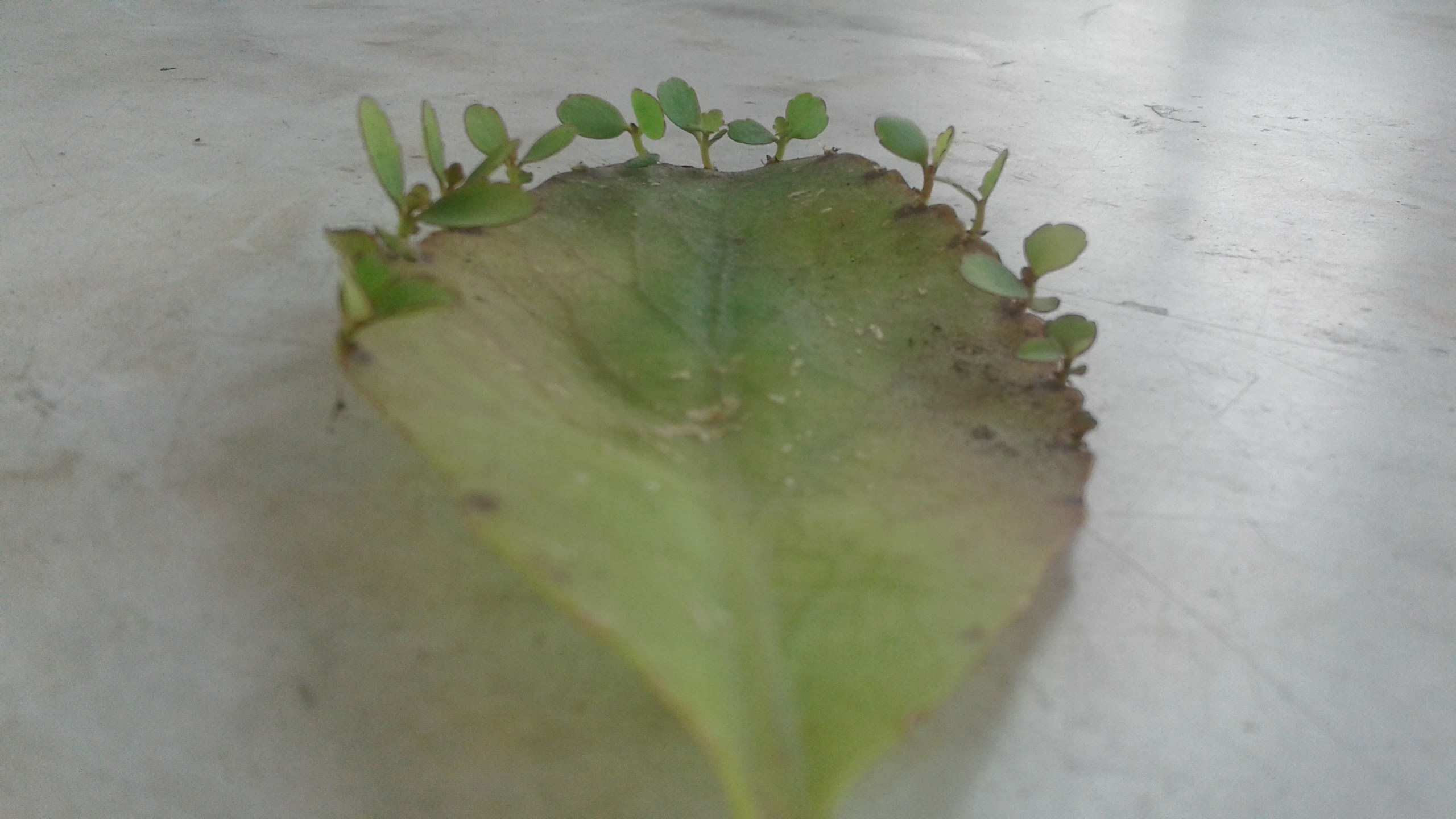
Vegetative Propagation in Bryophyllum leaf

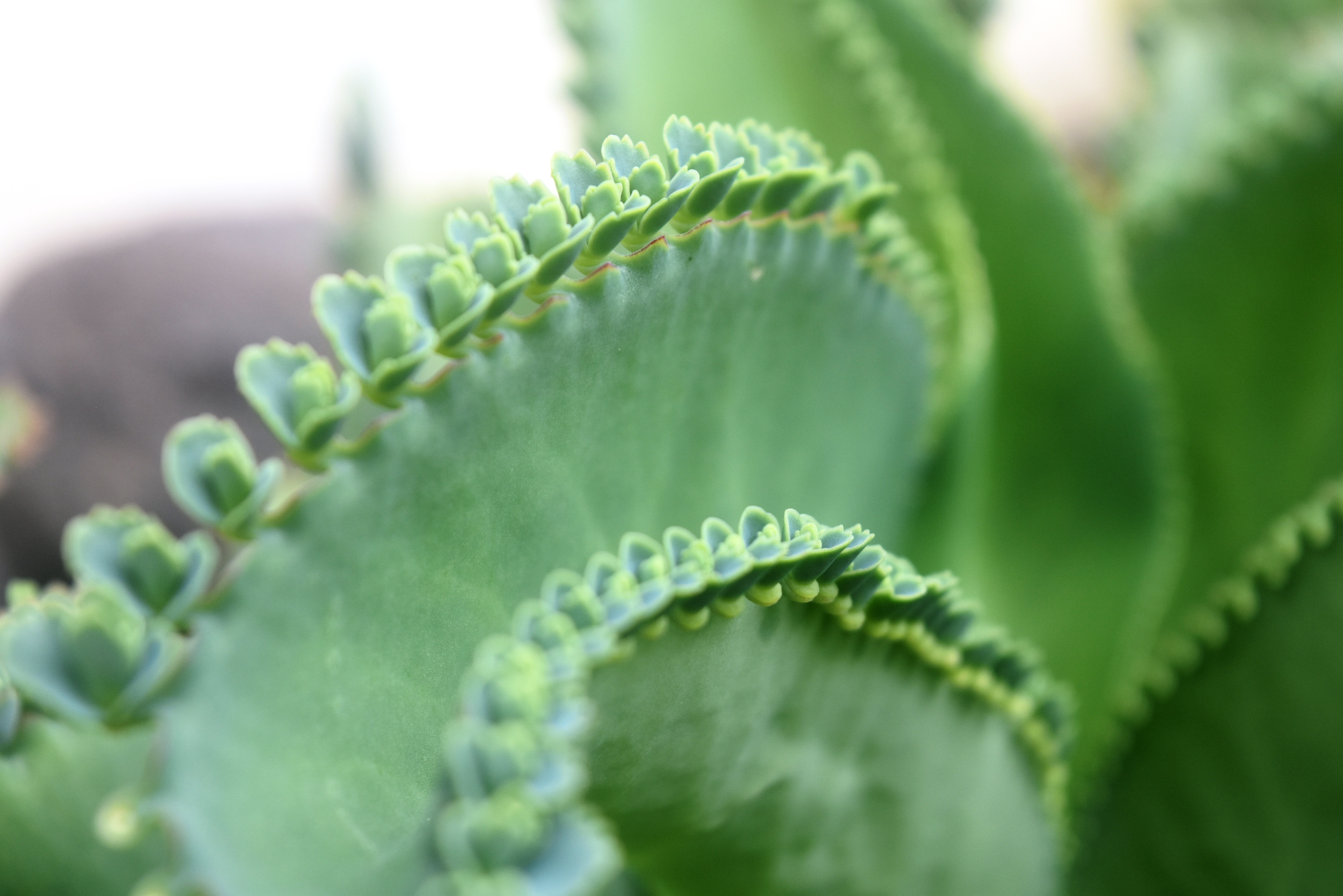
Kalanchoe laetivirens in the Philippines

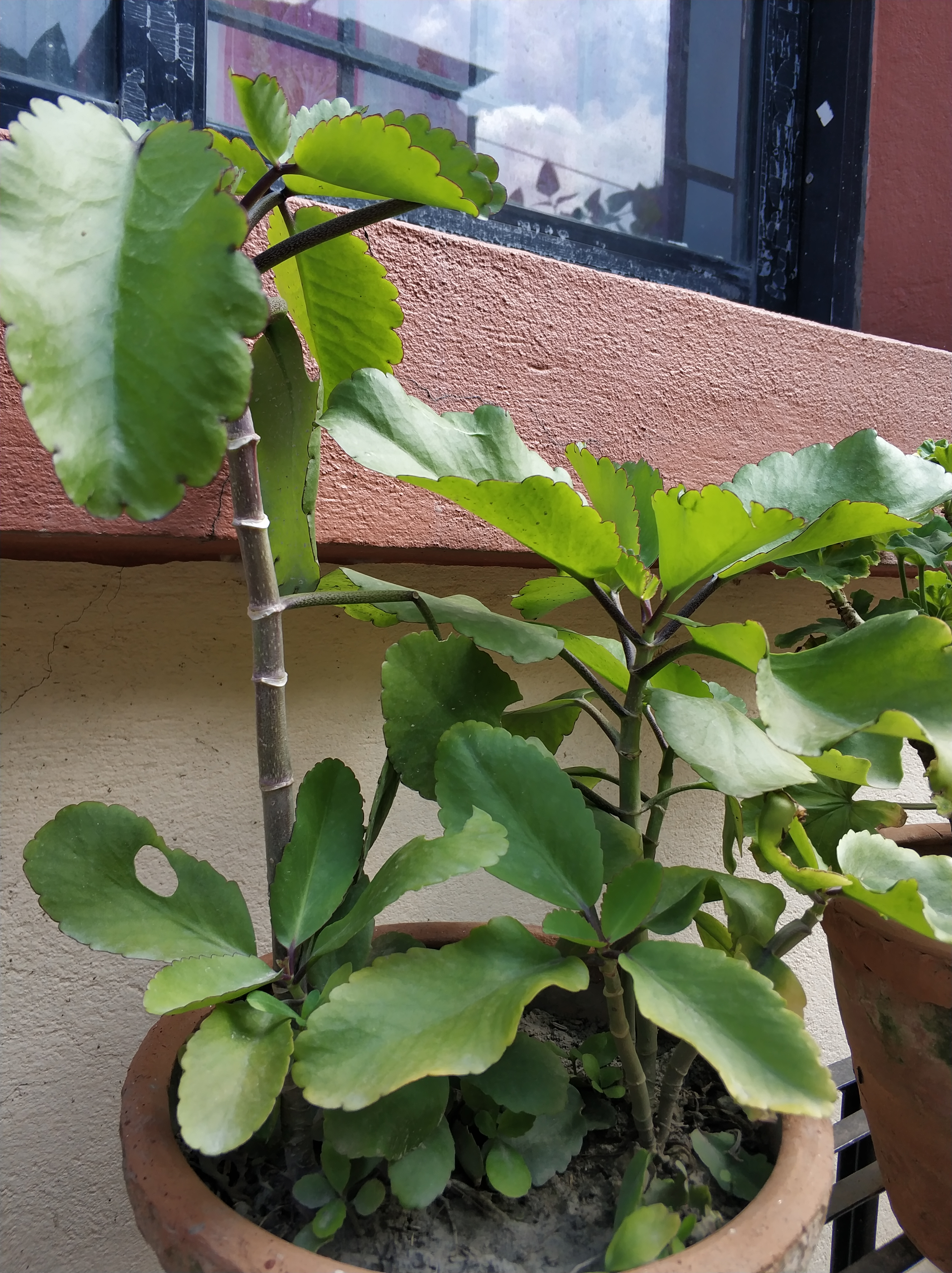
Kalanchoe pinnata in Nepal

Species of Bryophyllum are nested within Kalanchoe on molecular phylogenetic analysis. Therefore, Bryophyllum should be a section or subgenus of Kalanchoe rather than a separate genus.

The number of species within Bryophyllum varies with definitions of this section. Bryophyllum used to include not only species that produce plantlets on the leaf margin, but also many species that lack this character such as K. manginii and K. porphyrocalyx. However, the broadly defined Bryophyllum is polyphyletic. Bernard Descoings redefined Bryophyllum as 26 species, and molecular phylogenetic analysis shows that his definition is almost monophyletic, except that K. beauverdii and K. delagoensis (hence as well as their relatives and hybrids) should be included while K. pubescens and K. streptantha excluded. Therefore, Bryophyllum comprises about 40 species:

- Kalanchoe beauverdii
- Kalanchoe bogneri
- Kalanchoe costantinii
- Kalanchoe curvula
- Kalanchoe cymbifolia
- Kalanchoe daigremontiana
- Kalanchoe delagoensis
- Kalanchoe × descoingsii: K. delagoensis × K. laetivirens
- Kalanchoe fedtschenkoi
- Kalanchoe gastonis-bonnieri
- Kalanchoe guignardii
- Kalanchoe × houghtonii: K. daigremontiana × K. delagoensis
- Kalanchoe humifica
- Kalanchoe inopinata
- Kalanchoe laetivirens
- Kalanchoe laxiflora
- Kalanchoe × lokarana: K. laxiflora × K. sp. (K. rosei, K. variifolia, or K. perrieri)
- Kalanchoe macrochlamys
- Kalanchoe marnieriana
- Kalanchoe maromokotrensis
- Kalanchoe mortagei
- Kalanchoe peltigera
- Kalanchoe perrieri
- Kalanchoe pinnata
- Kalanchoe × poincarei: K. beauverdii × K. sp. (K. rosei, K. variifolia, K. perrieri, or K. daigremontiana)
- Kalanchoe prolifera
- Kalanchoe × rechingeri: K. costantinii × K. delagoensis
- Kalanchoe × richaudii: K. delagoensis × K. sp. (K. rosei, K. variifolia, or K. perrieri)
- Kalanchoe rosei
- Kalanchoe rubella
- Kalanchoe sanctula
- Kalanchoe scandens
- Kalanchoe serrata
- Kalanchoe suarezensis
- Kalanchoe tenuiflora
- Kalanchoe torrejacqii
- Kalanchoe variifolia
- Kalanchoe waldheimii

If Bryophyllum is regarded as a subgenus, three more species should be included:

- Kalanchoe aromatica
- Kalanchoe bouvetii
- Kalanchoe manambolensis

== Toxicity ==
Several species of Kalanchoe are economically important for causing cardiotoxic effects in sheep and cattle, and diseases affecting the nervous system and muscles known as krimpsiekte ("shrinking disease") or as cotyledonosis. Kalanchoe pinnata may have similar chemical components, bufadienolide alkaloids.
