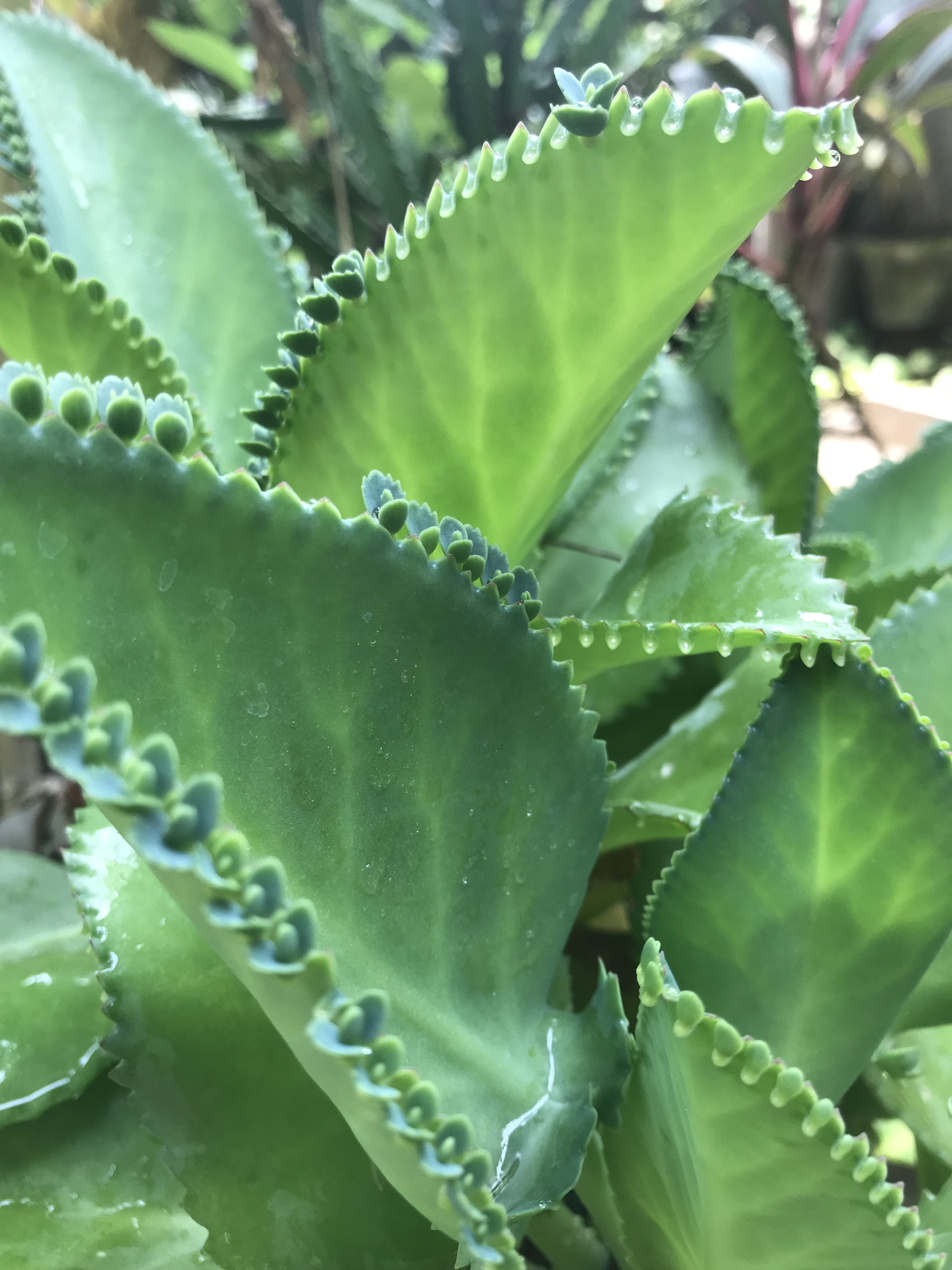
- Plantlets on leaves

Scientific classification
- Kingdom: Plantae
- Clade: Tracheophytes
- Clade: Angiosperms
- Clade: Eudicots
- Order: Saxifragales
- Family: Crassulaceae
- Genus: Kalanchoe
- Species: K. laetivirens

Binomial name
- Kalanchoe laetivirens Desc.

Synonyms
- Bryophyllum laetivirens (Desc.) V.V.Byalt

= Kalanchoe laetivirens =

Species of succulent

Kalanchoe laetivirens is a species of Kalanchoe (section Bryophyllum). It was thought to be a hybrid between K. daigremontiana and K. laxiflora (syn. Bryophyllum crenatum), and therefore a group of invalid names for such a hybrid, including Kalanchoe crenodaigremontiana, Kalanchoe crenato-daigremontiana, Bryophyllum crenodaigremontianum and Bryophyllum crenato-daigremontianum, are just synonyms of K. laetivirens. However, their true hybrid is distinct from this species.

It is often misidentified as one of its putative parents, K. daigremontiana, which has bands or spots on the back of leaves, while the leaves of K. laetivirens are completely green, as indicated by its epithet laetivirens which means "lushly green".

== Gallery ==
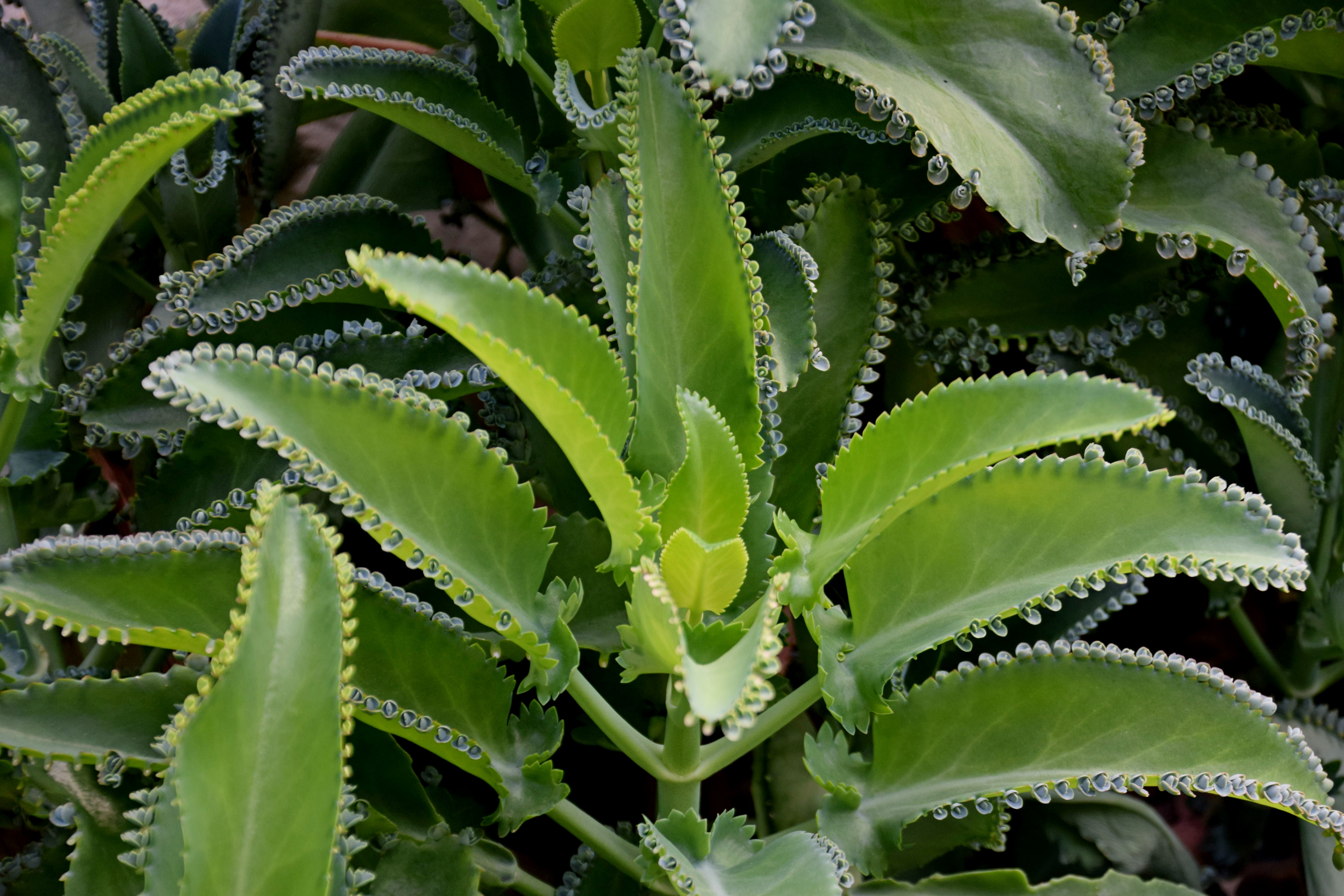

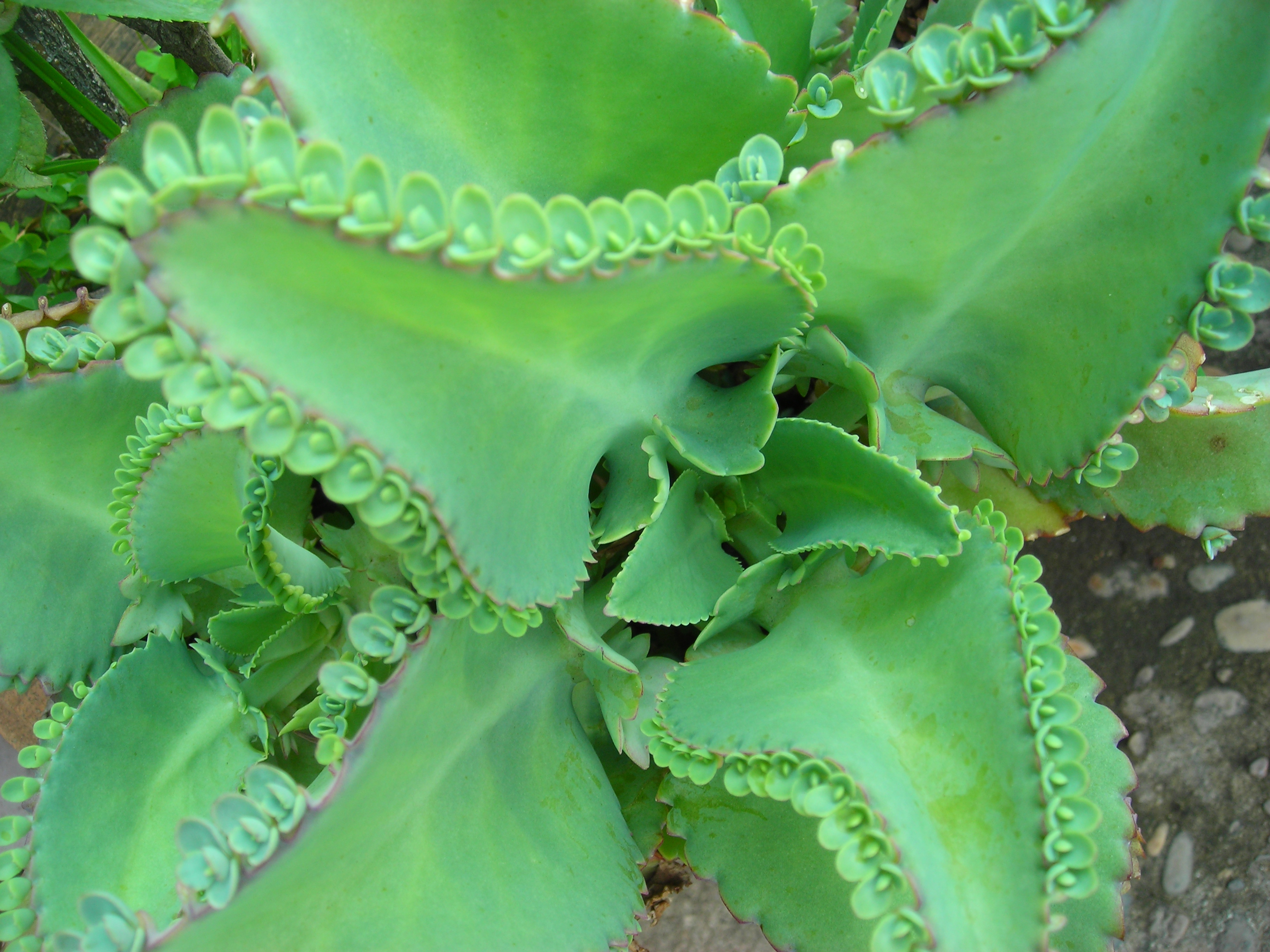

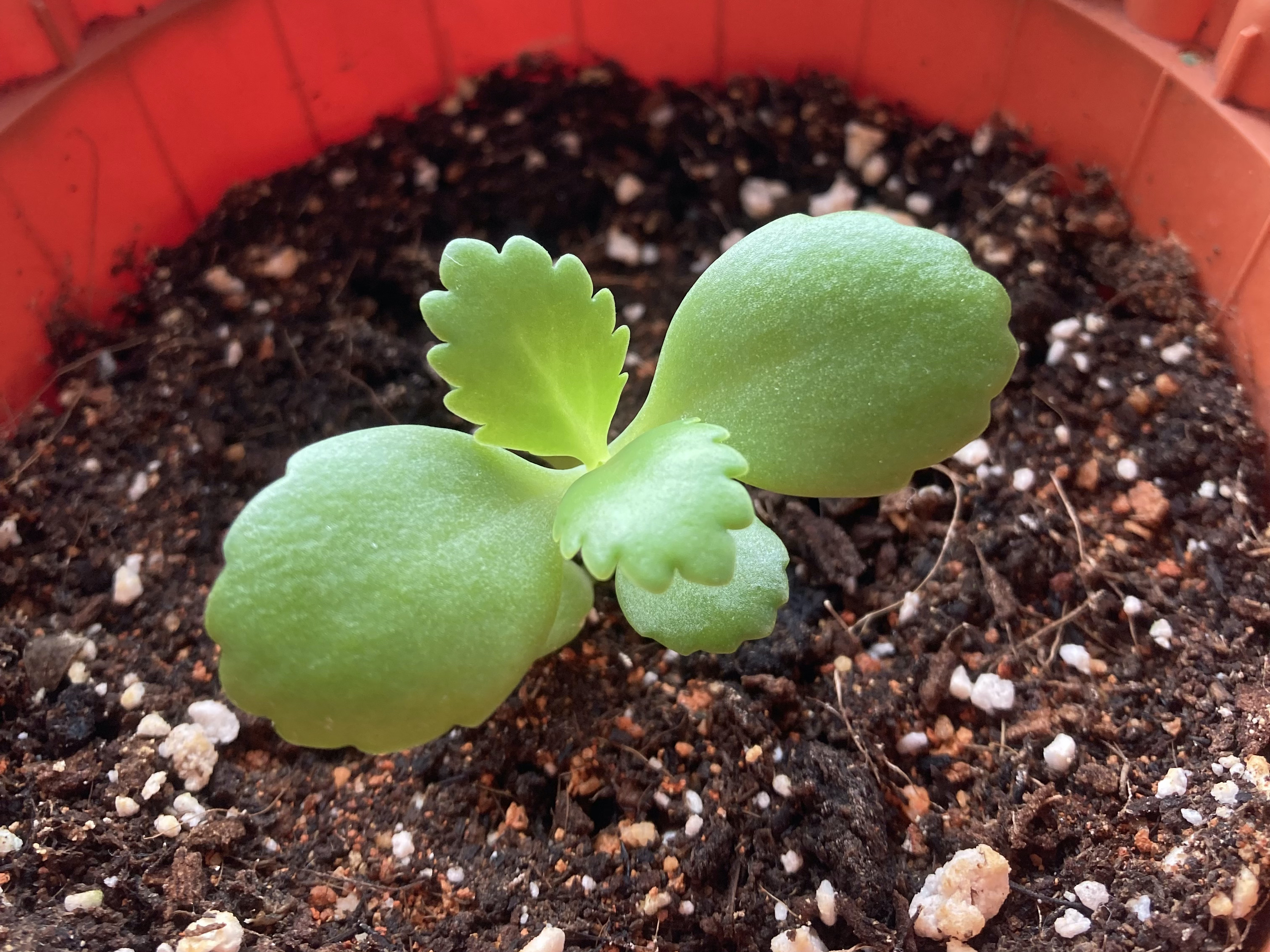
