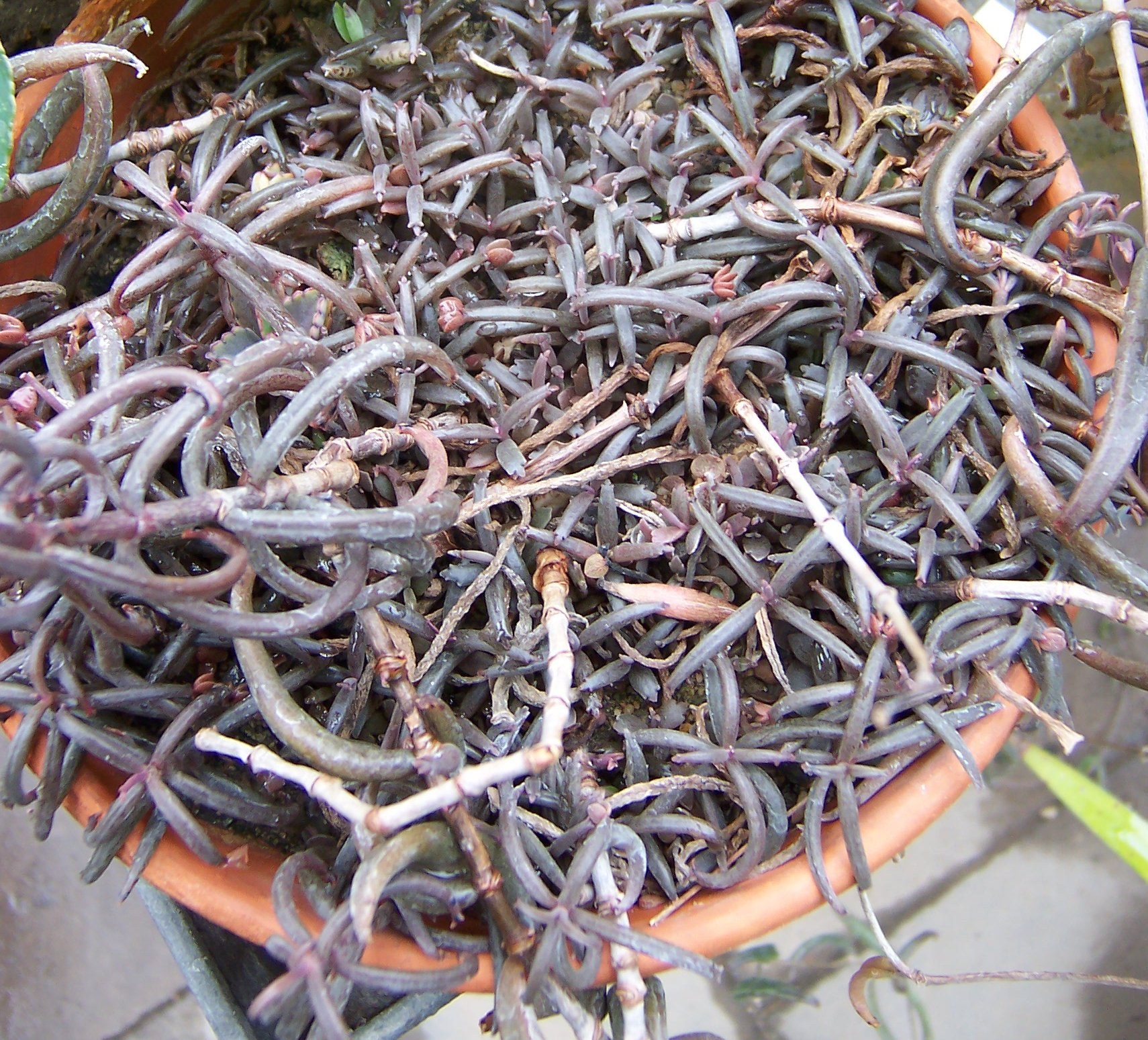

Scientific classification
- Kingdom: Plantae
- Clade: Tracheophytes
- Clade: Angiosperms
- Clade: Eudicots
- Order: Saxifragales
- Family: Crassulaceae
- Genus: Kalanchoe
- Species: K. scandens

Binomial name
- Kalanchoe scandens H.Perrier

Synonyms
- Bryophyllum scandens (H.Perrier) A.Berger; Kalanchoe beauverdii var. parviflora Boiteau & Mannoni

= Kalanchoe scandens =

Species of plant

Kalanchoe scandens is a climbing species of Kalanchoe subg. Bryophyllum native to Madagascar. It is closely related to K. beauverdii, K. costantinii, and K. guignardii, but differs in its sessile linear leaves.

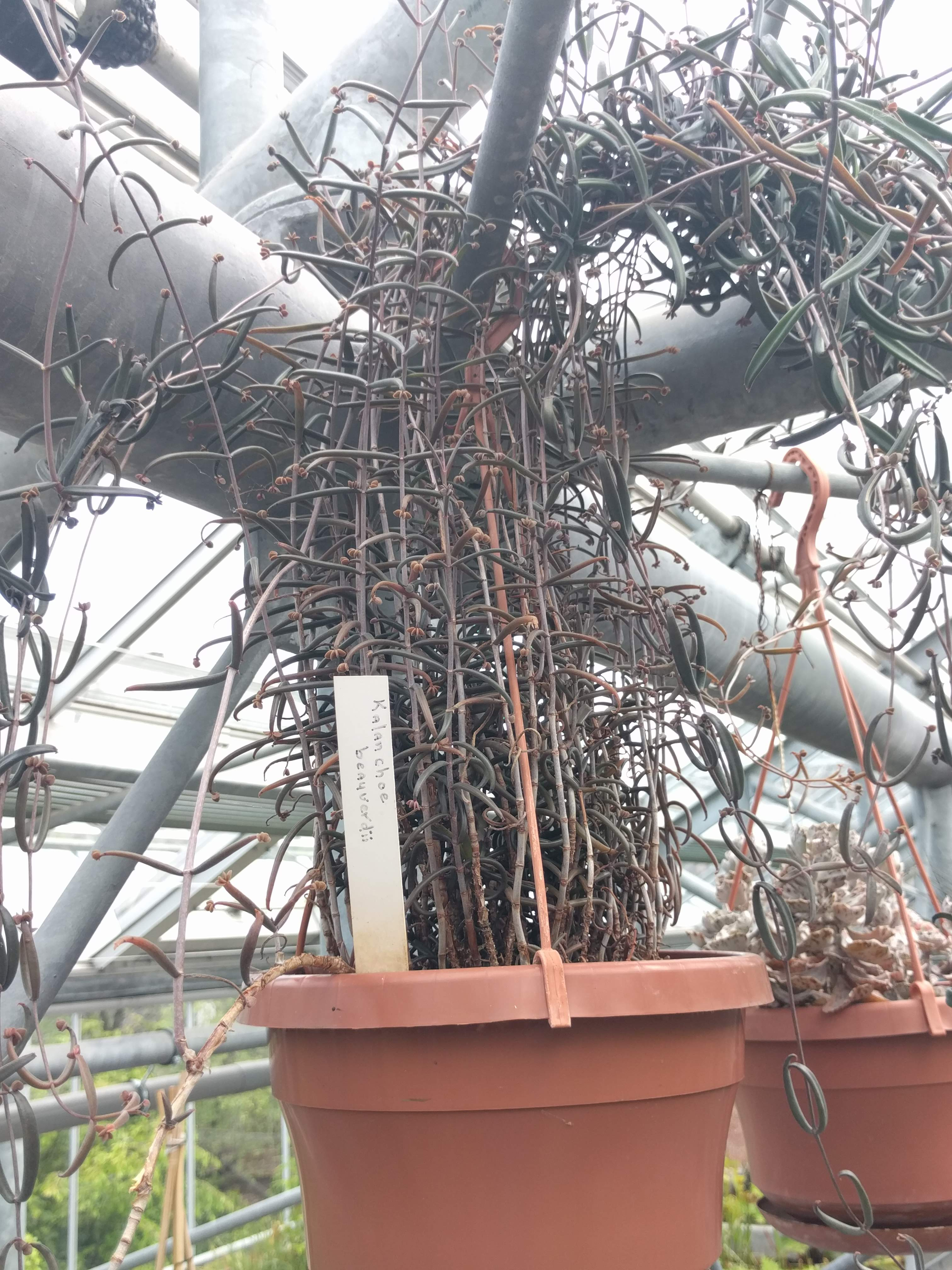
