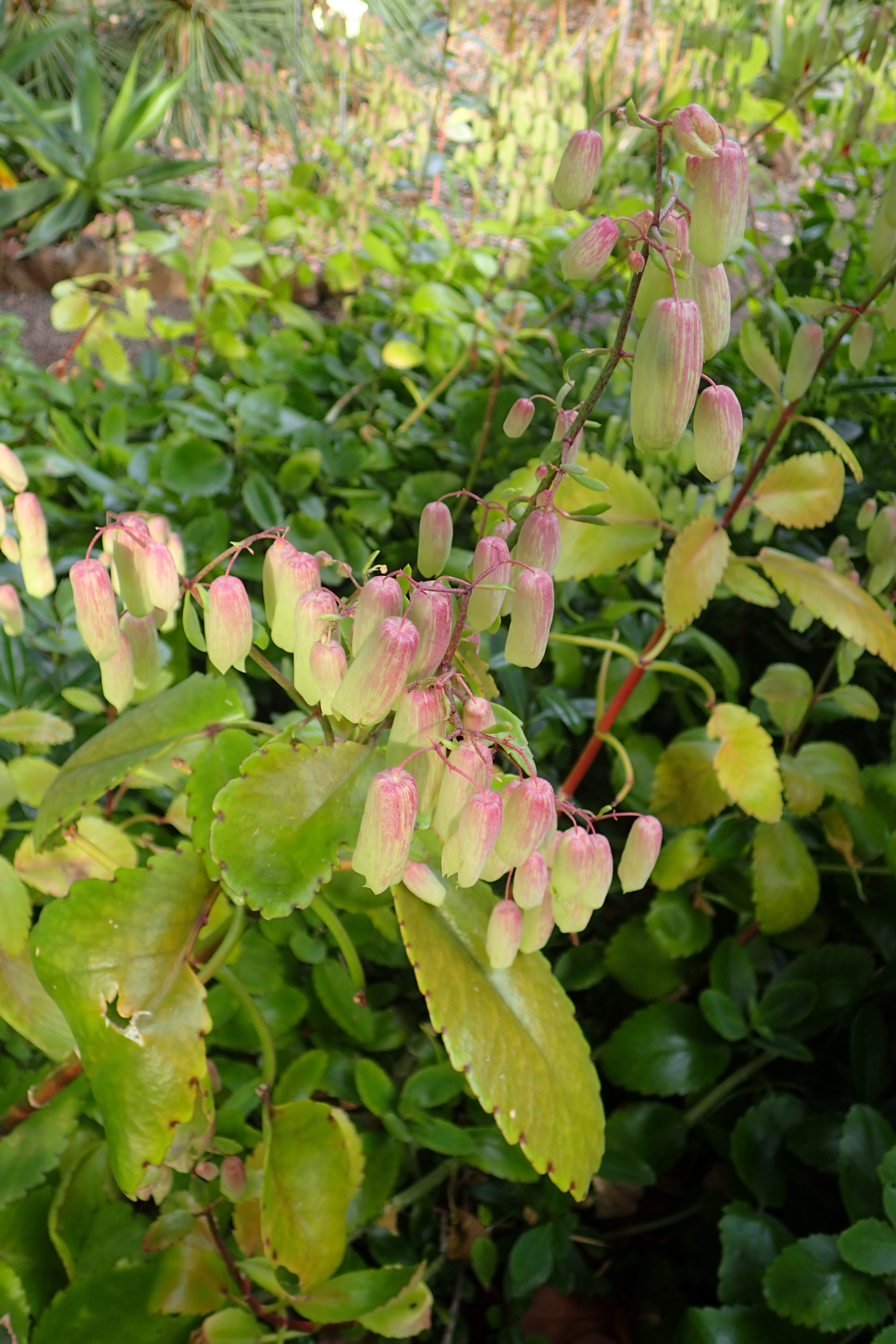
- Leaves and flowers

Scientific classification
- Kingdom: Plantae
- Clade: Tracheophytes
- Clade: Angiosperms
- Clade: Eudicots
- Order: Saxifragales
- Family: Crassulaceae
- Genus: Kalanchoe
- Species: K. pinnata

Binomial name
- Kalanchoe pinnata (Lam.) Pers.

Synonyms
- Bryophyllum calcicola (H.Perrier) V.V.Byalt; Bryophyllum calycinum Salisb.; Bryophyllum germinans Blanco; Bryophyllum pinnatum (Lam.) Oken; Cotyledon calycina Roth; Cotyledon calyculata Sol. ex Sims; Cotyledon pinnata Lam.; Cotyledon rhizophylla Roxb.; Crassula pinnata (Lam.) L.f.; Crassuvia floripendia Comm. ex Lam.; Kalanchoe brevicalyx (Raym.-Hamet & H.Perrier) Boiteau; Kalanchoe calcicola (H. Perrier) Boiteau; Kalanchoe floripendula Steud.

= Kalanchoe pinnata =

Succulent plant native to Madagascar

Kalanchoe pinnata, commonly known as cathedral bells, air plant, life plant, miracle leaf, and love bush, is a succulent plant native to Madagascar. It is a popular houseplant and has become naturalized in tropical and subtropical areas. The species is distinctive for the profusion of miniature plantlets that form on the margins of its leaves, a trait it has in common with some other members of Bryophyllum (now included in Kalanchoe).

== Description ==
The leaves of this species are thick, fleshy, elliptical in shape, curved, with a crenate or serrated margin, often reddish. Simple at the base of the stem, the leaves are imparipinnate at the top, 10–30 cm (4–12 in) long, with three to five pairs of fleshy limb lobes.

The leaves are remarkable for their ability to produce bulbils. At their margin, between the teeth, adventitious buds appear, which produce roots, stems and leaves. This is a fairly common trait in the section Bryophyllum. The fruits are follicles (10–15 mm) which are found in the persistent calyx and corolla.

The terminal inflorescence is a panicle, with many pendent, red-orange flowers. The calyx is formed of a long tube, red at the base, veined with yellowish green (or green spotted with reddish brown), with four very small triangular lobes at the end. The tubular corolla, with a pronounced constriction separating the subspherical part of the ovoid part, is terminated by four lobes which reaches 5 cm (2.0 in) in length. It is yellowish in color with red-purple streaks. The eight stamens, each about 4 cm (1.6 in) long, are in two whorls, welded on the corolla. The ovary has four carpels, slightly fused together in the center, with slender styles.

== Distribution ==
Kalanchoe pinnata is native to Madagascar. and has become naturalized in tropical and subtropical areas, inhabiting warm and temperate climates from sea level to 2,600 m (8,500 ft), occupying sites on rock in tropical evergreen and dry deciduous forests, as well as montane forests. It is found in parts of Asia, Africa, Australia, New Zealand, the West Indies, Bermuda, Macaronesia, the Mascarenes, Brazil, Suriname, the Galapagos Islands, Melanesia, Polynesia, and Hawaii. In many of these, such as Hawaii, it is regarded as an invasive species. Much of the reason for the widespread naturalization of this plant can be traced to its popularity as a garden plant.

== Taxonomy and nomenclature ==
The plant Kalanchoe pinnata was harvested by Pierre Sonnerat in Isle de France (Mauritius) and communicated to Lamarck who described it in 1786 as the Cotyledon pinnata. Subsequently, the Paris naturalist Christiaan Hendrik Persoon reclassified it in the Kalanchoe (calling it Calanchoe pinnata 1805-1807, with an orthographic variant). It was first published in Syn. Pl. vol.1 on page 446 in 1805. At the same time, in London, the botanist Richard Anthony Salisbury described the same plant from a specimen received from Bengal, under the name of Bryophyllum calycinum, and at the same time created the new genus Bryophyllum.

The specific Latin specific epithet "pinnata" is the feminine form of the Latin adjective pinnatus, meaning "pinnate".

It has several local names in its native Madagascar: falatanantsifaona, malainana, rendadiaka, sodifafana and tsilafafa. In the Philippines, it is known as katakataka or kataka-taka which is an adjective meaning 'astonishing' or 'remarkable'.

The writer Johann Wolfgang von Goethe (1749–1832), who was an amateur naturalist of some repute, was "passionately fond" of this plant and liked to give baby plantlets of the air plant, as gifts to friends who visited his home. He also discussed his air plant at length in an essay in 1817, titled in German: Geschichte meiner botanischen Studien ("History of my botanical studies").

== Cultivation ==
In temperate regions, Kalanchoe pinnata is grown as an indoor ornamental plant. Like most succulents, it cannot survive hard frost and will not thrive in environments in which the temperature drops below 10 °C (50 °F). It favours well-drained soil, the roots being otherwise susceptible to rot. In the tropics, K. pinnata is grown outdoors in gardens, from which it may escape to become naturalised - often as an invasive weed.

== Toxicity and traditional medicine ==
In common with other species belonging to the Crassulaceae (including certain members of the genera Tylecodon, Cotyledon and Adromischus), Kalanchoe pinnata has been found to contain bufadienolide cardiac glycosides These can cause cardiac poisoning, particularly in grazing animals.

Bryophyllum pinnatum has been recorded in Trinidad and Tobago as being used as a traditional treatment for hypertension.

In traditional medicine, the juice of the leaves is also used for kidney stones; although there is ongoing research into and some scientific evidence for this use, further research is required. In the French Antilles, Kalanchoe pinnata called locally as zeb maltet, is used in local application against headaches. For the people of the Amazon, Kalanchoe has multiple uses: the Creoles use it roasted against inflammations and cancer and as an infusion, and as a popular remedy for fevers. The Palikur people of Brazil and French Guiana apply a preparation of the juice of Kalanchoe leaves mixed with coconut oil to their foreheads to treat headache.

=== Chemical constituents ===
Bufadienolide compounds isolated from Bryophyllum pinnatum include bryophillin A, bersaldegenin-3-acetate, and bryophillin C. Bryophillin C also showed insecticidal properties.

Phytochemical studies of Kalanchoe pinnata have identified the presence of triterpenes, steroid, phenanthrene, flavonoid, flavones, chalcones, taraxasterol, aurones, phenolic acid, caffeic acid, syringic acid, malic, oxalic and ferulic acid. Bufadienolides and phenanthrene are toxic compounds. Two calves fed for 48 hours with K. pinnata have been reported to have died due to ataxia and severe cardiac arrhythmia.

== Host plant ==
Kalanchoe pinnata is a host plant of the Red Pierrot butterfly.

== Gallery ==
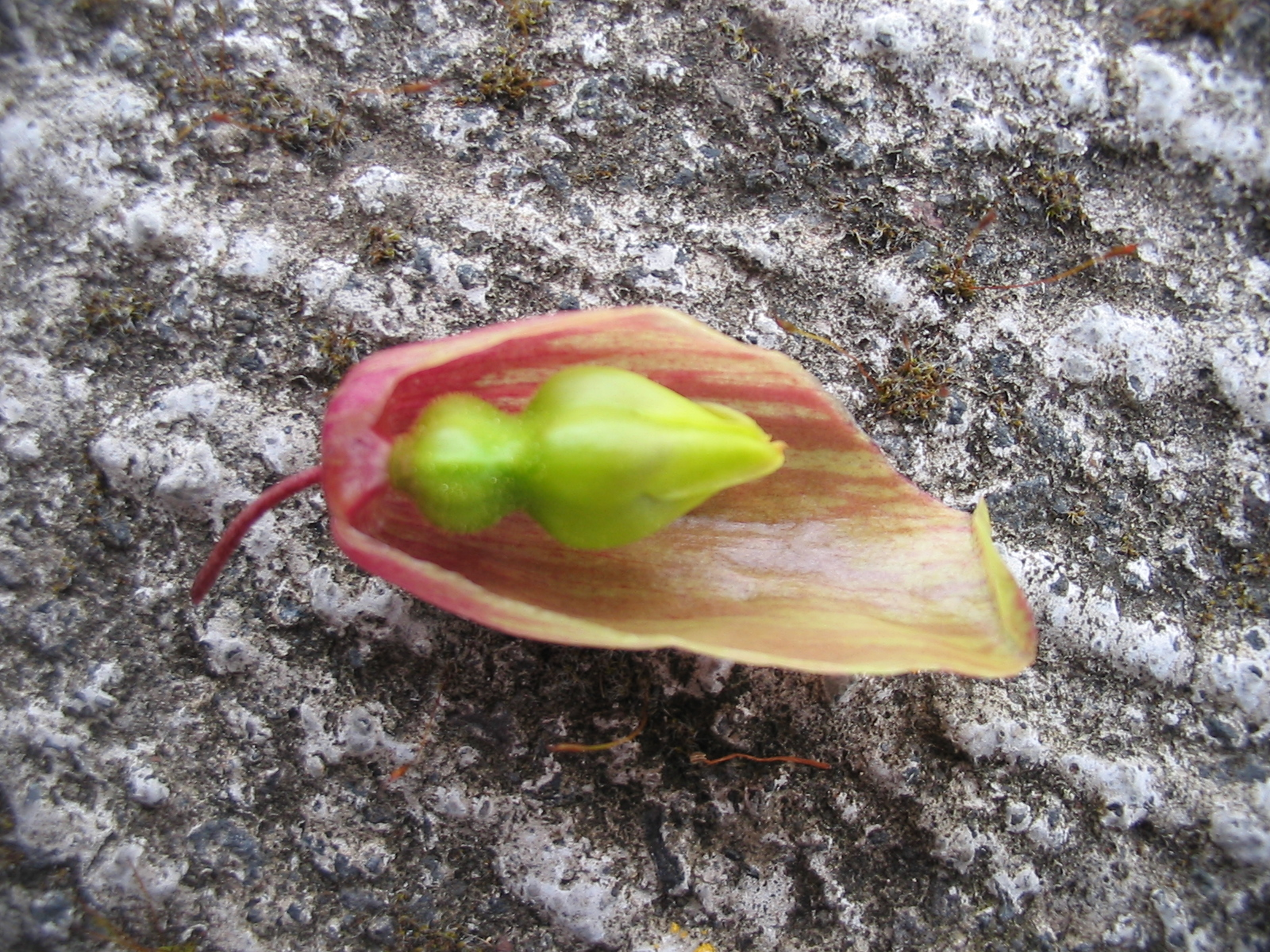
Closeup of opening flower

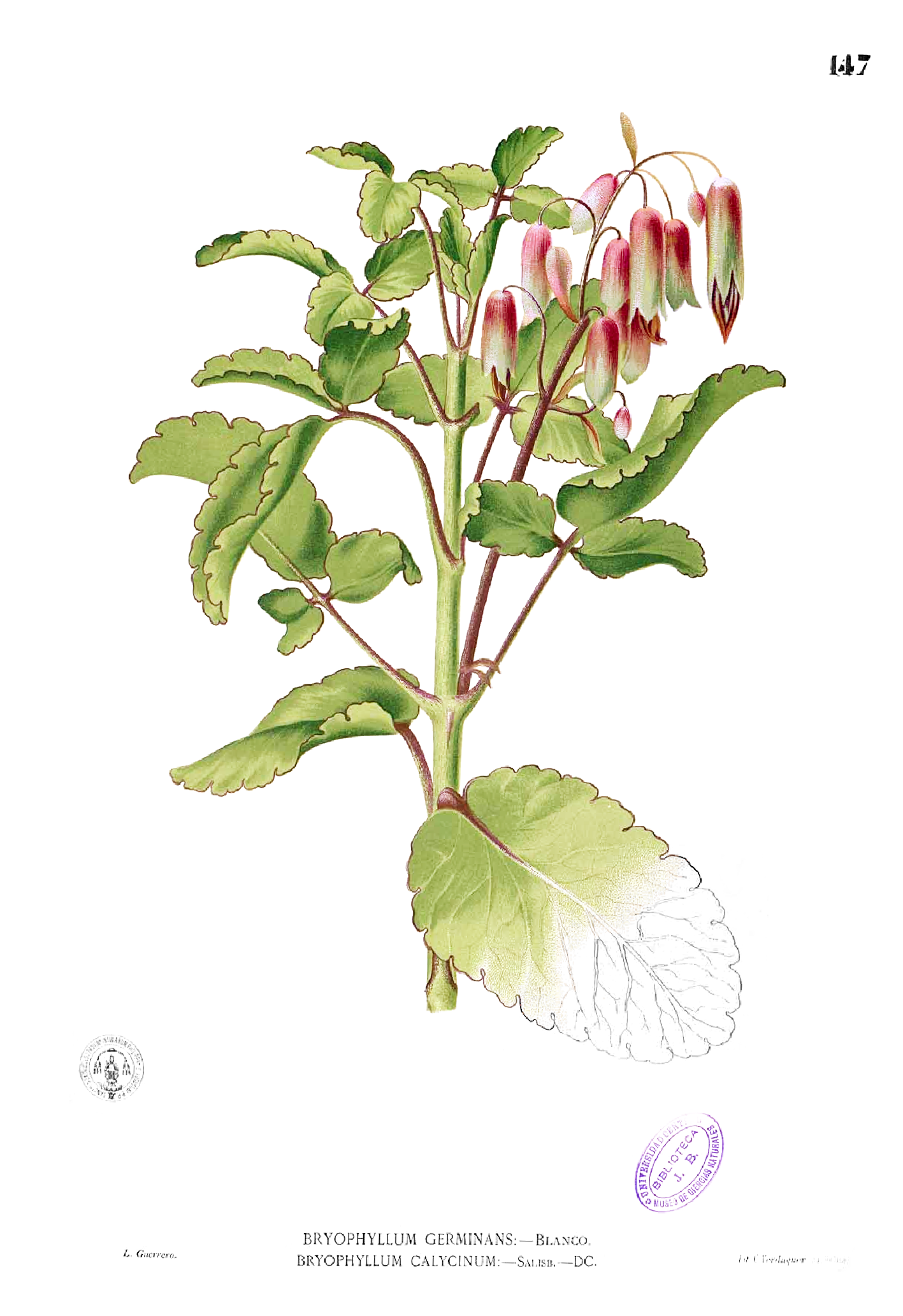
Bryophyllum pinnatum illustrated in Flora de Filipinas by Francisco Manuel Blanco (O.S.A.)

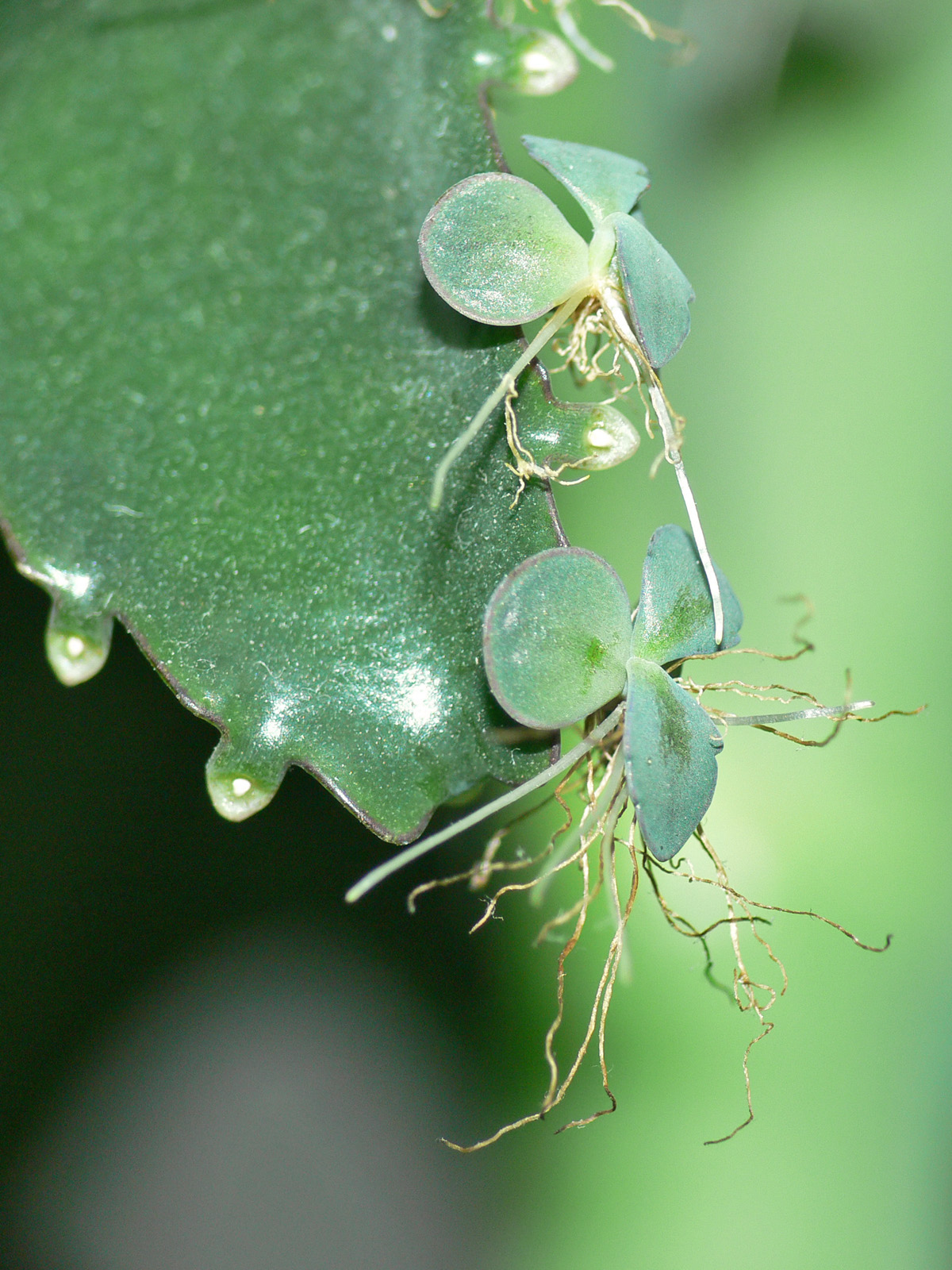
Vegetative reproduction

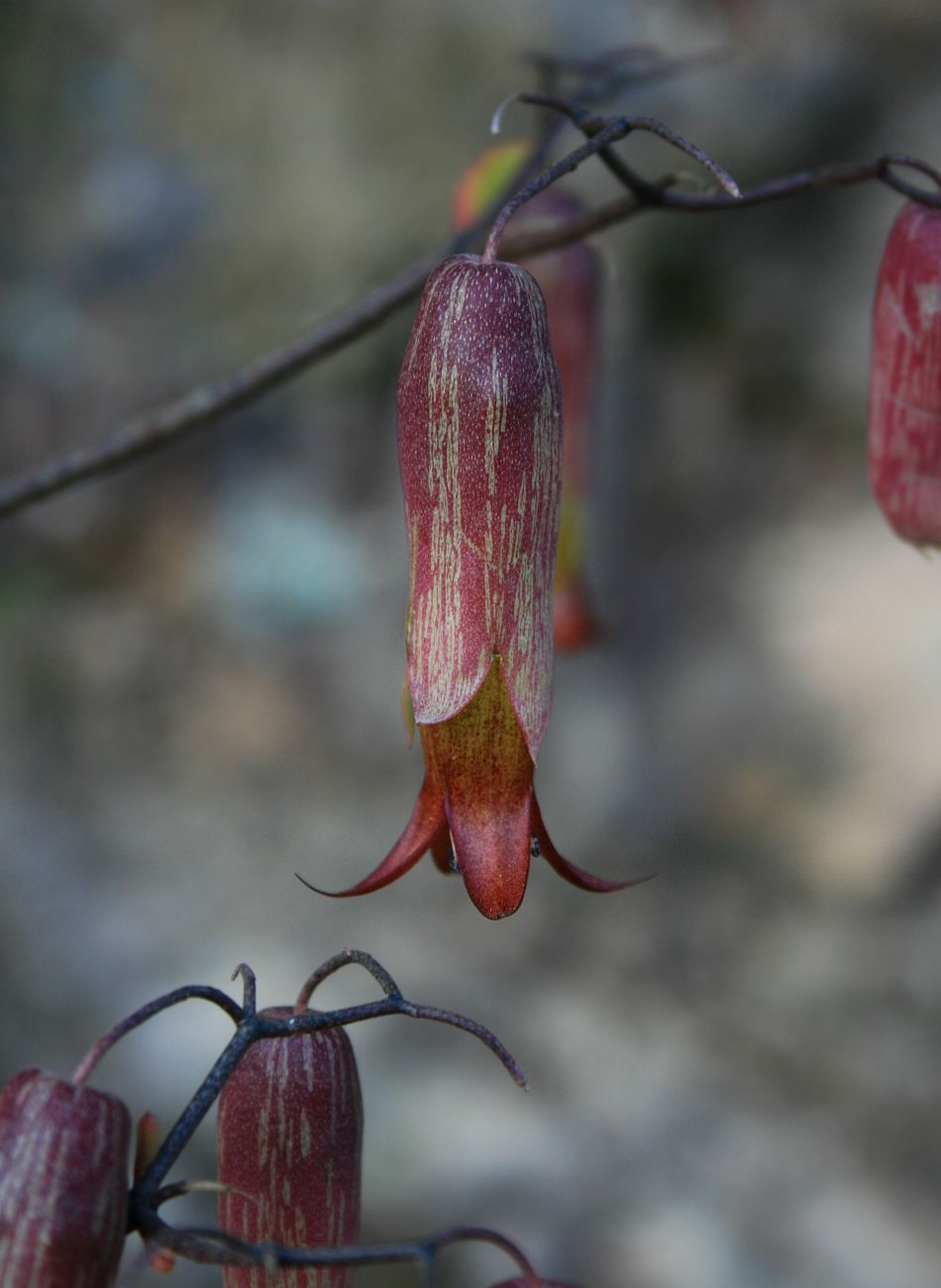
Closeup of flowers

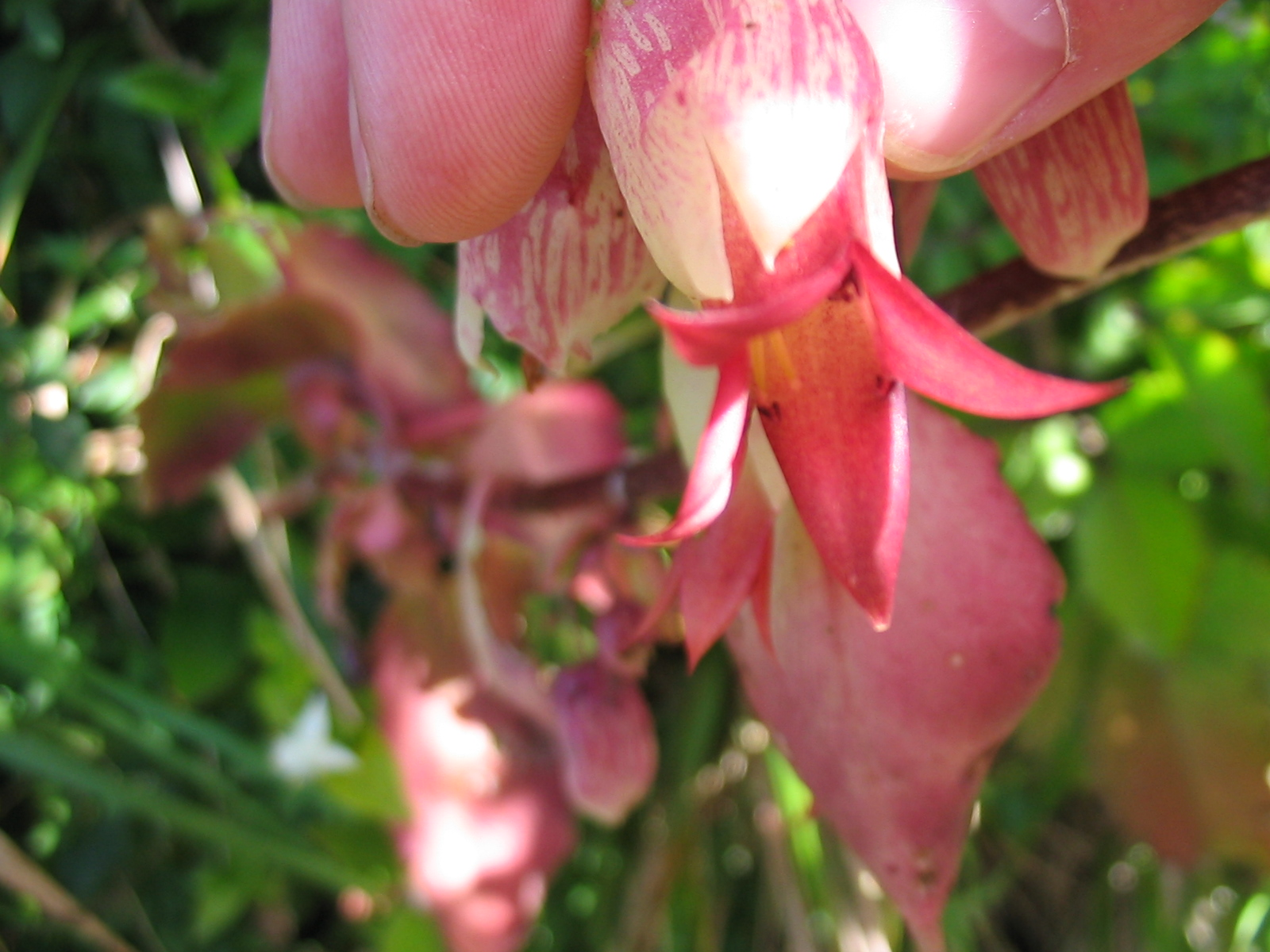
Flowers from underside

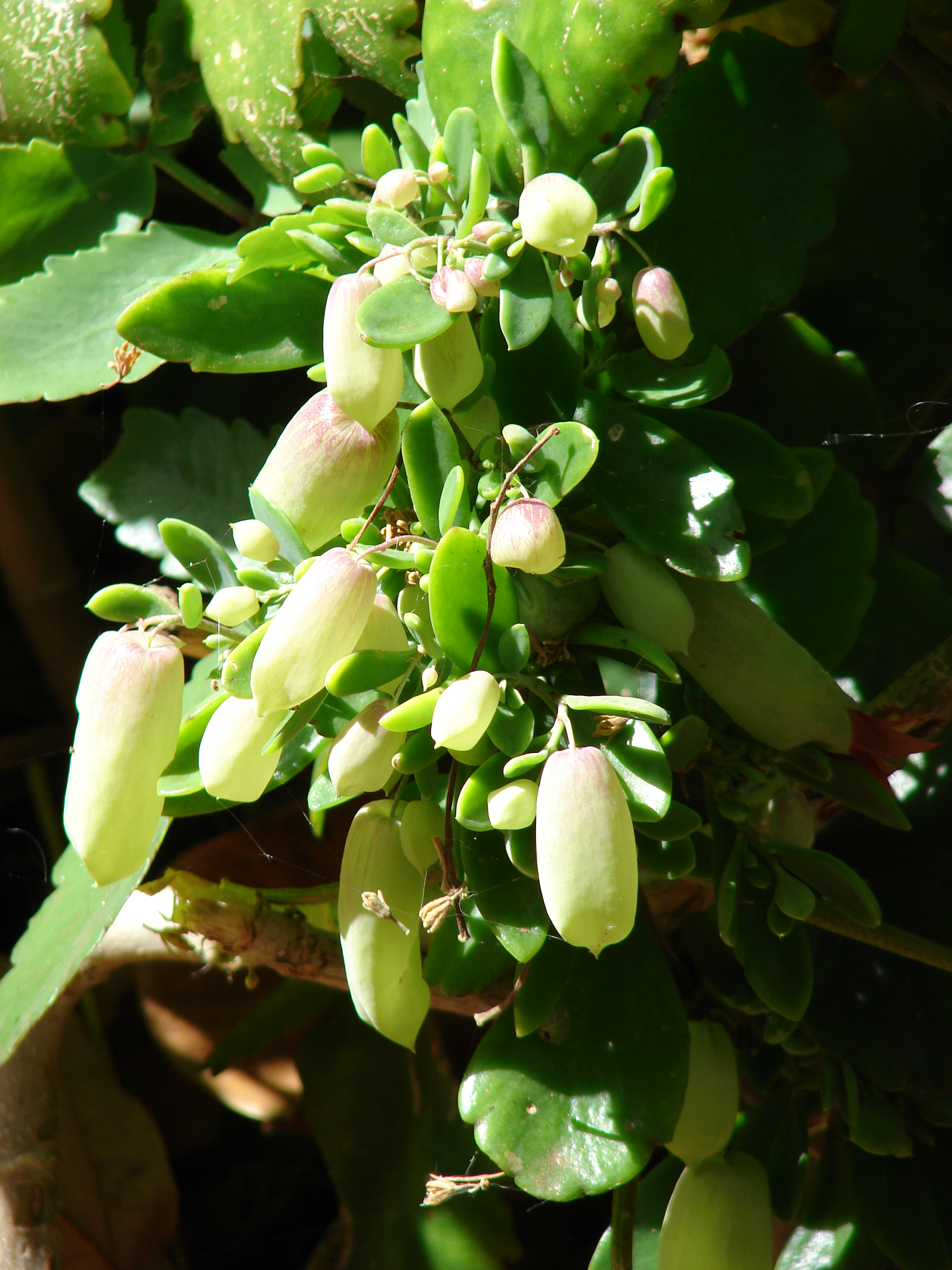
New flowers

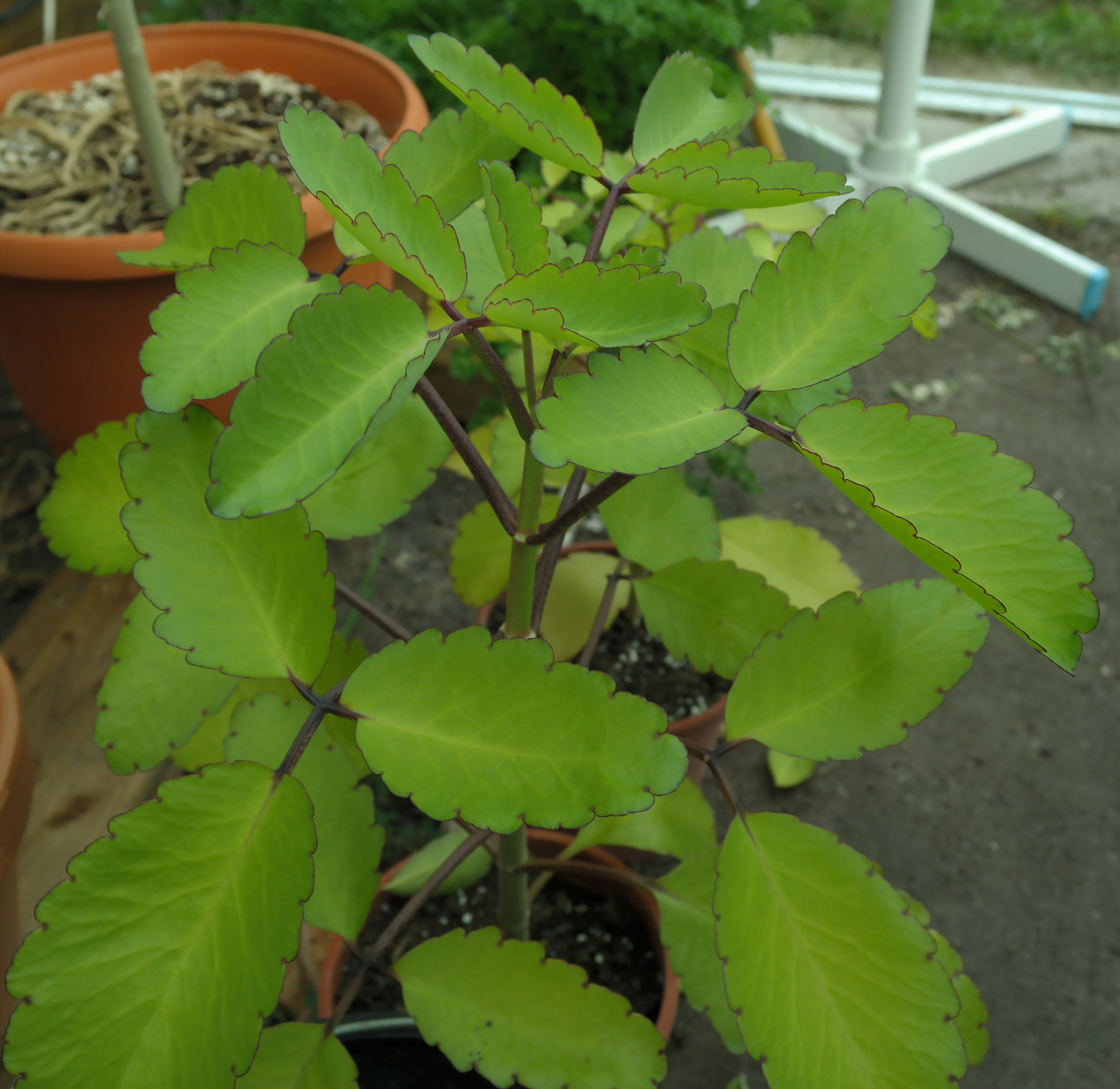
Foliage

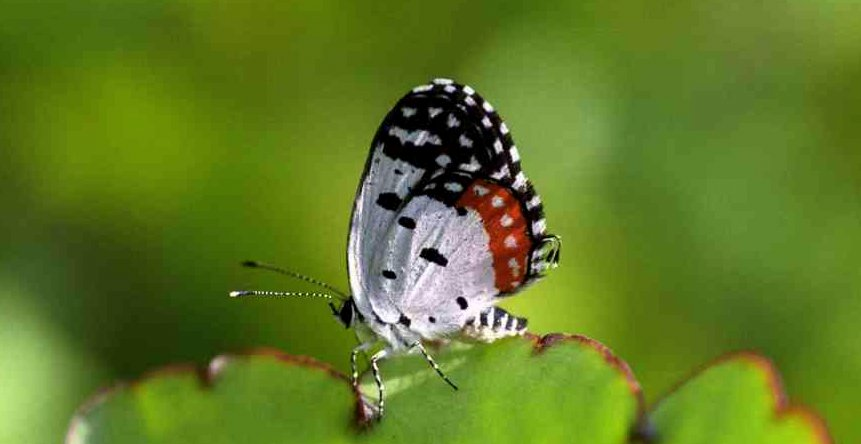
Red Pierrot butterfly is resting on edge of a leaf.

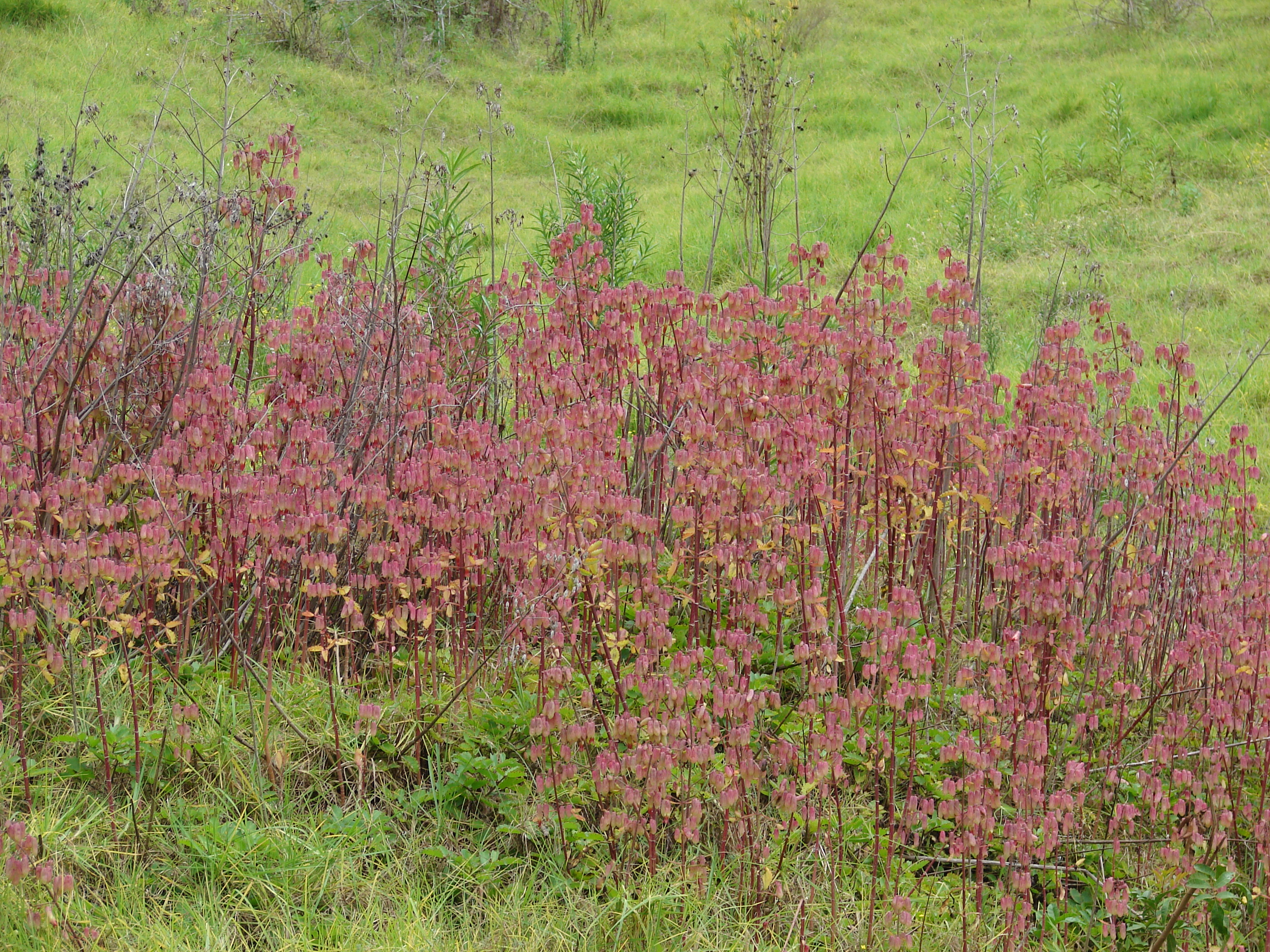
Bush setting

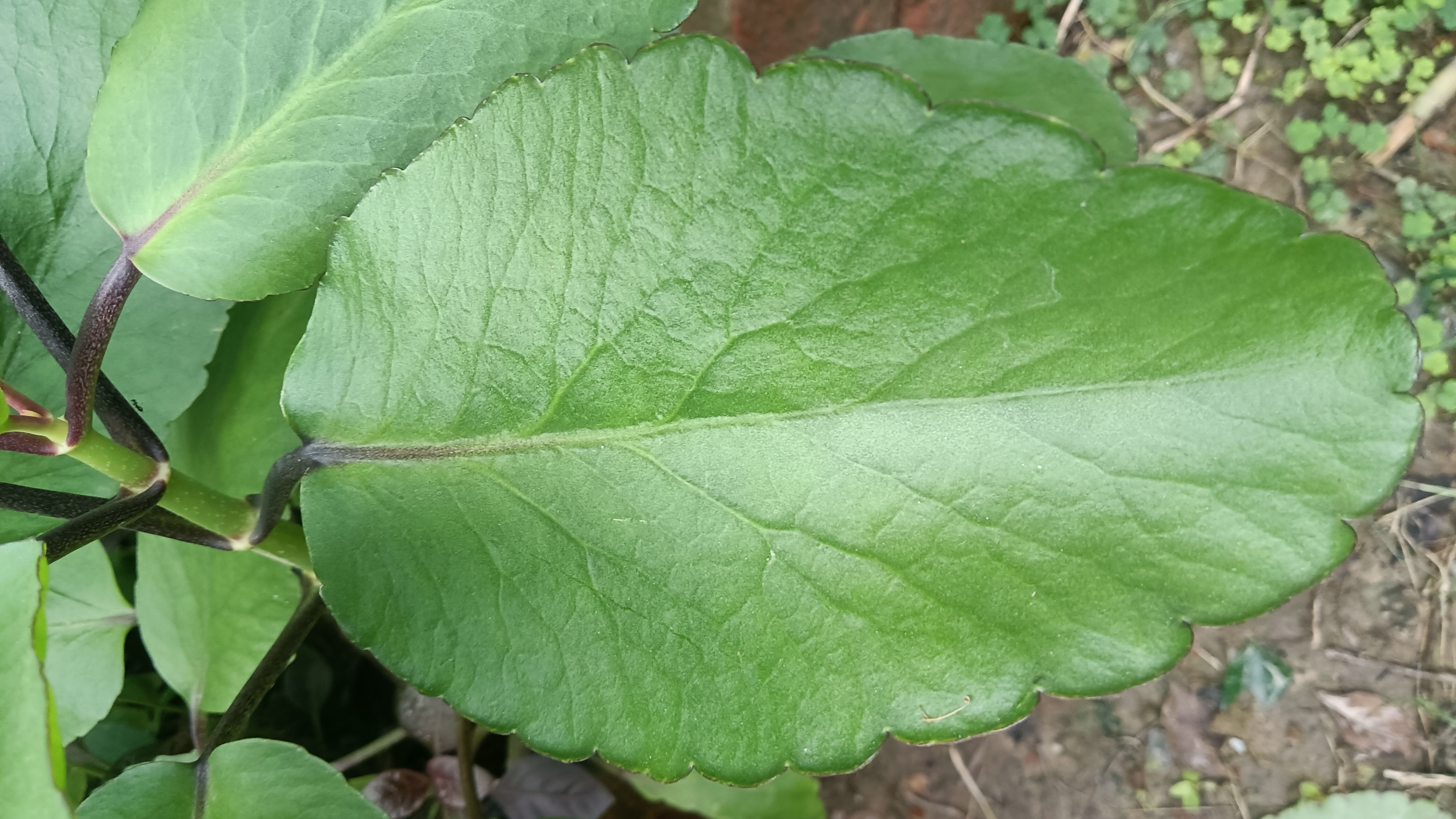
Kalanchoe pinnata leaf

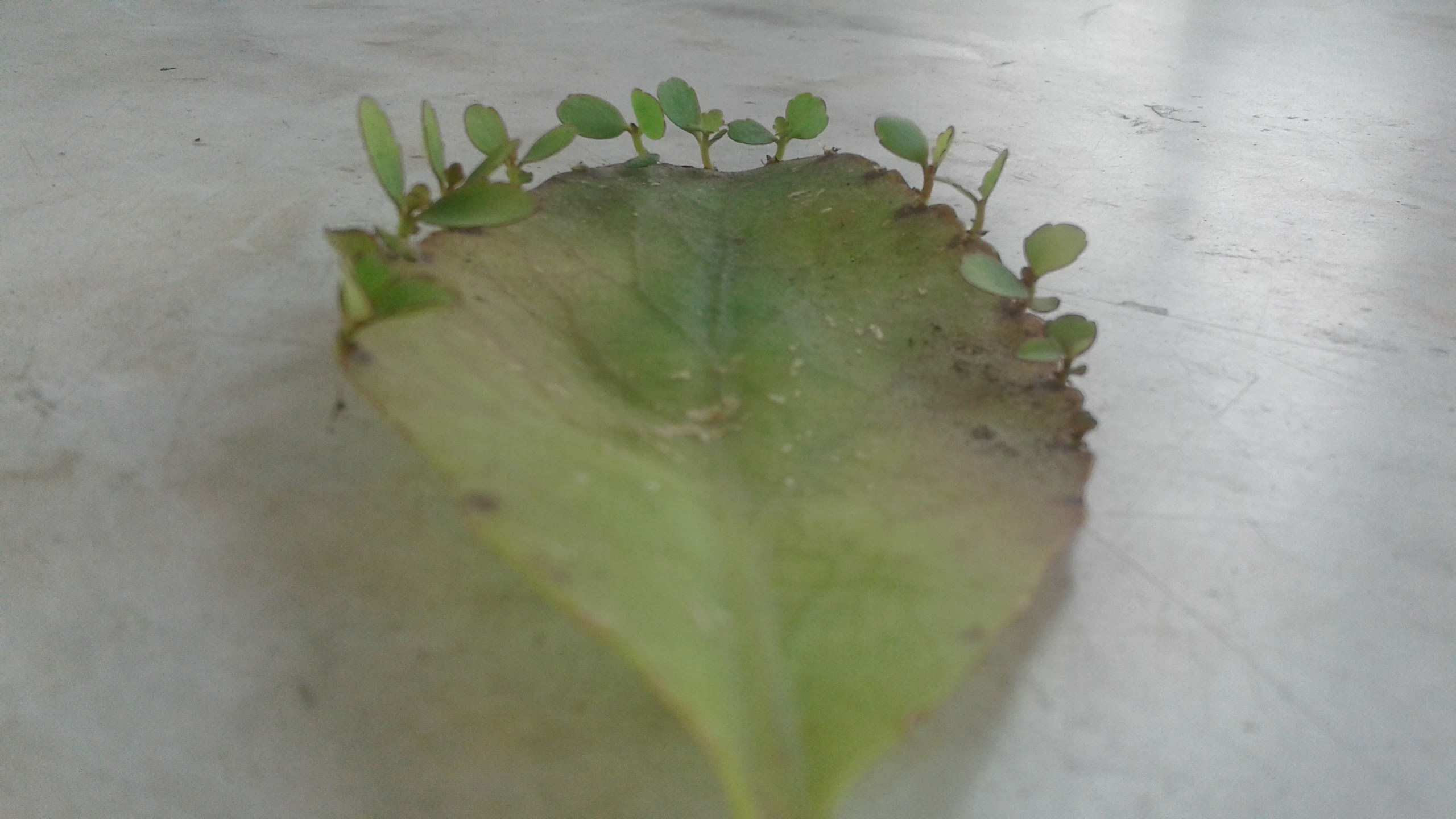
Vegetative Propagation
