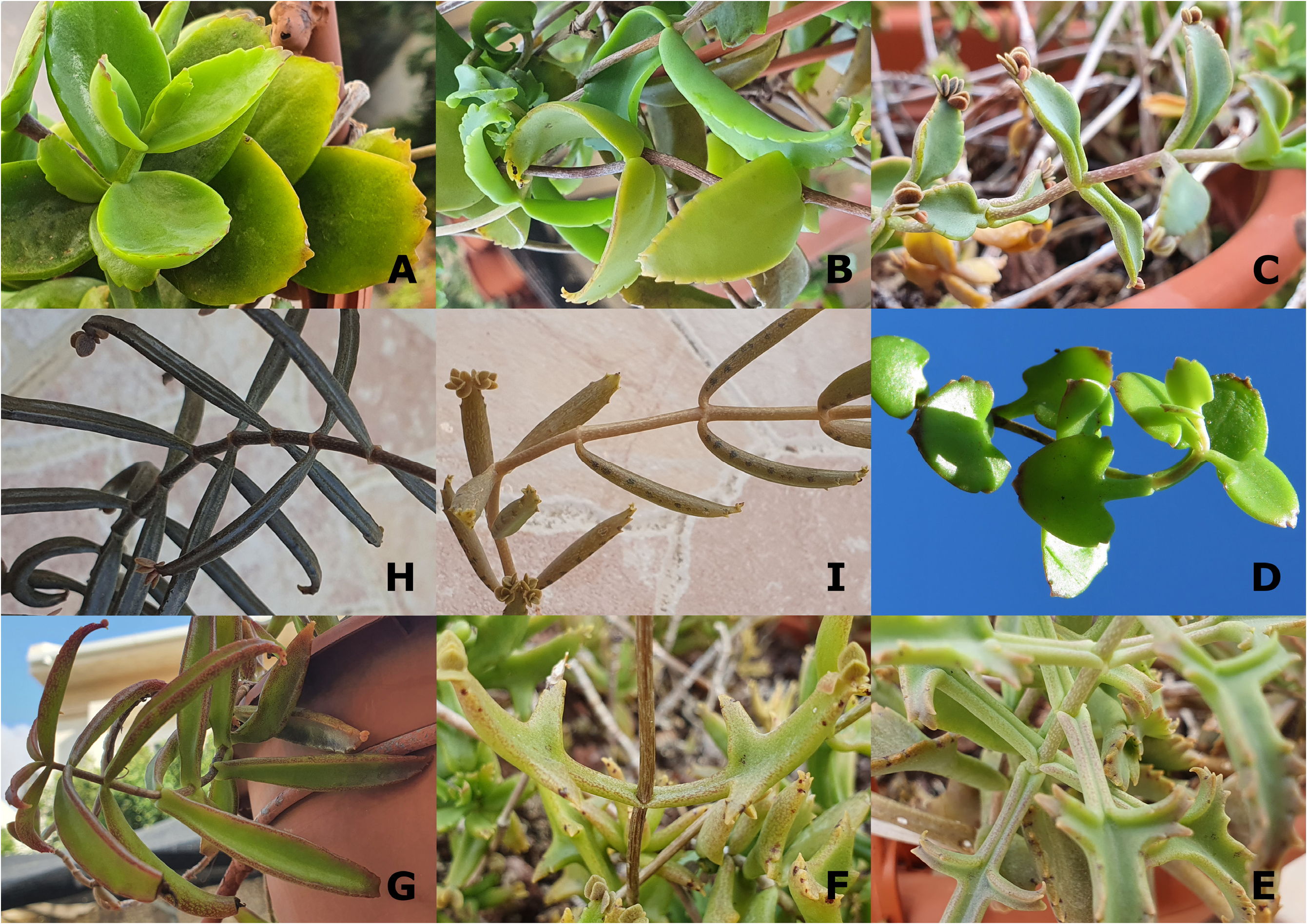
- (A–B) Kalanchoe costantinii; (C) K. beauverdii var. beauverdii; (D) K. beauverdii var. pertinax; (E–F) K. beauverdii var. juelii; (G) K. guignardii; (H) K. scandens; (I) K. ×rechingeri.

Scientific classification
- Kingdom: Plantae
- Clade: Tracheophytes
- Clade: Angiosperms
- Clade: Eudicots
- Order: Saxifragales
- Family: Crassulaceae
- Genus: Kalanchoe
- Subgenus: Bryophyllum
- Species: K. beauverdii

Binomial name
- Kalanchoe beauverdii Raym.-Hamet

Varieties
- Kalanchoe beauverdii var. beauverdii; Kalanchoe beauverdii var. juelii (Raym.-Hamet & H.Perrier) Gideon F.Sm. & Figueiredo; Kalanchoe beauverdii var. pertinax Shtein & Gideon F.Sm.

Synonyms
- Bryophyllum beauverdii (Raym.-Hamet) A.Berger; Bryophyllum juelii (Raym.-Hamet & H.Perrier) A.Berger; Kalanchoe beauverdii var. typica Boiteau & Mannoni; Kalanchoe juelii Raym.-Hamet & H.Perrier

= Kalanchoe beauverdii =

Species of flowering plant

Kalanchoe beauverdii, or Beauverd's widow's-thrill, is a climbing succulent species of Kalanchoe subg. Bryophyllum native to Madagascar. The species used to include many different forms with great variations. Now the broad-sense K. beauverdii has been treated as a series, Kalanchoe ser. Vilana, which includes four species: K. beauverdii, K. costantinii, K. guignardii, and K. scandens. The narrow-sense K. beauverdii differs from the other species of the series in its petiolate leaves.
