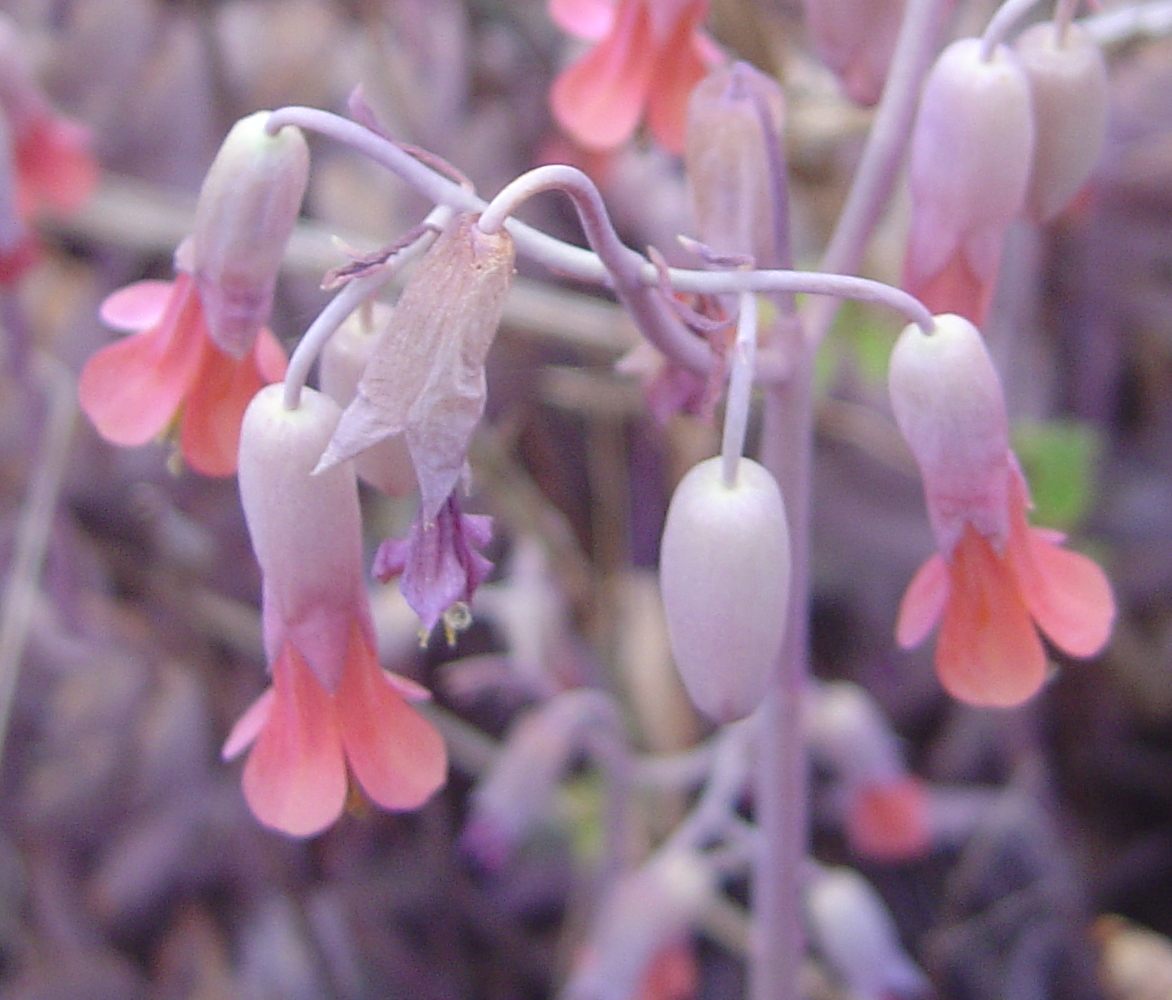
- Close-up of flowers
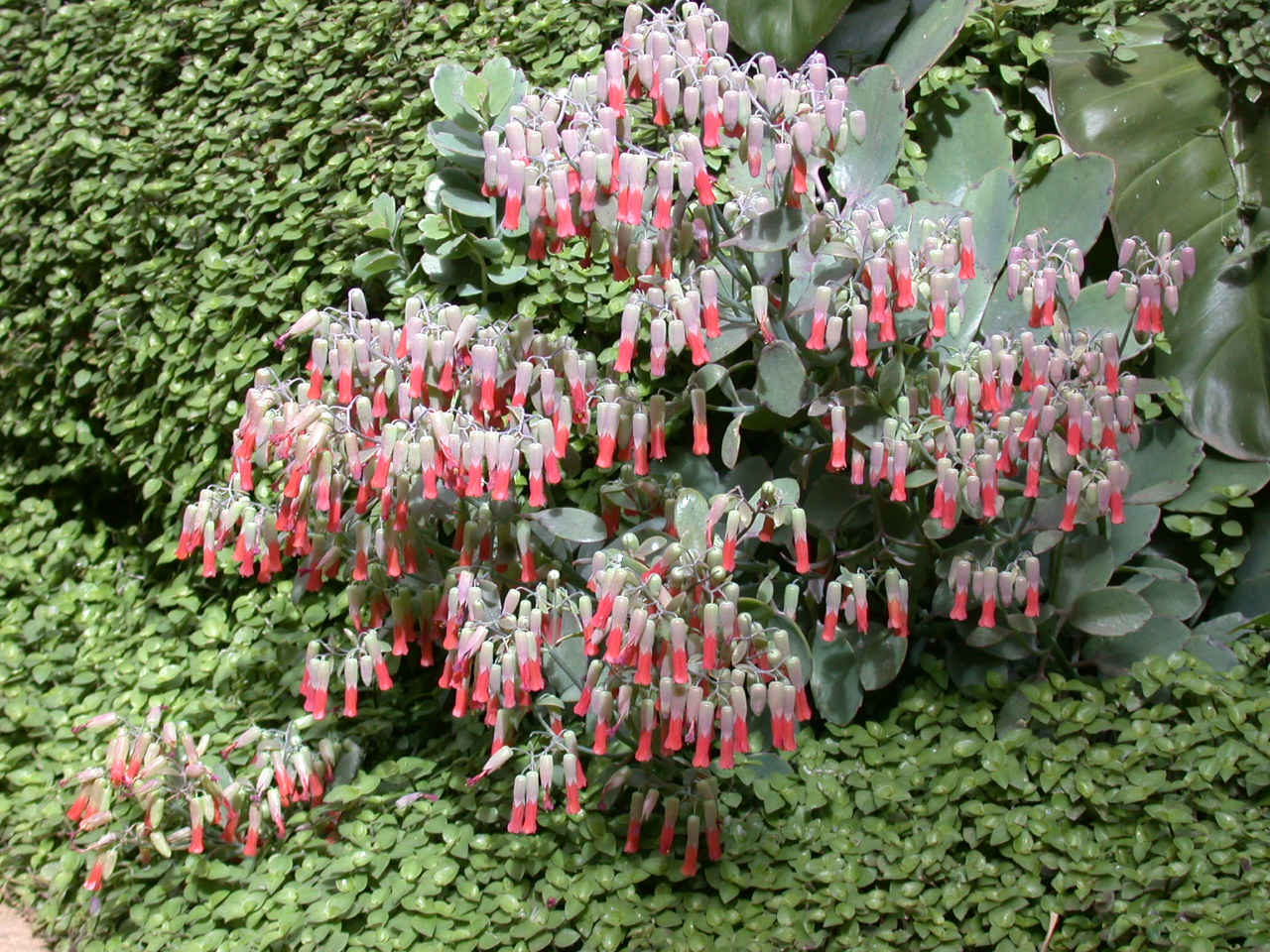
- Habit

Scientific classification
- Kingdom: Plantae
- Clade: Tracheophytes
- Clade: Angiosperms
- Clade: Eudicots
- Order: Saxifragales
- Family: Crassulaceae
- Genus: Kalanchoe
- Species: K. laxiflora

Binomial name
- Kalanchoe laxiflora Baker, 1887 - J. Linn. Soc., Bot. 22: 472

Synonyms
- Bryophyllum crenatum Baker; Bryophyllum laxiflorum (Baker) Govaerts; Kalanchoe crenata (Baker) Raym.-Hamet; Kalanchoe laxiflora subsp. stipitata Boiteau & Mannoni; Kalanchoe laxiflora subsp. subpeltata Boiteau & Mannoni; Kalanchoe laxiflora subsp. violacea Boiteau & Mannoni; Kalanchoe tieghemii Raym.-Hamet

= Kalanchoe laxiflora =

Species of plant

Kalanchoe laxiflora, the milky widow's thrill, is a species of perennial flowering plant in the family Crassulaceae. A succulent subshrub reaching 50 cm (20 in), it is typically found growing on rocks in deserts and dry shrublands.

It is native to east-central Madagascar, growing primarily in dry shrublands. As an ornamental plant, it has been introduced to many locales around the world, including Italy, Sicily, Morocco, Algeria, Zimbabwe, Mauritius, Réunion, Hawaii, the Leeward Islands, the northern Andes, and Brazil. It is becoming widely invasive as a garden escapee.

== Morphology ==
It is a low-growing succulent, often sprouting new branches near the base of the stem, gradually forming a shrub-like appearance.

The leaves are opposite and descussate. Each leaf is obovate to orbicular, bluish green in color, with crenate margins which may have a brownish tu purplish coloration. Auricles are visible at the base of leaves.

The inflorescenes are dense corymbiform cymes. Flowers are tubular, calyx ranging from green to violet, petals typically rose-red to orange.

It is often confused with Kalanchoe fedtschenkoi, since both can be alike in appearance. K. laxiflora typically has deeper sinuses at the margins, and grows upright; while K. fedtschenkoi tend to bend to the ground, forming a sprawling shape. In addition, K. fedtschenkoi does not have visible auricles.
