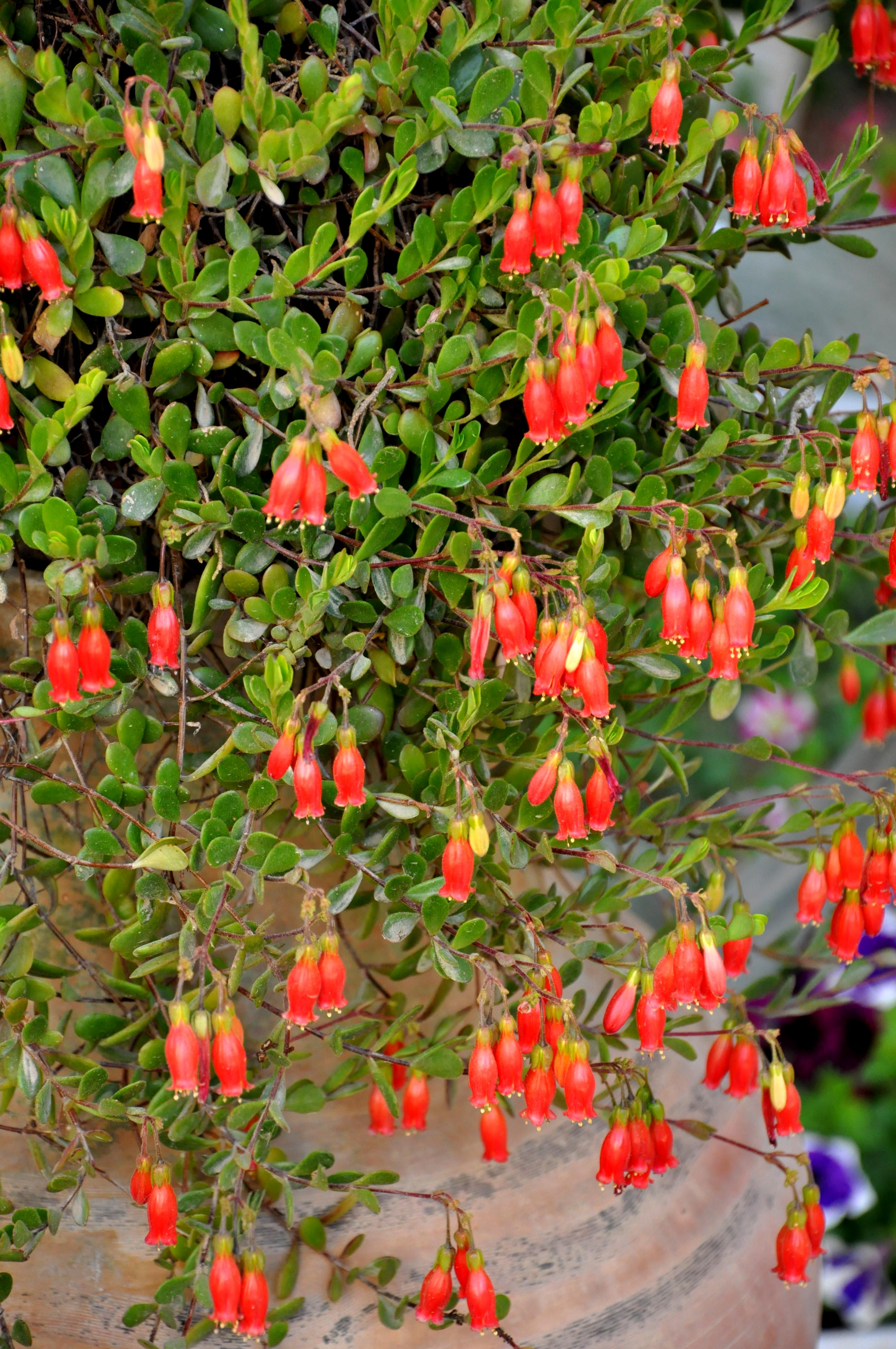

Scientific classification
- Kingdom: Plantae
- Clade: Tracheophytes
- Clade: Angiosperms
- Clade: Eudicots
- Order: Saxifragales
- Family: Crassulaceae
- Genus: Kalanchoe
- Species: K. manginii

Binomial name
- Kalanchoe manginii Raym.-Hamet & H.Perrier

Synonyms
- Bryophyllum manginii (R.-Hamet & H. Perrier) Nothdurft; Kalanchoe manginii var. triploidea Mannoni & Boiteau

= Kalanchoe manginii =

Species of succulent

Kalanchoe manginii, beach bells, is a species of flowering plant in the family Crassulaceae, native to Madagascar.

== Description ==
It is an evergreen succulent perennial growing to 30 cm (12 in) tall and wide, with arching branches of rounded, glossy leaves, and urn-shaped salmon-red flowers in spring. The numerous, slender, woody, prostrate shoots are clustered. The end of the shoots is upright. The non-flowering shoots are covered in downy hairs and have glands, whereas flowering shoots are bare.

The sessile, very succulent leaves are up to 8 millimeters thick, bare to tiny, downy hairs, green, obovate to oblong circular and 1 to 3 centimeters long and 0.6 to 1.5 centimeters wide. The leaf tip is very blunt, narrowed at the base and does not enclose the stem. The leaf edge is entire or slightly notched in the upper part.

=== Inflorescence ===
The inflorescence is a loose, few-flowered panicle with brood buds, which appear from late winter to early spring. The hanging flowers sit on 0.7 to 1 centimeter long flower stalks. The green to greenish-red calyx tube is 0.4 to 0.8 millimeters long and ends in egg-shaped, pointed tips that are 6.5 to 9 millimeters long and 2.4 to 3.5 millimeters wide. The corolla is urn-shaped, red-orange to bright red.

The 20 to 25 millimeter long corolla tube has egg-shaped tips with attached tips that are 3.5 to 4.5 millimeters long and 4.5 to 5 millimeters wide. The stamens are attached near the base of the corolla tube and all protrude from the corolla tube. The anthers are kidney-shaped and about 1.6 millimeters long. The linear nectar scales are 1.8 millimeters long and wide. The style is between 14 and 17 millimeters long.

== Cultivation ==
As the minimum temperature for growth is 10 °C (50 °F), in temperate regions this plant must be grown under glass as a houseplant. This plant has gained the Royal Horticultural Society's Award of Garden Merit.

== Gallery ==
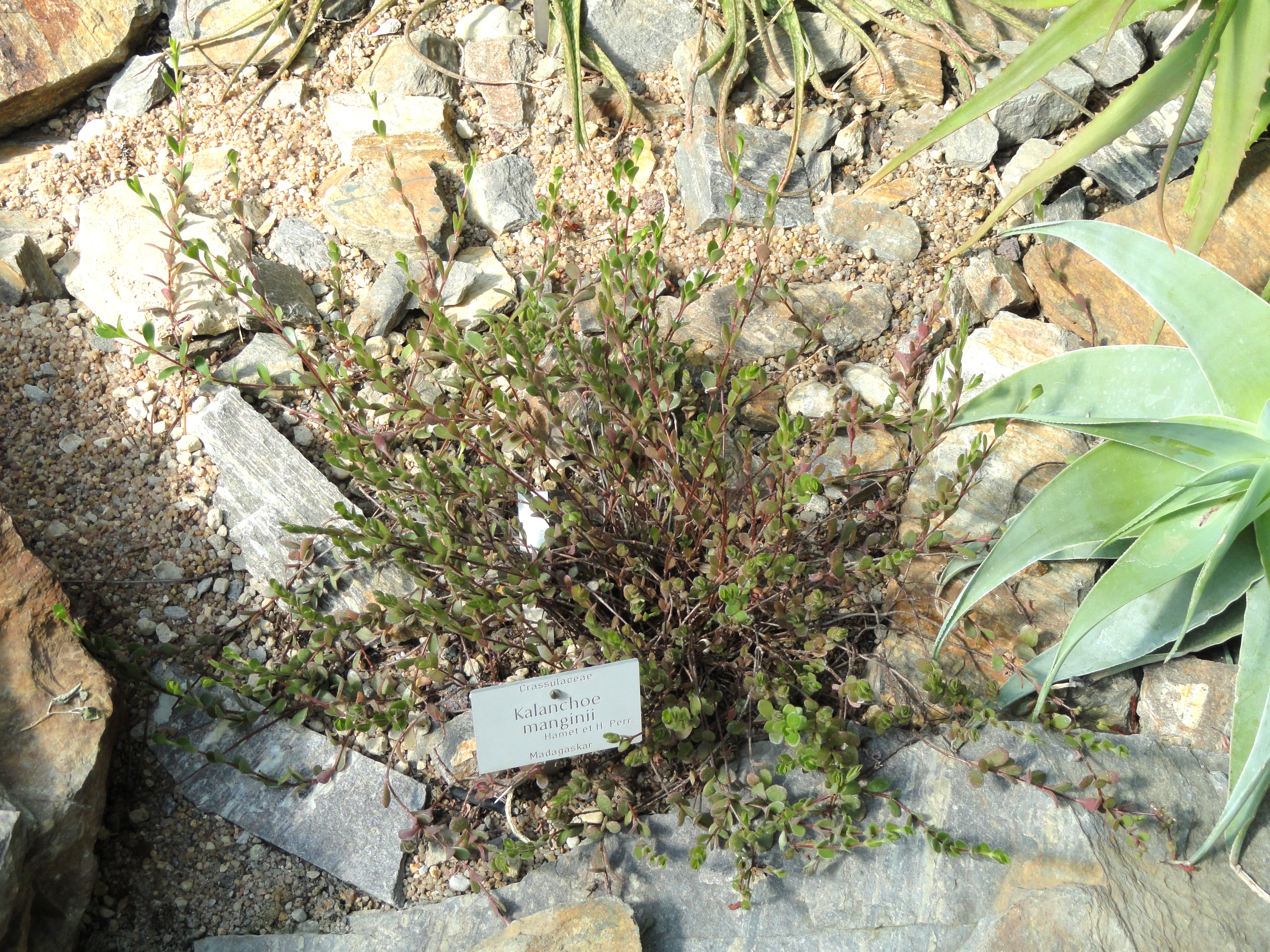
Plant

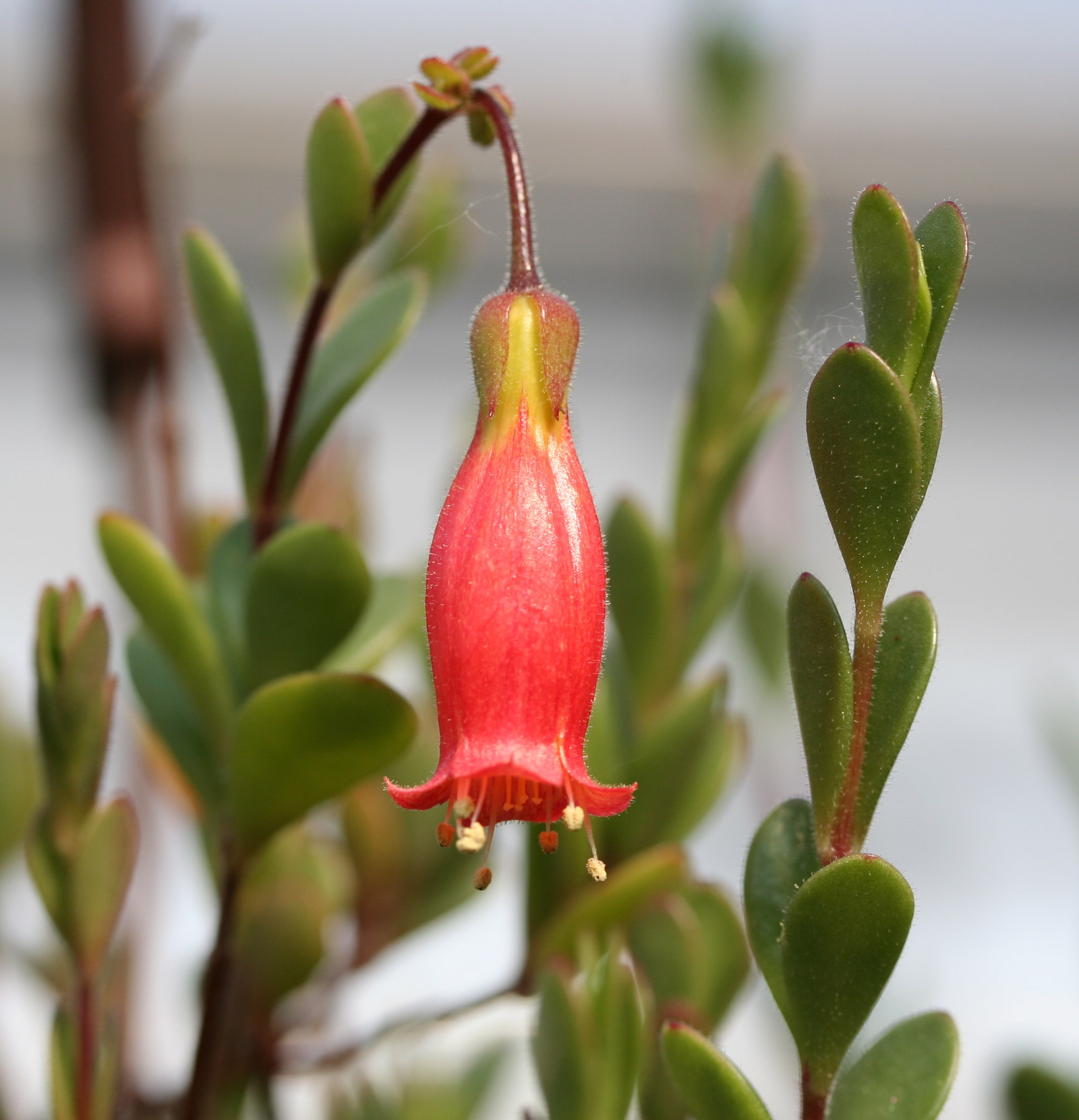
Flowers and leaves

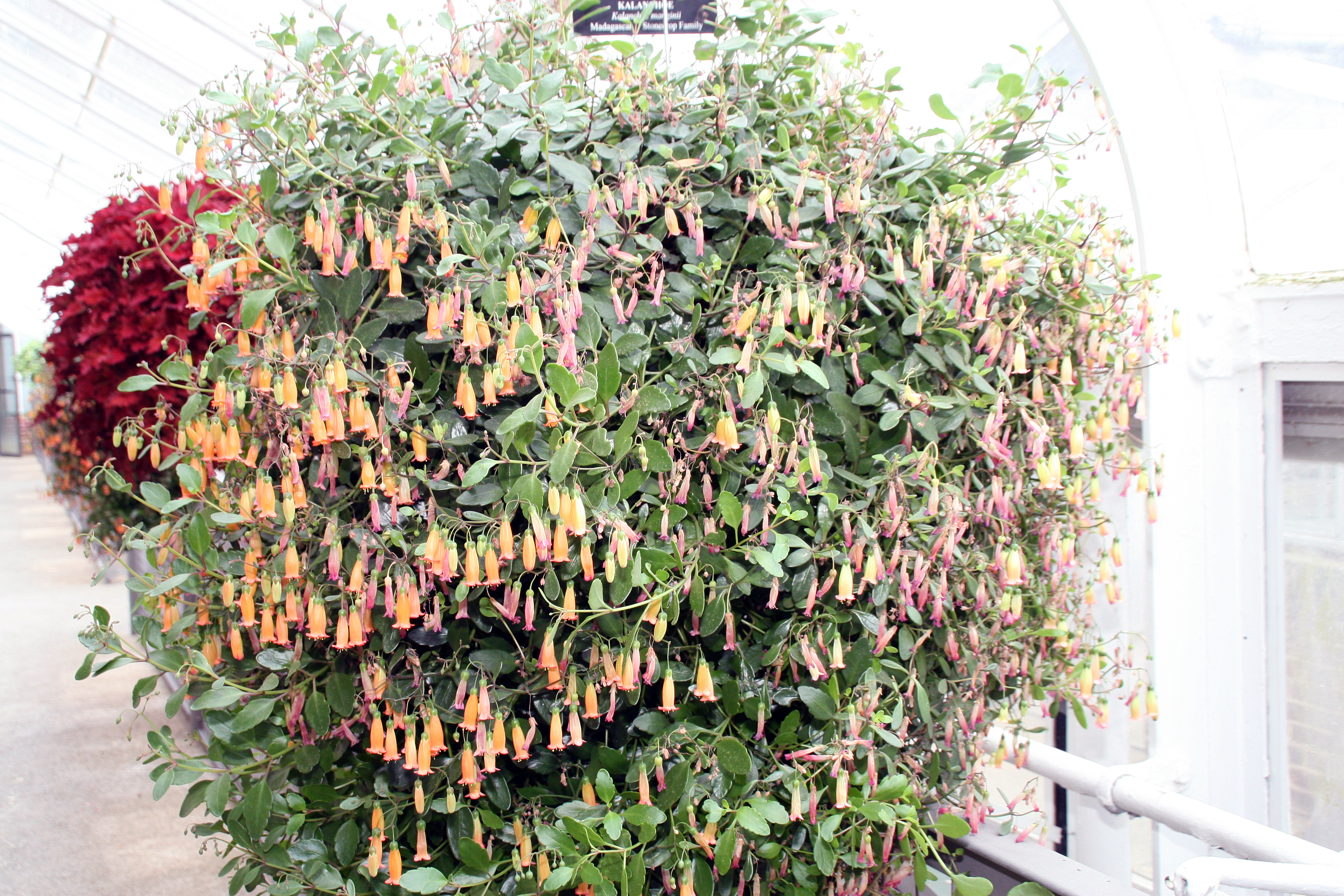
K. gracilipes × K. manginii

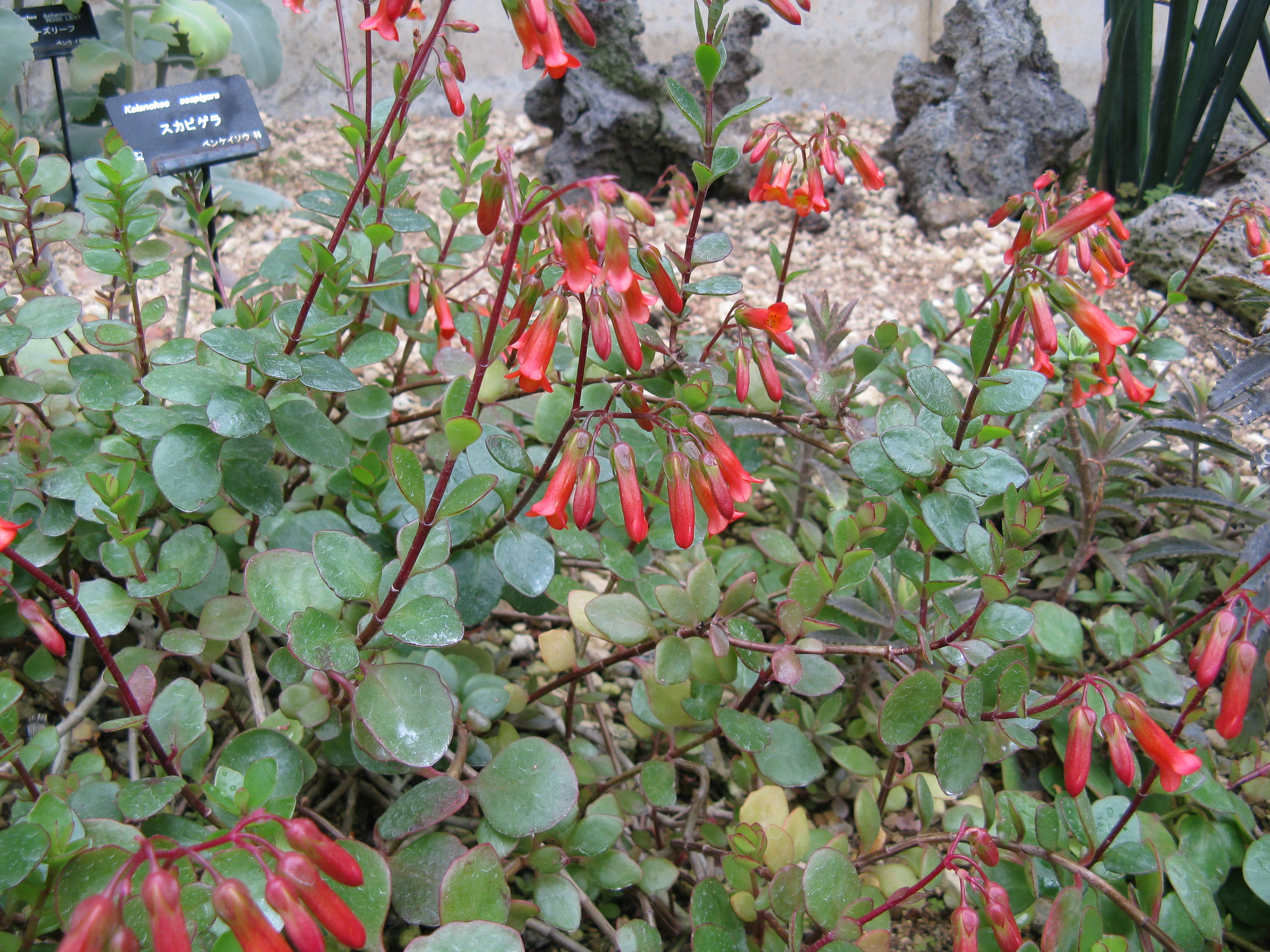
K. blossfeldiana × K. manginii
