= Kalanchoe × richaudii =

- In cultivation

Scientific classification
- Kingdom: Plantae
- Clade: Tracheophytes
- Clade: Angiosperms
- Clade: Eudicots
- Order: Saxifragales
- Family: Crassulaceae
- Genus: Kalanchoe
- Species: K. × richaudii

Binomial name
- Kalanchoe × richaudii Desc.

Hybrid species of flowering plant

Kalanchoe × richaudii is a natural hybrid between the Kalanchoe species Kalanchoe delagoensis and Kalanchoe rosei. It is a perennial succulent subshrub native to south-east Madagascar, typically found in dry climates.

== Morphology ==
Kalanchoe × richaudii has a simple erect stem, with multiple fleshy, light green to yellowish green leaves, marbled with dark spots near the edges. Leaves are opposite and decussate; each leaf is elongated and V-shaped in cross-section with serrated edges, without auricles at the base.

The inflorescences are terminal and corymbose, branches held well above the foliage, forming a candelabra-like shape. Flowers are tubular, with five petals which are typically reddish to orange-pink. The calyx is violet in color.

== Etymology ==
The hybrid was named after Philippe Richaud, a French explorer of Madagascar's xerophytic vegetation. He brought this plant to the attention of Bernard Descoings.
