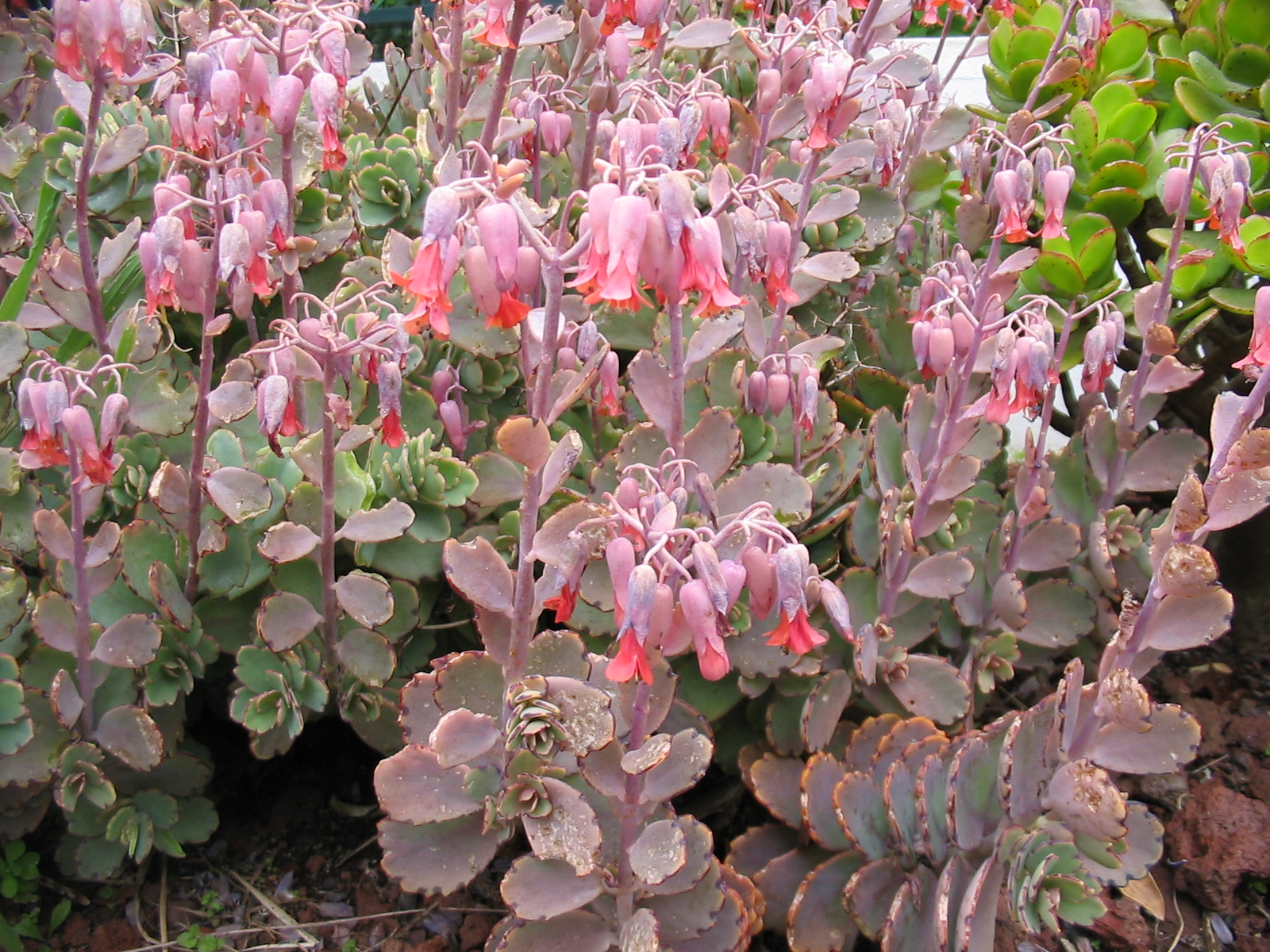

Scientific classification
- Kingdom: Plantae
- Clade: Embryophytes
- Clade: Tracheophytes
- Clade: Angiosperms
- Clade: Eudicots
- Order: Saxifragales
- Family: Crassulaceae
- Genus: Kalanchoe
- Species: K. fedtschenkoi

Binomial name
- Kalanchoe fedtschenkoi Raym.-Hamet & H.Perrier

Synonyms
- Bryophyllum fedtschenkoi (Raym.-Hamet & H.Perrier) Lauz.-March.

= Kalanchoe fedtschenkoi =

Species of succulent

Kalanchoe fedtschenkoi, formerly known as Bryophyllum fedtschenkoi, is a species of flowering plant in the family Crassulaceae. It is native to Madagascar. It is widely sold as a house or garden plant that has established itself in the wild in some southern parts of the United States of America. The specific epithet fedtschenkoi honors botanist Boris Fedtschenko (1873-1947). Its genome has been sequenced as a model to study CAM metabolism.

== Description ==
Kalanchoe fedtschenkoi is a low-growing, frost-tender perennial succulent which prefers dry, open ground. It grows to 10–12 inches (25–30 cm) tall as an untidy, low, rounded herb. The stems are round, smooth and lax with visible leaf scars, often bending and touching the ground where they produce roots and new plants.

Leaves are fleshy, alternate, blue-green and oval or obovate with fine scalloped edges, the edges may turn pink or red under strong sunlight or drought conditions. Commonly called ‘Lavender Scallops’ from the shape and color of its leaves. Notably, the leaf surfaces exhibit water-repellent, self-cleaning properties that help protect the plant from insects and environmental pollutants. This behavior arises from a nanostructured, waxy surface architecture that imparts extremely low wettability, rendering the leaves superhydrophobic.

=== Inflorescences ===
The tubular flowers are in corymbs, often multi-layered in good conditions. Each flower has a short calyx edged with delta-shaped segments, which is shorter than its tubular corolla. The corolla is an orange/coral/apricot color. The flowers are pendant.
