= Garware =

Garware may refer to:

== People ==
- Abasaheb Garware
- Shashikant Garware

== Other ==
- Abasaheb Garware College
- MES Garware College of Commerce
- Garware Plastics and Polyester v. Telelink
- Garware College metro station
