= Maharashtra Education Society =

Educational society based in Pune, India

- महाराष्ट्र एज्युकेशन सोसायटी
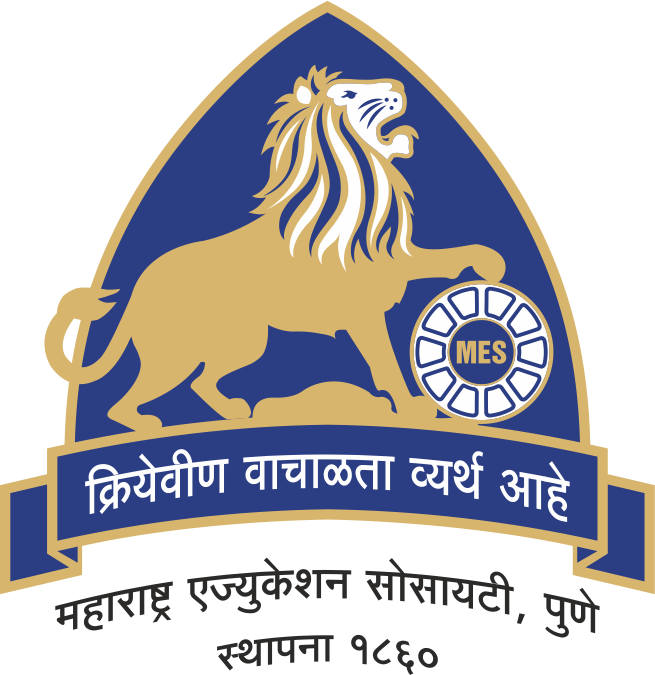
- Formation: 1860
- Headquarters: Pune, Maharashtra
- Location: India
- Website: mespune.in

The Maharashtra Education Society (MES) is one of the oldest private education institutions in Pune, India. It was founded in 1860 as the Poona Native Institution by Waman Prabhakar Bhave, Laxman Nahar Indapurkar, and the revolutionary leader Vasudeo Balwant Phadke.

At present the society runs over 77 institutions including schools, colleges, vocational training institutions and a hospital in various towns and cities in Western Maharashtra such as Saswad, Baramati, Panvel, Belapur, Kalamboli, Shirwal, Kasar Amboli, Navi Mumbai, Ahmednagar, Pune and Chiplun.

== Institutions run by the society ==
=== Schools ===
- MES Boys' High School, Pune (Bhave School, Pune)
- Adyakrantiveer Vasudev Balvant Phadke Vidyalaya, Panvel
- Bal Vikas Mandir, Saswad
- Bal Shikshan Mandir, Pune
- Dnyan Mandir, Kalmboli
- Kei (Late) D.S. Renavikar Vidya Mandir, AhmedNagar
- MES Adyakrantiveer Vasudev Balwant Phadke Vidyalaya, English Medium Primary
- MES English Medium School, Baramati
- MES English Medium school, Shirwal
- MES English Medium High School, Shirwal
- MES Late Gajanan Bhivrao Deshpande Vidyalaya, Baramati (MES Highschool)
- MES Public School, High School (CBSE), Kalamboli
- Pre Primary School, Ahmednagar
- Pre Primary School, Baramati
- Pre Primary School, Pune
- Pre Primary School, Saswad
- Pre Primary School, Shirwal
- Pre-Primary School, Savedi
- Public School, Pre-Primary School (CBSE), Kalamboli
- Rani Laxmibai Mulinchi Sainiki Shala, Kasar Amboli
- Renavikar Madhyamik Vidyalaya, Ahmednagar
- Renuka Swarup Memorial Girls Highschool
- Sau Nirmala Haribhau Deshpande, Primary School
- Shishu Mandir, Pune
- Vidya Mandir, Belapur
- Vimlabai Garware High school, Pune
- Waghire Vidyalaya, Saswad

=== Colleges ===
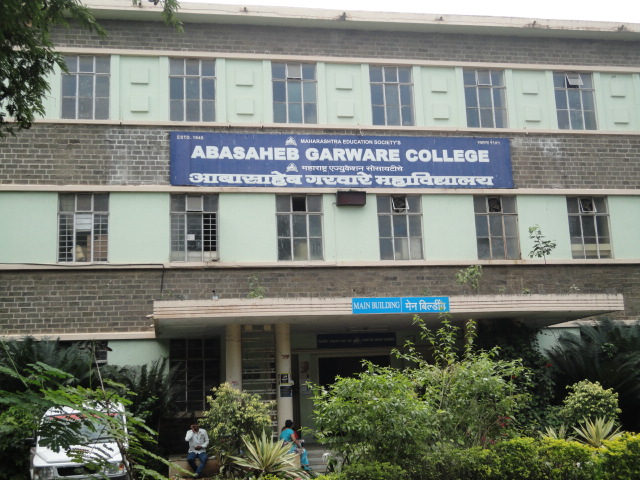
Abasaheb Garware College

- Abasaheb Garware College, Pune
- Ayurved Mahavidyalay in Khed, Ratnagiri
- Bhave High School (also has a Junior College)
- Community College of Indira Gandhi National Open University (associate branch)
- Garware College of Commerce, Pune
- Institute of Management and Career Courses, Pune
- MES Higher Secondary School, Junior College, Belapur
- MES Higher Secondary School, Junior College, Kothrud
- MES Late Gajananrao Bhivrao Deshpande Vidyalaya, Junior College, Baramati
- MES School Of Nursing and Junior College
- Night College Of Arts and Commerce
- Rani Laxmibai Mulinchi Sainiki Shala and Junior College
- Renuka Swarup Memorial Girls High School and Junior College
- Sou Vimalabai Garware Highschool and Junior College
- Waghire Vidyala and Junior College, Saswad
- MES Senior College, Pune

==== Medical Colleges ====
- College of Nursing in Khed, Ratnagiri
- College of Optometry in association with Yashwantrao Chavan Maharashtra Open University
- School of paramedical Science

=== Hospital ===
- Parshuram Hospital And Research Centre, Chiplun.

=== Others ===
- Academy for Career Excellence
- Centre For Resources And Strategic Planning
- College Hostel
- Deen Dayal Upadhyay Kaushal Kendra
- Krida Vardhini
- MES Auditorium
- Medical College Hostel
- Personality Development Center
- Renuka Swaroop Institute Of Career Courses
- Saraswati Niwas
- Shakti Gymnasium
- Shikshan Prabodhini
- Shooting Range

== See also ==
- Deccan Education Society
