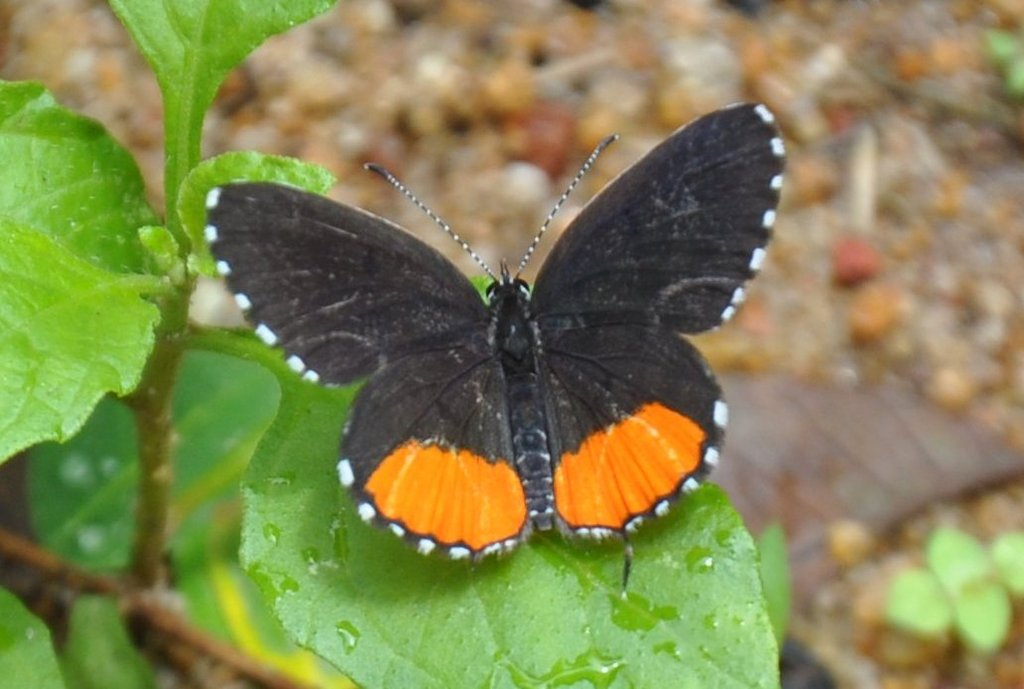

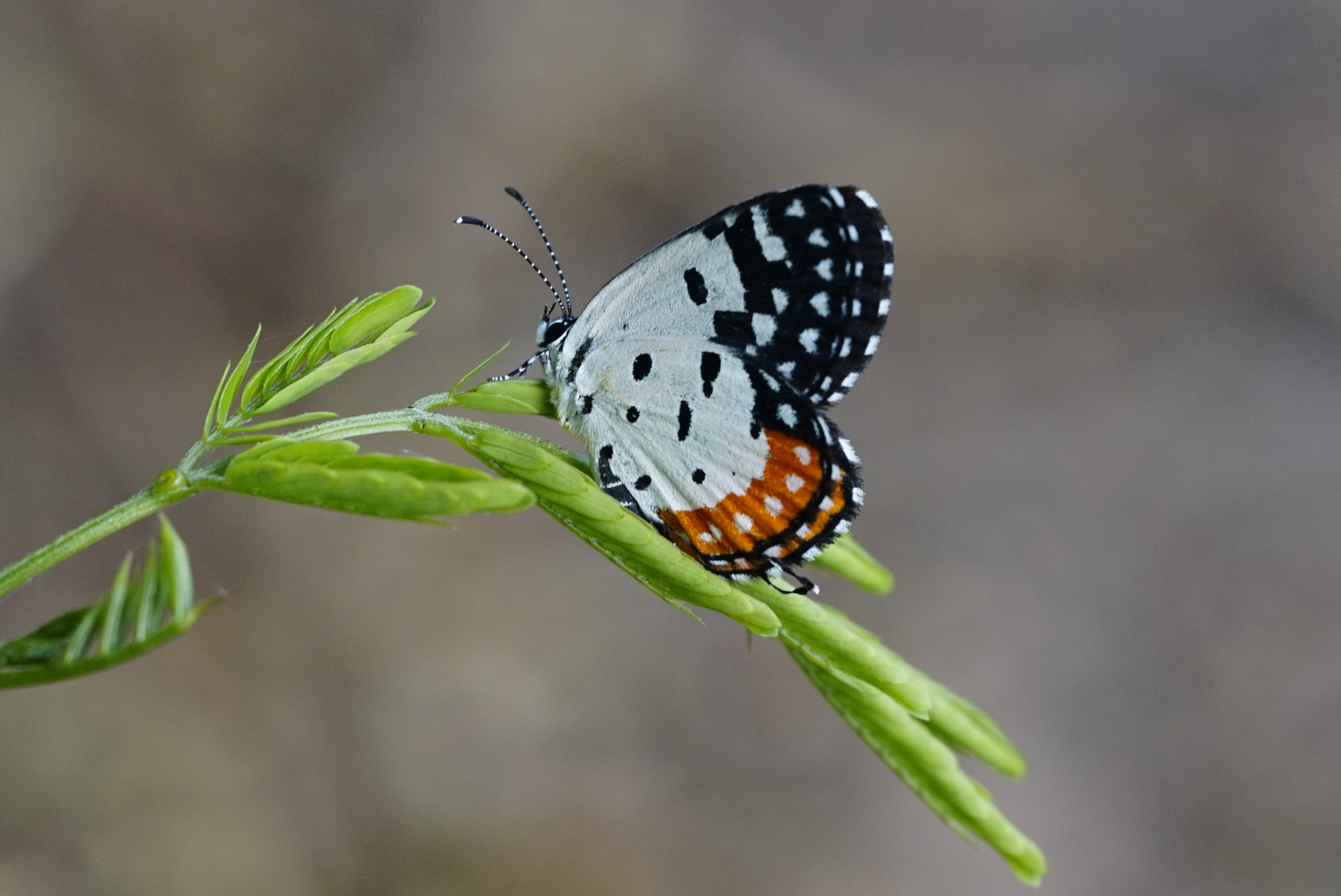

Scientific classification
- Kingdom: Animalia
- Phylum: Arthropoda
- Clade: Pancrustacea
- Class: Insecta
- Order: Lepidoptera
- Family: Lycaenidae
- Genus: Talicada
- Species: T. nyseus

Binomial name
- Talicada nyseus (Guerin, 1843)

= Talicada nyseus =

Red Pierrot

Species of butterfly

Talicada nyseus, the red Pierrot, is a small but striking butterfly found in the Indian subcontinent and South-East Asia belonging to the lycaenids, or blues family. The red Pierrots, often found perching on its larva host plant, Kalanchoe, are usually noticed due to their striking patterns and colors.

== Description ==
The butterfly has a wingspan of 3 to 3.5 cm. The upperside of its wings are black except for a large orange portion of the lower edge of the hindwing.

On the underside, the forewing is white with black spots more toward the margin. The hindwing is very striking, it is white with black spots toward the base and the margin has a wide band of orange with white spots. There is a lot of variation found in the blacks spots on the hindwings.

=== Technical description ===
Males and females. Upperside: black or brownish black, in fresh specimens in certain lights with a dull purplish flush. Fore wing: uniform, with a very slender thread-like edging of white to the costa. Hindwing: a large conspicuous orange-red patch on the posterior terminal half of the wing between the dorsum and vein 7; this patch does not extend quite to the termen but leaves a narrow edging of the black ground-colour which is produced inwards in short conical projections in interspaces 2 to 5. Cilia of both fore and hind wings chequered with black and white alternately. Underside: silvery white. Forewing: a quadrate spot on the discocellulars, a broad transverse discal band and the terminal third of the wing jet-black; the discal band is irregular, dislocated on vein 3, the posterior portion shifted inwards and joined onto the black area on the posterior terminal third of the wing by projections of black on the dorsum, along veins 3 and between veins 4 and 5; the black area on terminal third of the wing encloses a transverse postdiscal series of small round and a subterminal transversely near series of spots of the white ground-colour. Hind wing: two spots near base, a subbasal transverse series of three spots, a medial similar series of four somewhat elongate spots and a transverse short postdiscal bar between veins 4 and 6, jet-black; terminal third of the wing above vein 7 jet-black, below that vein deep orange-red, the whole area (both the black and the red) medially traversed by a transverse curved series of round spots of the white ground-colour and margined outwardly by a series of transverse, very short and very slender lines of the same in the interspaces; anteciliary line black. Cilia of both fore and hind wings chequered as on the upperside; a short filamentous tail at apex of vein 2 black, tipped white. Antennae, head, thorax and abdomen black, shafts of the antennae ringed with white; beneath: palpi, thorax and abdomen while.

— Bingham, C.T., 1907

== Range ==
Himalayan foothills, North India, South India, Meghalaya, Assam, Sri Lanka and North Myanmar.

== Status ==
They are widely distributed in peninsular India, and have been recorded from many localities in Maharashtra, Karnataka, Punjab, and Odisha. They are also found in the hilly regions of northeastern India and northern Myanmar. Studies suggest that they may be on the way to colonizing the foothills of the Himalayas due to changes in the habitat.

== Habitat ==
They are found in semi-arid plains, degraded patches of evergreen patches, and semi-evergreen forest, gardens, hill stations and forests—in fact, wherever its food plant, Kalanchoe, is abundant. It is found from the plains up to 8,000 feet.

== Habits ==
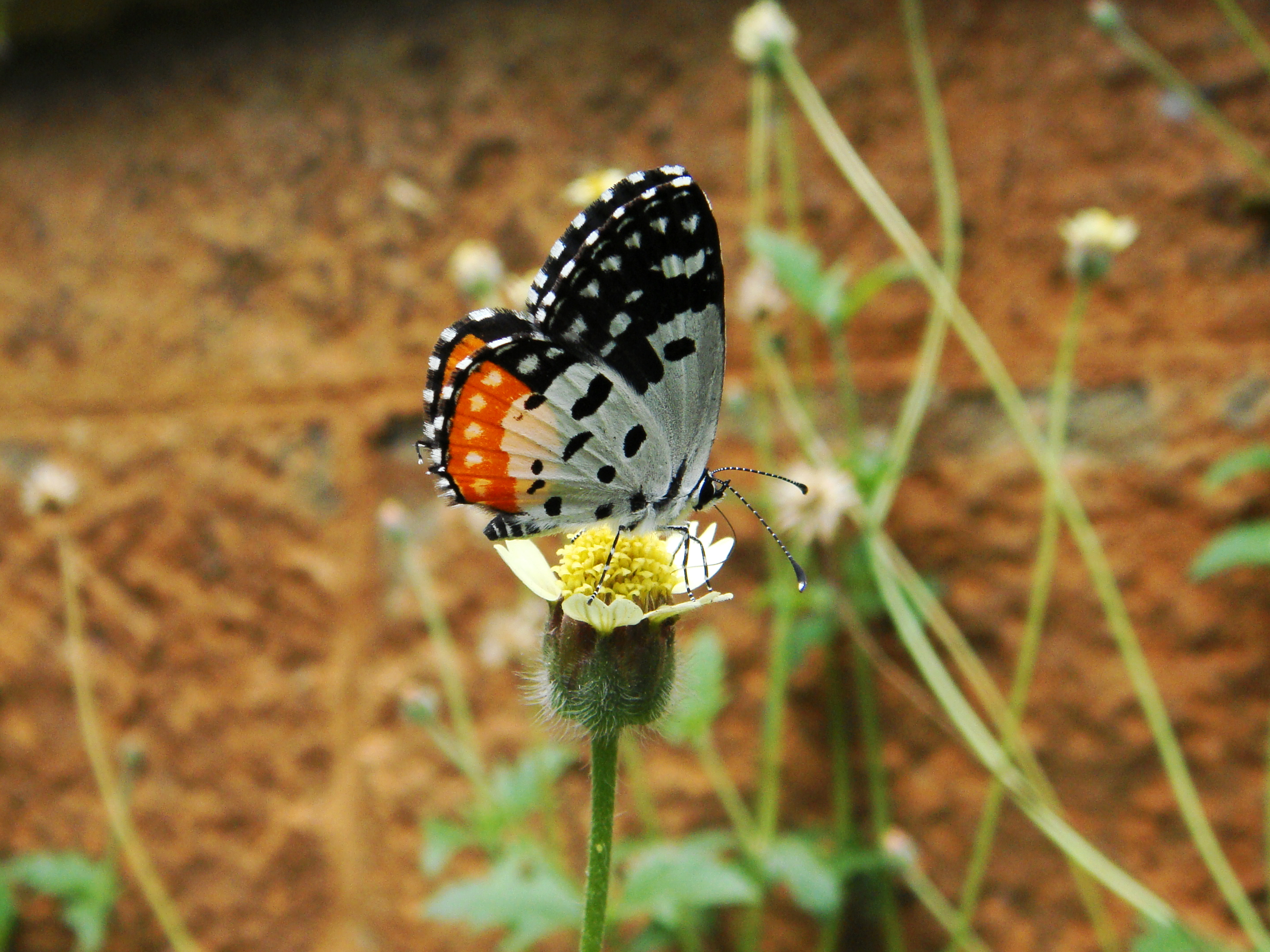
A red Pierrot Feeding at Garware College, Pune, India

The red Pierrot is a weak flier, and flutters about close to the ground. It flies in short bursts and settles often but not for very long. It basks with its wings half open, but prefers shade to sun, and jungle or undergrowth to open areas. It keeps on the wing almost till dark when it settles on the undersides of leaves and twigs often in company. It is sluggish early in the morning and late in the evening. It visits flowers of herbs, especially of the families Amaranthaceae and Acanthaceae, for nectar. It visits both ornamental and wild flowers and varieties of Alternanthera are among its favourites.

It always sits with its wings closed to display the bright markings of its undersides. It fearlessness, weak flight and distinctive markings all indicate that it is a protected butterfly, which is peculiar considering that its host plants are not known to contain any sequestrable toxins.

There is a mention in literature of the species being found at lights at night, however such phenomena are usually restricted to species that are crepuscular and this occurrence may be incidental.

== Life history ==
It is not a common butterfly, but near its food plant, Kalanchoe, it is found in abundance and is gregarious in all its stages.

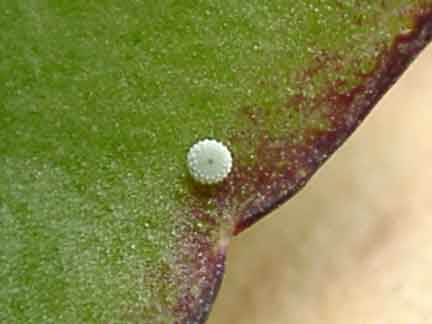
Single egg laid on Kalanchoe leaf.

=== Egg ===
The female lays eggs on the underside of a leaf. They are light green ellipsoid-shaped small egg. Young and old leaves are selected without discrimination as the leaves of Kalanchoe are thick and succulent during all stages.

=== Caterpillar ===
The caterpillar is pale yellow to a dirty white, and flattened with large, jet black spiracles. The entire body is covered with tiny white setae or bristle-like hair.

This caterpillar is a leaf miner by habit and this serves as its defense. As soon as it hatches it bores into the leaf and will spend the rest of its life between the epidermal layers of the leaf. Occasionally it will change leaves.

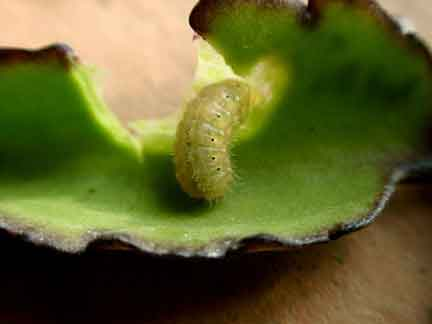
Caterpillar of red Pierrot seen changing leaves.

The caterpillar tunnels through the entire leaf in a neat winding manner so as to make sure to consume the entire leaf. It leaves a black trail within that is filled with droppings. The caterpillar can only be seen when it is changing leaves or when it comes to the surface to pupate.

Onisciform, but much rounded, and with the segments at the divisions very clearly defined; head small, almost concealed; last segment flattened. It is in colour fleshy-white, with a row of nine small black dots along the back on each side and a ring of four similar dots on the segment nearest the head; it is profusely covered with small white hairs. It feeds in the interior of the fleshy leaves of Bryophyllum calycinum, only emerging in order to turn into a pupa.

— Davidson, Bell and Aitken quoted in Bingham

=== Pupa ===
At the time of pupation the caterpillar comes out of the leaf and weaves a silk pad and a tight body band and then moults to form the pupa. The pupa can be either on the under or upper surface of the leaf. It is yellow and covered with long light hairs. The pupa is also marked with numerous black spots all over the body.

... much resembles the larva, being short and stout and blunt and covered with short-white hair. It is of the same fleshy colour as the larva and has two lines of small black dots along the surface of the abdomen continued along the thorax. It also has a third row of four similar dots on the middle of the abdomen between them; the two dots on the thorax nearest the head are also connected by two other dots.

— Davidson, Bell and Aitken quoted in Bingham

=== Food plants ===
The larval host plants are Kalanchoe laciniata and K. pinnata of the family Crassulaceae (stonecrop family); the latter host being a common garden plant. Adult butterflies have sometimes been seen to visit lichens. Studies suggest that they collect phenolic substances by scraping lichens.

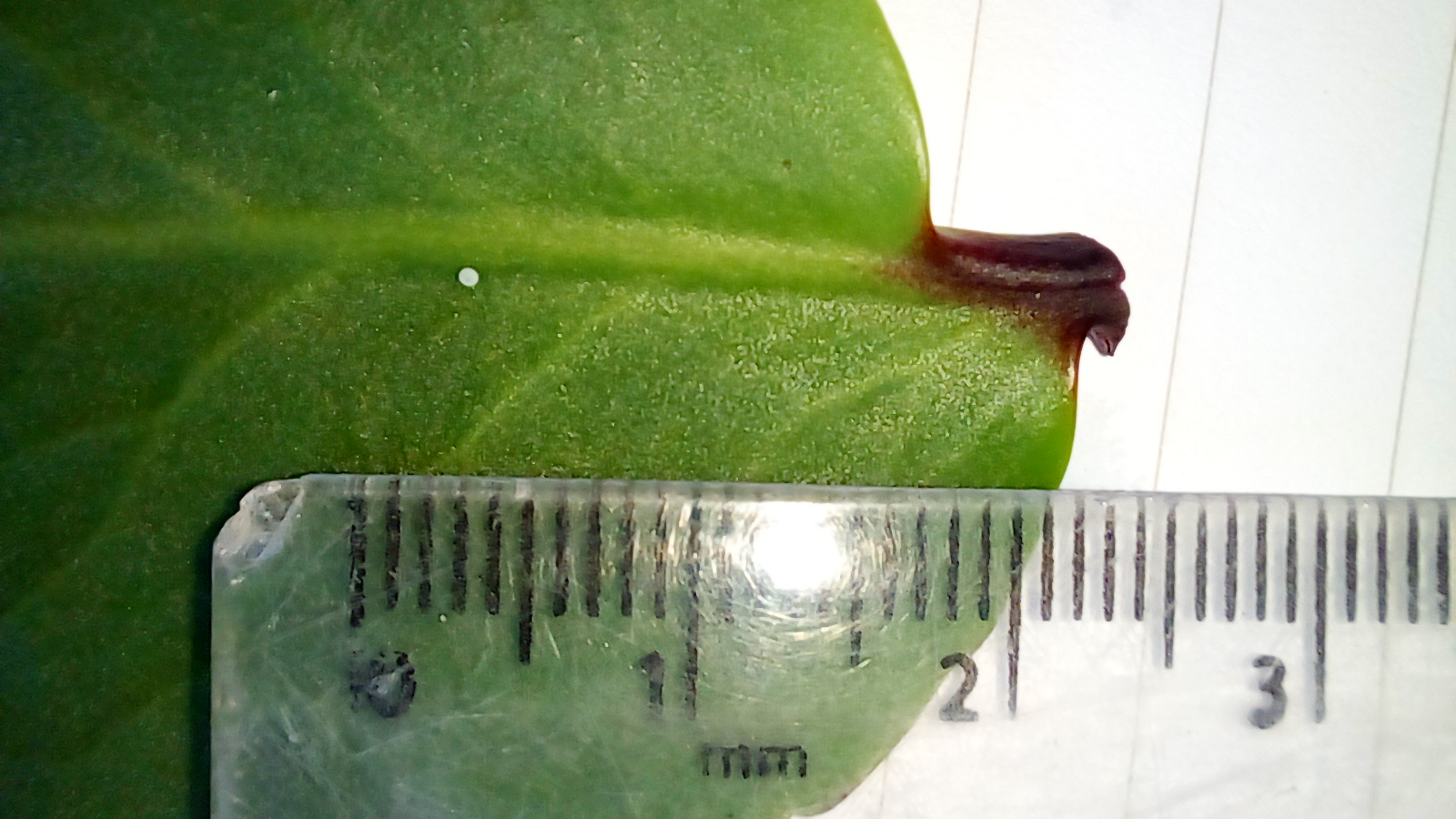
Egg

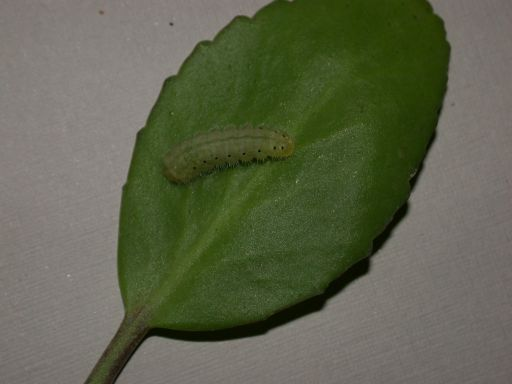
Caterpillar

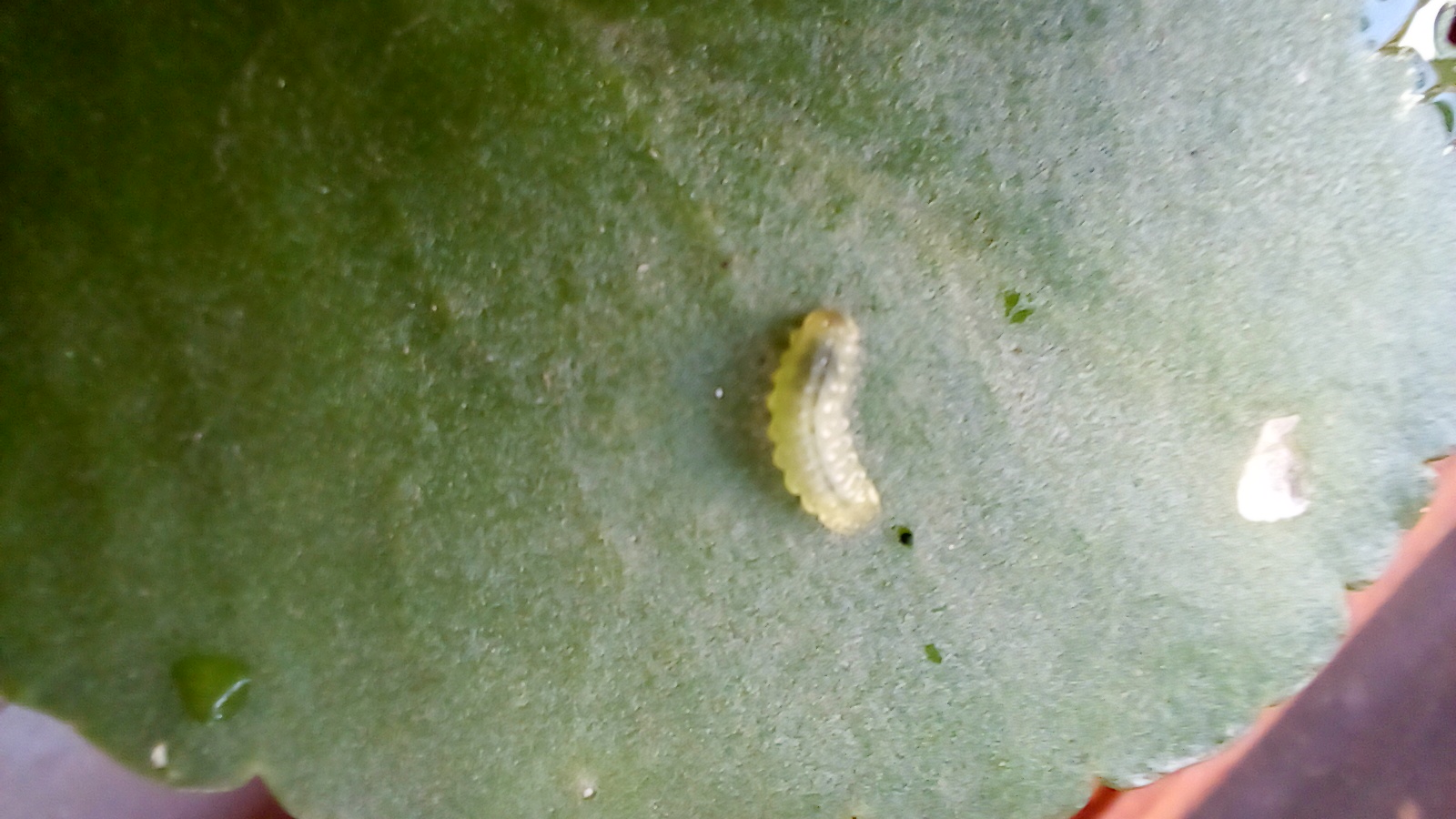
Larva

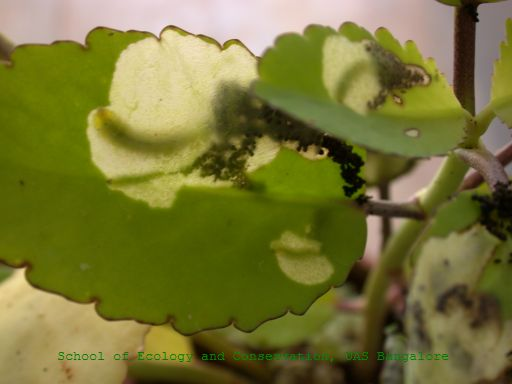
Caterpillar

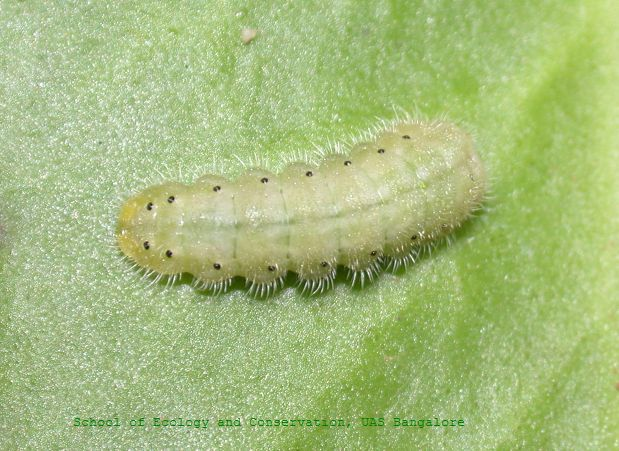
Caterpillar

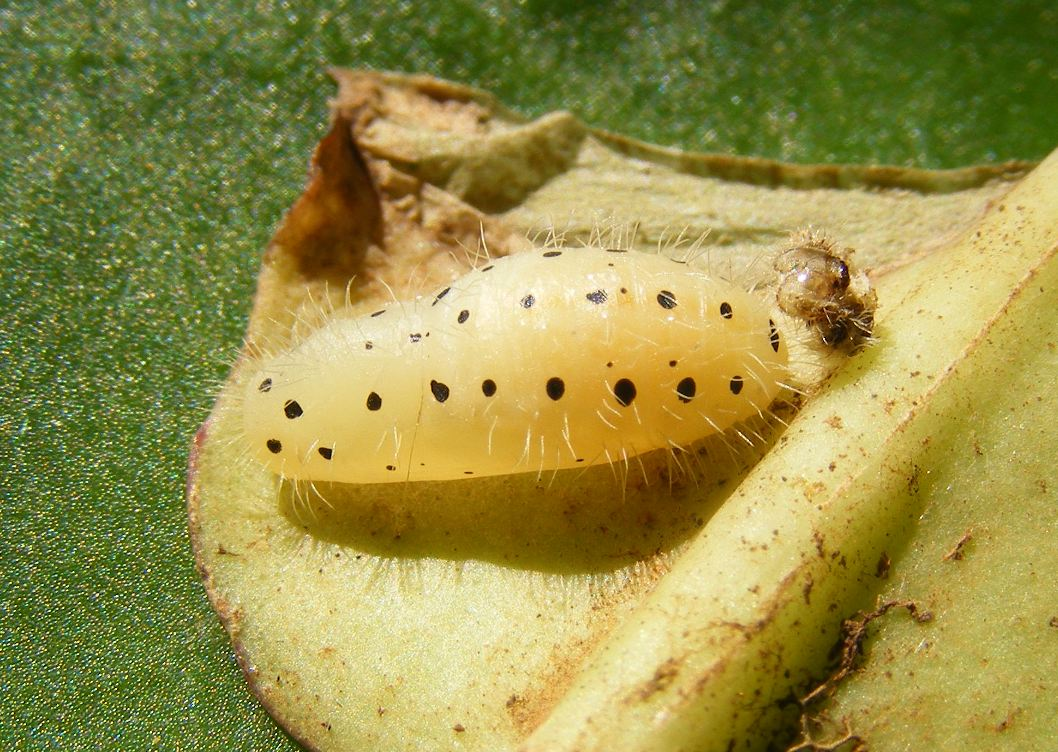
Pupa

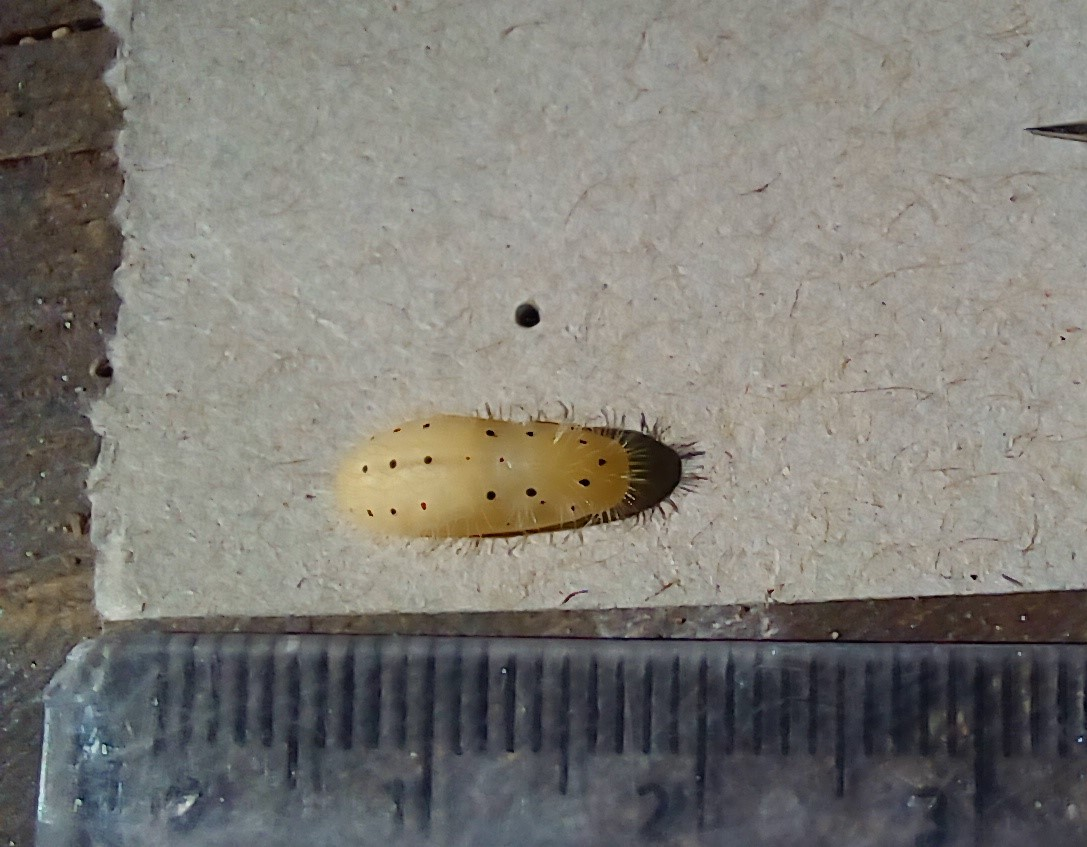
Pupa

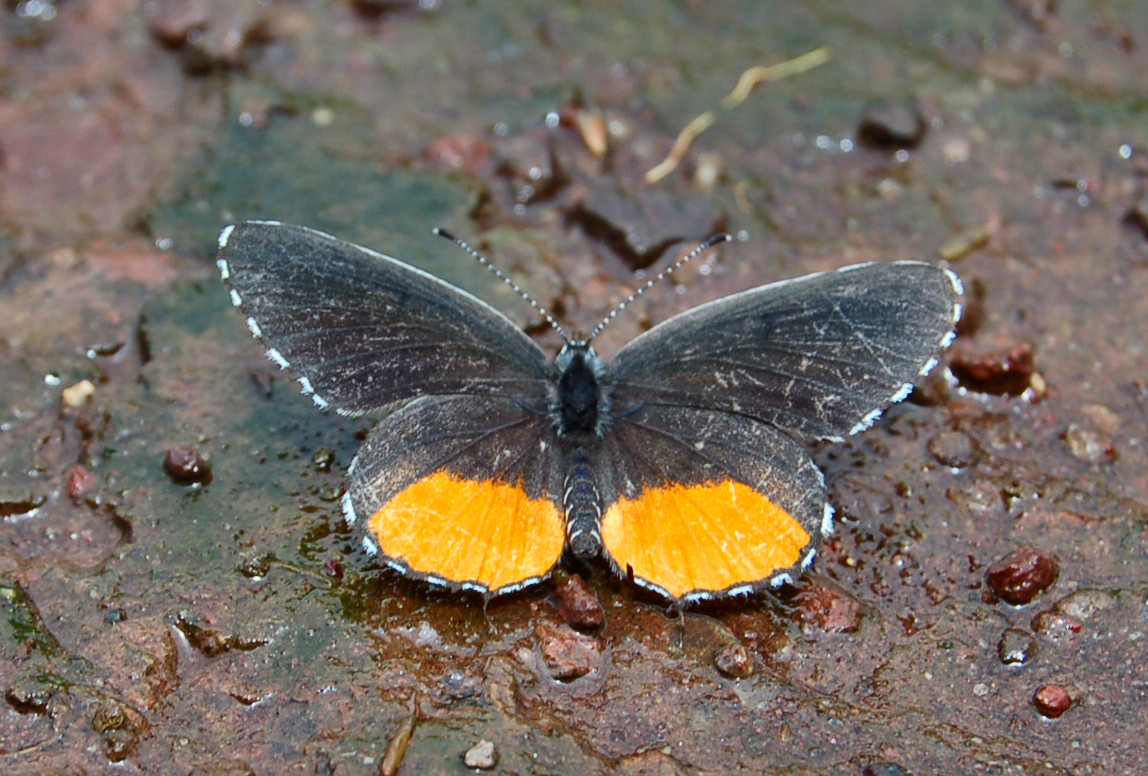
Soaking up the sun

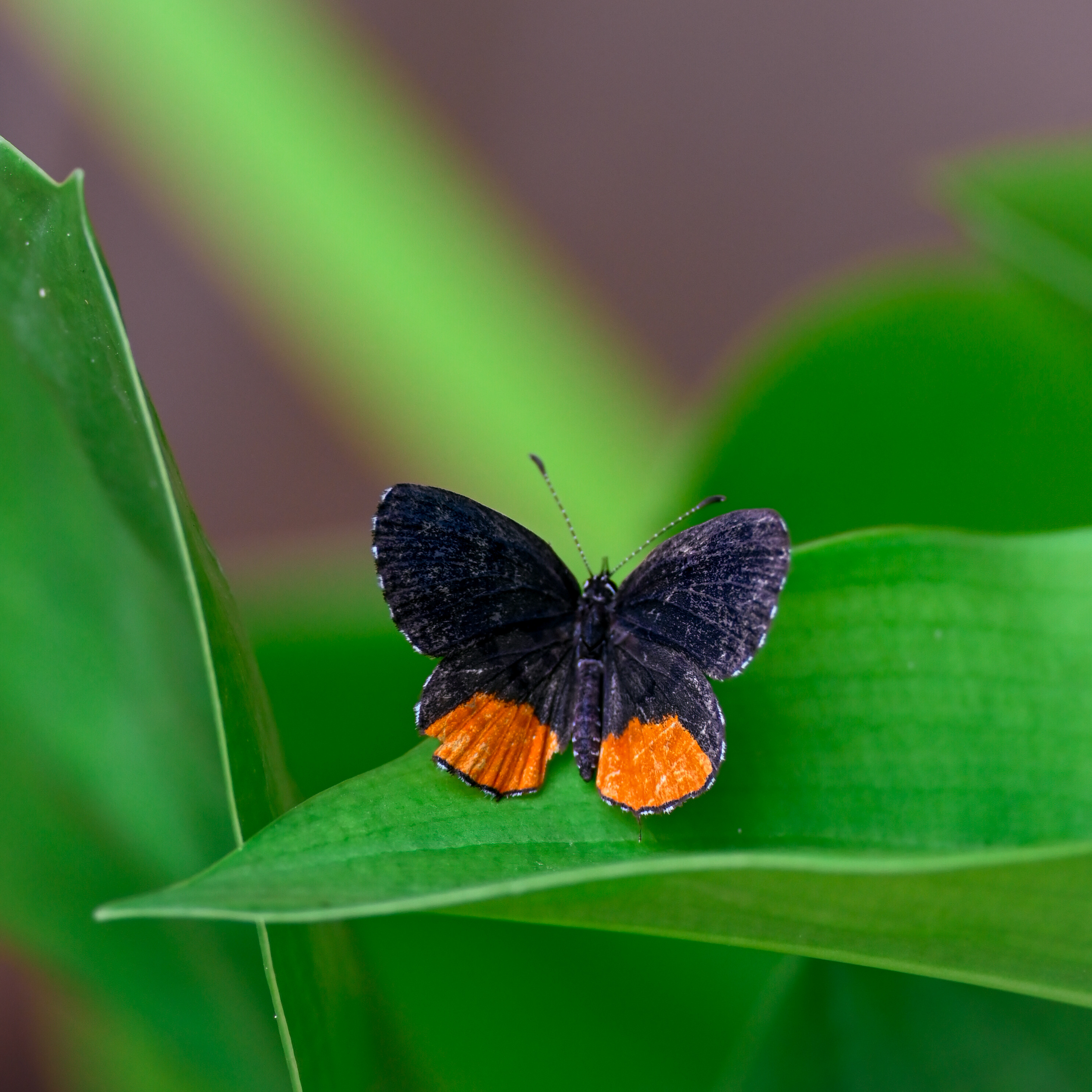
spotted in Jorhat, Assam

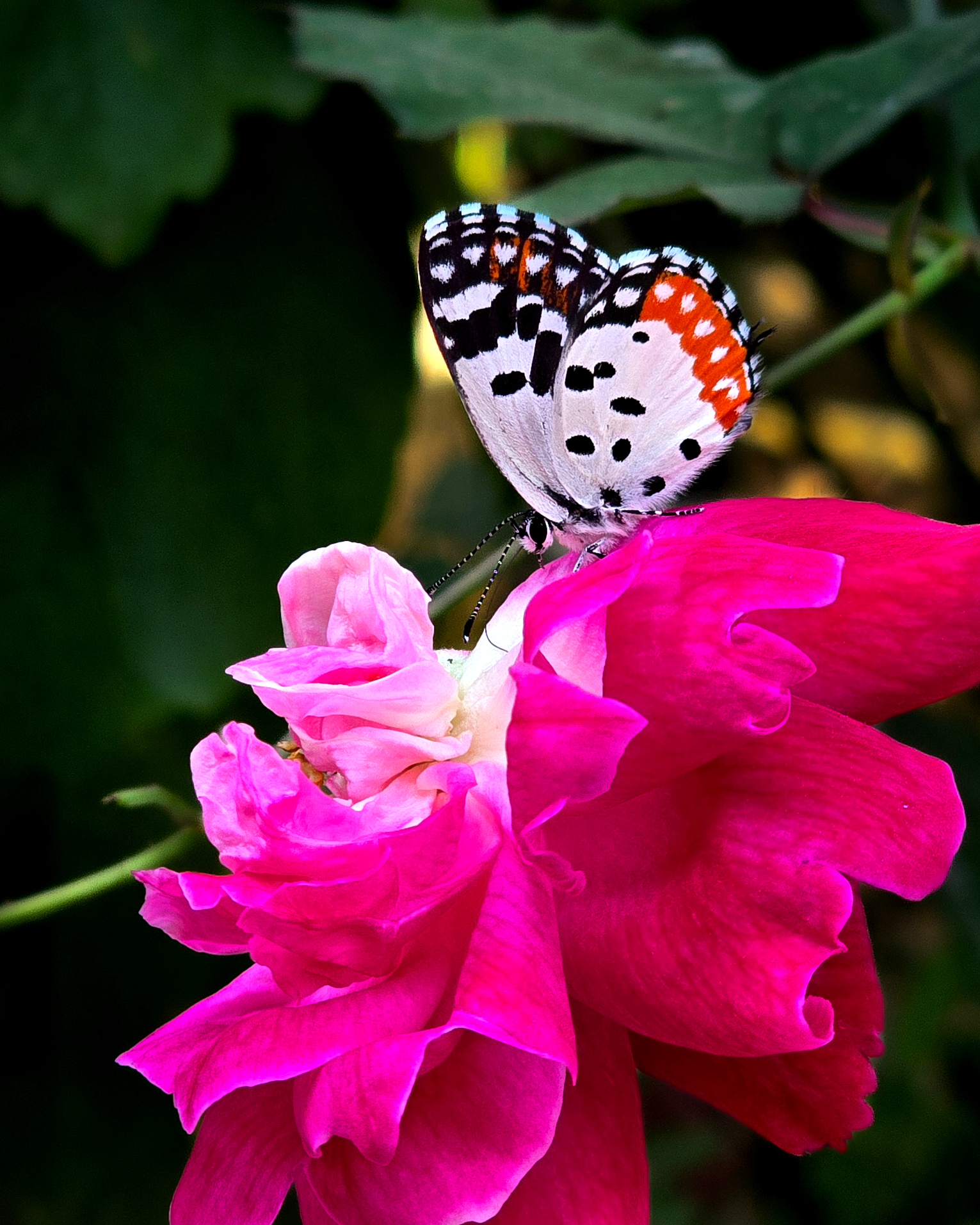
spotted in Jorhat, Assam

== See also ==
- List of butterflies of India (Lycaenidae)
- List of butterflies of the Western Ghats
