= Bhave =

Bhave is an Indian family name. It is a surname that is found in the Chitpawan Brahmin community of Maharashtra.

== Notable ==
- Bhave of Ramdurg State - Rulers of the Princely state during British era
- Vaman Prabhakar Bhave - One of the founders of Bhave High School in Pune
- Vishnudas Bhave (-1901)- Regarded as the founder of the modern Marathi Musical theatre
- Vinoba Bhave (1895–1982)- Indian Freedom fighter and Social reformer
- Purushottam Bhaskar Bhave - Marathi writer
- Surendra Bhave - Indian cricketer
- Kedar Bhave - Indian cricketer
- C. B. Bhave - Indian financial regulator
- Ashwini Bhave - Marathi and Hindi film actress
- Subodh Bhave - Marathi film actor and director
- Sunil Bhave - current judge in Cook County and former elected member of the Community Consolidated School District 59 Board of Education (2015–2019)

== See also ==
- Vinoba Bhave University
