= Sujata Manohar =

Indian judge (born 1934)

Sujata V. Manohar
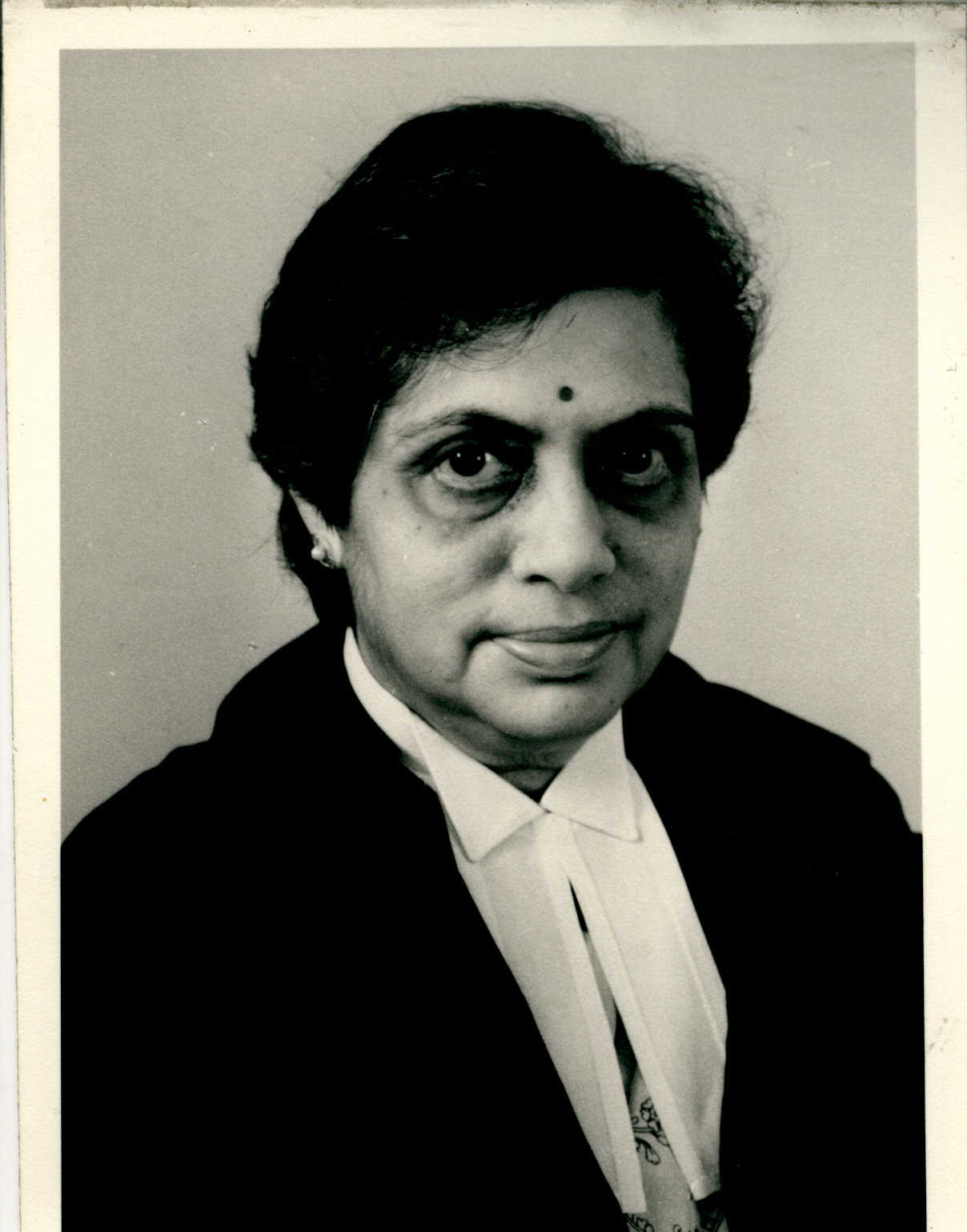

Judge of the Supreme Court of India
- In office 8 November 1994 – 27 August 1999

Chief Justice of the Kerala High Court
- In office 21 April 1994 – 7 November 1994

Chief Justice of the Bombay High Court
- In office 15 January 1994 – 20 April 1994

Judge of the Bombay High Court
- In office 23 January 1978 – 14 April 1994

Personal details
- Born: 28 August 1934 (age 91) Bombay, India
- Parent: K. T. Desai (father)
- Education: B.A. (Oxon.), Barrister-at-Law
- Alma mater: Lady Margaret Hall, Oxford
- Website: Supreme Court of India

Sujata Vasant Manohar (born 28 August 1934) is a former judge of the Supreme Court of India and a former member of the National Human Rights Commission of India.

== Early life and education ==
Manohar was born into a family with a strong legal background - her father Kantilal Thakoredas Desai would later become the second chief justice of the Gujarat High Court. She graduated from Elphinstone College, Bombay, and then went to Lady Margaret Hall, Oxford where she read Philosophy, Politics and Economics.

== Career ==
After Oxford, she was called to the Bar at Lincoln's Inn, having simultaneously passed all papers in Parts 1 & 2 of the Bar Exam. She returned to India where she began practice in 1958 on the original side of the Bombay High Court. She dealt primarily with commercial matters, but also took many family law cases under legal aid schemes. This was before India had a formal state legal aid programme, so she voluntarily associated herself with over 30 non-governmental organisations.

After around 20 years of practice, which included a substantial amount of public interest and pro-bono work, she was appointed a judge of the High Court of Bombay in 1978, the first woman judge of that court. Among the cases she decided was Garware Plastics and Polyester v. Telelink. In January, 1994, she was appointed chief justice of the High Court of Bombay, the first woman to hold that post. In April, 1994, she was transferred as the chief justice of the Kerala High Court, again the first woman to hold that post. At the end of 1994 (November), after 16 years as a High Court judge, she was appointed a judge of the Supreme Court of India and later retired in 1999.

As a judge, she took a strongly independent stance, defending the rule of law against political and public pressures. In one case, she was called upon to decide on the constitutionality of one aspect of India's affirmative action programme. The government of the day proposed to require Universities to implement a system of quotas for admission to research degrees. This meant that available places would be parcelled out to students based on their caste and religion, not just on their merit. Justice Manohar ruled this unconstitutional, despite a strong backlash from certain interest groups, who, in a show of public umbrage, burnt her effigy.

After her retirement, she was appointed to the National Human Rights Commission. She is an honorary fellow of Lady Margaret Hall, Oxford, and an honorary bencher of Lincoln's Inn, London. She is also a patron of the Oxford University Commonwealth Law Journal.
