= Shashikant Garware =

Indian Industrialist (born 1934)

- Born: Shashikant Bhalchandra Garware; 5 November 1934 (age 91); Mumbai India
- Education: Dulwich College, London
- Occupation: Industrialist
- Spouses: Sheila Shashikant Garware

Shashikant Bhalchandra Garware (born 5 November 1934) is an Indian industrialist and the founder, chairman, and managing director of Garware Hi-Tech Films Limited (formerly Garware Polyester Limited). He is credited with starting the polyester industry in India in June 1957.

== Early life and education ==
Garware was born on 5 November 1934 in Bombay, India. He is the son of Abasaheb Garware.He completed his early education in India before attending Dulwich College in London. He later studied senior business management at the University of Edinburgh. In 2022, he was awarded a D.Litt. by Mumbai University for his contributions to the polyester industry and philanthropic services.

== Career ==
Garware returned to India in 1951 and joined his father at Garware Motors Ltd. In 1957, he became involved in the polyester film industry with the establishment of Garware Polyester Ltd, now known as Garware Hi-Tech Films Ltd (GHFL). In 1982, GHFL introduced UV-stabilized polyester film in India. The U.S. Patent Authority issued a patent for this product.

== Philanthropy ==
The Garware Charitable Trust was established in 1962. The Trust provides financial support to educational institutions, hospitals, and healthcare centers.

The trust provided financial aid to the Bombay Cricket Association (BCA), which named the clubhouse and members' pavilion at Wankhede Stadium as the Garware Club House. In 1993, the Garware Community Centre was established in Aurangabad to support sports and cultural activities. Financial assistance was also provided to the Aurangabad Municipal Corporation for the development of a stadium in MIDC Chikalthana, now known as Garware Stadium.

Garware has served as a Director on the Central Board of the State Bank of India and the Life Insurance Corporation of India. He was also an Honorary Consul General of Turkey for their Western India Office and served as President of the Maharashtra Chamber of Commerce and Industry. During this period, he faced allegations of corporate misgovernance.

== Honours and awards ==
In 1981, Garware was awarded the Gold Shield for Import Substitution by the Government of India. GHFL received the Plexconcil Top Exporter's Award for exporting high-tech polyester films for over three consecutive decades. In 2022, he was conferred an honorary Doctor of Literature (D.Litt.) degree by Shri Bhagat Singh Koshyari, then Governor of Maharashtra and Chancellor of Mumbai University.
