= Oxford University Commonwealth Law Journal =

- Discipline: International law
- Language: English
- Edited by: Tobias Lutzi

Publication details
- History: 2001-present
- Publisher: Taylor and Francis (United Kingdom)
- Frequency: Biannually

Standard abbreviations
- ISO 4: Oxf. Univ. Commonw. Law J.

Indexing
- ISSN: 1472-9342

Links
- Journal homepage; Online access

The Oxford University Commonwealth Law Journal (OUCLJ) is a postgraduate-edited international and comparative law journal from the University of Oxford's Faculty of Law, covering the study of legal trends and developments within and between Commonwealth jurisdictions.

== Content ==
The journal includes articles, case notes and book reviews. Case notes critically analyse and evaluate rulings from the House of Lords, the Privy Council, and the national courts of the Commonwealth States.

=== Topics of recent articles ===
- Comparative: good faith; agency; consideration; legitimate expectation; equity and unregistered land rights; recovery of economy loss in negligence; the Westminster system; breach of trust; comparative models of constitutionalism; unjust enrichment; rights of survivorship; violence in professional sport; entrapment; Internet libel.
- Africa: state liability in Botswana; economic development in Ghana; policing in Kenya; management of land in Nigeria; extrajudicial services of judges in South Africa; corporate insolvency in Zambia.
- Asia: human rights litigation in Hong Kong; confidentiality regarding HIV/AIDS in India; case-management in Singapore.
- The Americas: capital punishment in the Caribbean; freedom of religious expression in Canada.
- Oceania: native title in Australia; the rule of law in Fiji; jurisprudential theory in New Zealand; divorce in the Solomon Islands.
- Compulsory voting
- Statutory interpretation

== Organisation ==
The OUCLJ was for its first decade published by Hart Publishing but moved to Taylor & Francis in 2015. It is the flagship journal of the University of Oxford's postgraduate law community, designed for contributions from academics, professionals and policy-makers, wherever situated, on matters of current interest to Commonwealth legal systems. Created in 2001, the journal provides a forum for international debate on both private and public law topics. Some pieces are explicitly comparative in orientation, while others concern a single jurisdiction only. All pieces published in the OUCLJ are selected on the basis that they are likely to be of interest to a larger Commonwealth audience. Submissions for publication are double-blind peer reviewed. The journal is financially assisted by the Rhodes Trust.

== Patrons ==
The journal is supported by a board of patrons consisting of current or former judges from Commonwealth jurisdictions, namely:

- Sophia Akuffo (Ghana)
- Edwin Cameron (South Africa)
- James Edelman (Australia)
- Brenda Hale (England & Wales)
- Kenneth Hayne (Australia)
- Sir Kenneth Keith (New Zealand)
- Sujata Manohar (India)
- Mumbi Ngugi (Kenya)
- Robert Ribeiro (Hong Kong)
- Robert Sharpe (Canada)
- Anthony Smellie (Cayman Islands)

Sophia Akuffo, Lady Hale, and Mumbi Ngugi were appointed in 2017, following the passing of Lord Goff.
