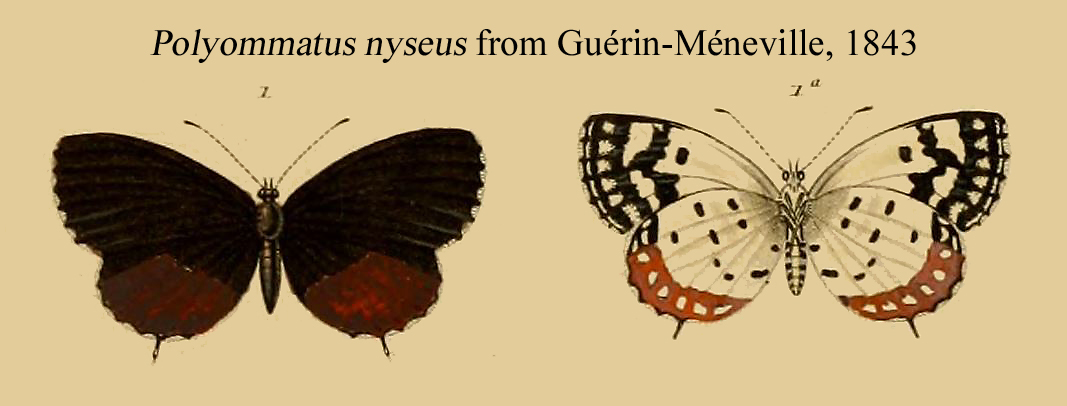
- Talicada nyseus as Polyommatus nyseus, India, from original description.

Scientific classification
- Kingdom: Animalia
- Phylum: Arthropoda
- Class: Insecta
- Order: Lepidoptera
- Family: Lycaenidae
- Subfamily: Polyommatinae
- Tribe: Polyommatini
- Genus: Talicada; Moore, 1881

= Talicada =

Butterfly genus in family Lycaenidae

Talicada is an Indomalayan genus of butterflies in the family Lycaenidae.

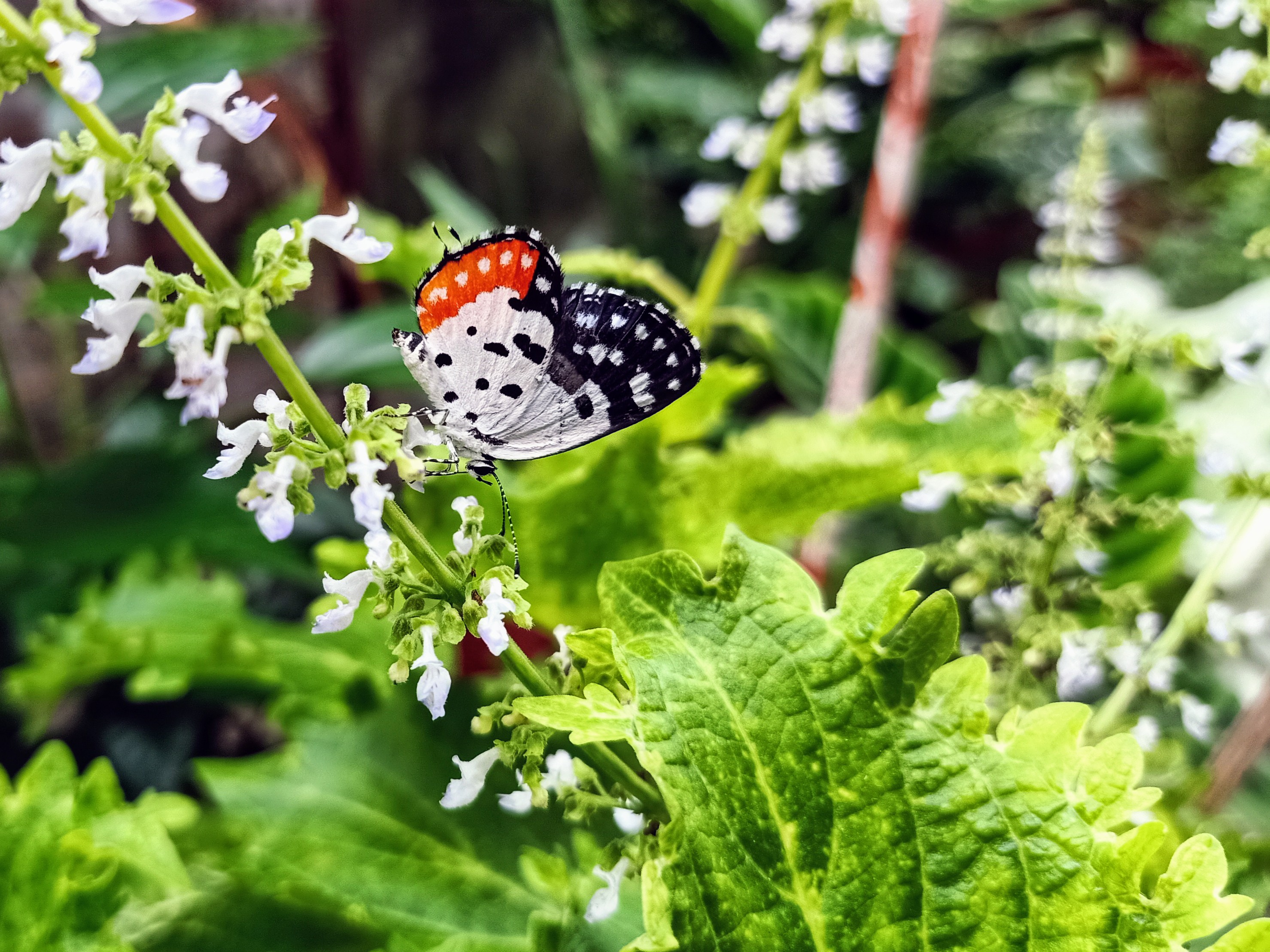

== Species ==
- Talicada nyseus (Guérin-Méneville, 1843) – Red Pierrot
- Talicada metana Riley & Godfrey, 1921 Thailand
- Talicada buruana Holland, 1900 Buru
