= Garware Plastics and Polyester v. Telelink =

1989 Indian court case

- Court: Bombay High Court
- Decided: 1989

Garware Plastics and Polyester v. Telelink was a court case in India, handled by the Bombay High Court and decided on 31 January 1989.

== Facts ==
The case was handled by the Bombay High Court, citation AIR 1989 Bom 331, and was decided by Justice S. Manohar. In this case, the plaintiffs (Garware Plastics and Polyester) held the right, through assignment, to telecast a cinematograph film by means of video cassettes. One of the plaintiffs had granted the right to telecast their films to the Government of India on its channel, Doordarshan, but retained the right to telecast the films via cable TV.

The defendant (Telelinks) bought the copyrighted videocassettes of the plaintiff and showed the film on their cable TV, thereby infringing the copyright of the plaintiff in respect to public performance, which is an exclusive right under the Indian Copyright Act, 1957.

== Question of law ==
Whether the defendants, by showing video films over Cable TV to various subscribers, are broadcasting these films to the public and thereby infringing the plaintiffs’ copyright.

== Statutory provisions ==
Under Section 13(1), "A copyright is recognized in respect to cinematography films".[1] Under S. 2(f), "Cinematography film", is defined to "include the sound track, if any, and cinematography shall be constructed as including any work produced by any process analogous to cinematography".

S. 14(1)(c), ""copyright in a cinematography film", means the exclusive right to do or authorize the doing of any of the following acts, namely: (I) to make a copy of the film: (ii) to cause the film, in so far as it consists if visual images, to be seen in public and, in so far as it consists of sounds, to be heard in public : (iii) to make any record embodying the recording in any part of the sound track associated with the film by utilizing such sound track: (iv) to communicate the film by broadcast."

S. 51. "Copyright in a work shall be deemed to be infringed, inter alia, when any person, without a license granted by the Copyright under the Act, does anything the exclusive right to do which is by this Act conferred upon the owner of the copyright.

== Defendant's plea ==
The defendant argued that showing the film via cable TV, which is limited to the private space of the subscribers, does not constitute a broadcast to the public.

== Precedents ==
To understand the difference between public and private broadcasting, the following cases were referred to:

1. Harms (Incorporated), Ltd and Chappell and Company Ltd vs Martans Club Limited

The plaintiffs were the owners of a play, "Tip Toes". The defendant, a club, showed the play within the club. The main question before the court was whether such an act was in public.

The court held that the purpose of the Act was to protect the author from any injury or loss of profit by reason of any representation of their composition in public, which would have ordinarily fetched financial gain. The court distinguished "such an audience from a private or domestic audience which would consist of members of the family and household." The court also considered the place where the performance occurred and held that the club, which accepted members from the public and guests, could not be considered a place equivalent to an enlarged family.

2. Messager vs British Broadcasting Company, Ltd

The plaintiff was the composer of a comic opera, "The Little Michus". He gave the right to perform the opera to the producer, who in turn licensed the BBC to broadcast it. The plaintiff filed a suit against the BBC as he did not have a contract with them. The BBC argued that the performance of the opera would take place in the privacy of its studio, thus not being a broadcast to the public under the English Copyright Act. However, the court rejected this claim and held that since the opera was to be broadcast via wireless technology, it was a broadcast to the public.

The decision was overturned by the Court of Appeals, which considered the agreement between the plaintiff, the producer, and the BBC.

3. Jennings vs Stephens

The Duston Women's Institute, without the plaintiff's consent, performed a copyrighted play. The court concluded that "mere numbers cannot be the test." The court held that the true test is the "character of the audience." The second test given by the court was that "in public" must be understood in relation to the owner of the copyright, meaning performing in front of his or her public. The court held that the performance was private.

4. Performance Right Society Ltd vs Hawthorns Hotel Ltd

The court applied the above test in this case and held that the performance in the lounge of the hotel was a public performance.

5. Ernest Turner Electrical Instruments Ltd vs Performance Right Society Ltd

The court applied the Jennings vs Stephens test to examine the nature of music being played in the workplace.

6. Performing Right Society Ltd vs Hammons Brandford Brewery Co. Ltd

In this case, the court emphasised the nature of the place where the performance took place. The plaintiff had given the defendant a license to play music in the hotel, but the defendant used loudspeakers that could be heard by bystanders. The court held that this was a public performance.

7. Performing Rights Society Ltd vs Camelo

In a similar case to the Brandford Brewery case, the defendant used loudspeakers that could be heard in adjacent buildings. The court held that there was an infringement because it was performed in public.

8. Mellor vs Australian Broadcasting Commission

The plaintiff, through pamphlets, stated that their music was free for public performance. The plaintiff filed an infringement suit against the defendant. The Privy Council stated, "The original performance in the studio may be, and generally will be, a performance in private. In such a case the broadcast performance at the receiving end, if in public and unlicensed, will be an infringement of copyright at that place... If the broadcast is picked up only by listeners in private, it might be difficult to establish that there is a public performance: for each performance would be separate, and each would be private: but it is not necessary to express an opinion on this point."

The Privy Council did not express an opinion on whether the performance was public or private.

== Court observations ==
The Bombay High Court's observations were guided by various English cases. In most of these cases, the copyright owner was granted protection. To answer the question of law before the court, three main conditions were outlined for determining whether a work is performed in public or private:

- Nature of the audience,
- Whether the audience can be considered in relation to the owner of the copyright,
- Whether such a performance affects the protection of the copyright holder.

For the first condition, the Court held that while the movie is viewed in the privacy of homes, this does not negate the fact that it can also be seen in a public setting. Referring to Justice McCardie's opinion in *Messager v. British Broadcasting Company Ltd*, the Court noted: "Instead of gathering the audience in a theater, the defendants, by modern technology, are showing the film to that audience in their homes. To hold that this is not communication to the public would be to ignore the substance of the matter and the object and intent of the Copyright Act." Thus, the viewers are members of the public.

For the second condition, related to the relationship between the copyright owner and the viewers, the Court held that these viewers are not the plaintiff's domestic viewers but rather members of the public.

For the third condition, which helps determine the character of the audience with respect to the Indian Copyright Act, 1957, the Court opined that the primary aim of the Act is to ensure monetary gains for the owner of the intellectual property. Since the defendant charged a fee for cable services, he deprived the copyright owner of financial benefits.

The Court concluded: "In my view, a strong prima facie case has been made out by the plaintiffs for granting them interim relief. Undoubtedly, the business of the defendants will be affected as a result. But the plaintiffs will be severely affected if their copyright in the films is not protected, while the defendants can show the films after obtaining a licence under the Copyright Act."

== Judgment ==
The court issued an interim order restraining the defendants from broadcasting the film via cable TV.

== Similar case ==
In this case, the defendant provided an online facility for viewers to watch TV programmes while they were being aired. The programme producers, who were the copyright owners, contended that the defendant’s actions amounted to infringement. The Court observed that the defendant was not offering the programmes for free, but rather to subscribers who had paid a fee. It held that the defendant was depriving the copyright owners of their rightful monetary gains from their intellectual property.

The U.S. Supreme Court ruled that the right to broadcast to the public was an exclusive right of the copyright owner, as per the U.S. Copyright Act, 1976, and decided in favour of the plaintiff.
