= Bhave High School =

School based in Pune, India

MES Boys High School
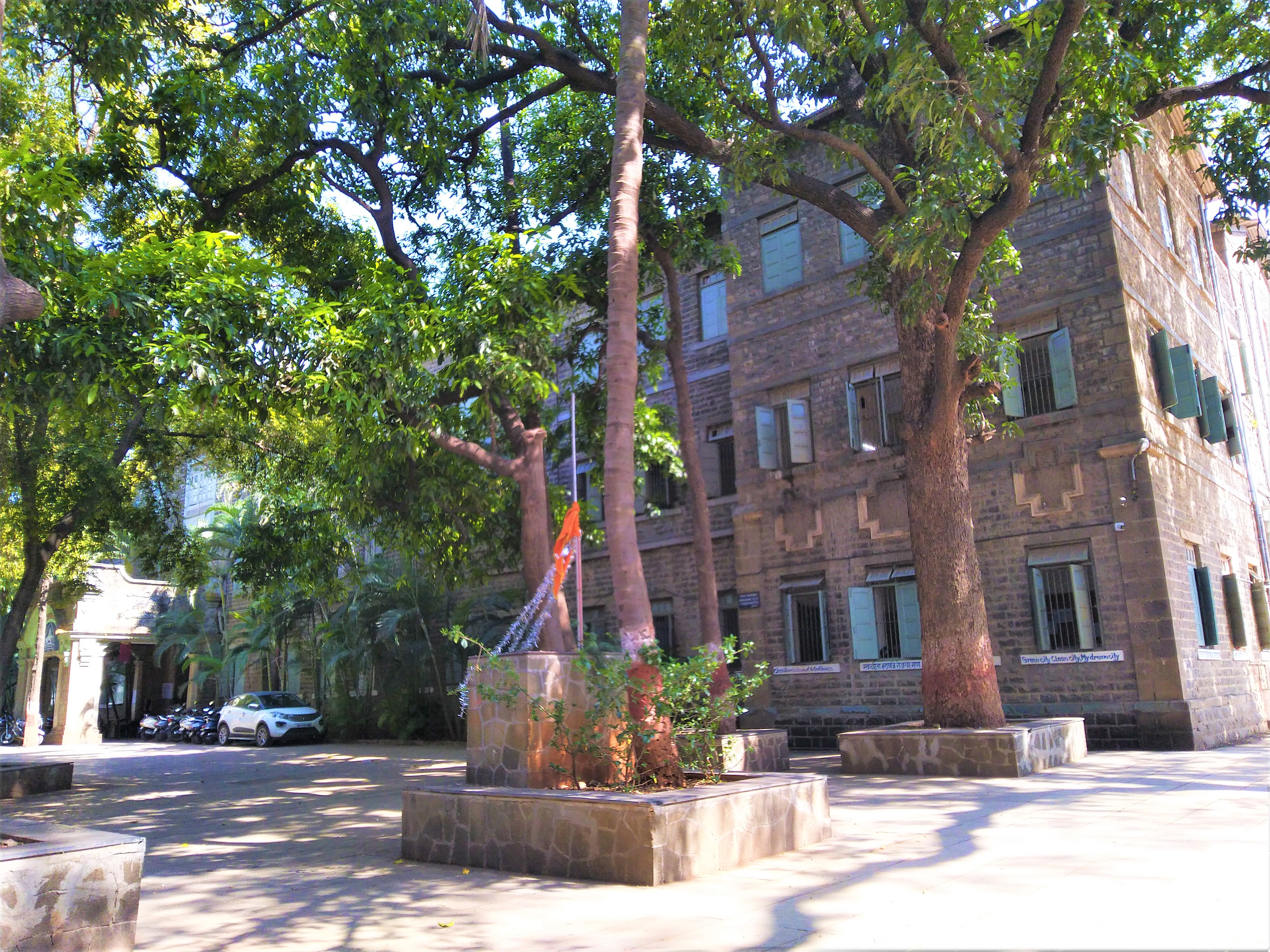
- Former names: Perugate Bhave School
- Type: Private
- Affiliations: Savitribai Phule Pune University; Maharashtra State Board of Secondary and Higher Secondary Education
- Location: Pune, Maharashtra, India; 18.5111366°N 73.8474051°E
- Campus: Urban
- Website: mespune.in/mes-boys-high-school-pune/

Bhave High School (also known as MES Boys High School) is a school and Junior college based in Pune, India. The institution is run by the Maharashtra Education Society, a private education institution founded by Vasudeo Balwant Phadke, Vaman Prabhakar Bhave and Laxman Narhar Indapurkar in 1860.

== Notable alumni ==
- Aditya Chaphalkar - space research scientist at the Vikram Sarabhai Space Centre in Thiruvananthapuram. He is also a Gold medallist at Indian Institute of Space Science and Technology (IISST), first recipient of the Indian Department of Space's Satish Dhawan Fellowship in 2013, fellowship and prize-winner for the master's degree in aerospace engineering at the California Institute of Technology.
- Pandurang Vasudeo Sukhatme (1911–1997) - Statistician, recipient of Padmabhushan award
- Prasad Oak - Marathi actor and national award winning director
- Mangesh Tendulkar - cartoonist
- Narendra Karmarkar - mathematician and creator of Karmarkar's algorithm
- Shriram Lagoo - stage and film actor

== See also ==
- Notable institutions run by Maharashtra Education Society (MES)
