= MES Garware College of Commerce =

College in Maharashtra, India

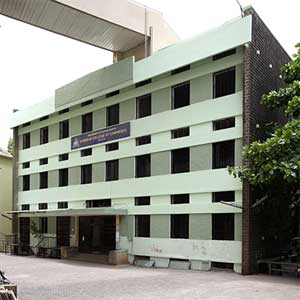
- Type: Private
- Established: 1967; 59 years ago
- Founders: Late Shri Vaman Prabhakar Bhave, Late Shri Vasudev Balavant Phadake and Late Shri Laxman Narhar Indapurkar
- Parent institution: Maharashtra Education Society, Pune
- Affiliations: Savitribai Phule Pune University
- Academic affiliations: Autonomous
- Principal: Dr.Kishor S. Desarda
- Students: 3000
- Location: MES Garware College of Commerce, Karve Road, Pune, Maharashtra, 411 004, India; 18.5110736°N 73.8393265°E
- Campus: Urban
- Language: English, Marathi
- Colors: Golden, dark blue
- Website: gcc.mespune.in
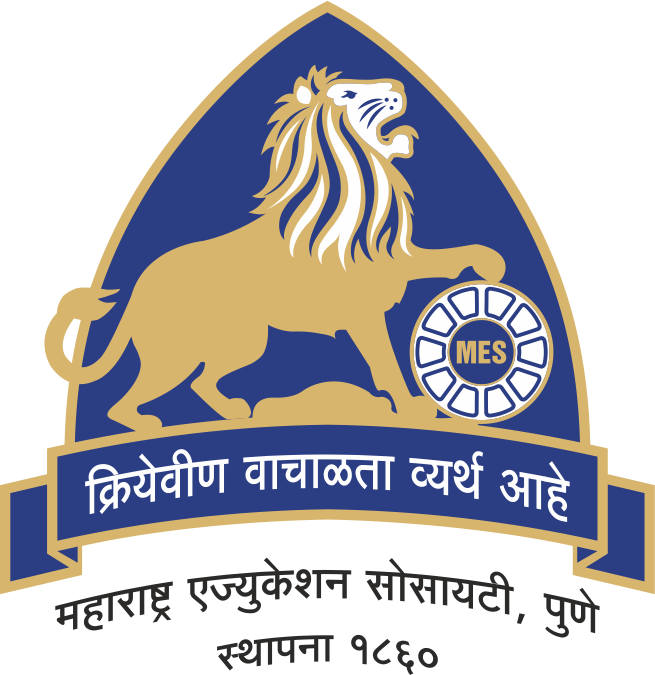

MES Garware College of Commerce was established in 1967 as an independent commerce college, Pune. The college was renamed as “M.E.S. Garware College of Commerce” in 1971. At present the college provides education up to Ph.D. level. The strength of students is about 3000. In 2021 the college has been conferred the Autonomous status from UGC and will be affiliated to the Savitribai Phule Pune University. College bagged ‘A’ grade from the National Assessment and Accreditation Council (NAAC), scoring grade points 3.45 out of 4 (in 3rd cycle). It is recognized by the University Grants Commission (UGC). The college infrastructure includes buildings and library, computer laboratories, reading halls, hostel, gymnasium.

== Autonomy ==
The college was awarded with autonomous status from University Grants Commission (UGC) in August 2021.

== College committees ==
- National Cadet Corps (NCC)
- National Service Scheme (NSS)
- Competitive Examinations Centre
- Dept. of Research, Innovations & Consultancy
- Business Lab
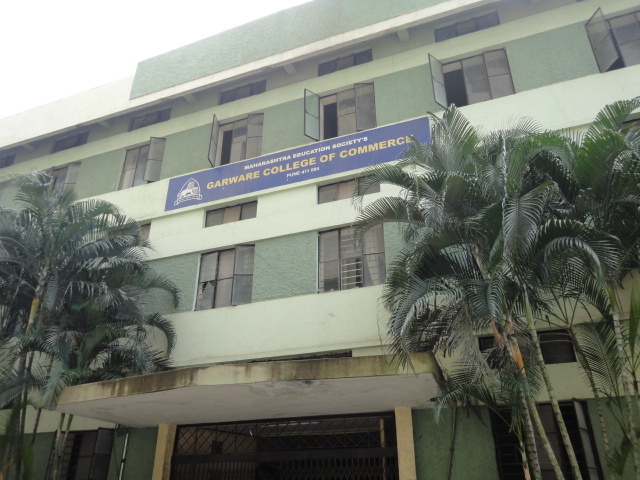
- Startup and Innovation Cell (E-Cell)
- Placement Cell
- International Relations Committee
- Soft Skills Development Centre
- Dramatics and Cultural Association
- Youth Red Cross
- Anti-ragging & Discipline Committee
- Alumni Association
- Vidyarthini Manch

== Recognition ==
The college is recognized by the University Grants Commission (UGC).

== Accreditation ==
- November 2016, received 'A' grade by the National Assessment and Accreditation Council (NAAC)

== Affliction ==
- Affiliated to Savitribai Phule Pune University

== Teaching-learning approach ==
- Assignments
- Case Studies
- Classroom Learning
- Excursion Tours
- Field Researches
- Guest Lectures
- Industry Visits
- Meditation & Yoga
- Panel Discussions
- Presentations
- Quizzes
- Research Projects
- Role Plays and Management Games
- Team Work

== Notable alumni and faculty ==
Notable alumni of MES Garware College of Commerce include

- Prakash Javdekar, Minister of Environment -Forest and Climate Change, Minister of Information and Broadcasting
- Sanjeev Abhyankar - Hindustani Classical Music Vocalist

Notable faculty members include

- D. M. Mirasdar - Marathi writer and narrator
