= Abasaheb Garware College =

College of Science and Arts in Pune, India

Abasaheb Garware College of Arts and Science
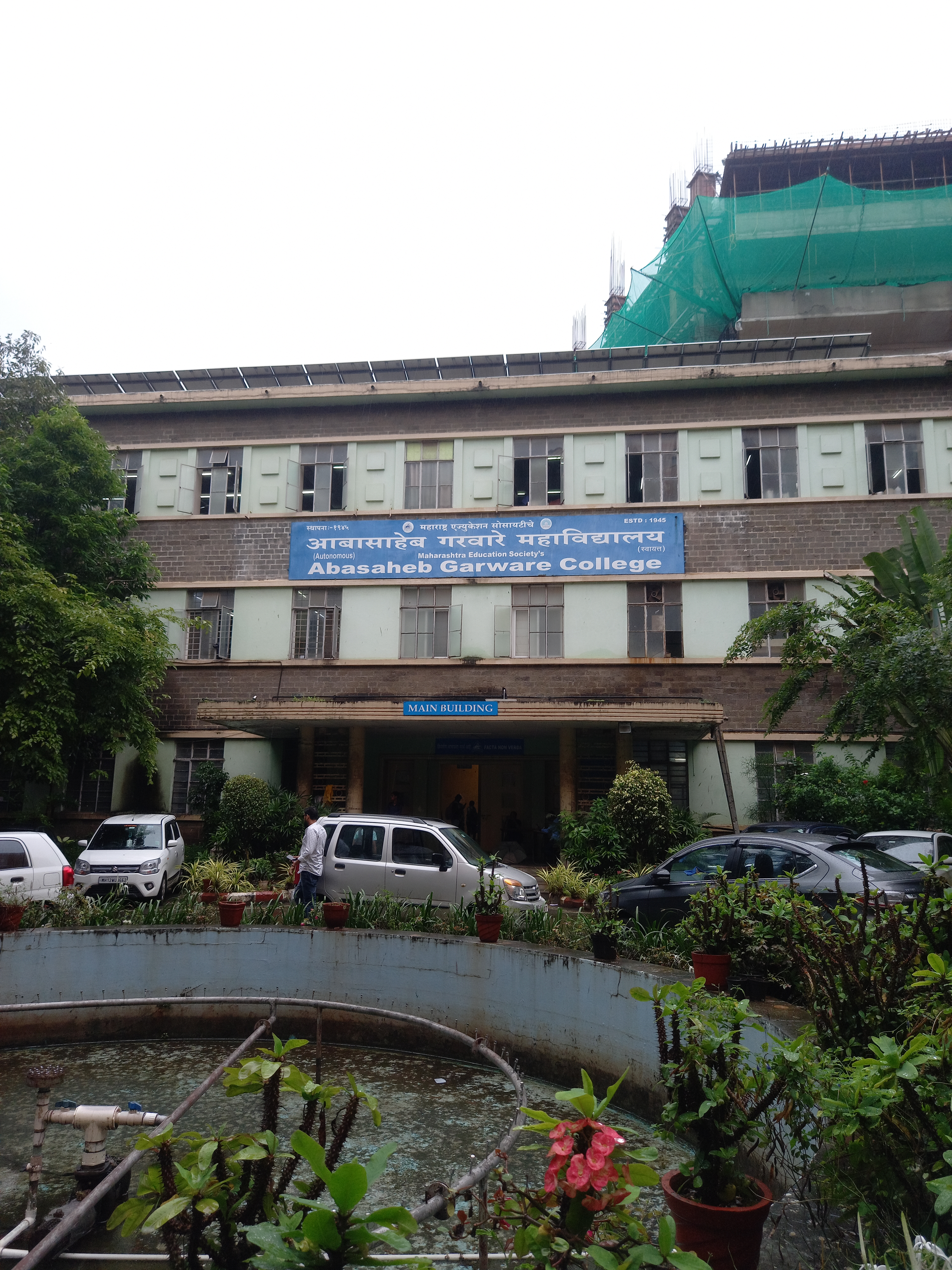
- Main Building of the AGC
- Former names: M.E.S College of Arts and Science
- Motto: Facta Non Verba
- Type: Private
- Established: 1945
- Affiliations: Savitribai Phule Pune University; Maharashtra State Board of Secondary and Higher Secondary Education
- Academic affiliations: Savitribai Phule Pune University
- President: Air Marshal Bhushan Gokhale (Retd.)
- Principal: Dr. Vilas R. Ugale
- Location: Karve Rd, opp. Sahyadri Hospital, Kripali Society, Bharati Niwas Colony, Erandwane, Pune, Maharashtra, 411004, India
- Campus: Urban
- Website: garwarecollege.mespune.in
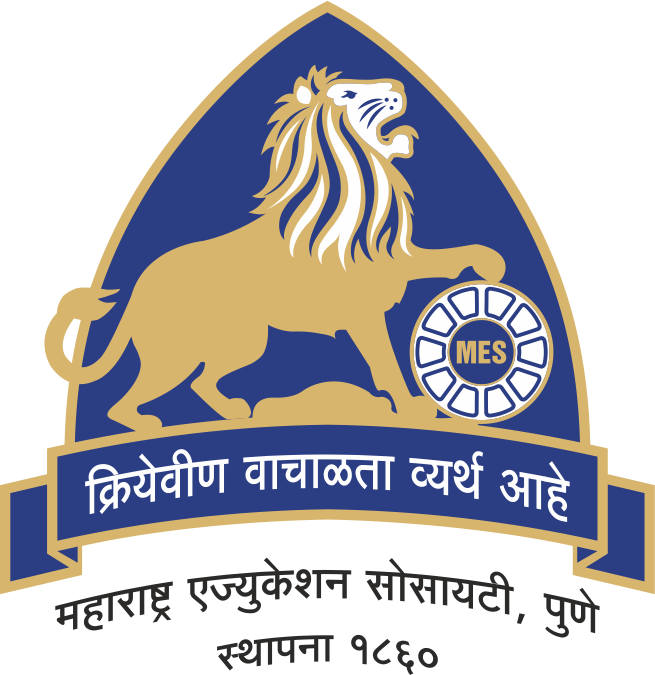

Abasaheb Garware College of Arts and Science (commonly referred to as Garware College or AGC) is a college located in Pune, India. It is run by the Maharashtra Education Society, a private education institution founded by Vasudeo Balwant Phadke, Vaman Prabhakar Bhave and Laxman Narhar Indapurkar in 1860. The college was established in 1945 and named as "M.E.S College of Arts and Science". It was later renamed to its present name in the 1970s after a charitable donation by the industrialist Abasaheb Garware to the society.

Garware College offers HSC (10 + 2) courses, along with Bachelors, Masters and PhD programs in Arts and Science. Approximately 5000 students study in this college.

== Admissions and Programs ==
Garware College is an Arts and Science college. The college offers 11th & 12th grade studies (10+2) as well as undergraduate and postgraduate programs in the fields listed below. Admissions for HSC courses are done through the Maharashtra FYJC allotment list, which in turn depends upon the SSC and CBSE results of the concerned candidates. Admissions for graduate and undergraduate courses can be done via their official website.

=== Bachelor of Arts ===
- BA in English
- BA in Marathi
- BA in Hindi
- BA in History
- BA in Economics
- BA in Sociology
- BA in Geography
- BA in Political Science
- BA in Psychology

=== Master of Arts ===
- MA in English
- MA in Hindi
- MA in History
- MA in Economics
- MA in Political History
- MA in Psychology
- MA in Journalism and Mass Communications

=== PhD in Arts ===
- PhD in Economics
- PhD in Hindi

=== Bachelor of Science ===
- BSc in Botany
- BSc in Zoology
- BSc in Biotechnology
- BSc in Microbiology
- BSc in Chemistry
- BSc in Physics
- BSc in Mathematics
- BSc in Statistics
- BSc in Electronic Sciences
- BSc in Computer Sciences
- BSc in Cyber Security
- Bachelors in Computer Applications

=== Master of Science ===
- MSc in Organic chemistry
- MSc in Analytical chemistry
- MSc in Biotechnology
- MSc in Biodiversity
- MSc in Microbiology

=== PhD in Science ===
- PhD Chemistry
- PhD Electronic Science
- PhD Microbiology
- PhD Mathematics
- PhD Physics
- PhD Environmental Science

== Campus and Facilities ==
=== Public Transport ===
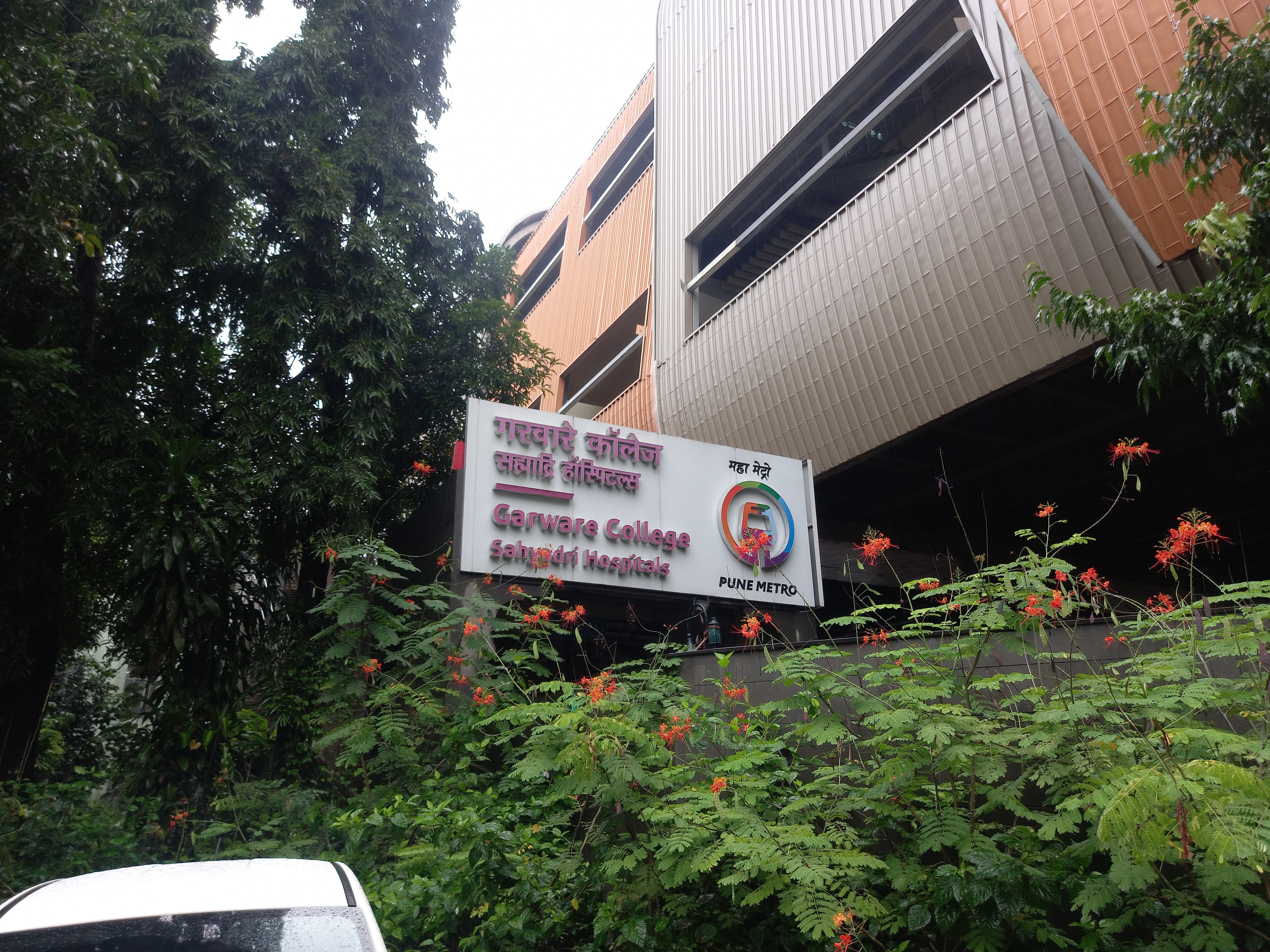
Garware College Metro Station

Abasaheb Garware College features several modes of Public Transport, supported by Infrastructure such as Bus Stops and the Garware College Metro Station, an elevated metro station on the east–west corridor of the Aqua Line of the Pune Metro, which was opened to the public on 6 March 2022.

=== Infrastructure ===
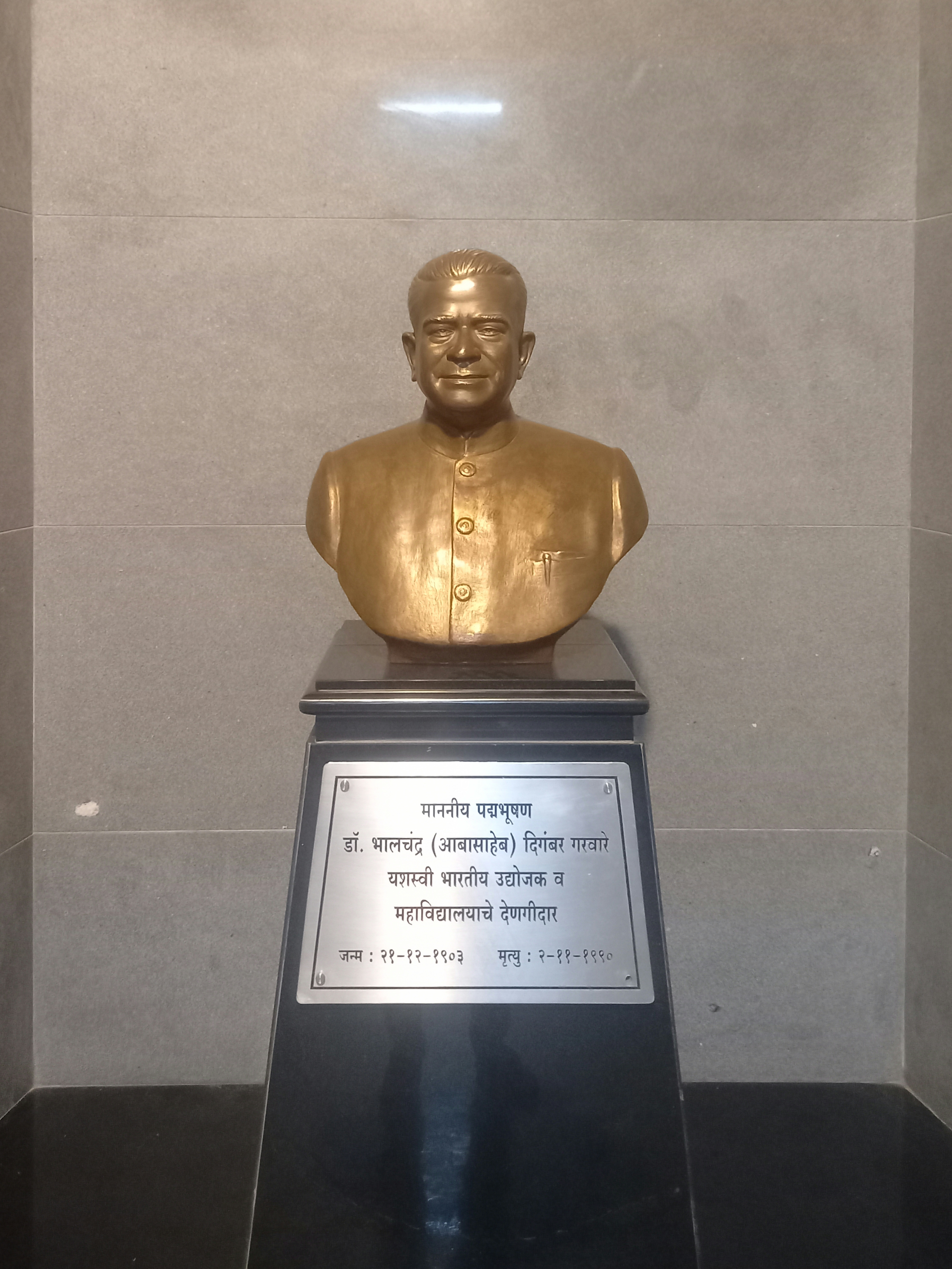
A Statue of Abasaheb Garware on the Ground floor of the Main Building

The campus consists of the Main Building, the Circular Building, the Botanical Garden, the College Ground, and the girls and boys hostels. A new Platinum Jubilee building is under construction. The Main Building Houses Several Departments like Physics, Botany, Zoology and Chemistry- Consisting of Laboratories and Classrooms. The College Office, as well as the Staff Room are Situated here.

=== Library ===
The AGC Library was started in 1945 along with the establishment of the college and caters to the academic and research needs of the disciplines of both Arts and Science faculties. The 'Bachelor of Library and Information Science' course was started in 1992. Later, looking at the increasing demand of the students, the 'Master of Library and Information Science' course was started in 2009.

=== Facilities for the Differently Abled ===
An audio notice board was set up in the college for the visually impaired in mid-2018, allowing the students to listen to and keep up with college notices and announcements. The audio notice board, consisting of a pair of headphones, and a set of buttons for the students to choose their respective college year to listen to the test-to-speech translation of the notices put up by the college was designed by Nandan Gawte and Ankita Pawar, both former students of AISSM's College of Engineering.
