= Abasaheb Garware =

Industrialist

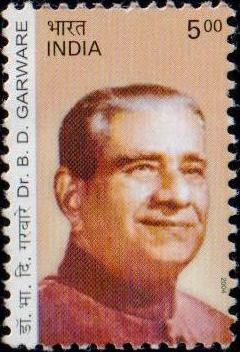
- Garware on a 2004 stamp of India

Sheriff of Bombay
- In office 1959 - 1960
- Preceded by: J.C. Jain
- Succeeded by: Y. A. Fazalbhoy

Personal details
- Born: Bhalchandra Digambar Garware; 21 December 1903 Tasgaon, British India
- Died: 2 November 1990 (aged 86) Pune, Maharashtra, India
- Children: 5
- Occupation: Entrepreneur, businessman
- Awards: Padma Bhushan (1971)

Bhalchandra Digamber Garware (21 December 1903 - 2 November 1990) also known as Abasaheb Garware was an Indian pioneering industrialist from the state of Maharashtra. He was the Founding Chairman of the Garware Group of Industries. He was also appointed as the Sheriff of Bombay from 1959 to 1960. For his overall contribution in Business and Industries he was awarded Padma Bhushan, the third-highest civilian award in India, in 1971.

== Early life ==
Abasaheb Garware was born in Tasgaon in Satara district of Bombay Presidency on 21 December 1903. He faced poverty since his father wasted away all the family wealth and incurred large amount of debts. Due to the financial position at home he was forced to leave education after passing the then 6th Standard High School exam.

== Struggle and rise in second-hand car market ==
After initial struggle in Mumbai he started an automobile business for his livelihood which made some decent earnings for him. During this time since he was in automobile business he got an idea of the potential for a second-hand car market. He then started working as an agent for selling second-hand cars. Eventually with his entrepreneurship and hard work he established his "Deccan Motor Agency" in Girgaon, in south Mumbai (then Bombay) and earned repute as a reliable dealer in cars. He also got into the business of selling spares, accessories, tyres, etc.

In 1933, Abasaheb decided to go to England since second-hand cars were cheap in England then. In London he not only dealt with second hand cars but he also purchased firms from businessmen taking advantage of recession. This move brought him good profits. His move of buying cars in England helped him to get a good grip on the second-hand car business.

== Entry into plastic industry ==
He showed his business acumen once again when he entered the Plastic Industry. He identified Plastic Industry as an upcoming industry and hence he entered it. He started manufacturing Plastic buttons for the Navy during the 2nd World War.

Eventually he got into a number of ventures related to Plastic industry like Nylon Yarn, Nylon Bristles, fishing nets, Polyester Films, Synthetic Ropes, Plastic injection molding and blow molding, etc. He had a good success due to his keenness of quality.

== Contributions to social cause ==
Abasaheb was an entrepreneur who put into practice Gandhiji’s precepts of trusteeship for the good of workers. He attributed his success to his team. He decided to pay back his earnings to Society to distribute his profit towards social causes like health, education etc. He also made numerous donations for schools and colleges, laboratories, libraries, gymnasia, etc. Annual Scholarships and awards were also instituted by him to promote academic excellence among students.

He founded about seventy five Trusts for pursuing various charitable objectives.

His contributions in the field of education has also been invaluable. Due to his efforts a number of Educational Institutions were set up such as the University of Bombay’s Garware Institute of Career Education and Development and Smt. Mathubai Garware College for women at Sangli. His charitable donations to the Maharashtra Education Society, Pune led to that organization renaming its colleges and a school as the Abasaheb Garware College, the Abasaheb Garware college of Commerce and Smt. Vimlabai Garware High school respectively.

== Awards and honours ==
He was appointed as Sheriff of Mumbai in 1959. He was also chosen to lead institutions like the State Bank of India, Maharashtra State Financial Corporation and many delegations to foreign countries. The Government of India bestowed on him the Padma Bhushan award in 1971. He was also awarded the Udyog Ratna by the Institute of Economic Studies in 1989. He received an honorary D.Litt. Degree from the University of Pune in 1989. The Department of Posts of India honored Abasaheb Garware with a commemorative postage stamp in 2004.

== Bibliography ==
- McDaniel, Alonzo Simpson (1990). The Absorption of Hydrocarbon Gases by Non-aqueous Liquids. University of Wisconsin--Madison.
