= Paddle plant =

Paddle plant or flapjacks may refer to:

- Kalanchoe luciae
- Kalanchoe thyrsiflora
