= Flapjack =

Flapjack may refer to:

== Food ==
- Flapjack (oat bar), a sweet tray-baked bar in British and Commonwealth cuisine
- Pancake, a flat cake made from batter, sometimes known as a "flapjack"

== Organisms ==
- Flapjack lobster (Ibacus peronii), a crustacean that lives in shallow waters around Australia
- Flapjack octopus (Opisthoteuthis californiana), a deep-sea mollusc
- Flapjack (plant) (Kalanchoe luciae and Kalanchoe thyrsiflora), native to South Africa

== Entertainment ==
- The animated series The Marvelous Misadventures of Flapjack

== Other uses ==
- Flapjack, a throw in professional wrestling
- Flapjack River, a tributary of Mattawa Bay of the Gouin Reservoir in La Tuque, Quebec, Canada
- Flying Flapjack, nickname of the Vought XF5U experimental U.S. Navy World War II aircraft

== See also ==
- Flapjax, a computer programming language
