= Helena M. L. Forbes =

Scottish botanist (1900–1959)

- Born: 11 September 1900; Forfar, Scotland
- Died: 5 September 1959 (aged 58); South Africa
- Occupation: Botanist
- Years active: 1919–1955
- Employer: Natal Herbarium

Helena M. L. Forbes (11 September 1900 – 5 September 1959) was a Scottish botanist, plant collector and curator who worked primarily on South African flora.

== Biography ==
Helena Madelain Lamond Forbes was born on 11 September 1900 in Forfar, Scotland. When she was a young child, her parents emigrated to Durban and Forbes childhood was spent there. On 1 July 1919, she joined Natal Herbarium in Durban as a Junior Assistant in the Botany Division. She became responsible for herbarium maintenance and plant identification. From 1936 to 1937, she worked at Kew Gardens as the South African Liaison Officer. She subsequently returned to South Africa, where she joined the National Herbarium in Pretoria in 1938. In 1940 she returned to Natal Herbarium as Curator and stayed in post until her retirement on 10 September 1955. At her retirement she was described as "a stalwart that kept botanical wheels turning at the herbarium". She suffered from rheumatoid arthritis and died on 5 September 1959.

== Research ==
Forbes was recognised as an authority on the flora of the Natal and, whilst she did not publish widely, she did contribute major revisions of two genera: Psoralea and Tephrosia. Work on Psoralea had begun as early in her career as 1923 and in 1934 she began her work on Tephrosia. During her lifetime she published thirty-two plant names, some of which include: the taxon Ophrestia; Kalanchoe albiflora. During her time at the Natal Herbarium she contributed 1400 specimens to the collection, most of which were from the region. Early in her career she worked on the genus Cassia, as well as flora from Isipingo.

=== Eponym ===
The Indian Ocean alga Beckerella helenae is named after Forbes.

=== Selected publications ===
- 'The Genus Psoralea Linn.' in Bothalia (1936).
- 'A further record of the genus azalea in South Africa. A. Alata (sim) h. Forbes.' South African Journal of Science (1939).

The standard author abbreviation H.M.L.Forbes is used to indicate this person as the author when citing a botanical name.
