= Ophrestia =

Scientific classification
- Kingdom: Plantae
- Clade: Tracheophytes
- Clade: Angiosperms
- Clade: Eudicots
- Clade: Rosids
- Order: Fabales
- Family: Fabaceae
- Subfamily: Faboideae
- Tribe: Phaseoleae
- Subtribe: Ophrestiinae
- Genus: Ophrestia; H.M.L.Forbes (1948)

Species
- 14; see text

Synonyms
- Paraglycine F.J.Herm. (1962); Pseudoglycine F.J.Herm. (1962)

Genus of legumes

Ophrestia is a genus of flowering plants in the family Fabaceae. It belongs to the subfamily Faboideae. It includes 14 species native to tropical and southern Africa, Madagascar, and India. At least six species have been described from Zambia.

- Ophrestia antsingyensis Du Puy & Labat
- Ophrestia breviracemosa Verdc.
- Ophrestia digitata (Harms) Verdc.
- Ophrestia hedysaroides (Willd.) Verdc.
- Ophrestia humbertii Du Puy & Labat
- Ophrestia lyallii (Benth.) Verdc.
- Ophrestia madagascariensis (F.J.Herm.) Verdc.
- Ophrestia oblongifolia (E.Mey.) H.M.L.Forbes
- Ophrestia pentaphylla (Dalzell) Verdc.
- Ophrestia radicosa (A.Rich.) Verdc.
- Ophrestia torrei Verdc.
- Ophrestia unicostata (F.J.Herm.) Verdc.
- Ophrestia unifoliolata (Baker f.) Verdc.
- Ophrestia upembae (Hauman) Verdc.
