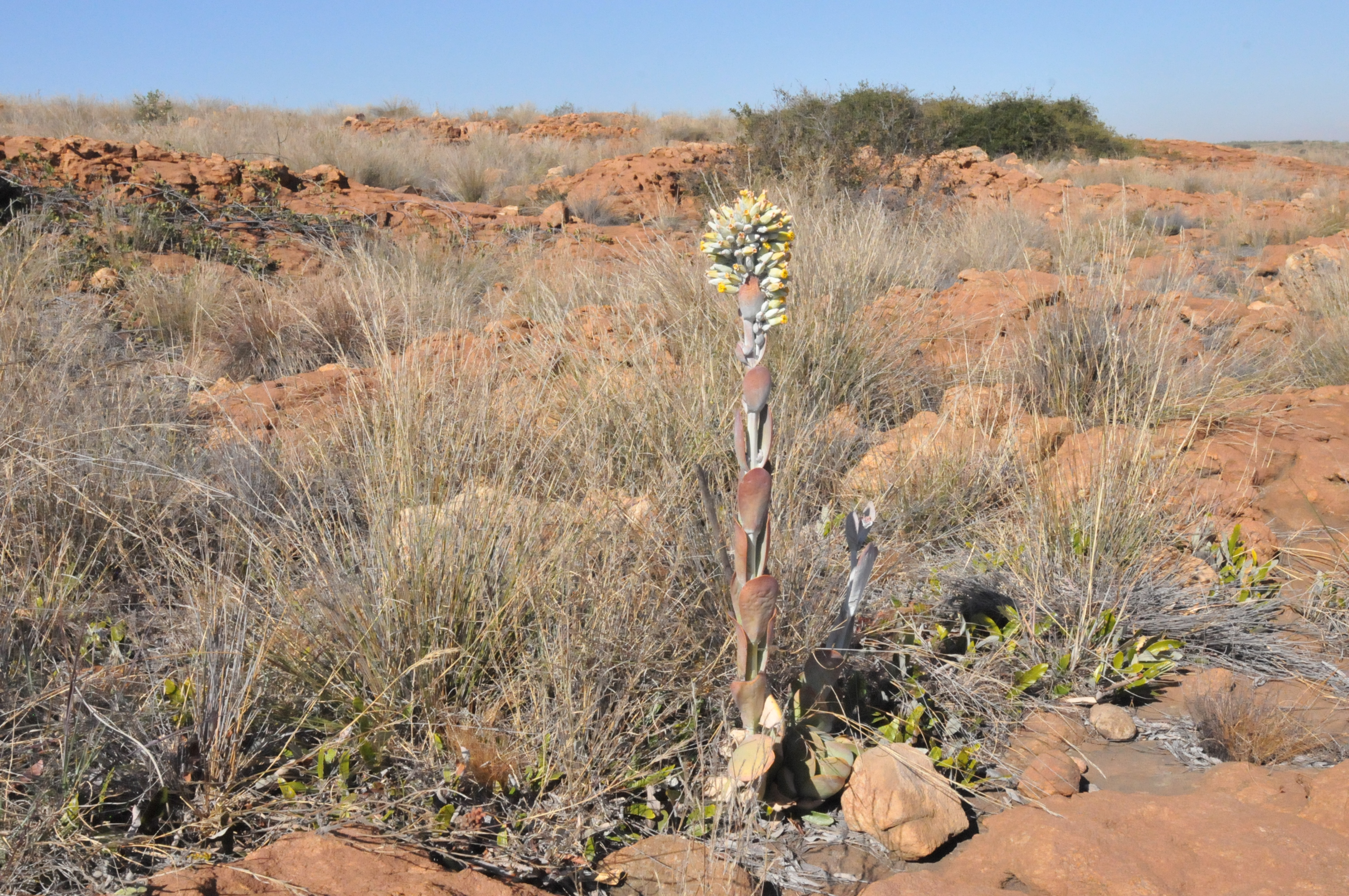
- Kalanchoe thyrsiflora

Scientific classification
- Kingdom: Plantae
- Clade: Tracheophytes
- Clade: Angiosperms
- Clade: Eudicots
- Order: Saxifragales
- Family: Crassulaceae
- Genus: Kalanchoe
- Species: K. thyrsiflora

Binomial name
- Kalanchoe thyrsiflora Harv.

Synonyms
- Kalanchoe alternans Eckl. & Zeyh. ex Harv.

= Kalanchoe thyrsiflora =

Species of succulent

Kalanchoe thyrsiflora (also known as paddle plant, flapjacks, desert cabbage, white lady, geelplakkie, meelplakkie, or plakkie) is a species of flowering plant in the Stonecrop Family (Crassulaceae) and native to Botswana, Lesotho, South Africa and Eswatini. This plant is rare in cultivation, and those plants labelled as "Kalanchoe thyrsiflora" in horticulture are mostly another similar species, Kalanchoe luciae. It is one of the few succulents which flower and fruit once only (monocarpic). A peculiarity of the species is that the round leaves are held in a vertical posture.

== Taxonomy ==
The name Kalanchoe thyrsiflora was first validly published for this southern African species by William Henry Harvey in 1862. Based on an error introduced in The Plant List in 2012, the name K. thyrsiflora has been treated by some as a synonym of K. tetraphylla. However, these two names apply to two distinct species. The name K. tetraphylla dates from 1923 and applies to a different species confined to Madagascar.

== Description ==
It is a succulent plant producing a stalk about 1m tall, which dies back after flowering. It forms a basal rosette of large, rounded, fleshy, stalkless leaves, which are grayish-green with red margins, covered with a white powdery bloom. The inflorescence is terminal and erect with densely clustered thyrse-like panicles of greenish waxy flowers with yellow recurved lobes, narrowly urn-shaped. The plant flowers from autumn to spring, and is common in grassveld amongst rocks.

== Gallery ==
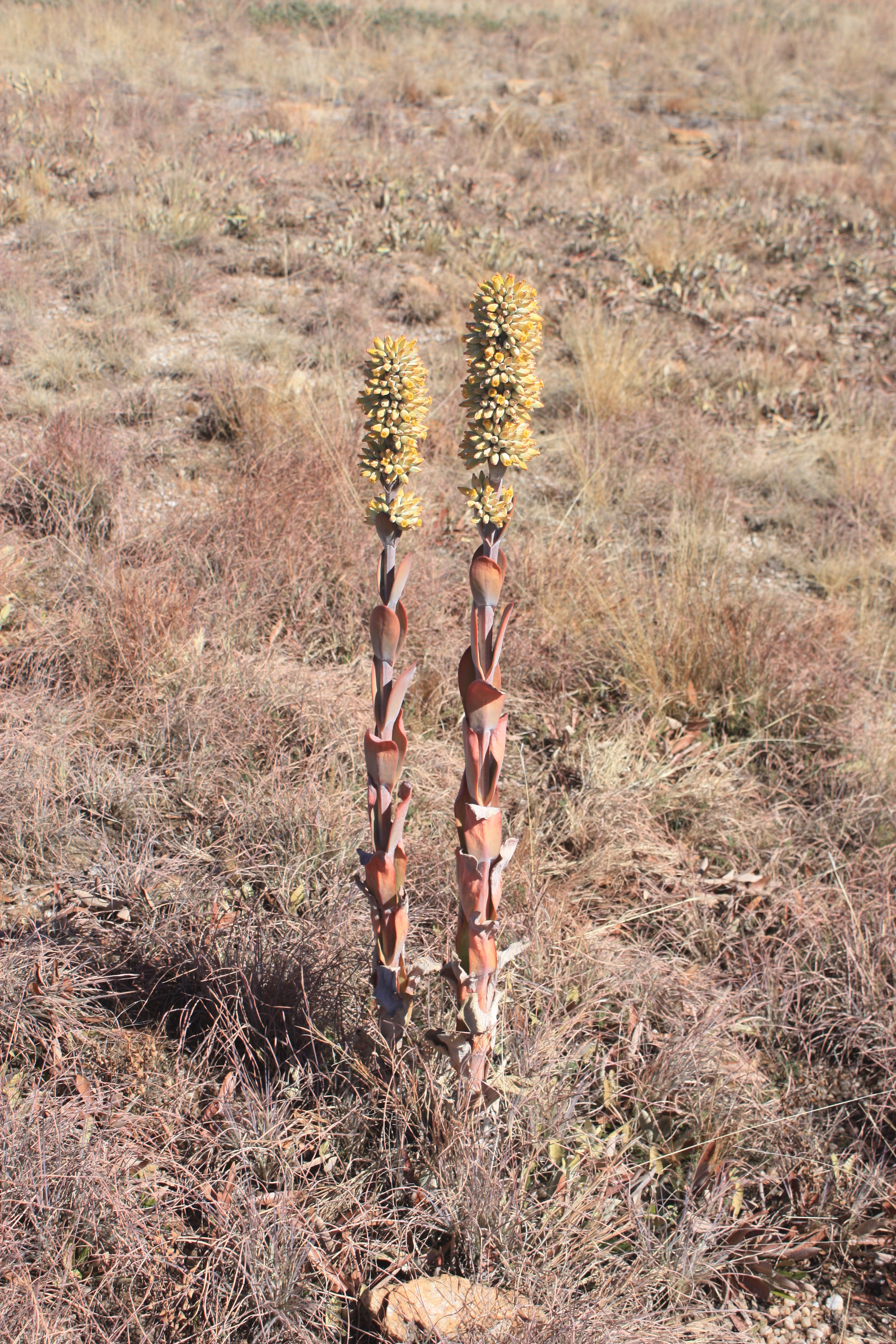
Flowering plant

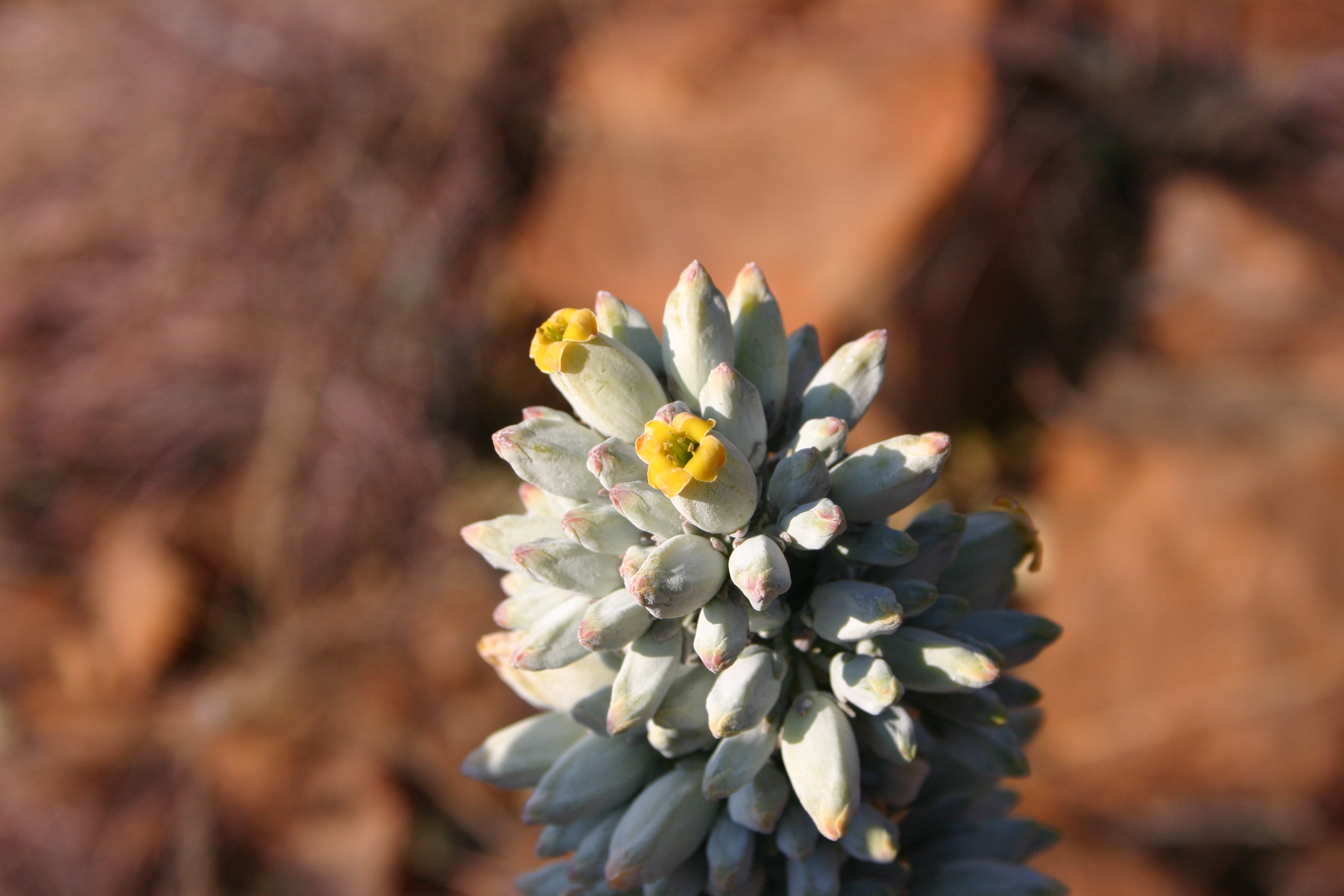
Flowers and buds

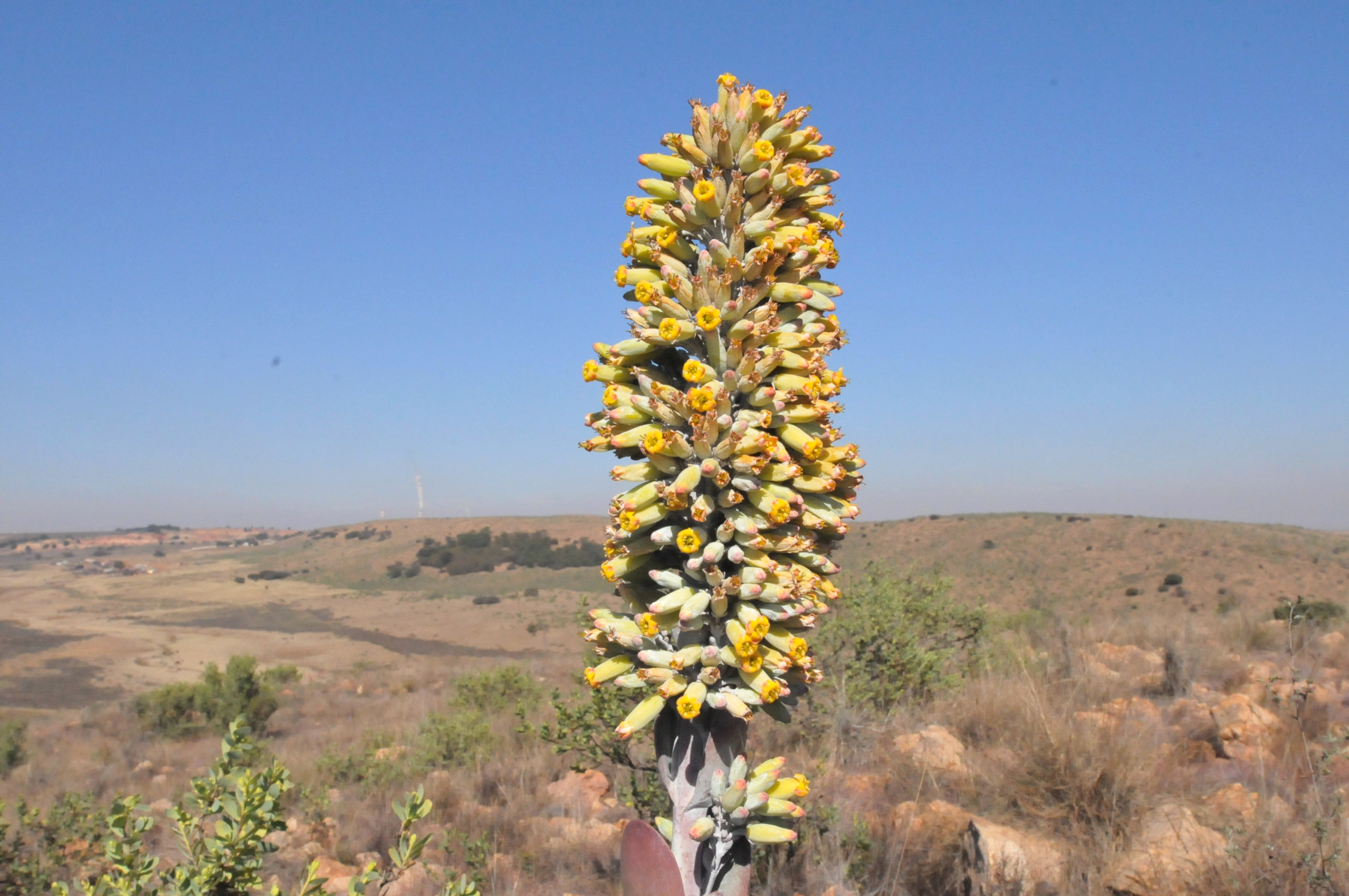
Inflorescence

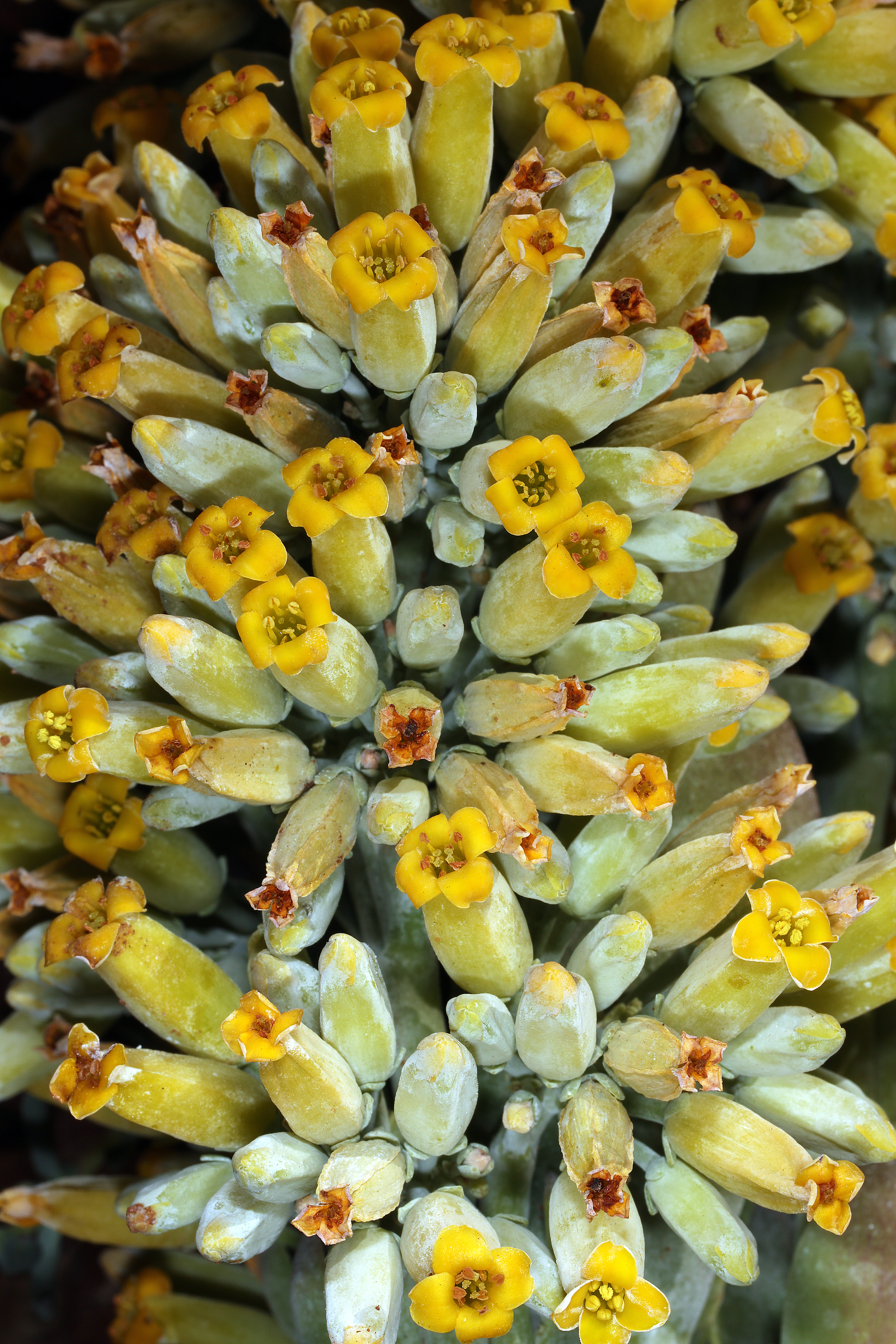
Bunch of flowers

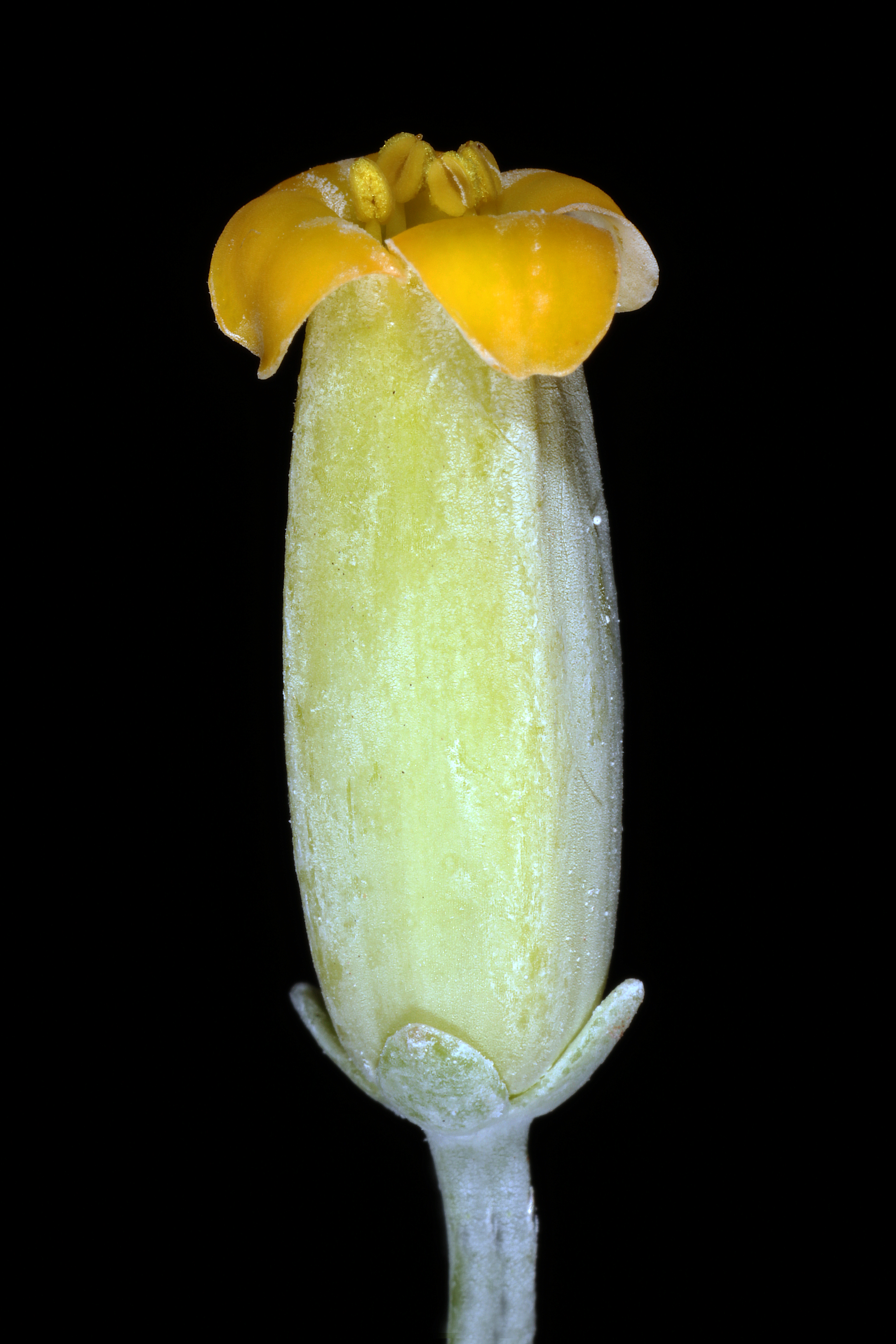
Flower close up
