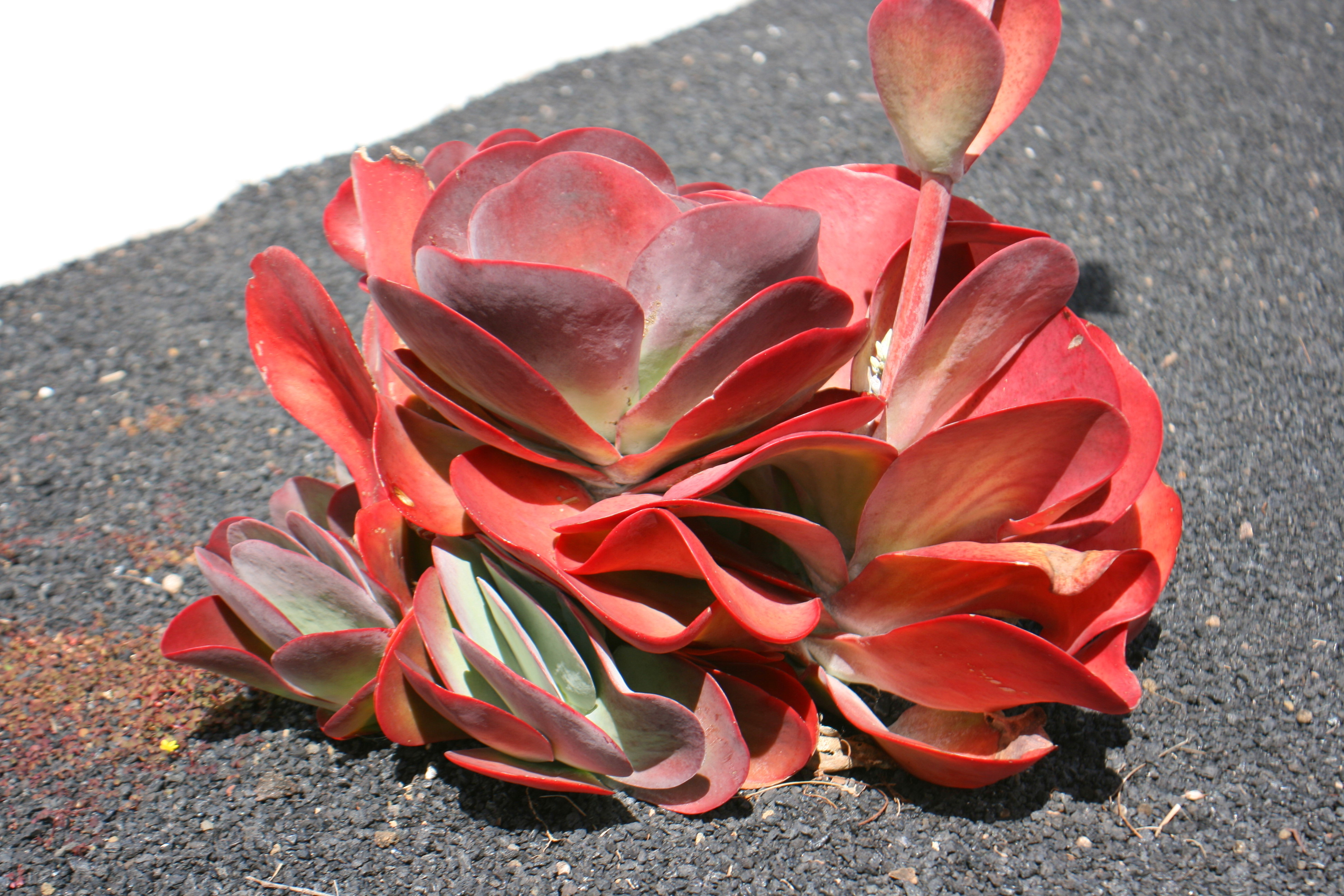

Scientific classification
- Kingdom: Plantae
- Clade: Tracheophytes
- Clade: Angiosperms
- Clade: Eudicots
- Order: Saxifragales
- Family: Crassulaceae
- Genus: Kalanchoe
- Species: K. luciae

Binomial name
- Kalanchoe luciae Raym.-Hamet

Synonyms
- Kalanchoe albiflora H.M.L.Forbes; Kalanchoe aleuroides Stearn

= Kalanchoe luciae =

Species of plant in the genus Kalanchoe

Kalanchoe luciae, the paddle plant or flapjacks, is a species of flowering plant in the genus Kalanchoe, native to northeast South Africa, Eswatini, Mozambique and Zimbabwe. It has gained the Royal Horticultural Society's Award of Garden Merit.

K. luciae is often mistaken for a similar but rarely cultivated species, Kalanchoe thyrsiflora. K. luciae has larger, more vibrant leaves and develops white flowers with no noticeable scent, while K. thyrsiflora has fragrant, yellow flowers.

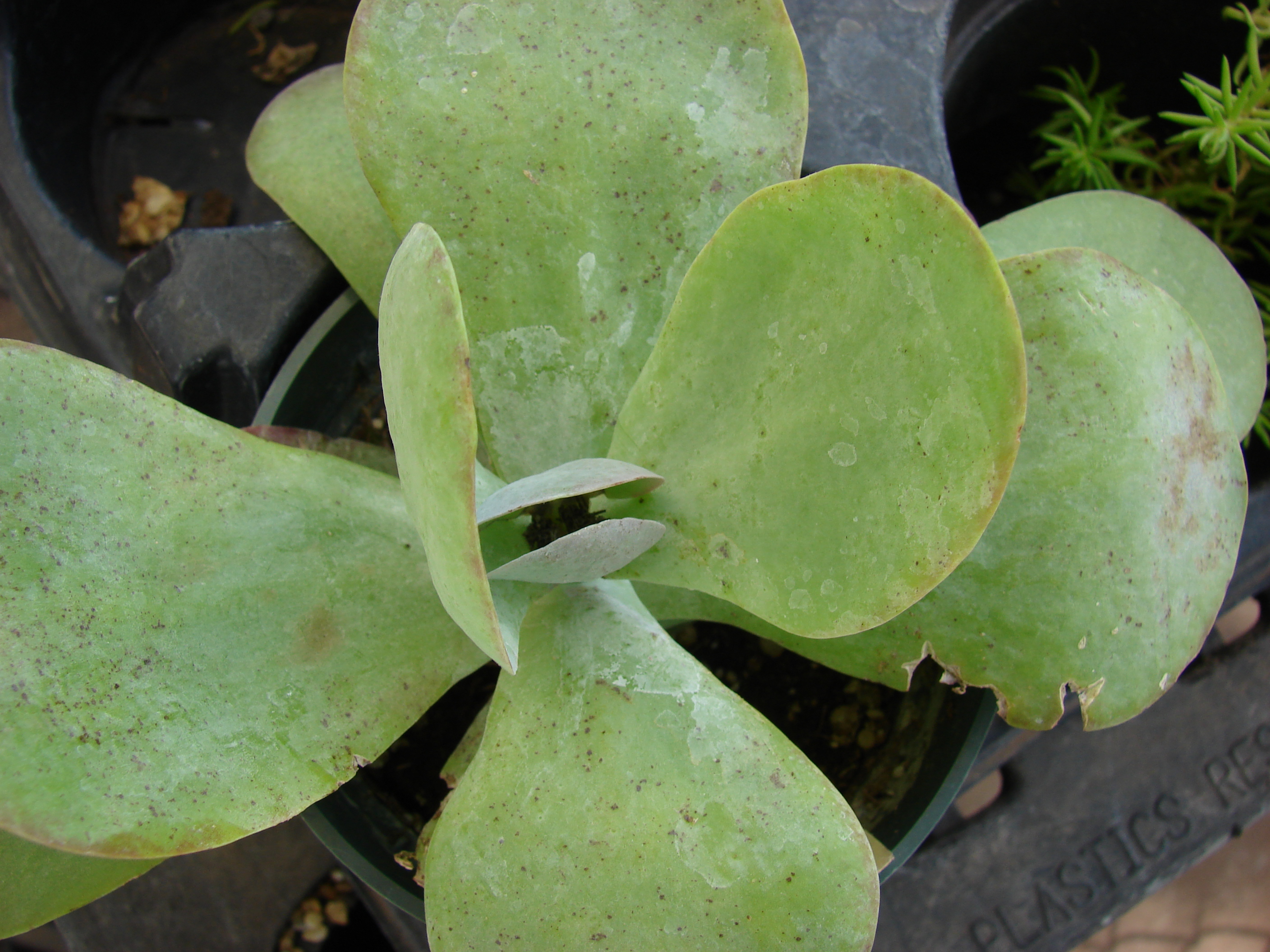

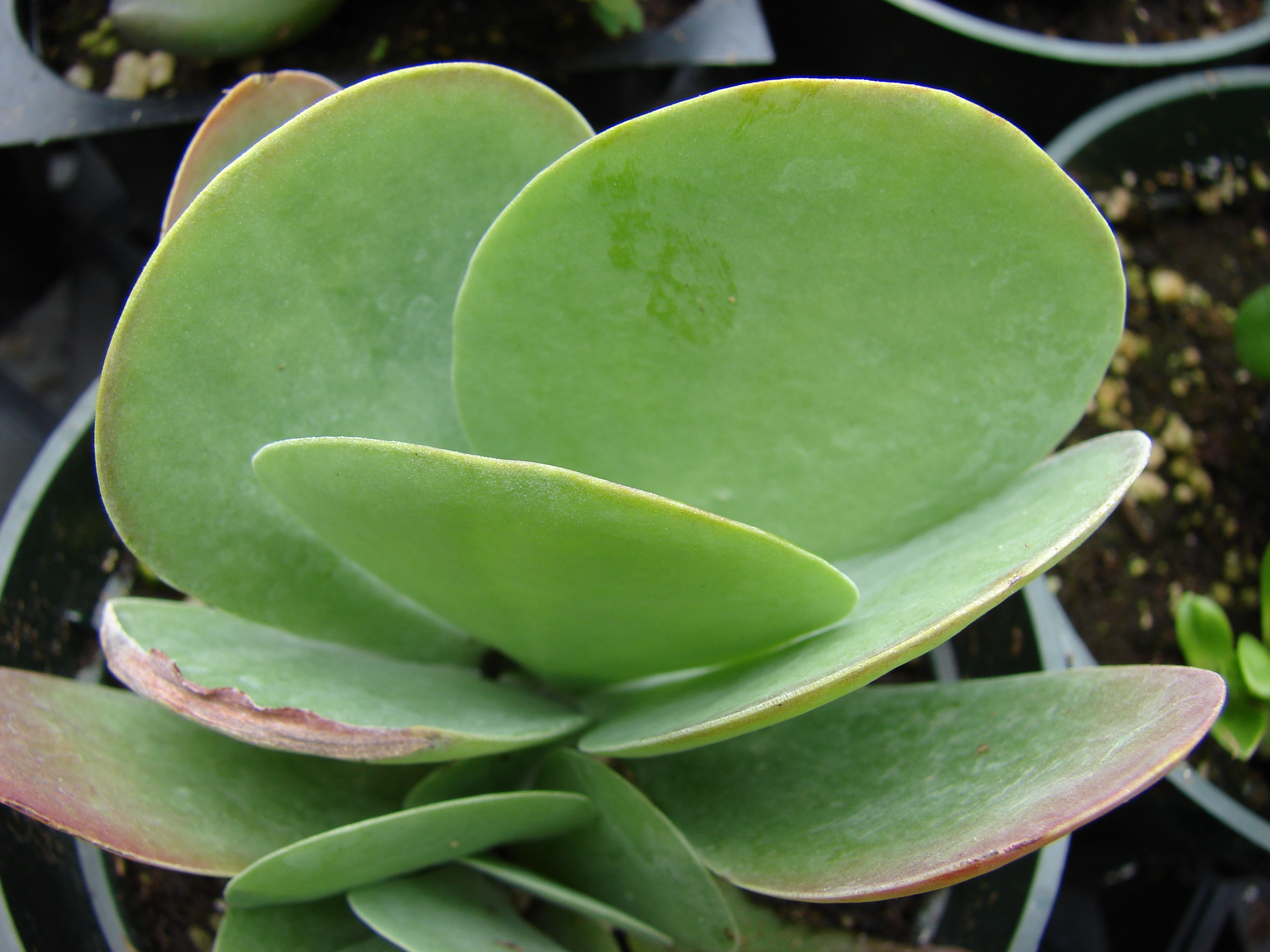

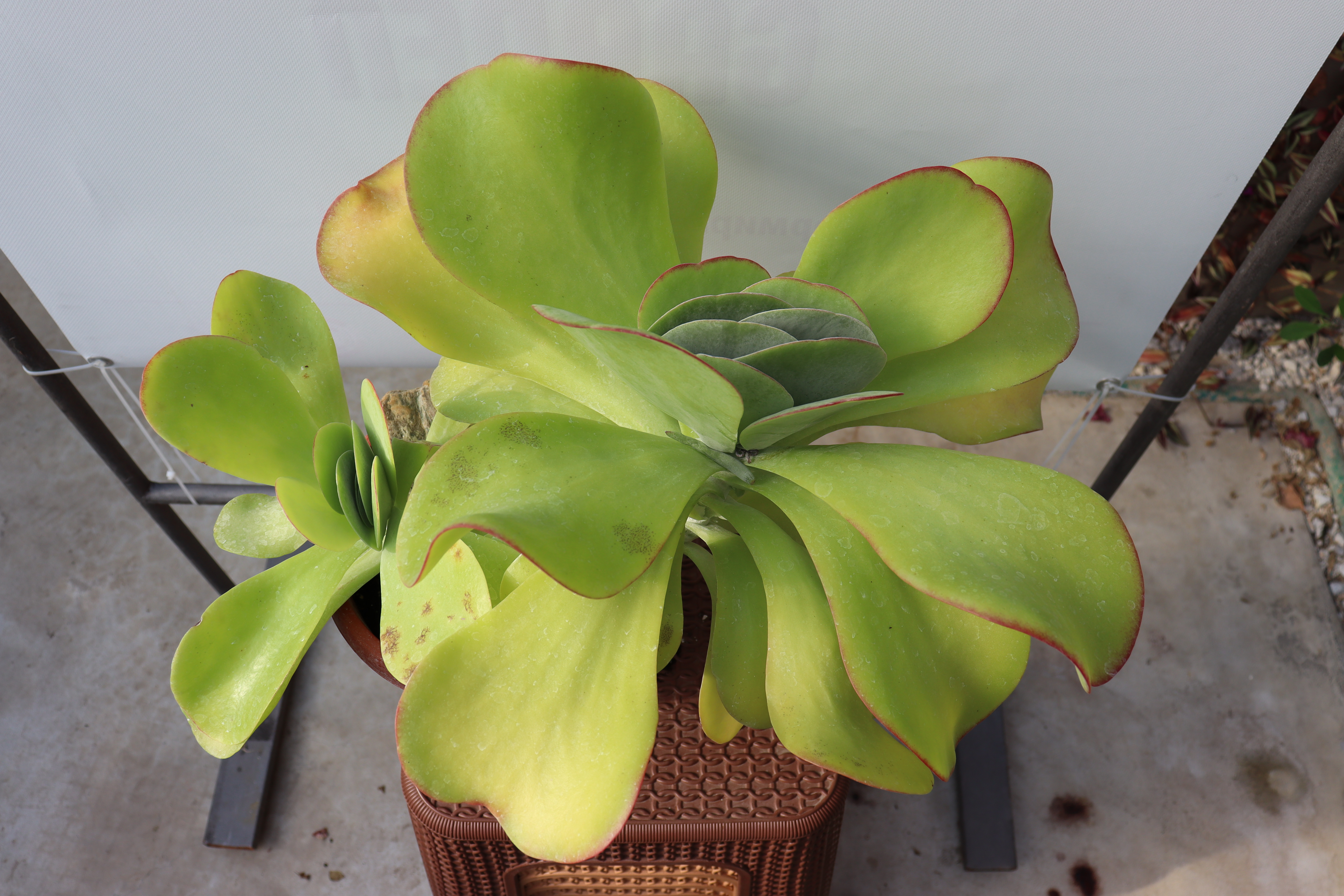

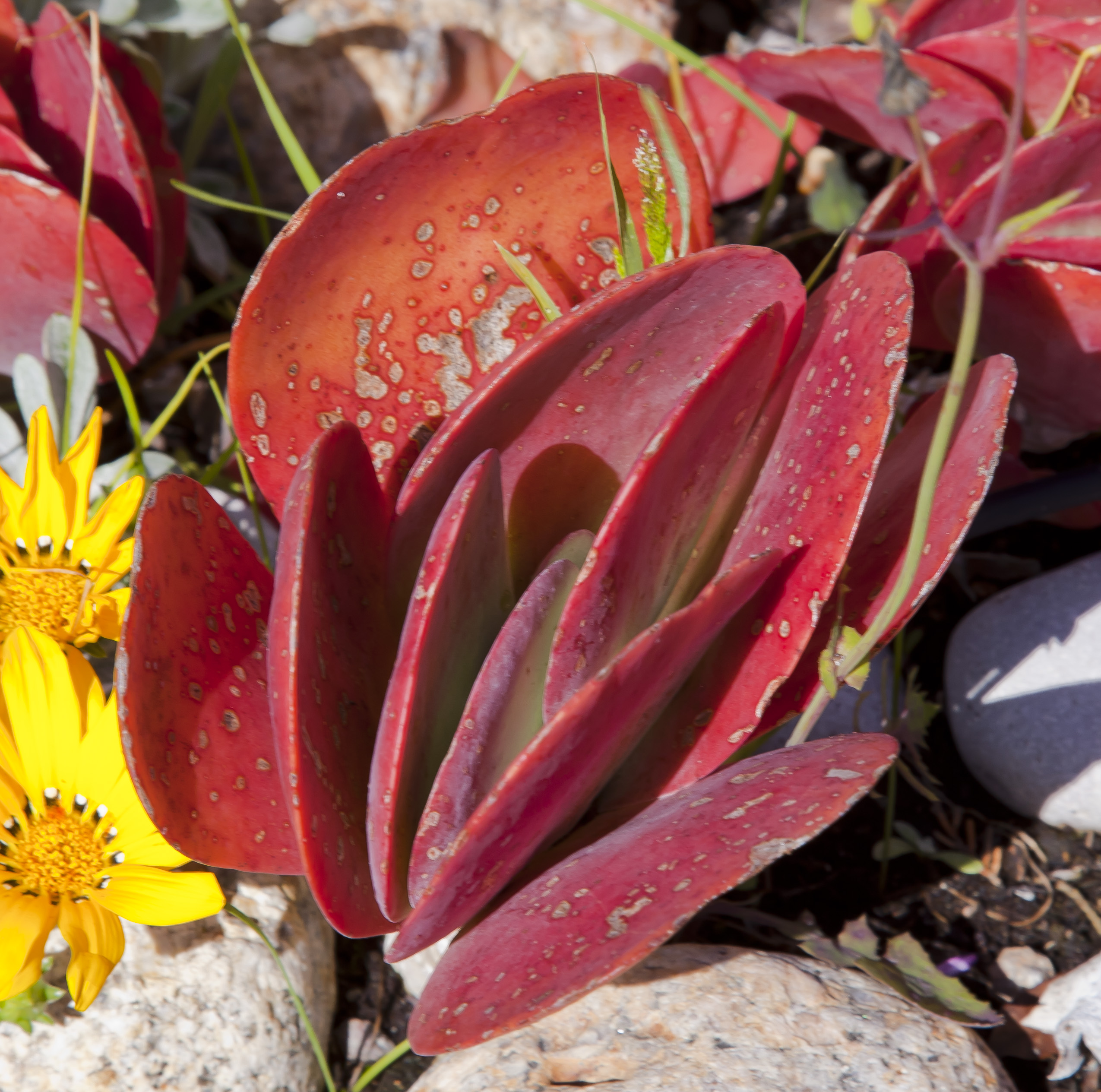

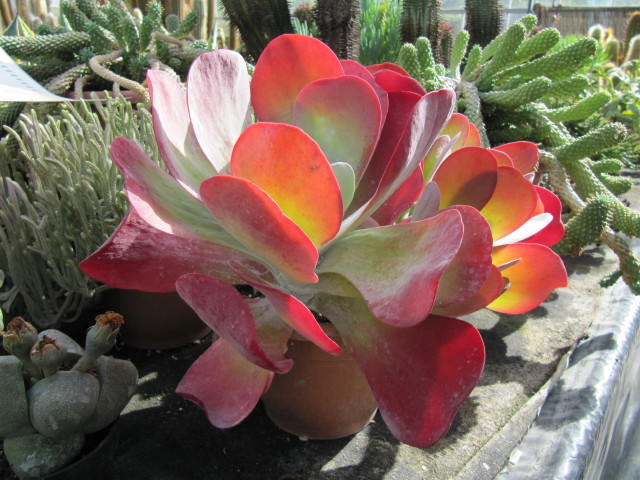

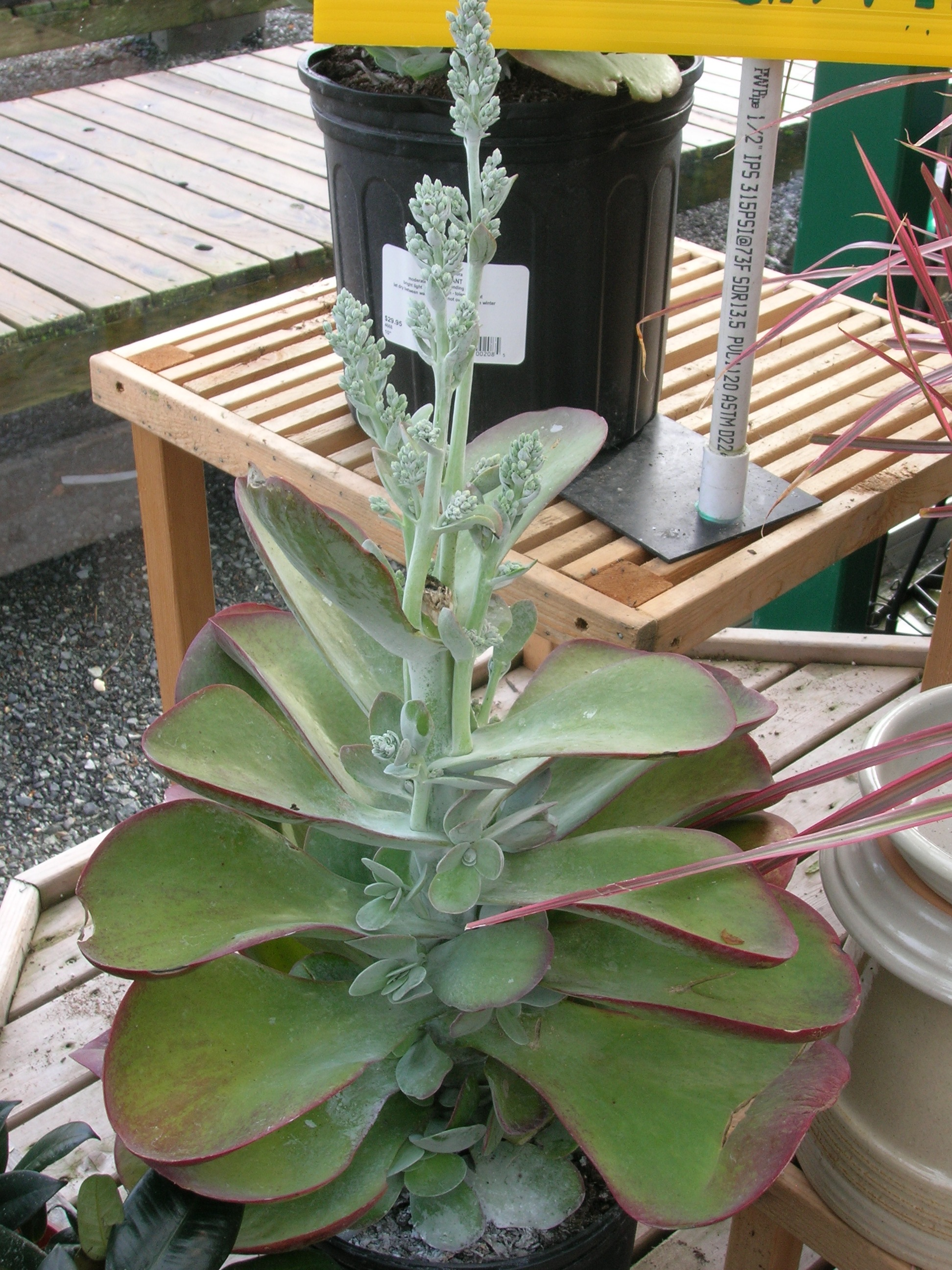

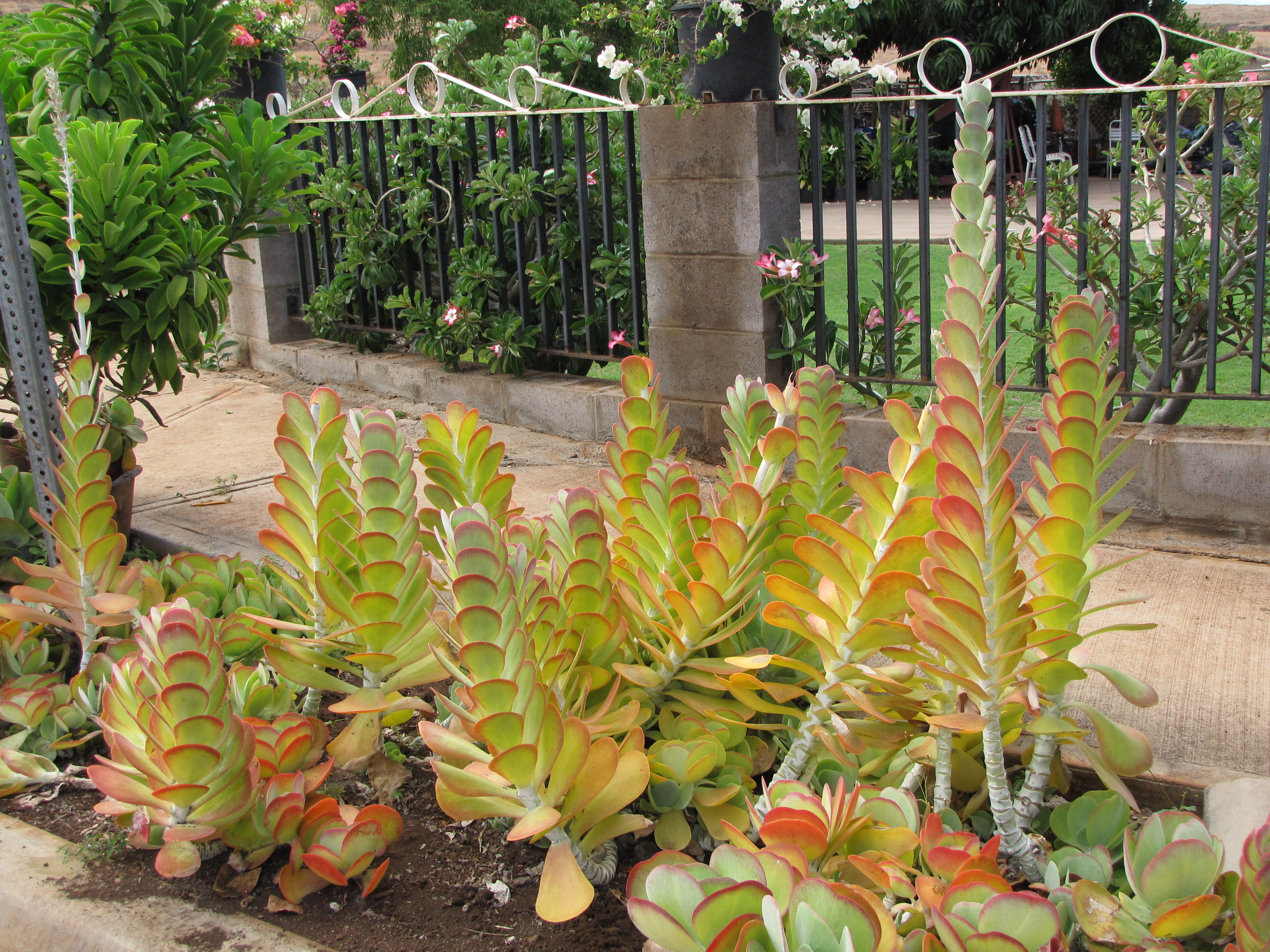

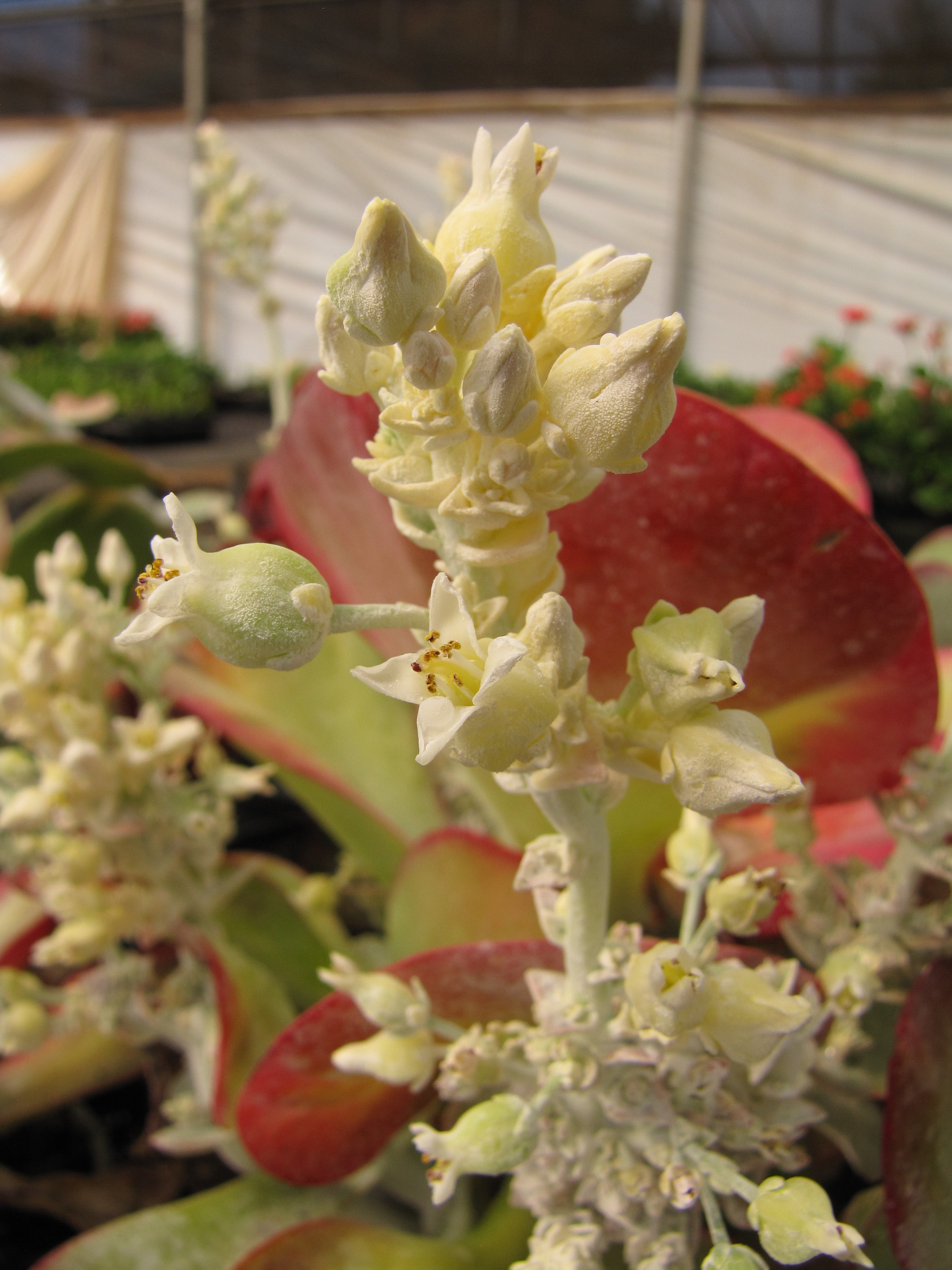

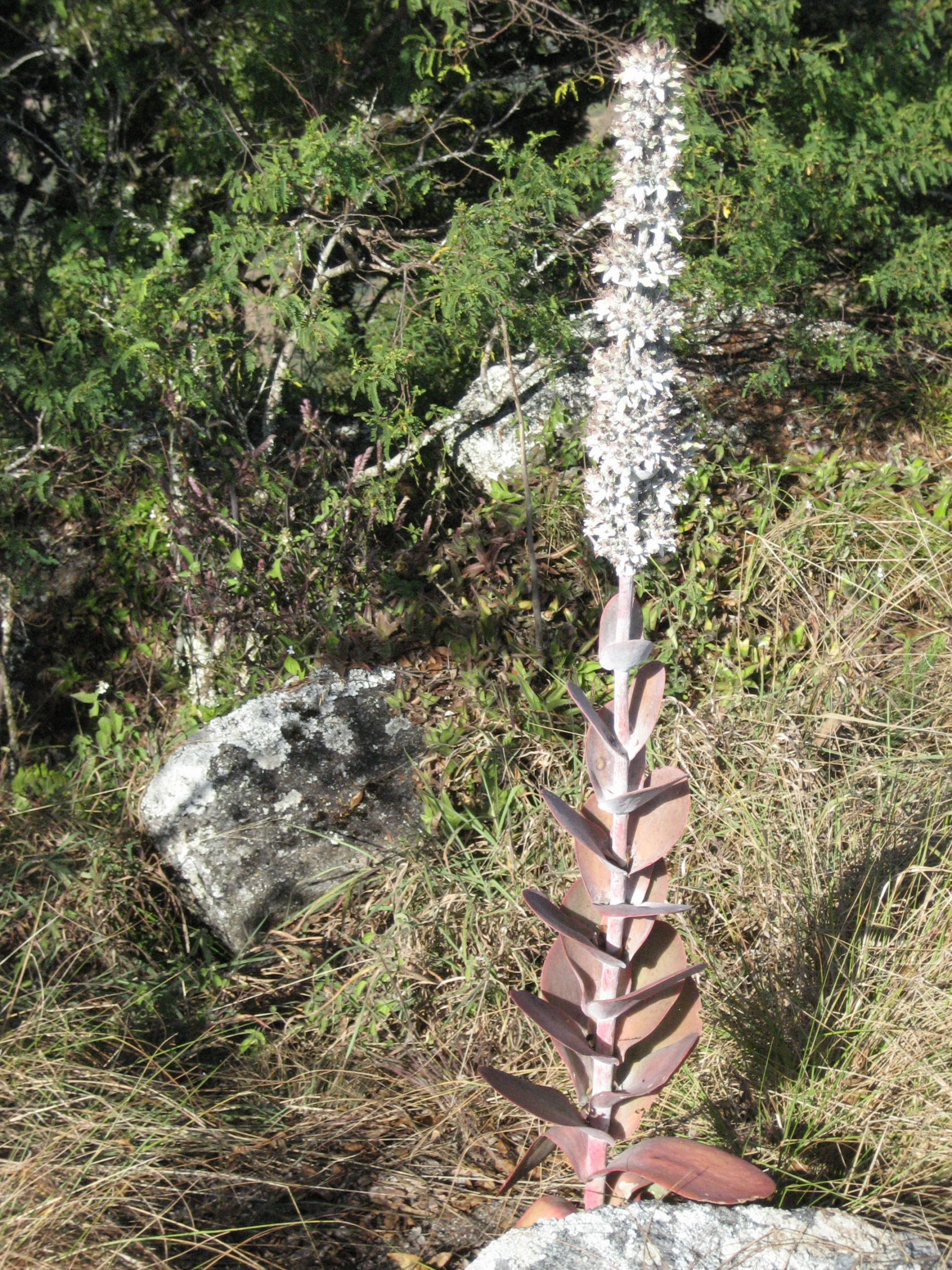

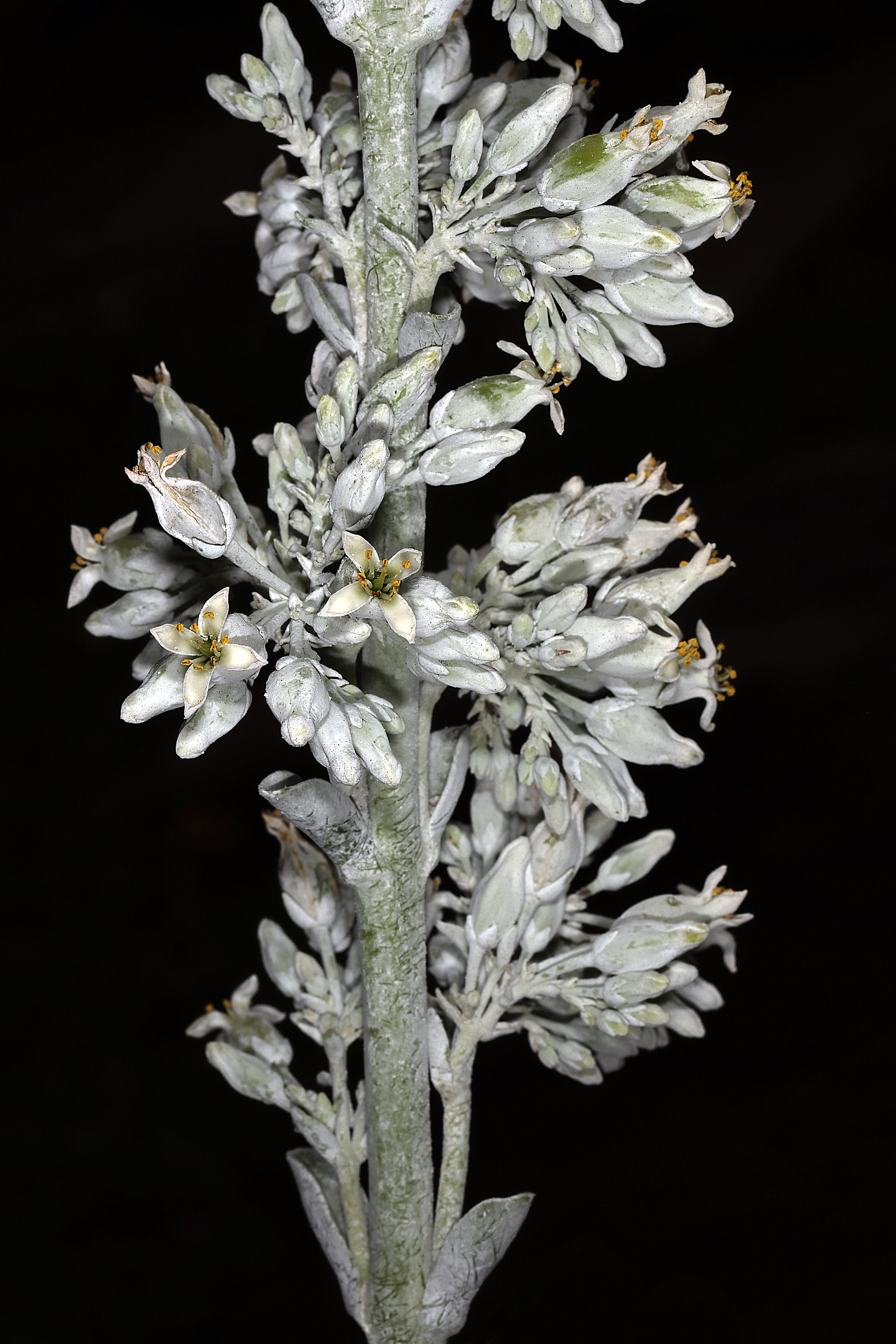

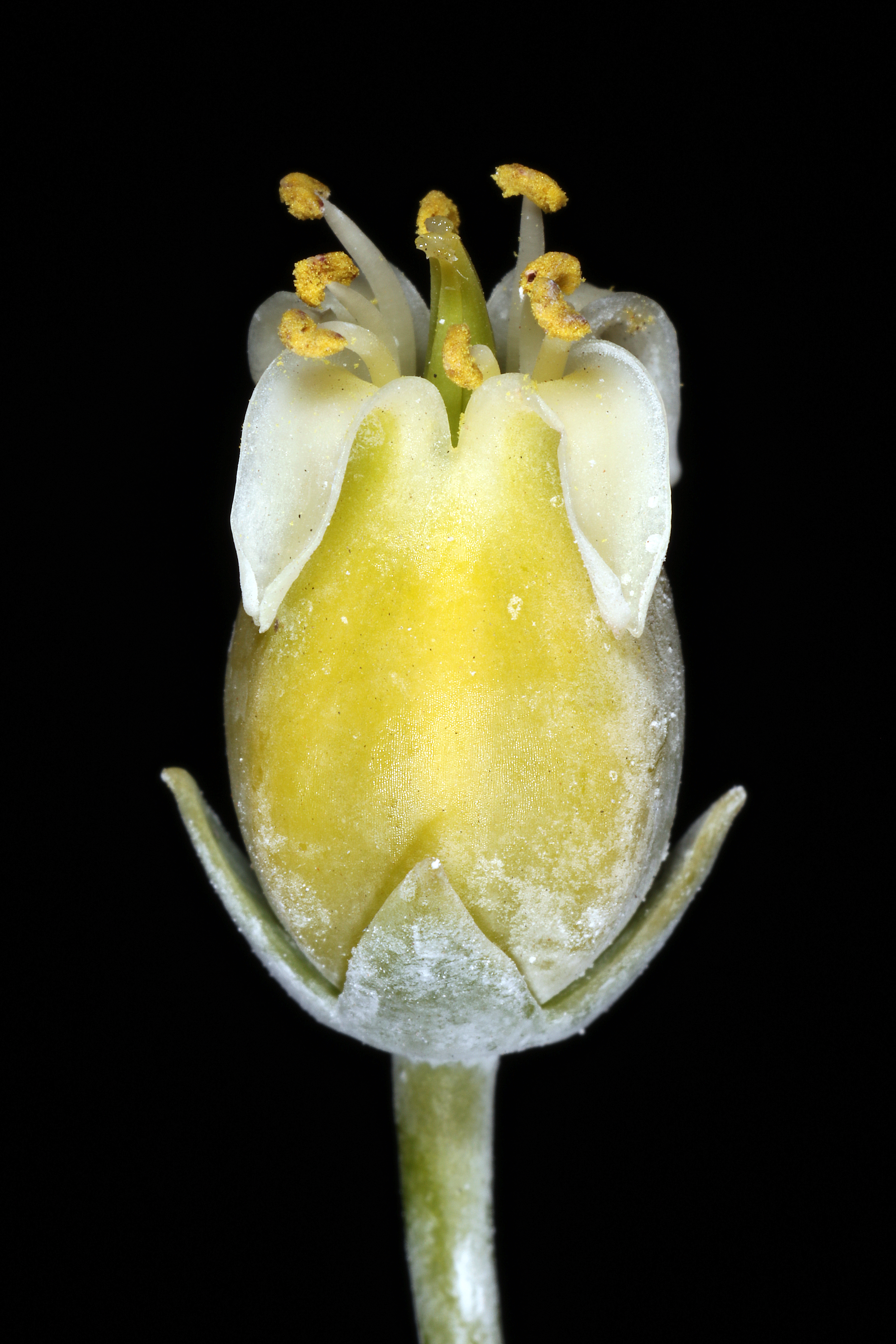

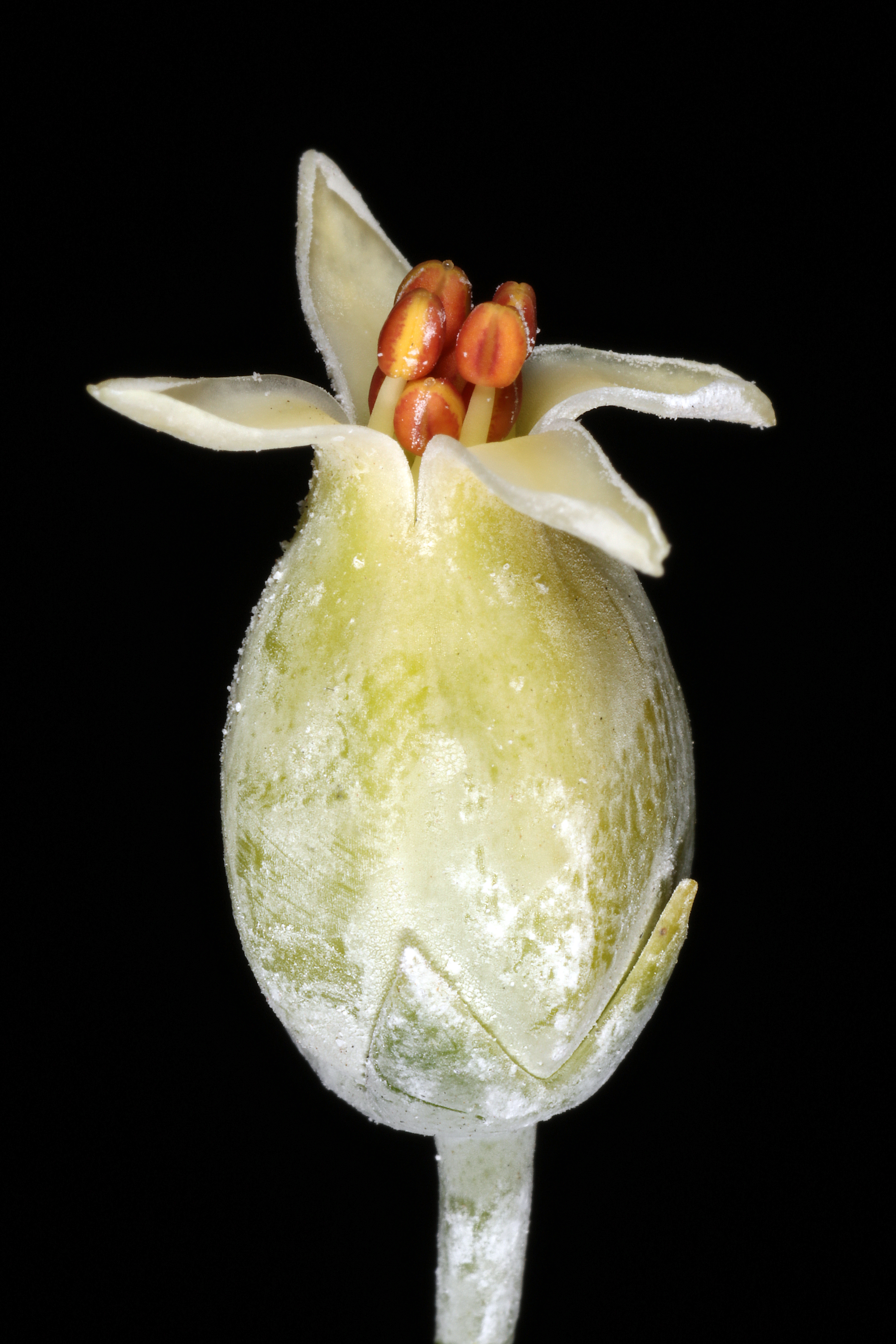
