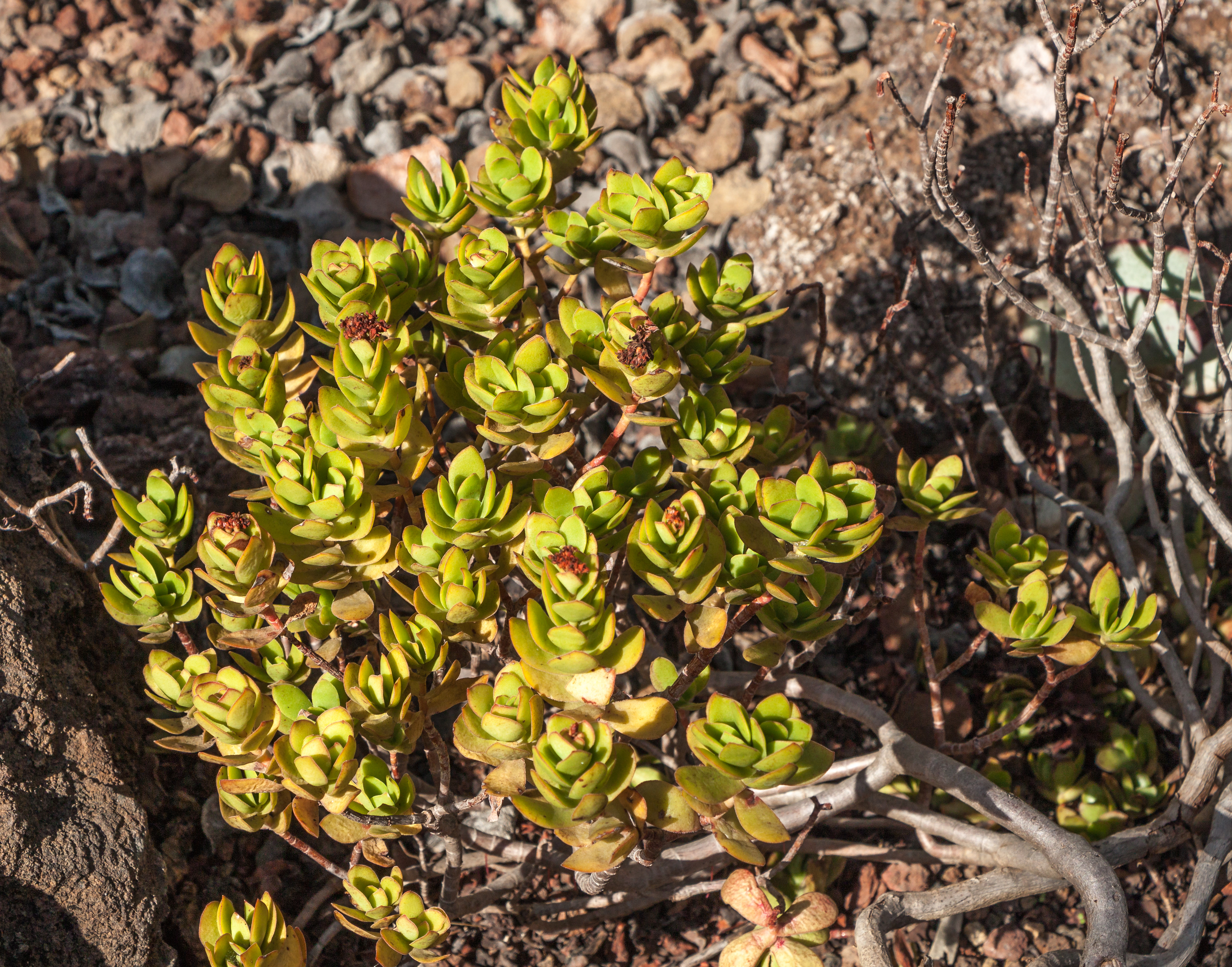
- The small, yellow-ish leaf-blades of Crassula cultrata

Scientific classification
- Kingdom: Plantae
- Clade: Tracheophytes
- Clade: Angiosperms
- Clade: Eudicots
- Order: Saxifragales
- Family: Crassulaceae
- Genus: Crassula
- Species: C. cultrata

Binomial name
- Crassula cultrata L.

= Crassula cultrata =

Sharp-leaved Crassula

Species of plant

Crassula cultrata (Sharp-leaved Crassula) is a succulent plant native to the southern parts of South Africa (the Cape Provinces and KwaZulu-Natal).

== Description ==
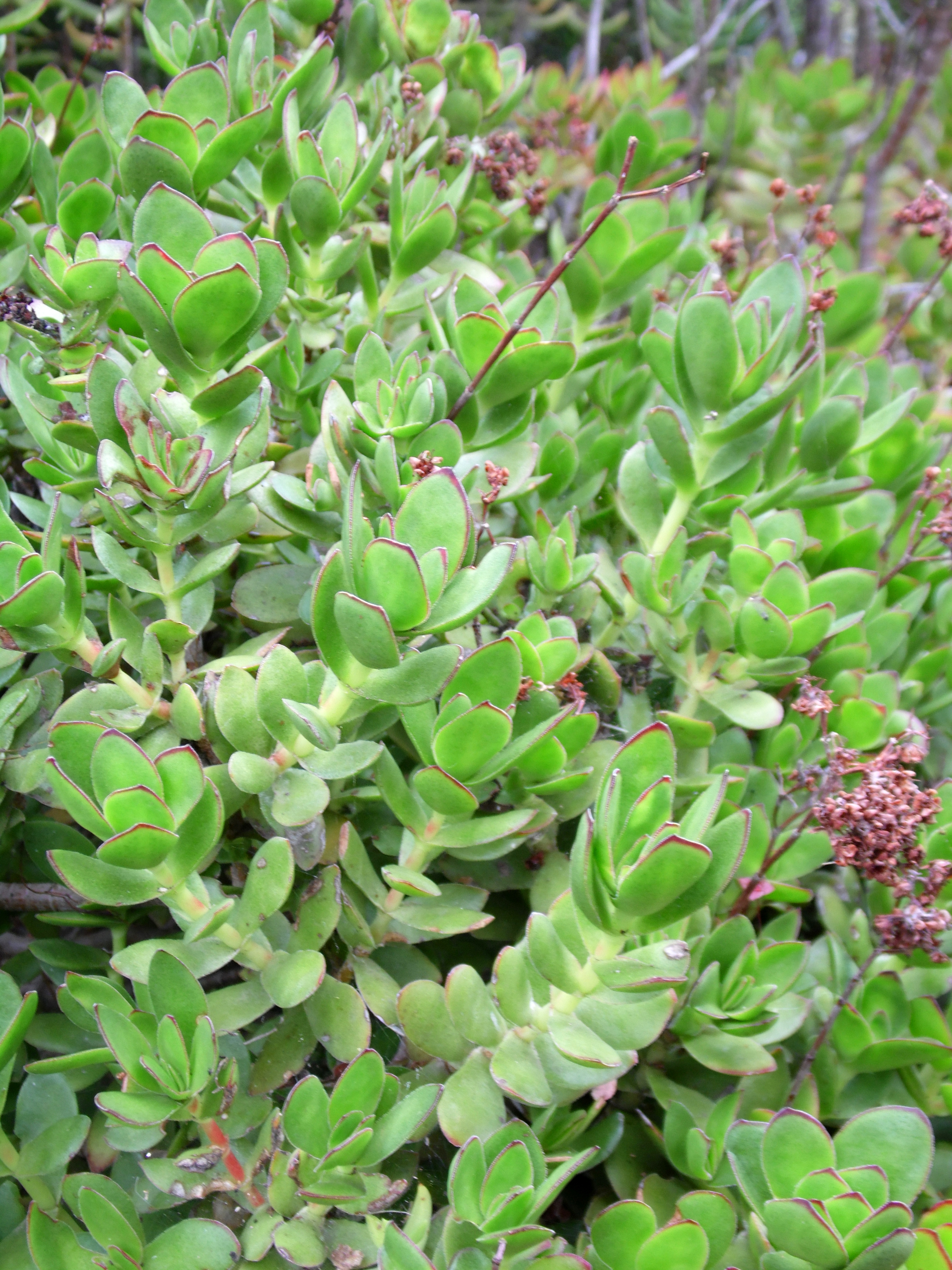
Detail of foliage of a plant in cultivation

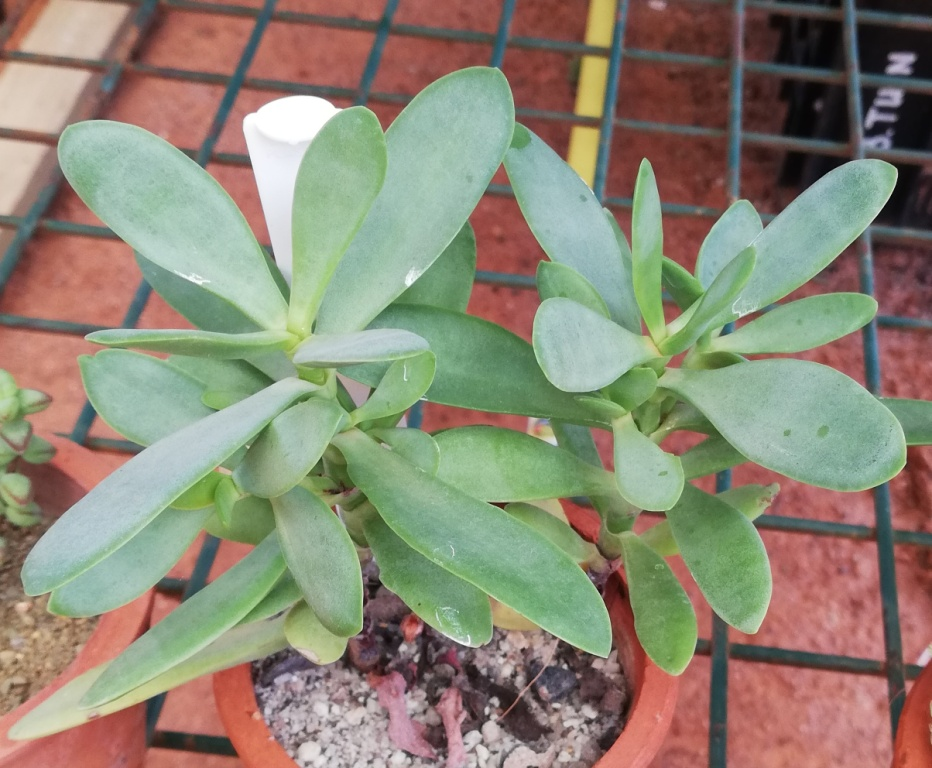
The sharp margins of the ob-lanceolate or knife-shaped ("cultrata") leaves can lose their reddish colour in the shade, as in this large specimen from the Eastern Cape.

A small, erect, branching shrub (20-80 cm in height) with rounded, yellow-green leaves that have sharp, red-brown, cartilaginous margins. The leaf tip is typically rounded or obtuse.

The succulent leaves are flattened, and ob-lanceolate or knife-shaped ("cultrata"). This shape, and the sharp, cartilaginous edges of its leaves, are distinctive.

In December/January it produces elongated flower stems (12-40 cm), each with several loosely-held clumps of yellowish flowers (one of which is terminal). Each flower has black anthers and 3,5-4,5 mm long, cream coloured petals. The loose arrangement of the flowers is a key diagnostic character of this species.

=== Relatives ===
This species is related to Crassula atropurpurea, Crassula subaphylla, Crassula cotyledonis, Crassula pubescens and Crassula nudicaulis. Crassula rogersii, another similar species that is also found in river valleys, is very much smaller, with leaves that are almost cylindrical.

C.cultrata has flattened leaves, twisted to one side of the stem, with a sharp margin.

== Distribution ==
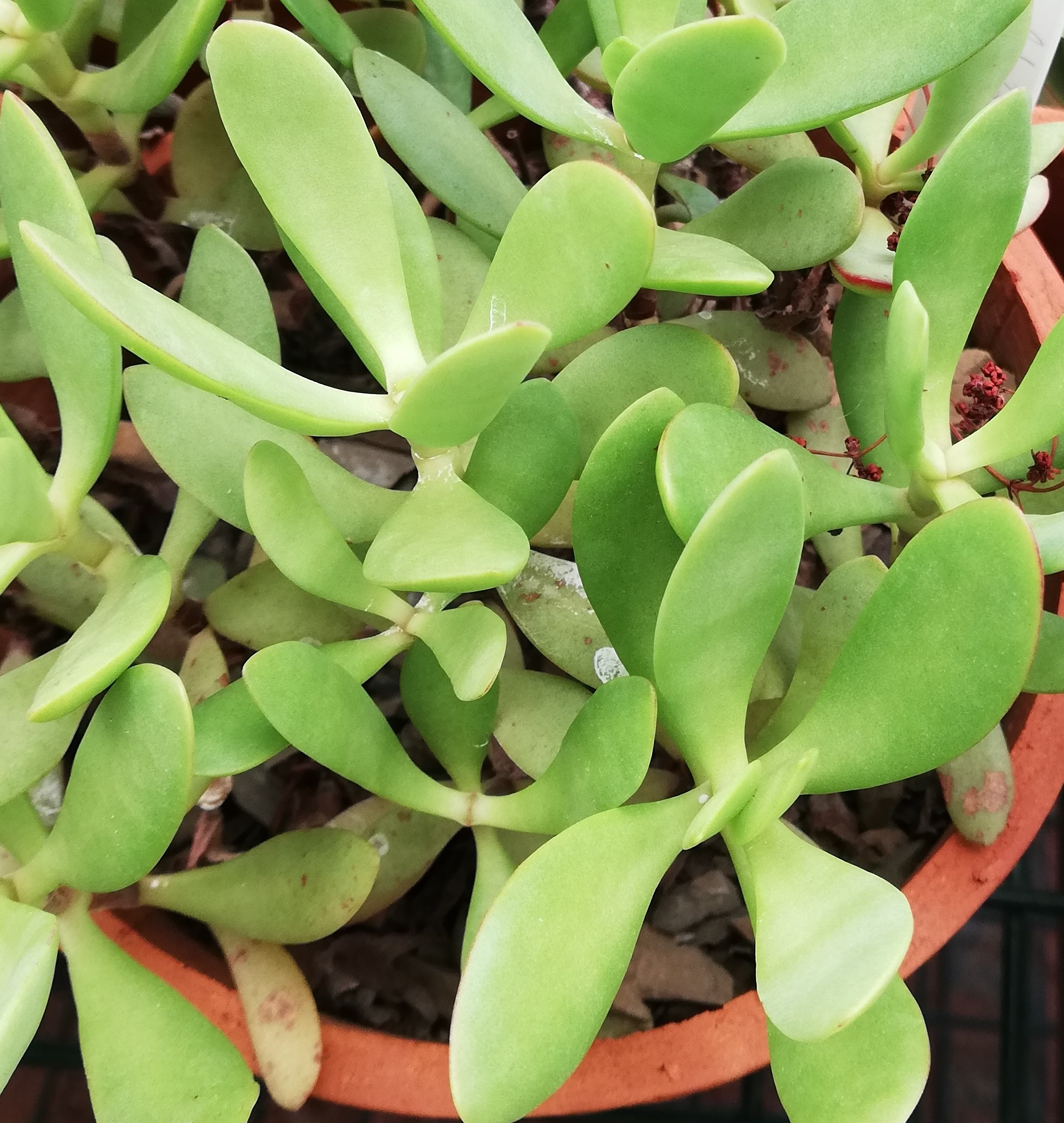
Leaf detail of a specimen from Jansenville.

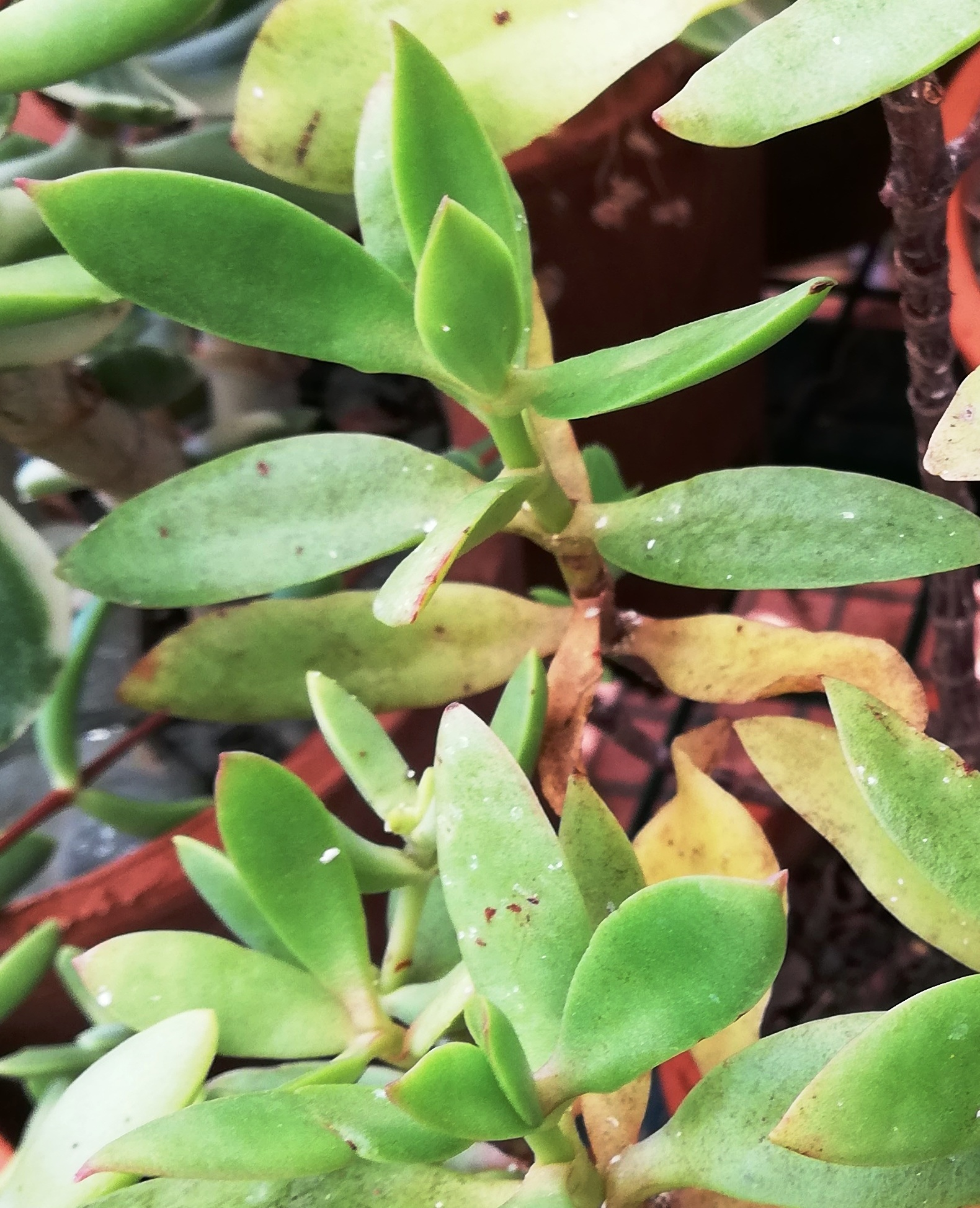
A form with more acute leaf apices

It occurs from near Swellendam and Ladismith in the west, throughout the Little Karoo and Overberg regions, and across the arid parts of the Eastern Cape Province.

Its habitat is usually rocky ridges and outcrops in scrub vegetation, often in river valleys (like Crassula rogersii).
