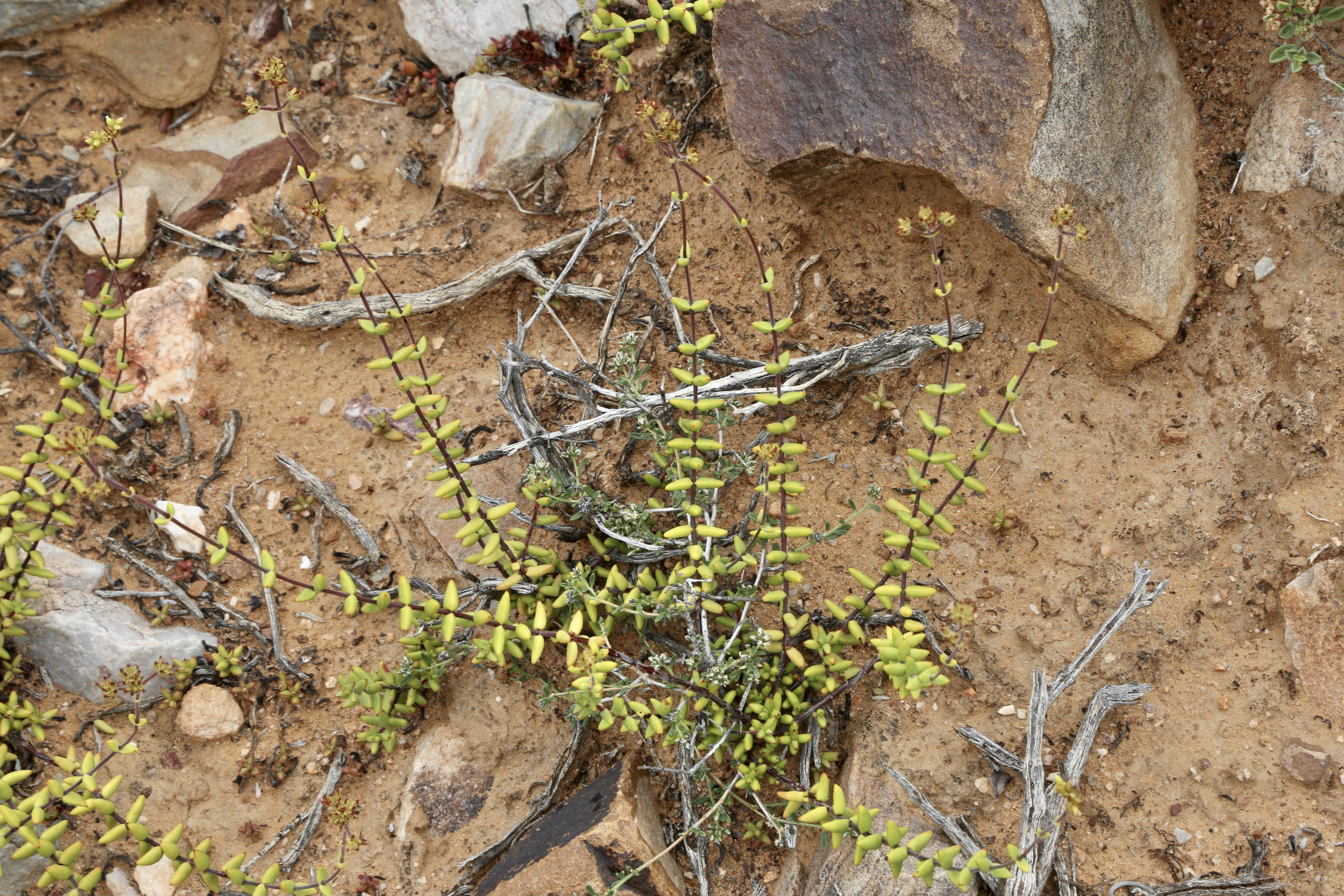
- Crassula subaphylla var. subaphylla in Anysberg Nature Reserve, South Africa.

Scientific classification
- Kingdom: Plantae
- Clade: Tracheophytes
- Clade: Angiosperms
- Clade: Eudicots
- Order: Saxifragales
- Family: Crassulaceae
- Genus: Crassula
- Species: C. subaphylla

Binomial name
- Crassula subaphylla (Eckl. & Zeyh.) Harv., 1862

Synonyms
- Sphaeritis subaphylla Eckl. & Zeyh., 1837; Globulea subaphylla (Eckl. & Zeyh.) P. V. Heath, 1995

= Crassula subaphylla =

Species of plant

Crassula subaphylla is a succulent plant belonging to the family Crassulaceae. It is widespread in the Karoo regions of South Africa and Namibia.

== Description ==
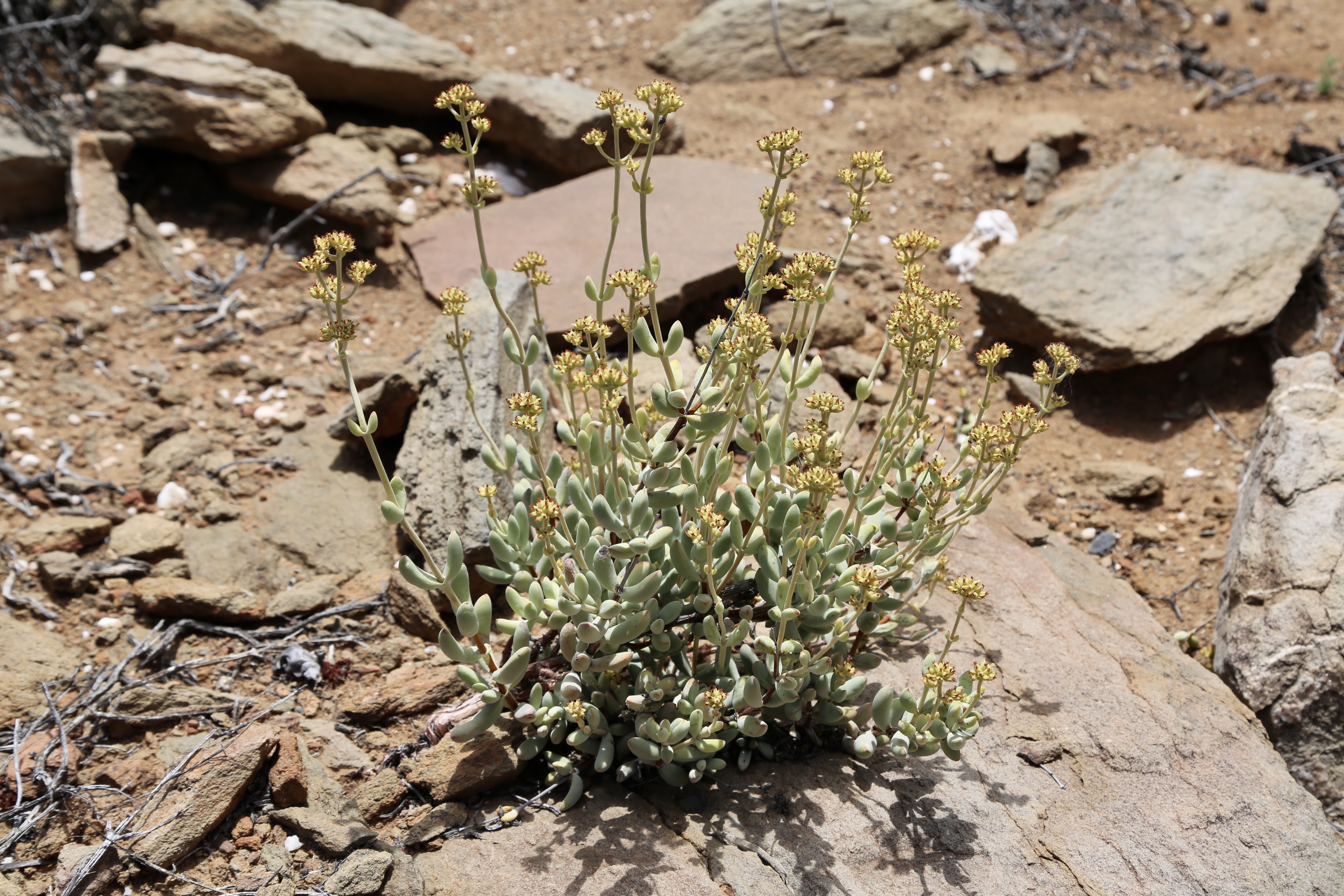
Young flowering plant in Anysberg Nature Reserve

A small, sparse, shrubby species.

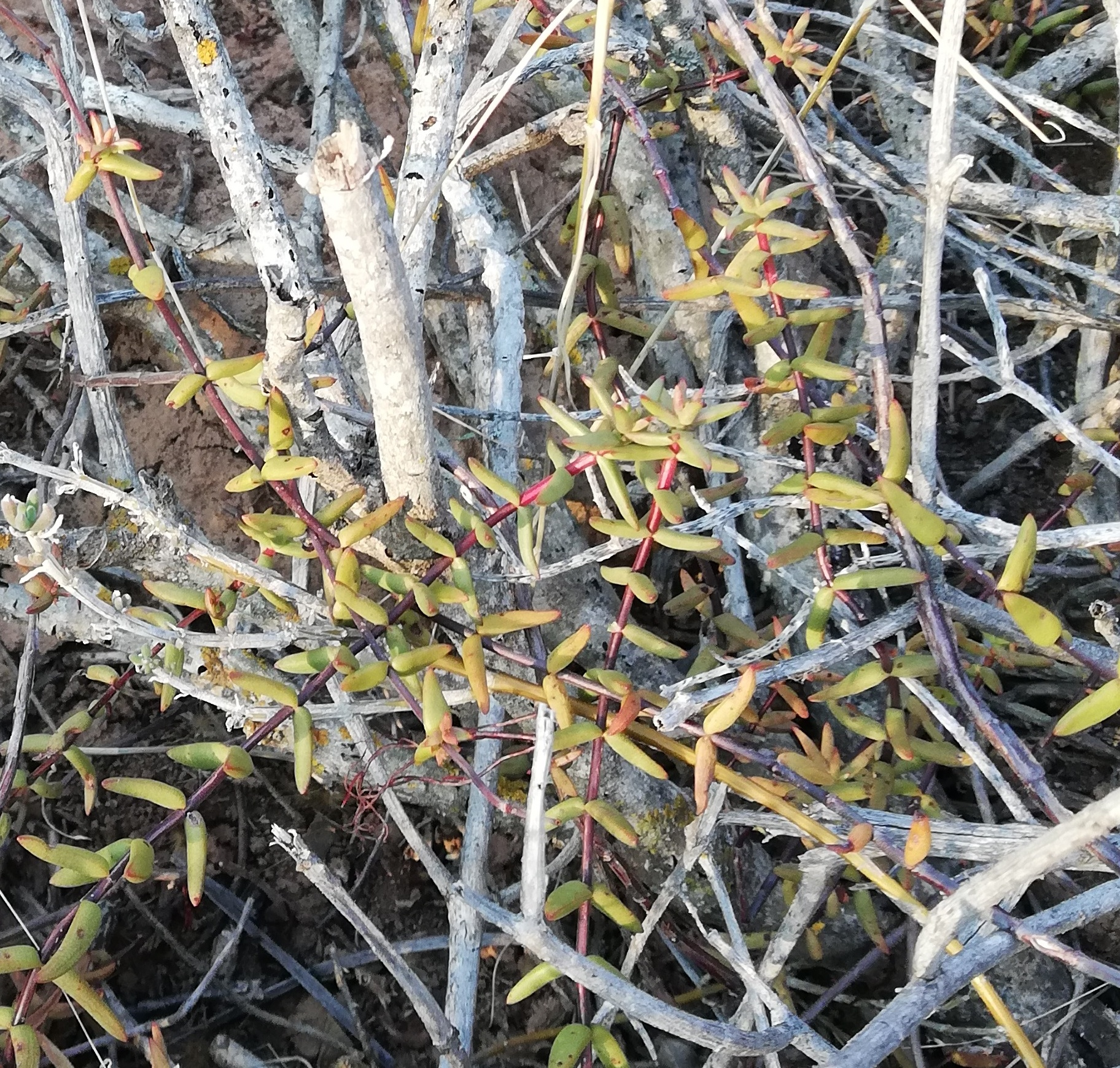
The twiggy, decumbent stems of Crassula subaphylla, growing in the Robertson Karoo.

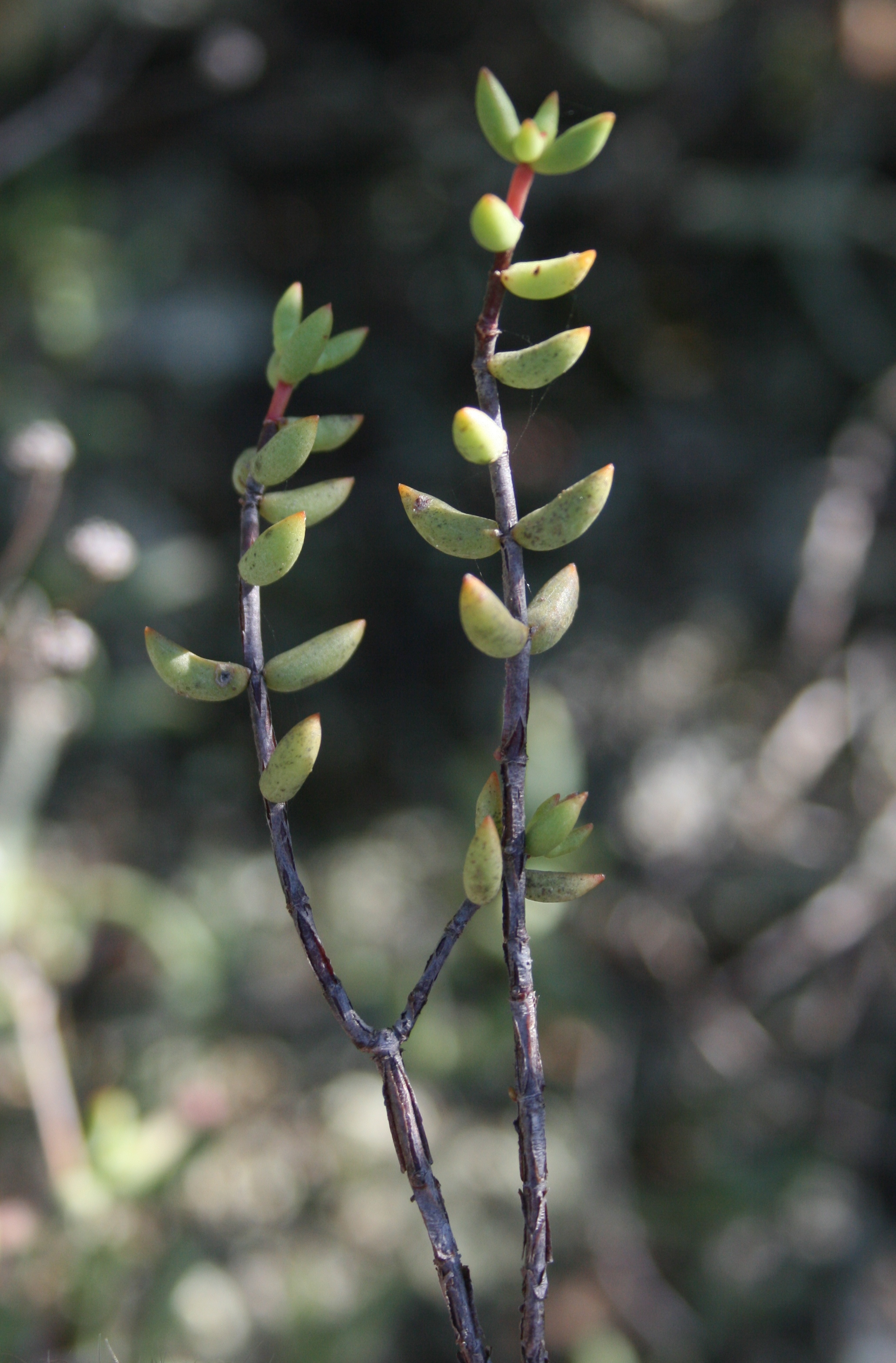
The brittle stems often have flaking strips of bark

Crassula subaphylla is a small, dense to sparse, straggly shrublet, consisting of numerous brownish stems and branches, 15 – 30 cm tall (up to 60 when scrambling in vegetation). Branches are wiry, woody, but thin and brittle, twiggy (usually decumbent), with flaking strips of bark. Younger branches are slightly velvety (puberulous), reddish-brown, carnose. The leaves are widely dispersed along the branches with internodes of 0.5 — 1 (-3) cm, variable in shape, hairiness and colour (greyish- or reddish-green to yellow-green), distinctively pointed/conical (lanceolate-linear), and easily break off, 5 – 23 mm long and 4 – 8 mm in diameter. It flowers in spring to mid-summer with thyrses up to 8 cm tall with numerous dichasia. The flowers are cream with brown anthers, tubular, panduriform, to 5 mm, have distinctively recurved membranous wings on both sides of the petal tips.

== Distribution and ecology ==
Succulent and Nama Karoo of South Namibia and RCA.

=== Regional variation ===
The typical form, with small lanceolate leaves, occurs in the Little Karoo, the Great Karoo as far as Namibia, and in surrounding karooid and mountainous areas, as well as the Overberg in the southern Cape. The rare variety virgata is only found in the far western Namaqualand, and has smooth leaves on erect branches. The form that occurs around Worcester, in the south-west, also decumbent, sometimes has thin, glabrous leaves and only the young stems are slightly hairy.

== Subspecies ==
- Crassula subaphylla var. subaphylla — southern Namibia southwards into the Northern, Western, and Eastern Cape; also in the Free State.
- Crassula subaphylla var. virgata (Harv.) Toelken — RCA (Northern Cape, Western Cape).

== Related species ==
The closest relatives of this species are Crassula mollis, Crassula atropurpurea, Crassula cultrata and Crassula pubescens. All of these species are caulescent perennials in the Crassula section Globulea, with woody branches, visible internodes, and leaves that do not persist long on the stems.

It can sometimes also be confused with the sympatric (but relatively unrelated) species Crassula tetragona or Crassula brevifolia.
