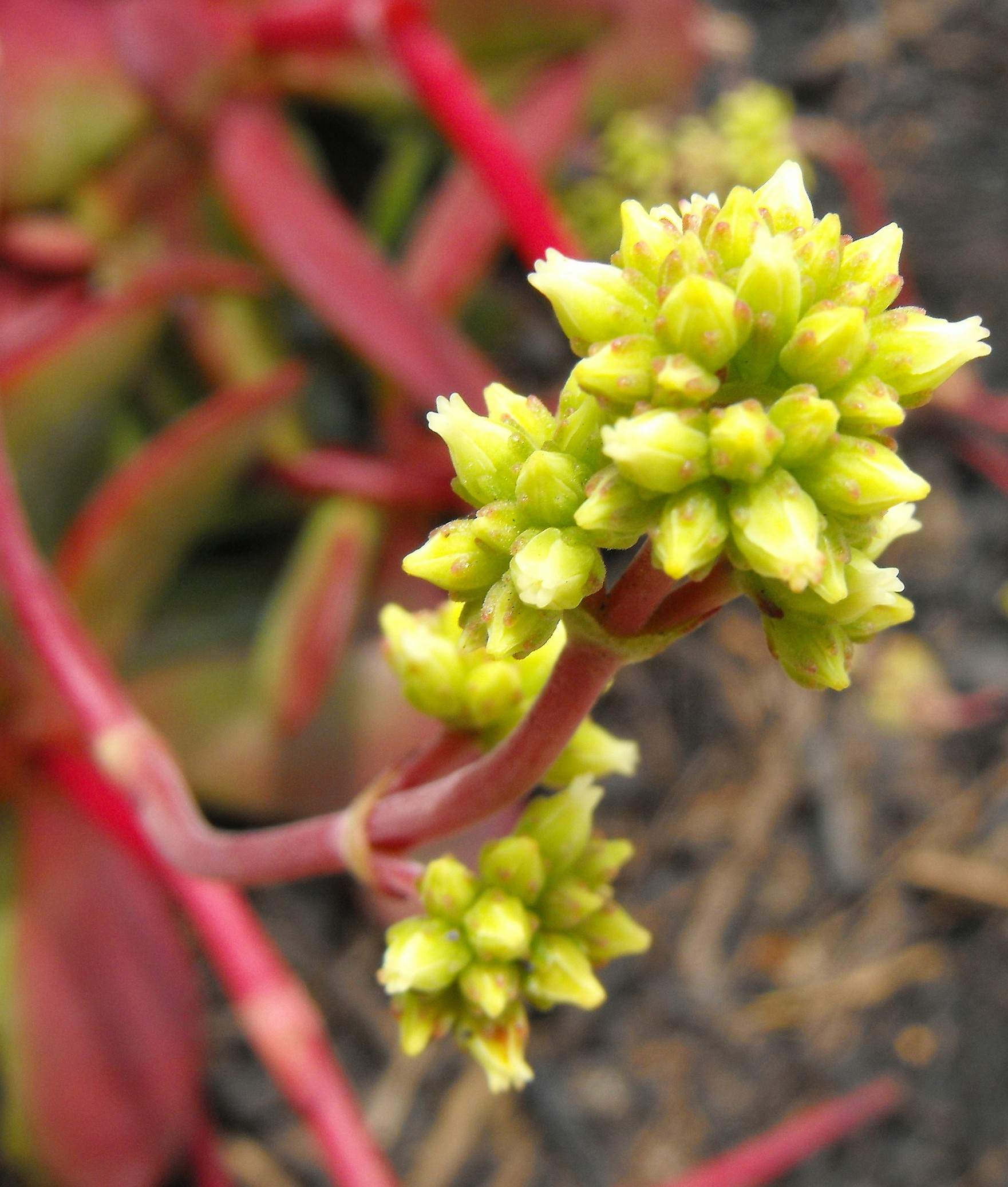
- The distinctive flowers of Crassula pubescens

Scientific classification
- Kingdom: Plantae
- Clade: Tracheophytes
- Clade: Angiosperms
- Clade: Eudicots
- Order: Saxifragales
- Family: Crassulaceae
- Genus: Crassula
- Species: C. pubescens

Binomial name
- Crassula pubescens Thunb.

= Crassula pubescens =

Species of plant

Crassula pubescens is a succulent plant, common and widespread in the southern Karoo regions of South Africa.

== Description ==
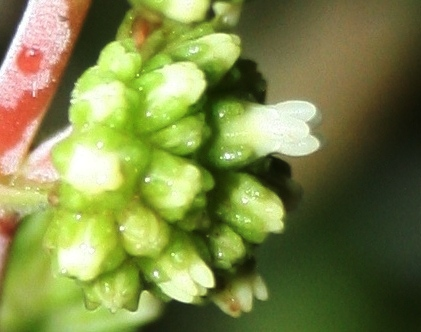
C.pubescens can be identified by the globular petal appendages of its flowers. Those of Crassula pubescens subsp. pubescens are oval

A small (up to 40 cm), shrubby perennial, with delicate, erect stems and pubescent (velvety) leaves that are 1-3 cm long.

The peduncle emerges above the leaves of the rosette. The peduncle is 3-15 cm long, with one or two bract-pairs (not 15-40 cm long with 2-5 bract pairs like those of Crassula subacaulis). The tips of its 2-3mm long petals are roughly twice as long as they are broad, and have rounded appendages (not beaked/rostrate like those of Crassula atropurpurea).

=== Subspecies ===
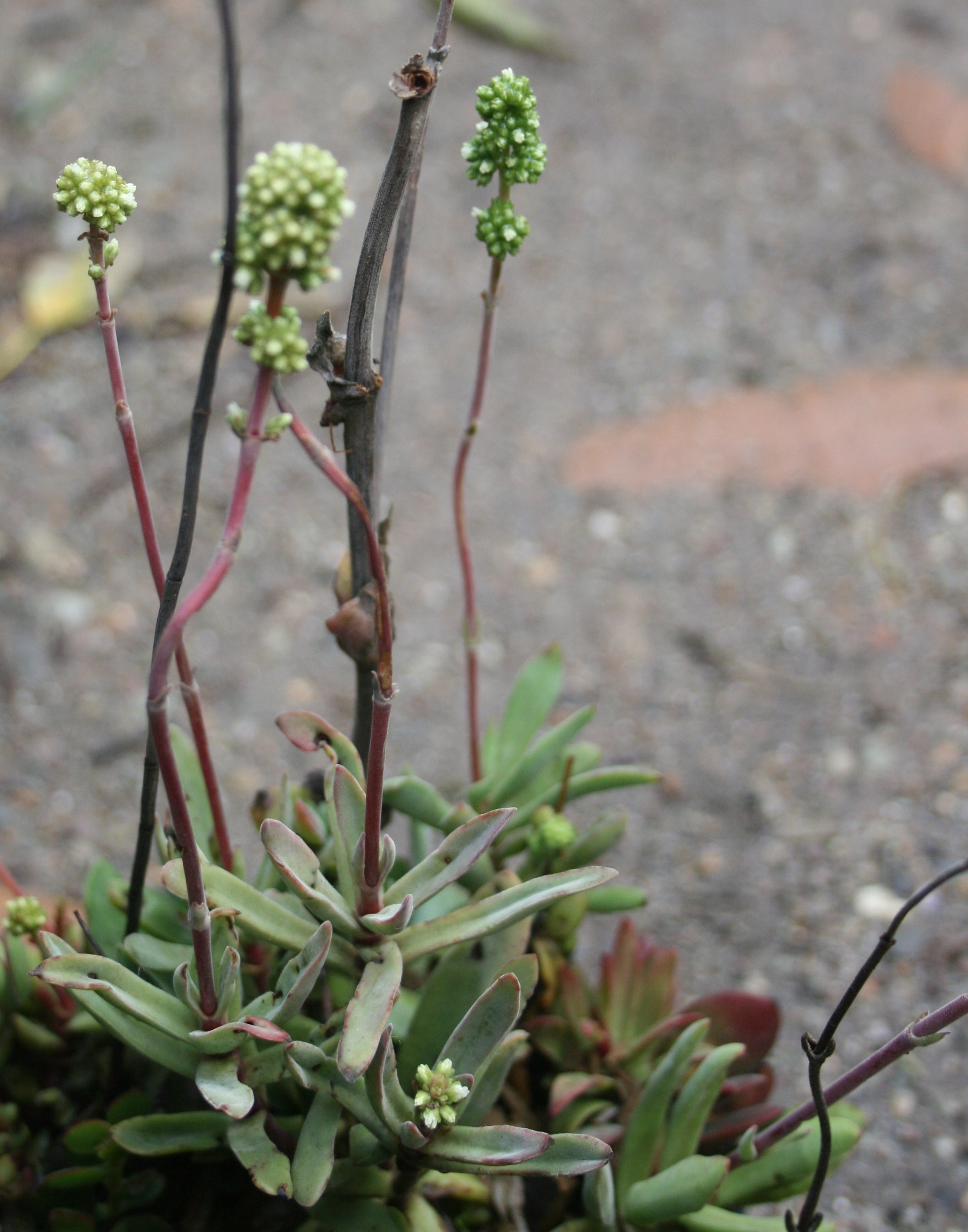
Crassula pubescens subsp. pubescens has erect branches, pubescent (velvety) leaves and petal appendages that are elongated-oval

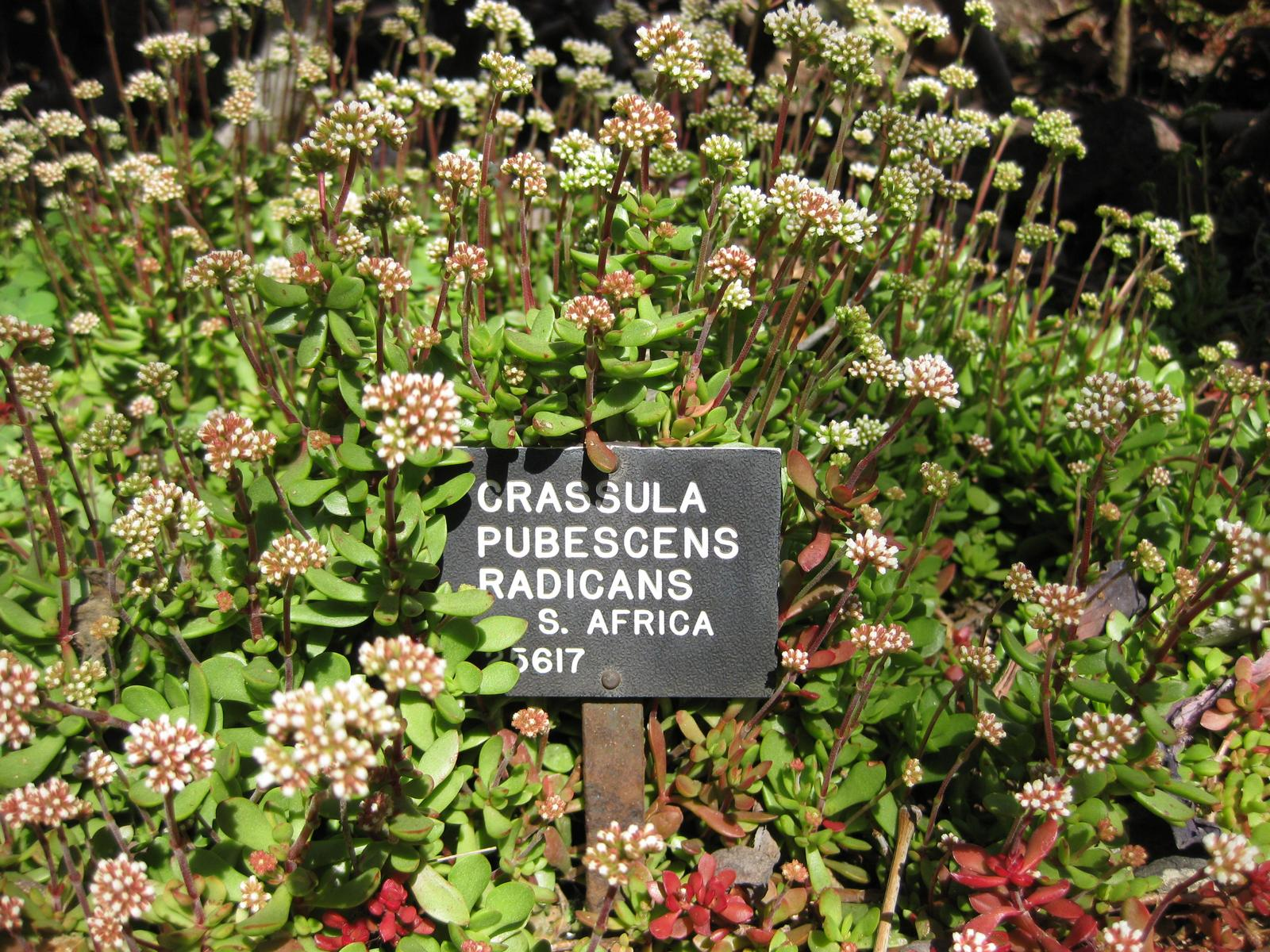
Crassula pubescens subsp. radicans has hairless leaves and petal appendages that are round

This species is variable, and several subspecies exist, which differ in their core features:

- sbsp. pubescens: The main subspecies has erect, non-rooting branches that are visible between the pubescent-to-papillate leaves. Its petal appendages are elongated ovally rounded.
- sbsp. radicans (Haw.) Tölk.: This eastern subspecies has smooth leaves and slender, decumbent, rooting branches.
- sbsp. rattrayi (Schönl. & Bak.f.) Tölk.: Inflorescence in an erect thyrse.

=== Related species ===
C. pubescens is closely related to the similar species Crassula subaphylla (which has longer petals - 3,5-4,5 mm), Crassula cultrata, Crassula cotyledonis, Crassula atropurpurea and Crassula nudicaulis.

C.pubescens is much smaller than Crassula cultrata (which has a distinguishing spike inflorescence and leaves that are usually longer than 3 cm).

== Distribution ==
It occurs from the Cedarberg area in the west, throughout the Little Karoo, into the Eastern Cape Province. It is recorded from the Worcester and De Doorns areas, from Napkys, Riversdale, Gouritz, Montagu, Laingsburg, Ladismith, Vanwyksdorp, Uniondale and Mossel Bay.
