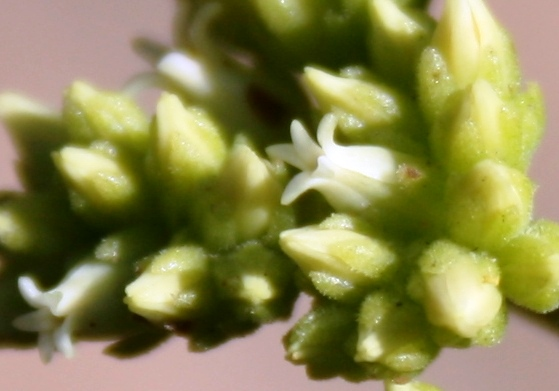
- The key defining character of Crassula atropurpurea is its distinctive flowers.

Scientific classification
- Kingdom: Plantae
- Clade: Tracheophytes
- Clade: Angiosperms
- Clade: Eudicots
- Order: Saxifragales
- Family: Crassulaceae
- Genus: Crassula
- Species: C. atropurpurea

Binomial name
- Crassula atropurpurea (Haw.) D.Dietr.

= Crassula atropurpurea =

Purple Crassula

Species of succulent

Crassula atropurpurea (Purple Crassula) is a succulent plant, very common and widespread in the southern Karoo regions of South Africa and Namibia.

== Description ==
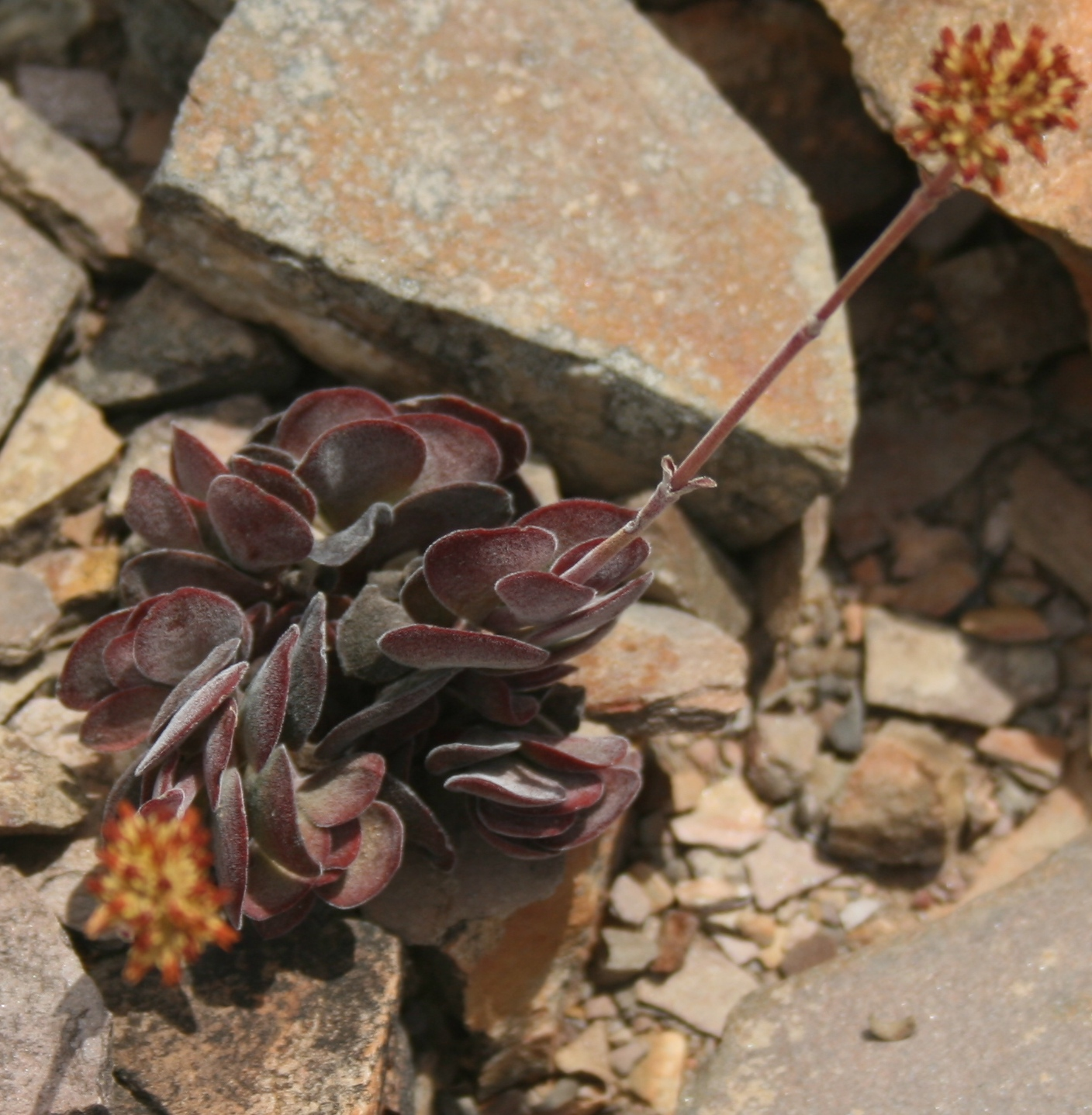
Crassula atropurpurea in habitat

This species is extremely variable. It is typically a small (up to 60 cm), shrubby perennial, with erect, branching stems.

Its leaves are erect, or only slightly twisted across the stem. The leaves are sessile and packed evenly along the stems. Each leaf is typically linear-obovate (though this varies greatly), and has a slightly waxy surface. During drought or sun exposure, the leaves can develop a purple colour.

Its slender spike-like inflorescence bears pale yellow-white flowers.

The key distinguishing character of this species is its roughly canaliculate dorsal petal appendage.

== Varieties ==
=== var. atropurpurea ===
The type variety is the most widespread and variable in appearance. Key features for identifying it include:

- The leaf surface is smooth or papillate, but never hairy.
- There are 3-4 (rarely 2 or 5) pairs of sterile bracts along the stem of the inflorescence.
- The pointed, canaliculate (grooved) petals are papillose.

In addition, the stems of this variety are usually erect branches (woody at base, new shoots pubescent). The new leaves are erect, becoming spreading and eventually falling off with age. The leaf shape is typically oblong to oblanceolate (max. 6cm long), flattened with a convex outer/lower surface. They are cuneate at the base, and obtuse at the apex. Around the Langeberg and Swartberg mountains, as far west as Worcester, some forms can have slender, pointed leaves.

This variety occurs from Worcester and Swellendam in the west, as far east as Port Elizabeth, as well as around the Swartberg mountains. Its habitat is usually dry, rocky slopes and outcrops.

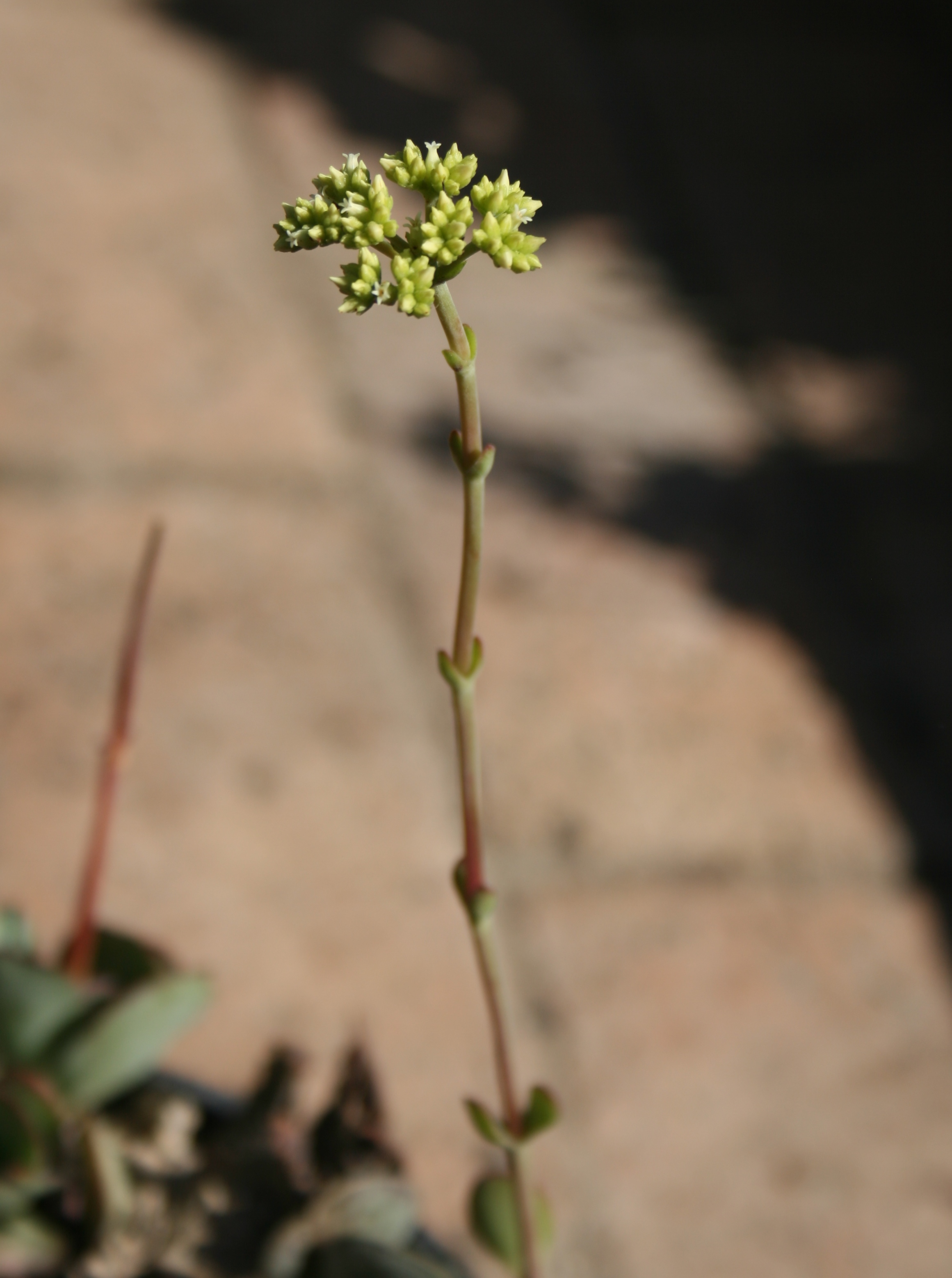
C. atropurpurea var. atropurpurea inflorescence, showing the many pairs of sterile bracts

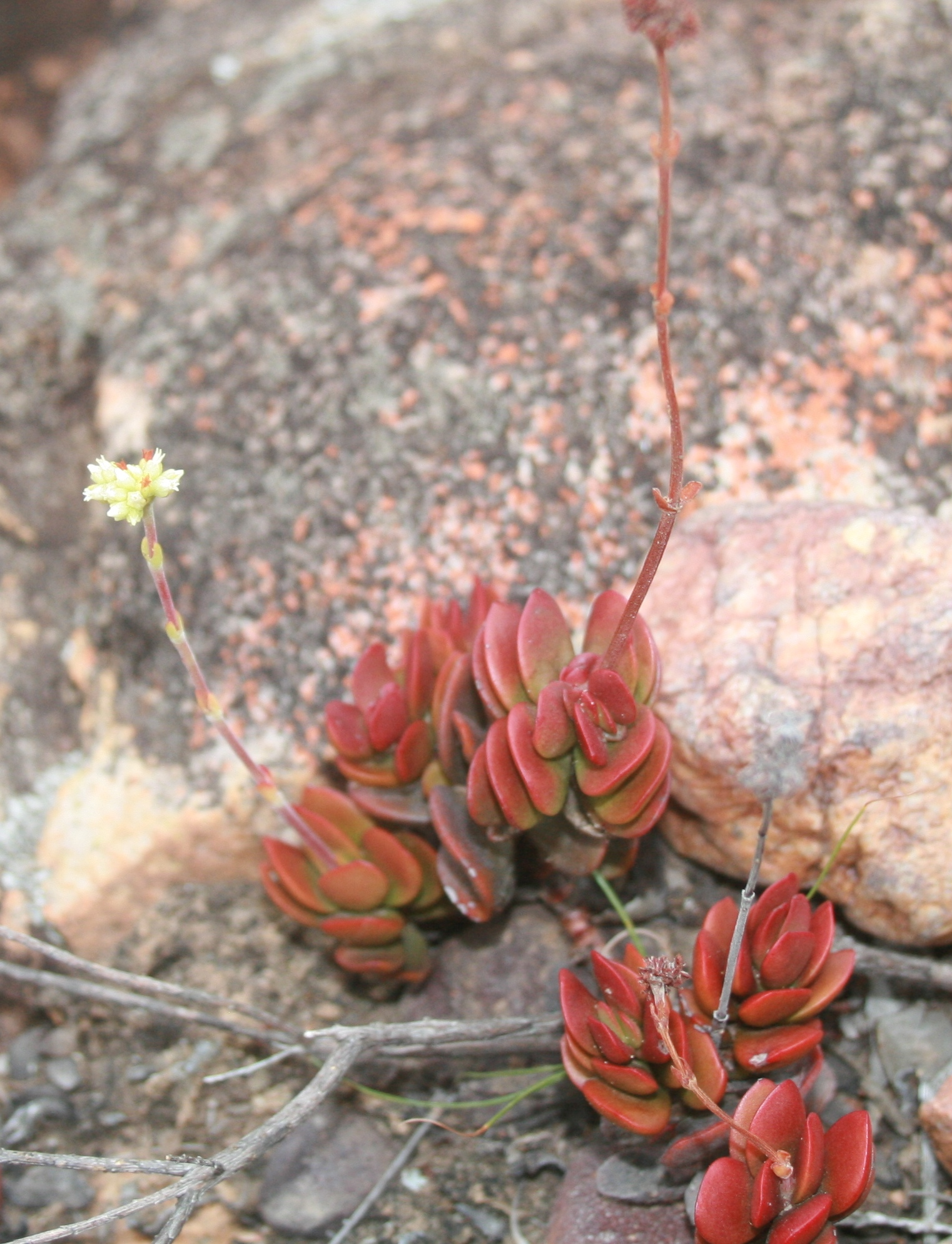
C. atropurpurea var. atropurpurea showing smooth leaves, and 3-4 bract-pairs along the flower stems.

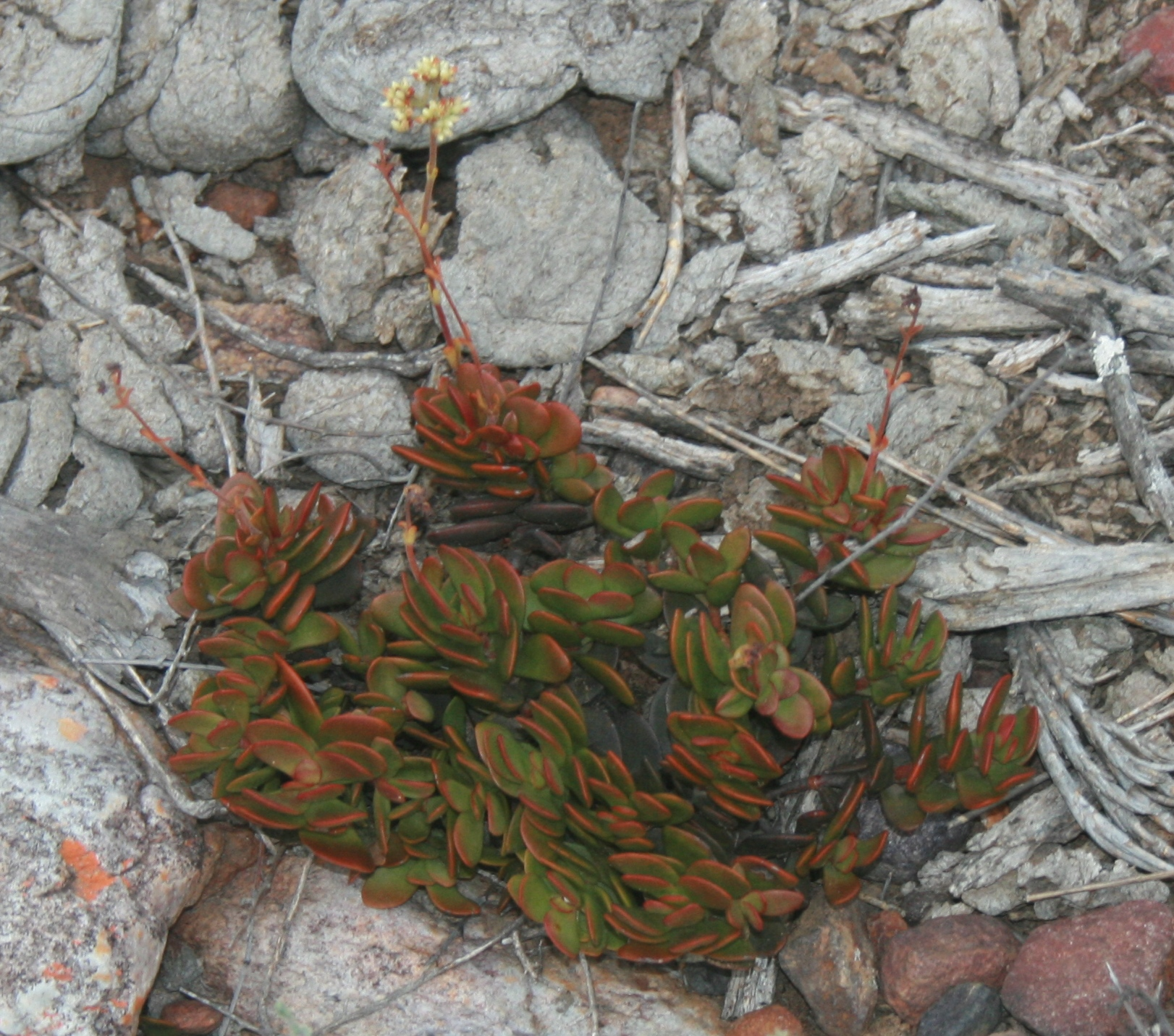
C. atropurpurea var. atropurpurea

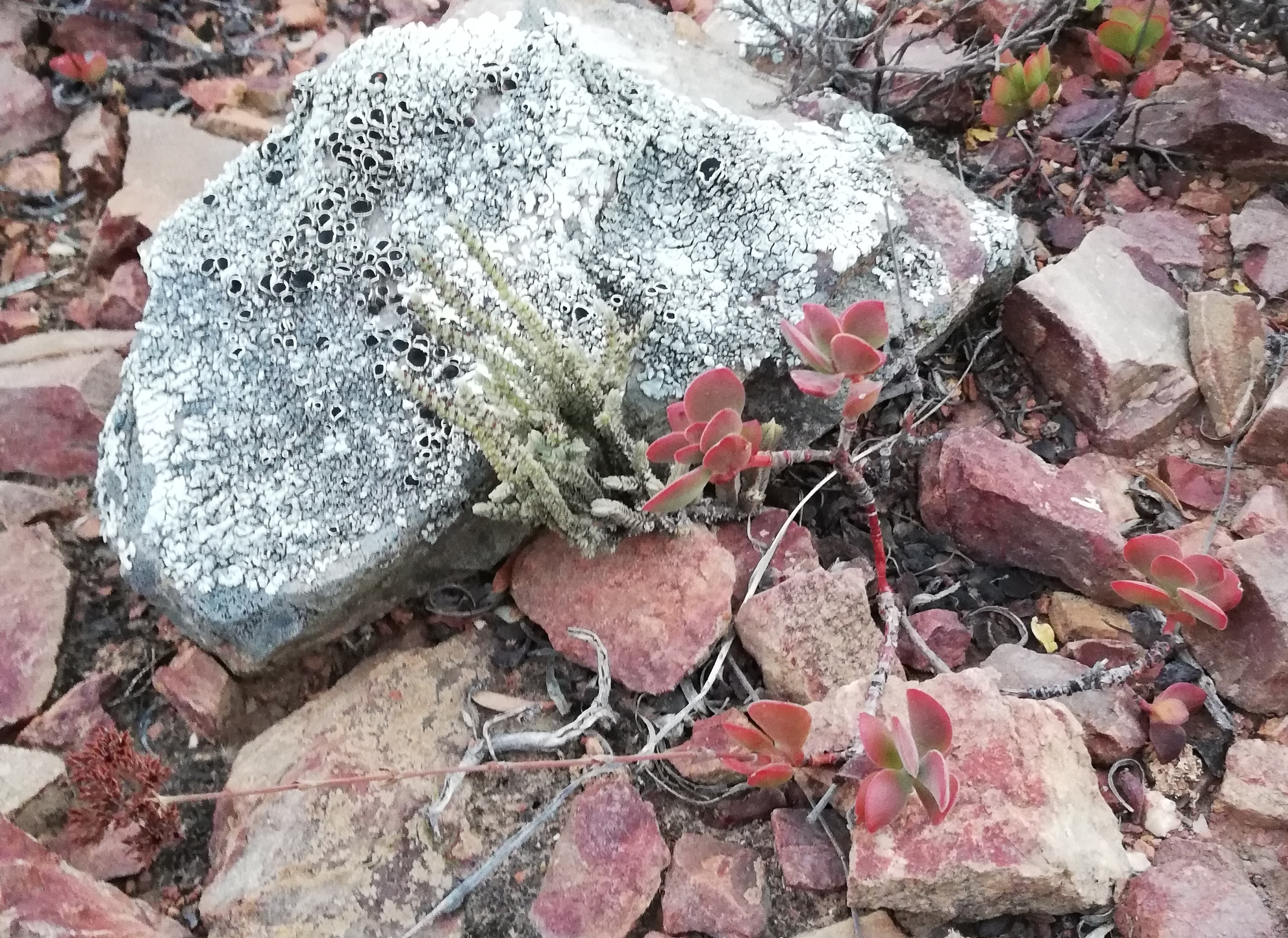
C. atropurpurea var. atropurpurea showing its more or less erect branches.

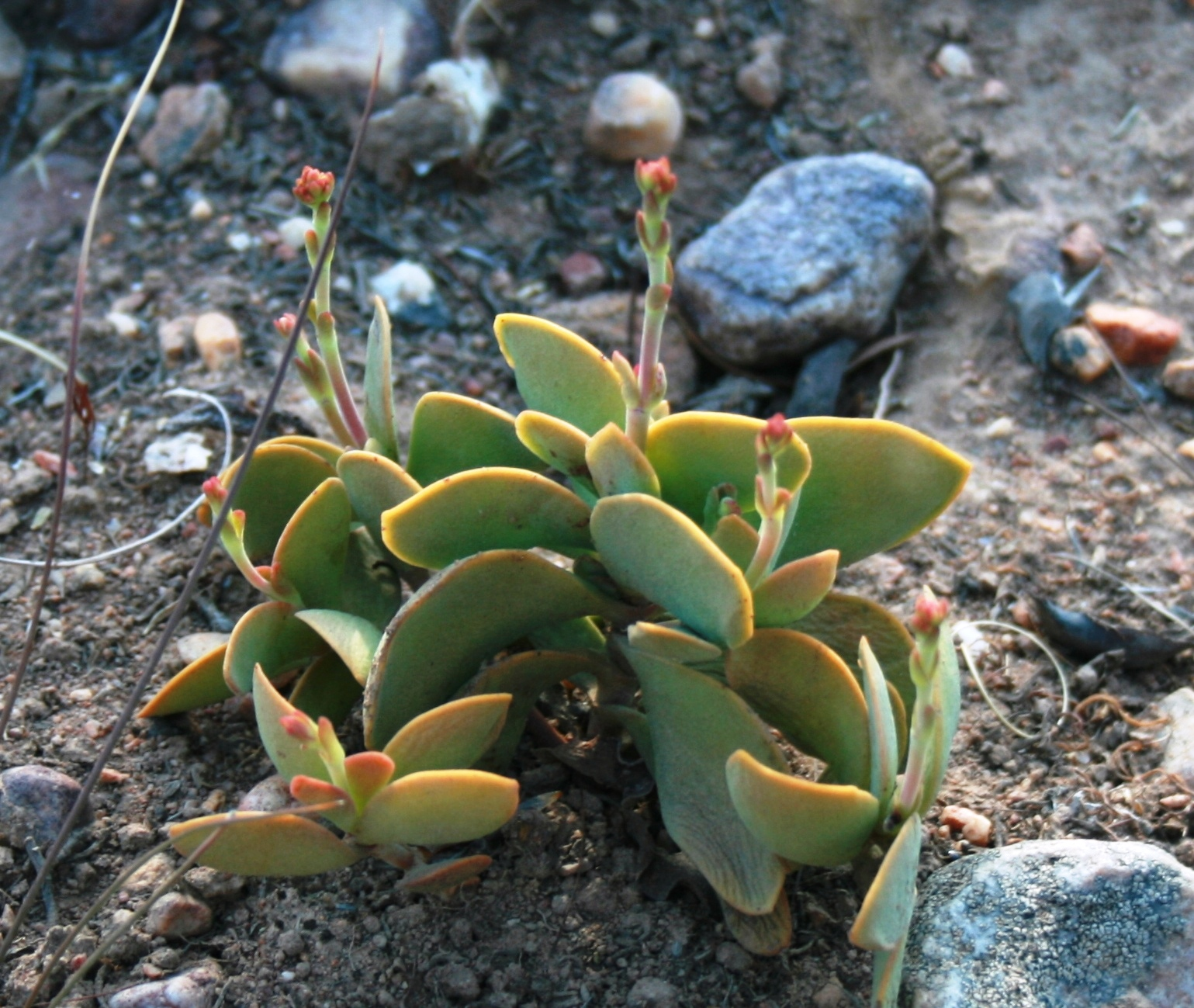
C. atropurpurea var. atropurpurea

=== var. anomala (Schonl. & Bak. f.) Toelken. ===
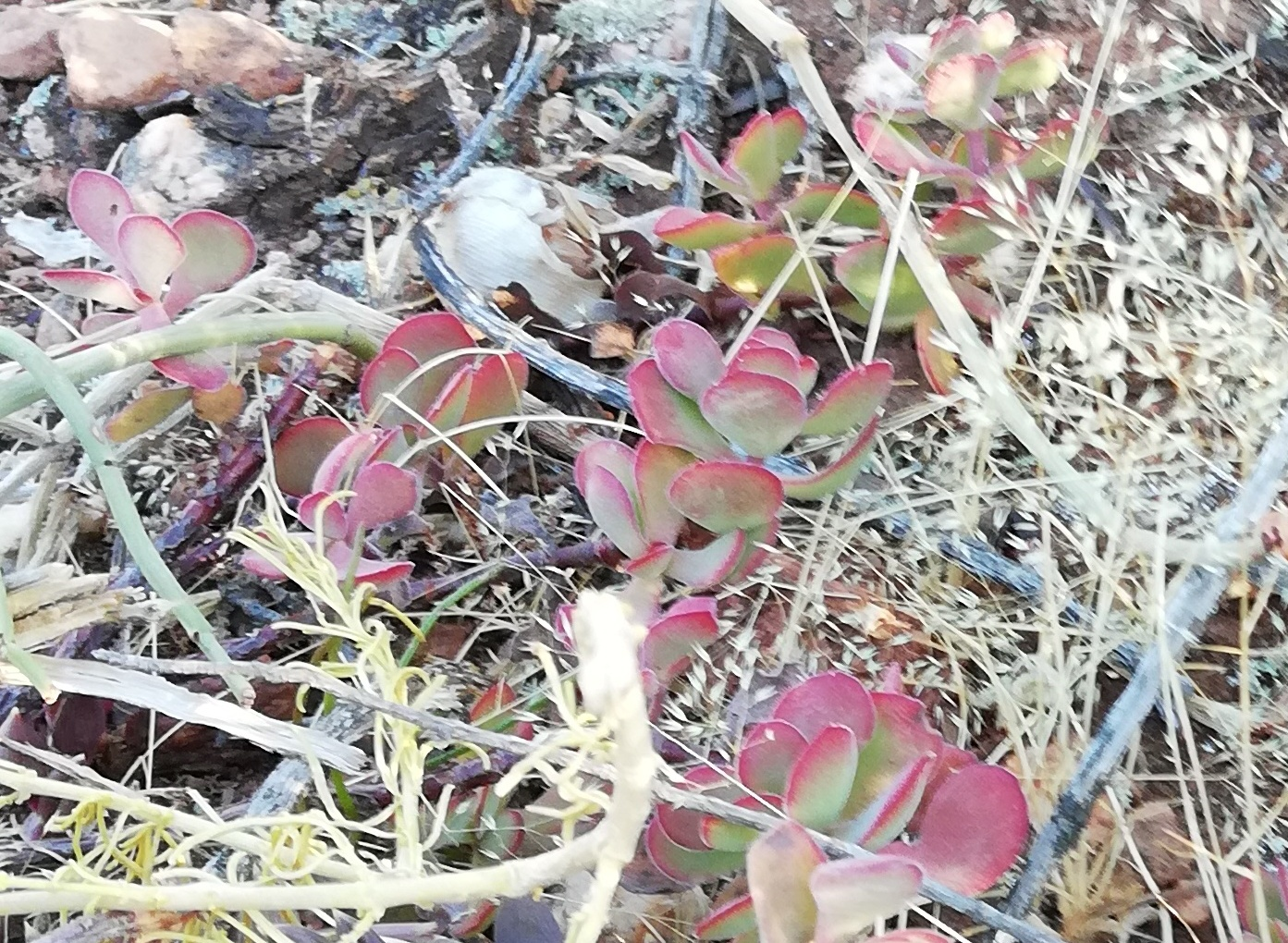
C. atropurpurea var anomala has reddish margins around its pubescent leaves. It has thick, succulent, decumbent stems and erect hairs.

A distinctive south-western variety. Key diagnostic features include:

- The leaves and stem are covered in erect hairs.
- There are 1 (rarely two) pairs of sterile bracts along the stem of the inflorescence.
- The petals have very prominent dorsal appendages (canaliculate on the inside).
- The stems are a few decumbent-to-erect branches, fleshy and relatively thick (4-8 mm).

In addition, the leaves are green to yellow-green (becoming reddish in drought or direct sun). The leaf shape is nearly always obovate to orbicular, with obtuse apices.

This variety occurs from Table Mountain in the west, to Montagu in the east, and north into the Bokkeveld mountains. It is very common in the Robertson Karoo. Its habitat is usually more sheltered rocky ledges, on south-facing slopes. It cooccurs with var. muirii ("rubella"), but anomala has much thicker stems, as well as leaves and stems with erect hairs.

=== var. muirii (Schönland) R.Fern. (formerly rubella (Compton) Toelken) ===
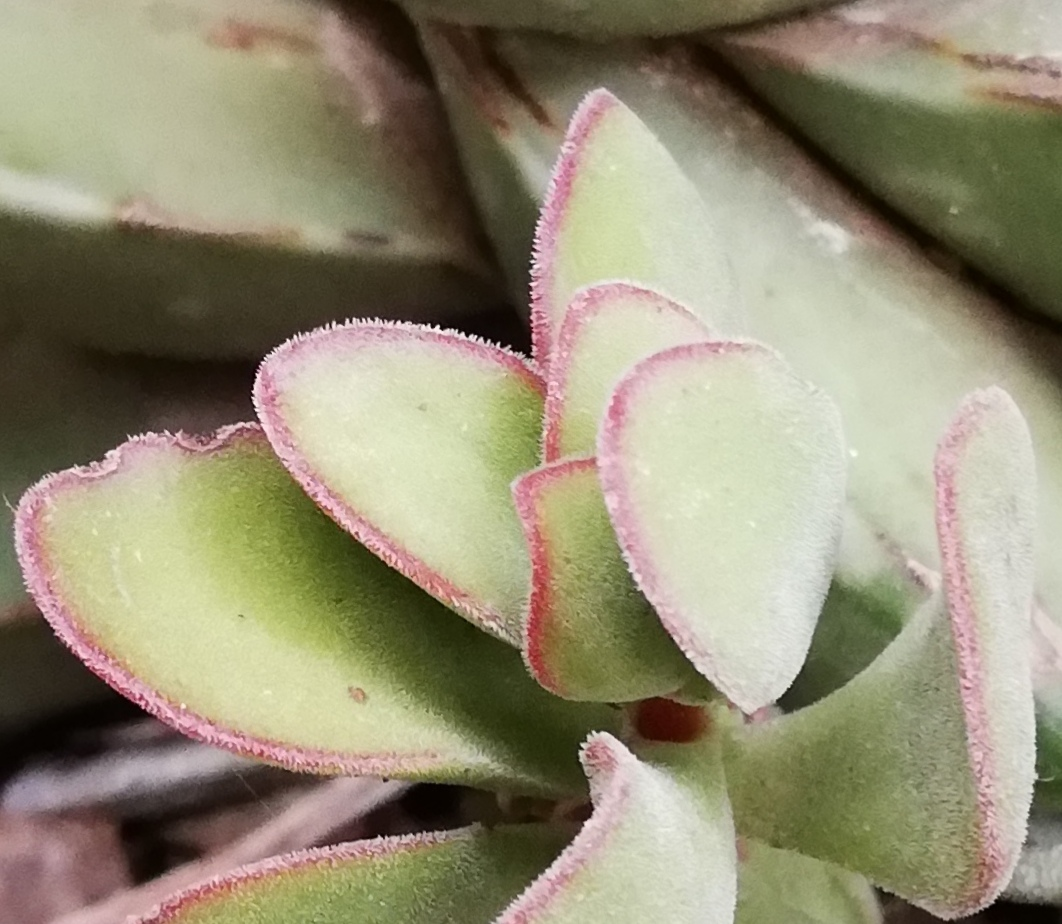
C. atropurpurea var. muirii (formerly "rubella") is similar to var. anomala, but has thinner, more erect stems, and blunt, adpressed hairs.

Another south-western variety. Key diagnostic features include:

- The leaves and stem are covered in blunt/ad-pressed/recurved hairs (pubescent).
- There are 1-2 (rarely 3) pairs of sterile bracts along the stem of the inflorescence.

In addition, the stems are erect branches, wiry and slender (2-4 mm). Leaves are grey-green to reddish-brown. In habitat they are distinctively reddish around the leaf-margin, where the hairs are slightly longer (though not in a single row). The leaf shape is obovate, with obtuse apices.

This Karoo variety occurs from Worcester, eastwards to Prince Albert and northwards to the Cedarberg. Its habitat is usually exposed shallow soil on dry, sunny rocky hilltops.

=== var. cultriformis (Friedr.) Toelken. ===
From quartzite gravel slopes and dunes in the far north, near Garies.

=== var. purcellii (Schonl.) Toelken. ===
From Karoo slopes of sandstone/quartzite rocks, from the Anysberg and north of the Witteberge mountains, as far west as the Cedarberg mountains.

=== var. watermeyeri (Compton) Toelken. ===
From arid sheltered rocky crevices across the Namaqualand.

== Relatives ==
C. atropurpurea is closely related to Crassula subaphylla, Crassula cultrata, Crassula cotyledonis, Crassula pubescens and Crassula nudicaulis. Crassula subaphylla is distinguished by its scrambling habit, and its narrower leaves with swollen bases.

== Distribution ==
C. atropurpurea is very common and widely distributed in rocky areas across the western half of southern Africa.

It occurs from southern Namibia in the north, through the Namaqualand and the western Karoo regions of the Western Cape Province, South Africa. It is common in the Little Karoo, between rocks and under bushes, from Worcester in the west, to as far east as Oudtshoorn.
