= C. tetragona =

C. tetragona may refer to:

- Cassiope tetragona, the Arctic bell-heather, a plant species
- Clidemia tetragona, a species in the genus Clidemia
- Crassula tetragona, a succulent plant species native to Southern Africa

== See also ==
- Tetragona
