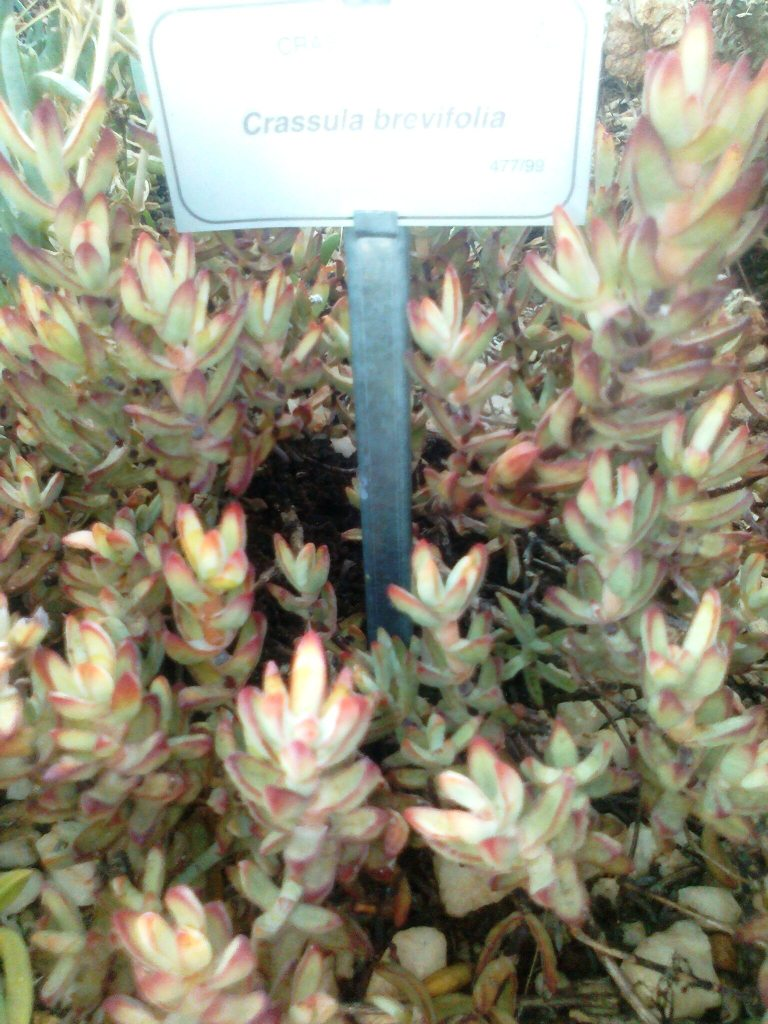
- The thickly-succulent leaves of Crassula brevifolia

Scientific classification
- Kingdom: Plantae
- Clade: Tracheophytes
- Clade: Angiosperms
- Clade: Eudicots
- Order: Saxifragales
- Family: Crassulaceae
- Genus: Crassula
- Species: C. brevifolia

Binomial name
- Crassula brevifolia Harv.

= Crassula brevifolia =

Species of succulent plant

Crassula brevifolia is a succulent plant in the family Crassulaceae. It is native to the arid western edge of South Africa (including the Namaqualand, as far south as Vanrhynsdorp) as well as southern Namibia.

== Description ==
A small (reaching 50cm in height), branching, perennial shrub.

It has distinctively short, thickly-succulent leaves, which are roughly triangular in cross-section but with slightly rounded angles (leaf-margins). It has flaking brown bark on its thin, woody stems.

=== Variation ===
This is a very variable species, with two subspecies and many regional forms.

- subsp. brevifolia. The type subsp. grows on exposed quartzitic or granite outcrops, from Namibia to as far south as Vanrhynsdorp. It has papillate ovaries (each with 18-24 ovules), and the leaves usually point upwards, between visible internodes.
- subsp. psammophila. A rarer subspecies that favours flatter sands or gravels near the Orange River in the Northern Cape Province.

=== Related species ===
This species is closely related to Crassula rupestris and Crassula perforata.
