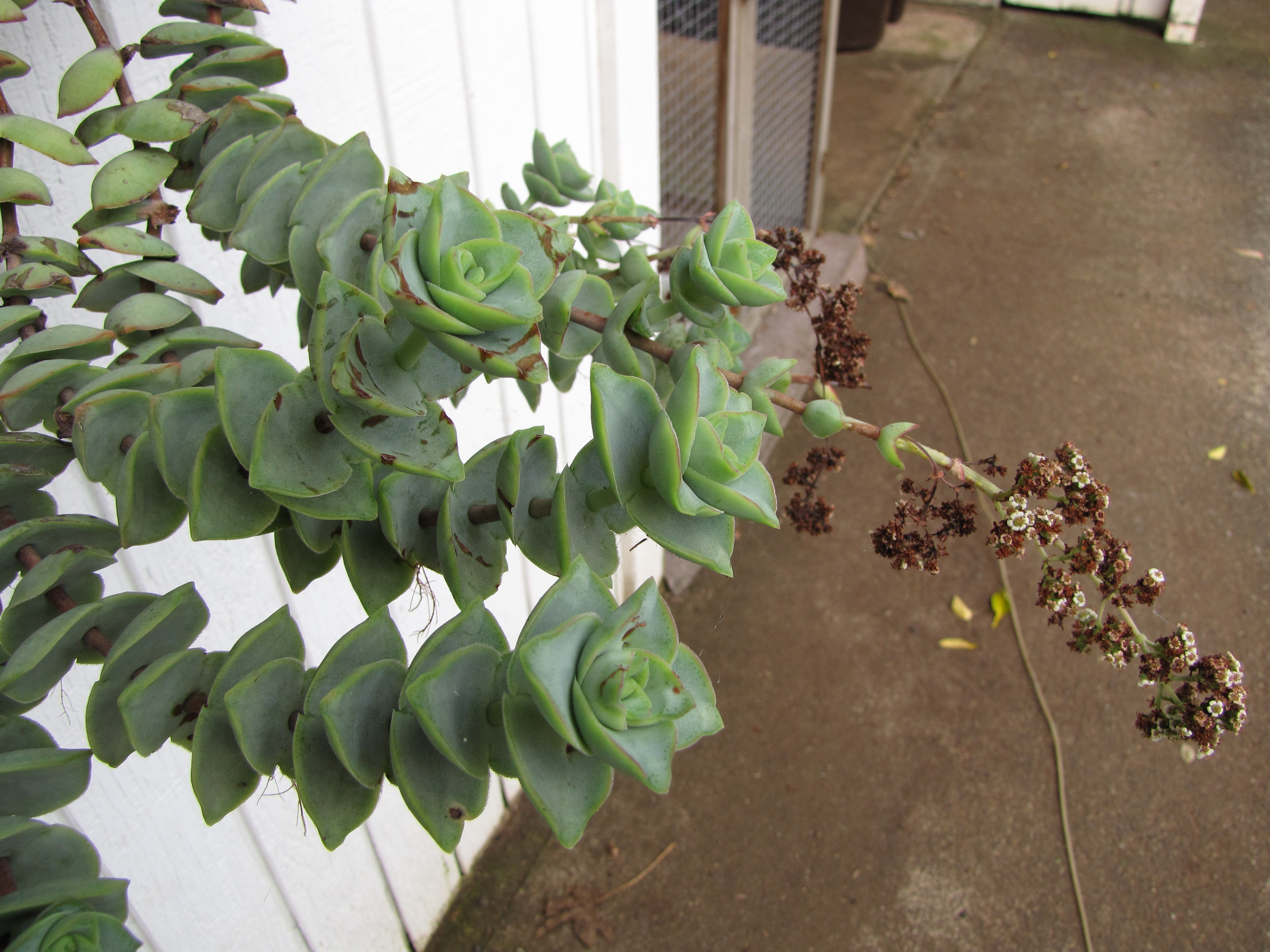
- Crassula perforata, with its characteristically elongated inflorescence.

Scientific classification
- Kingdom: Plantae
- Clade: Tracheophytes
- Clade: Angiosperms
- Clade: Eudicots
- Order: Saxifragales
- Family: Crassulaceae
- Genus: Crassula
- Species: C. perforata

Binomial name
- Crassula perforata Thunb. (1778)

= Crassula perforata =

Species of succulent

Crassula perforata is a succulent plant native to the Cape Provinces and KwaZulu-Natal in South Africa.

== Description ==
C. perforata grows long, unbranched, rambling stems. It looks similar to its close relative, Crassula rupestris, but C. perforata has a long inflorescence, with many tiny cream flowers, and it flowers between November and April. (Crassula rupestris has a dense and rounded inflorescence that has leaf-like bracts at its base, and it flowers between June and October).

== Distribution ==
C. perforata occurs in thicket vegetation and rocky slopes, from near Worcester in the west, to as far east as central KwaZulu-Natal.
