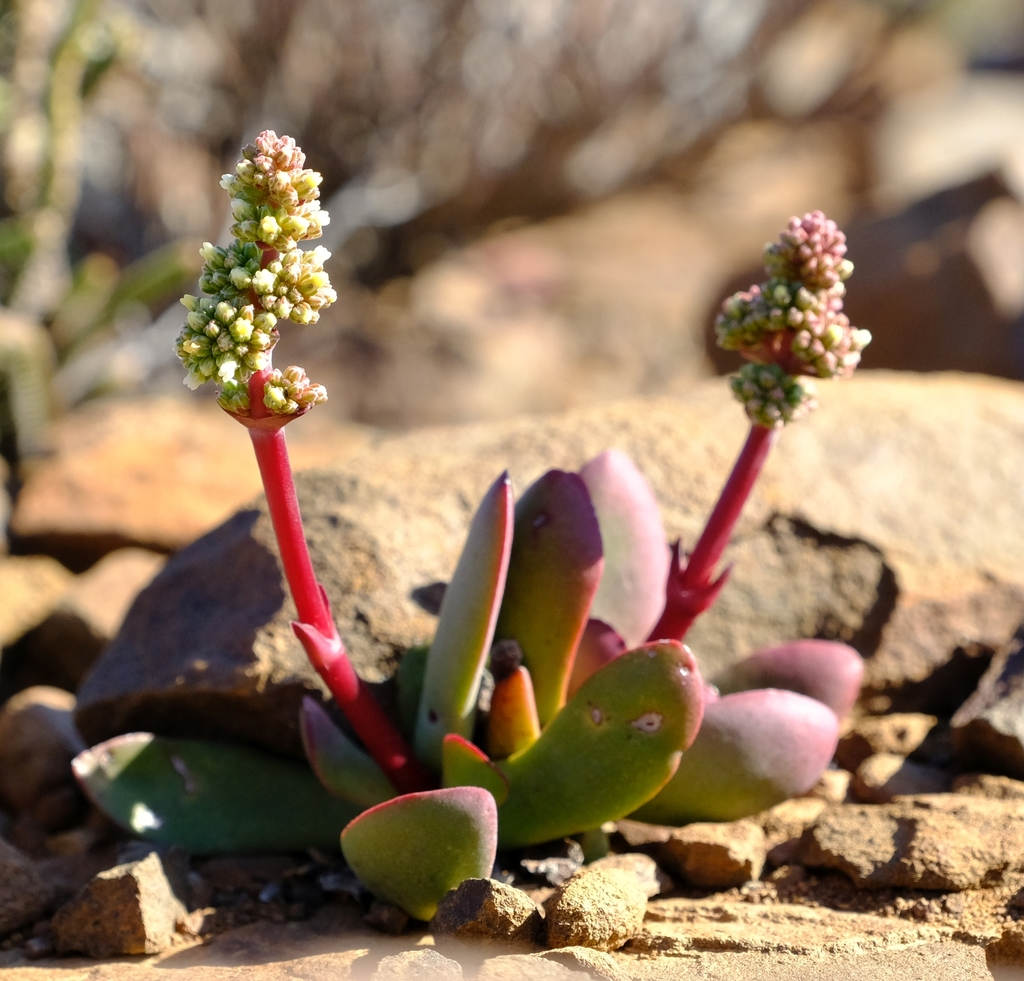

Scientific classification
- Kingdom: Plantae
- Clade: Tracheophytes
- Clade: Angiosperms
- Clade: Eudicots
- Order: Saxifragales
- Family: Crassulaceae
- Genus: Crassula
- Species: C. clavata

Binomial name
- Crassula clavata N.E.Br.

= Crassula clavata =

Species of succulent

Crassula clavata, is a species of succulent plant in the genus Crassula endemic to the Cape Provinces of South Africa.

== Description ==
Crassula clavata grows up to 10 inches tall. It has tightly packed oblanceolate leaves, able to grow to 1 inch. They are a dark reddish-purple. The flowers can reach 6 inches and are colored white.

== Cultivation ==
The plant survives in USDA hardiness zone 9b to 11b. Like many other species in the genus, Crassula clavata is easily suspectable to bug and fungal diseases. Propagation can be done through offsets or leaf cuttings. It needs full sun to partial shade.
