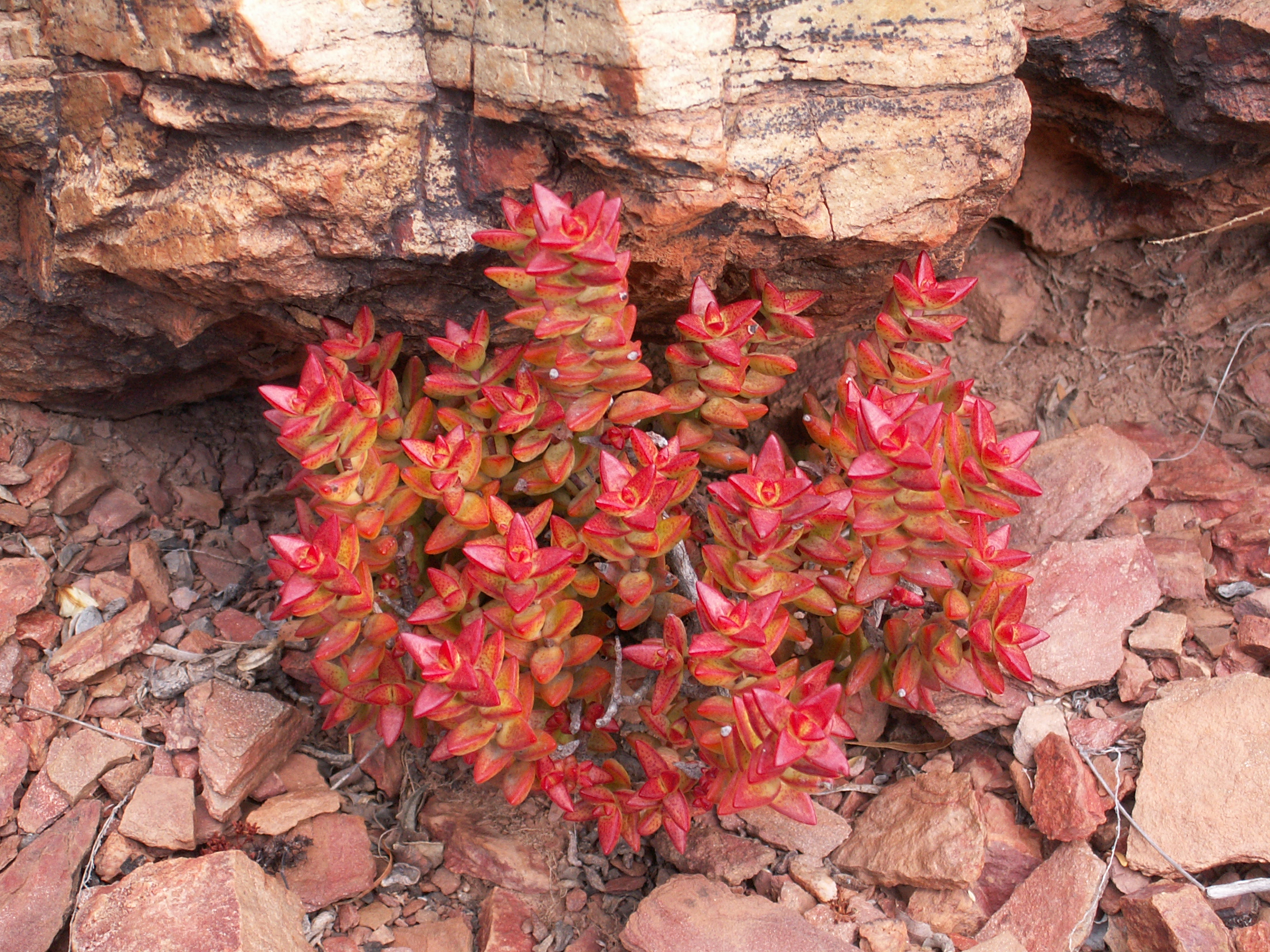
- Decussate phyllotaxis of Crassula rupestris

Scientific classification
- Kingdom: Plantae
- Clade: Embryophytes
- Clade: Tracheophytes
- Clade: Angiosperms
- Clade: Eudicots
- Order: Saxifragales
- Family: Crassulaceae
- Genus: Crassula
- Species: C. rupestris

Binomial name
- Crassula rupestris L.f.

Synonyms
- Crassula monticola N.E.Br.; Purgosea rupestris (L.f.) G.Don

= Crassula rupestris =

Species of plant

Crassula rupestris, called buttons on a string, is a species of Crassula native to Namibia and to the Cape Provinces of South Africa. It has gained the Royal Horticultural Society's Award of Garden Merit. It is also called bead vine, necklace vine, and rosary vine.

== Description ==
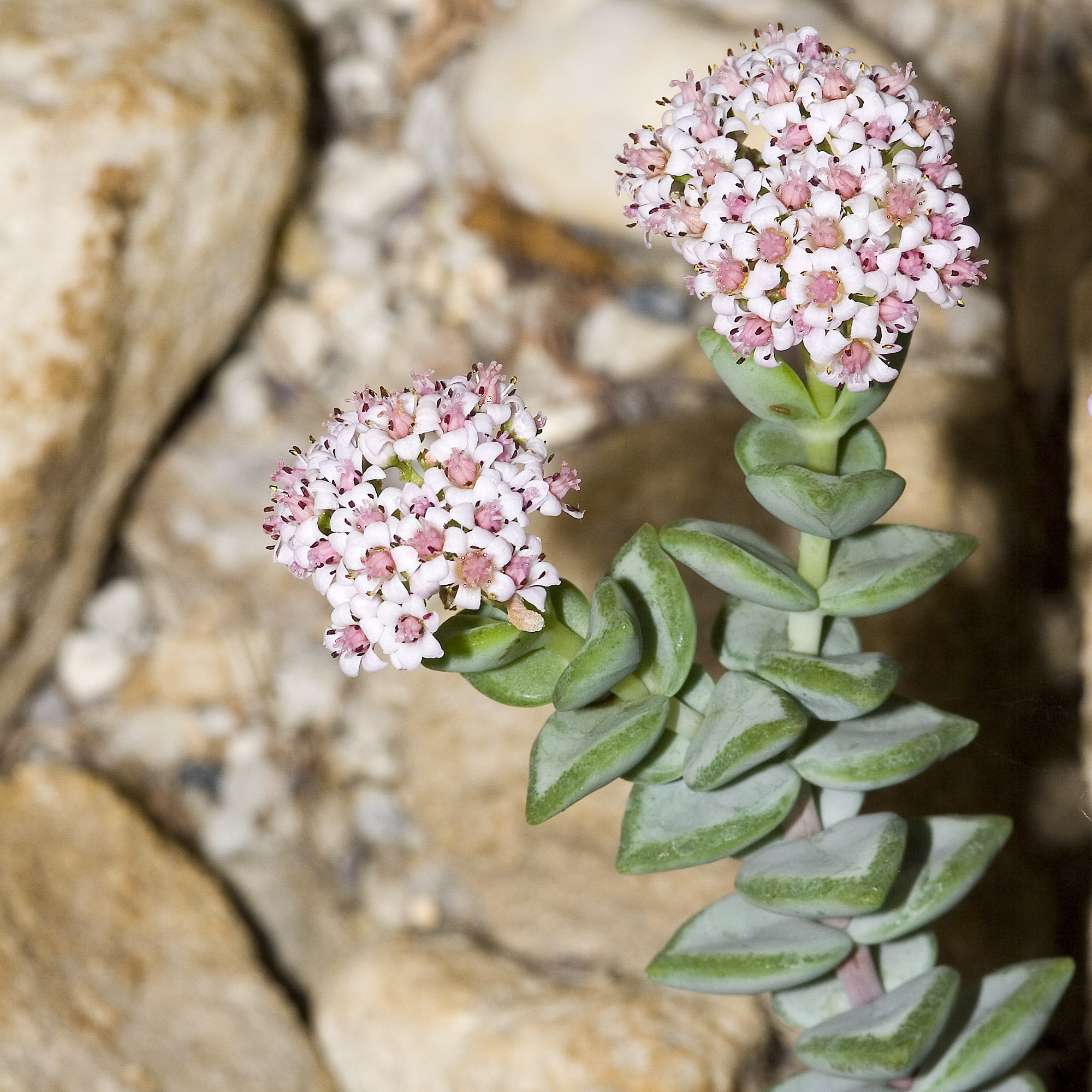
Flowers

It grows as a rounded, heavily branched succulent shrub and reaches heights of up to 600 millimeters (24 in). The roots are fibrous. The initially green, 2 millimeter thick shoots turn gray-brown with age, and measure 5 millimeters in diameter and then have peeling bark.

The flattened leaves are 13 to 18 millimeters long and 10 to 15 millimeters wide. Their upper side is flat to convex, but concave towards the base. The underside of the leaf is convex. The broadly egg-shaped, bare, gray-green leaf blade is powdery. It is contracted at its base and fused to the opposite leaf. The leaves are entire and reddish at the edge. The leaf tip is pointed or blunt. If exposed to intense sunlight, the plant will instead take on a reddish color.

Crassula 'Springtime' is a cultivar of the plant with peculiarly chunky leaves and showy blooms, with rugged, triangular leaves which stack up on thin stems up to 6 inches (150 mm) tall.

=== Inflorescence ===
The inflorescence is a rounded thyrsus with numerous dichasia. The inflorescence stalk is up to 2 centimeters (0.8 in) long. It has spreading bracts up to 3 millimeters long. The hermaphrodite flower is radially symmetrical and has five petals with a double perianth. The elongated triangular sepals are up to 1 millimeter long. The five petals are fused at their base to form a tube up to 4 millimeters long. The corolla is pink, and the stamens are brown.

== Cultivation ==
It prefers well-drained soils, with a good amount of sand, and can be planted in full sun all year round, though it prefers shade during the hottest hours of summer. Watering in summer should be frequent, while in winter it should be almost completely suspended.

The plant is included in USDA Hardiness Zones 9b to 12, therefore it should not be exposed to temperatures below 55 °F (13 °C), and never below 25 °F (−4 °C), although it is preferable that the lower limit is between 41 and 50 °F (5 and 10 °C).

Multiplication and propagation can occur both by seed and by cuttings.

== Subspecies ==
The following subspecies are currently accepted:

- Crassula rupestris subsp. commutata (Friedr.) Toelken
- Crassula rupestris subsp. marnieriana (Huber & Jacobsen) Toelken
