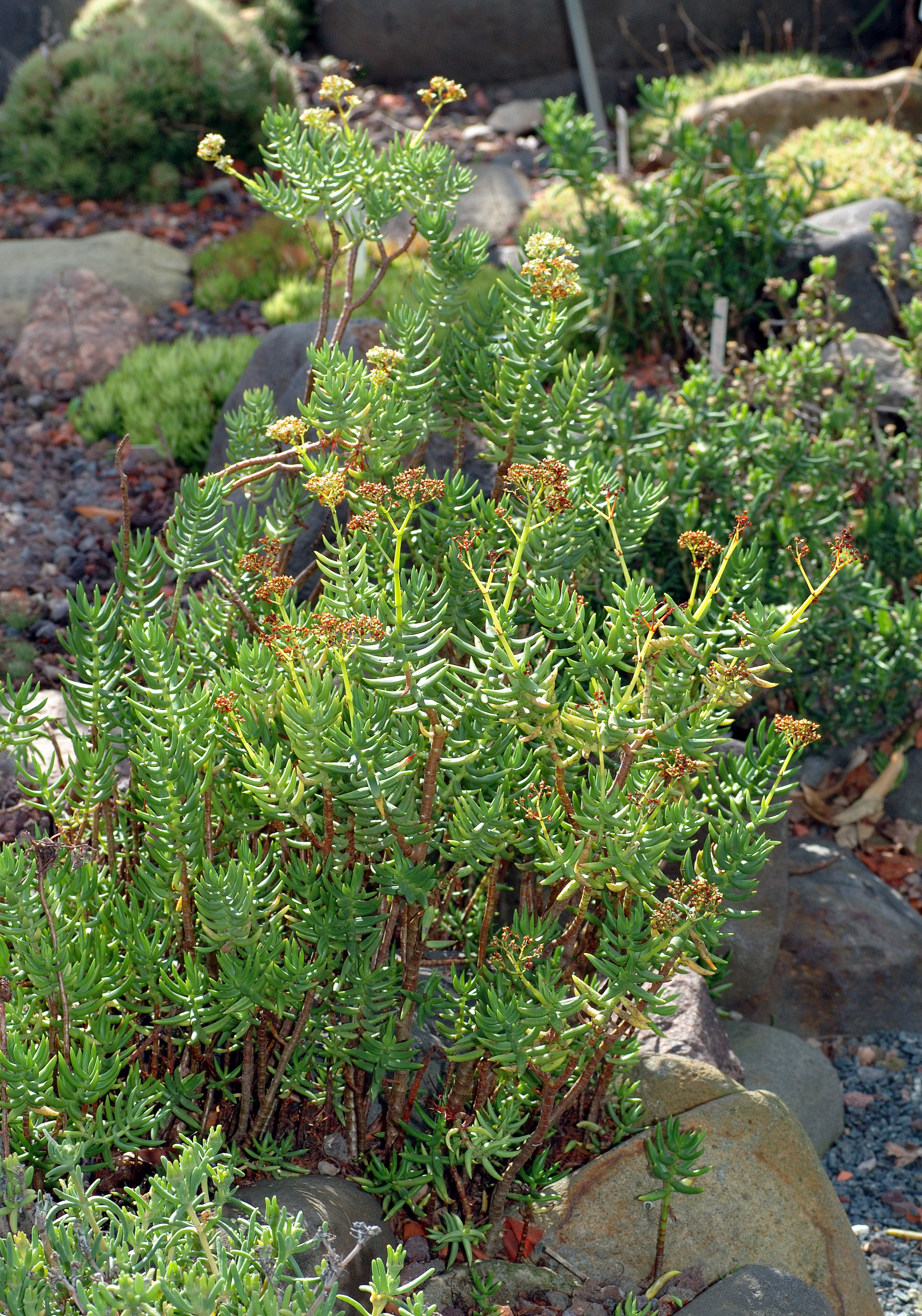
- Crassula tetragona subsp. robusta, the larger subspecies that is most commonly cultivated.

Scientific classification
- Kingdom: Plantae
- Clade: Tracheophytes
- Clade: Angiosperms
- Clade: Eudicots
- Order: Saxifragales
- Family: Crassulaceae
- Genus: Crassula
- Species: C. tetragona

Binomial name
- Crassula tetragona L.

= Crassula tetragona =

Species of succulent

Crassula tetragona is a succulent plant native to Southern Africa. It is widely distributed from the Orange River boundary of Namaqualand to beyond the Kei River in the Eastern Cape. "Tetragona" comes from the phyllotaxy of the leaves. It is popularly named the "miniature pine tree" among ornamental plant enthusiasts, for its popular use as a "pine tree" in Bonsai.

== Description ==
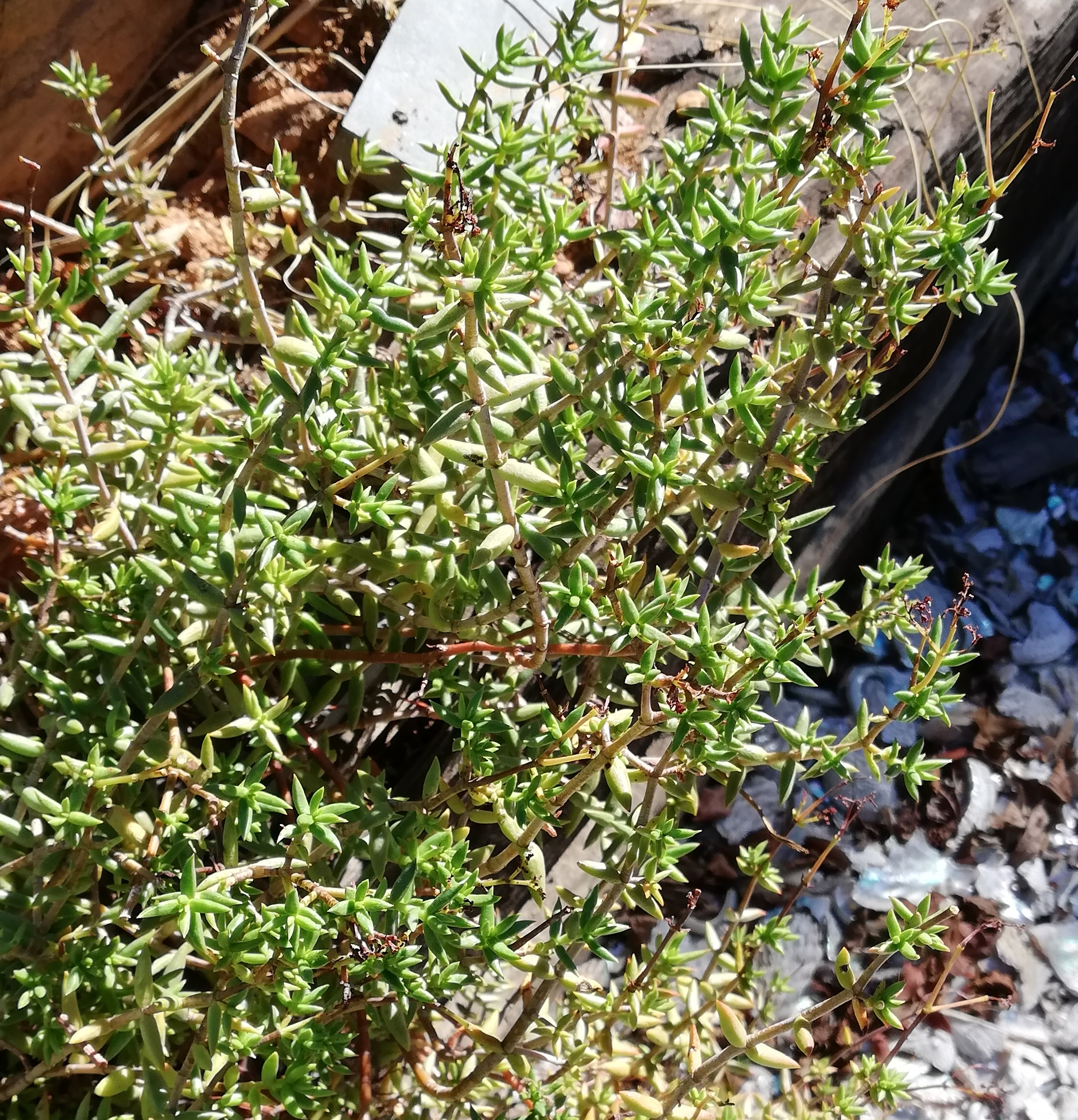
The decumbent stems of Crassula tetragona subsp. acutifolia

The plant is erect or spreads shrubless to 1 m (3 ft). It has woody stems with brown bark, with crossed pairs of leaves. Leaves are green to dark green in color. The plant features terminal inflorescence ending in white flowers that come up in summer. The chromosome number varies: 2n=16, 32, 48. The subspecies are separated geographically, generally with only one subspecies per geographic area.

== Taxonomy ==
The species was first described by Linnaeus in 1753 in his book Species Plantarum There are six recognized subspecies, originally named by Toelken, as follows:

- C. tetragona subsp. acutifolia, stems decumbent, rooting at internodes, and sharply acute leaf apices.
- C. tetragona subsp. tetragona, plant with multiple erect branches, and densely flowered inflorescence.
- C. tetragona subsp. rudis, plant with a single main erect branch, but loosely branched inflorescence.
- C. tetragona subsp. connivens, young stems are papillose, rounded flower thyrse
- C. tetragona subsp. lignescens, young stems are smooth, mature stems are woody, leaves relatively small. The most widespread subspecies.
- C. tetragona subsp. robusta, young stems are smooth, stems all carnose, leaves are large and robust. The most commonly cultivated subspecies.

== Usage ==
These plants are usually used as an ornamental, although they are believed to have been used as a medicinal plant by Thunberg, who wrote: "Crassula tetragona, somewhat of an stringent nature, boiled in milk, in the quantity of a handful, is used as a remedy for diarrhea."

== Growth patterns ==
The plant requires a reasonable amount of water; more water is needed if flower buds are present. Most species prefer full sun, although some sub-species could be sensitive to too much sun. The plant is resistant to frost, but temperatures above 40 °F (4 °C) (6C) are best. The plant may be propagated from leaves and cuttings. It does not suffer from pests, other than the occasional mealy bug.

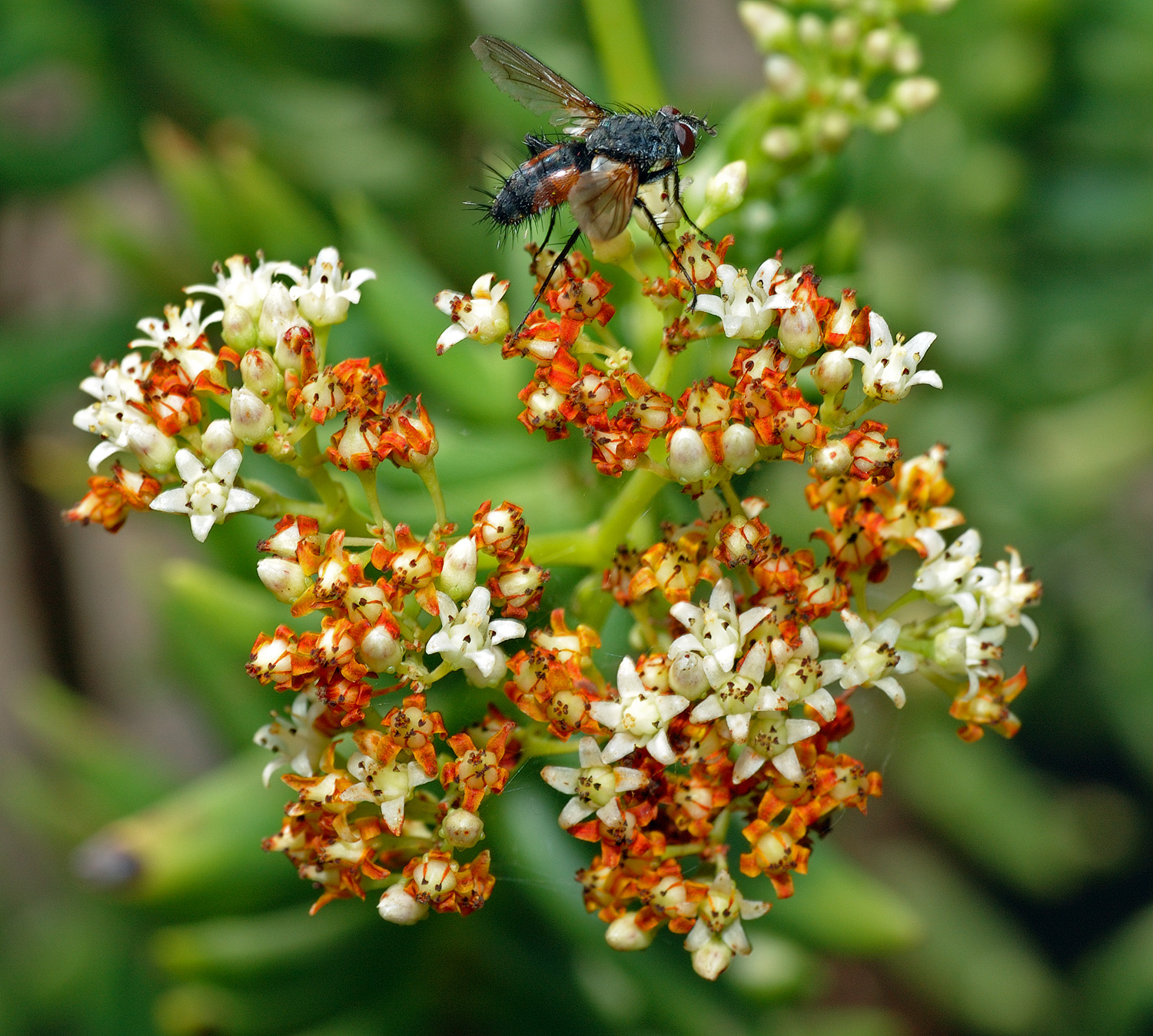
Inflorescence of Crassula tetragona subsp. robusta

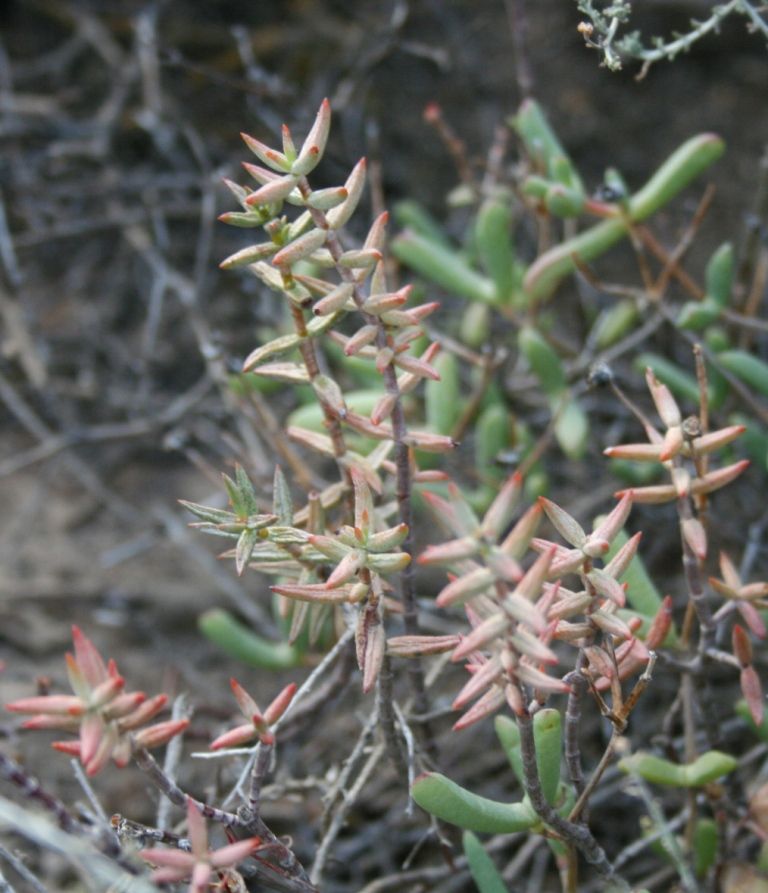
Leaf detail of Crassula tetragona subsp. lignescens, the gracile subspecies most widespread in habitat
