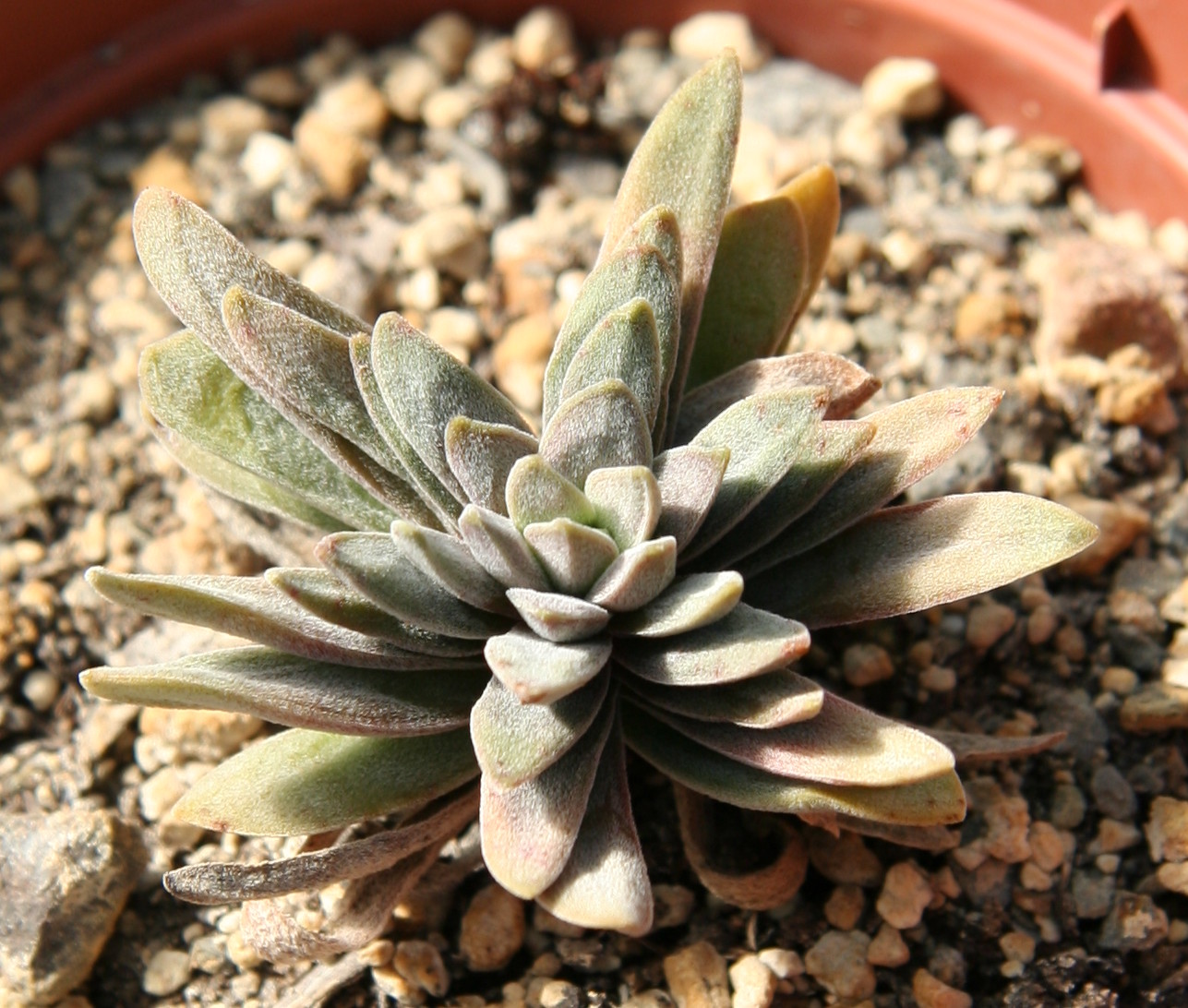
- Crassula nudicaulis

Scientific classification
- Kingdom: Plantae
- Clade: Tracheophytes
- Clade: Angiosperms
- Clade: Eudicots
- Order: Saxifragales
- Family: Crassulaceae
- Genus: Crassula
- Species: C. nudicaulis

Binomial name
- Crassula nudicaulis L.

Synonyms
- Crassula cephalophora Thunb.; Crassula obvallata L.

= Crassula nudicaulis =

Species of succulent

Crassula nudicaulis is a succulent plant native to South Africa (the Cape Provinces, the Free State, KwaZulu-Natal and the Northern Provinces), and Lesotho.

== Description ==
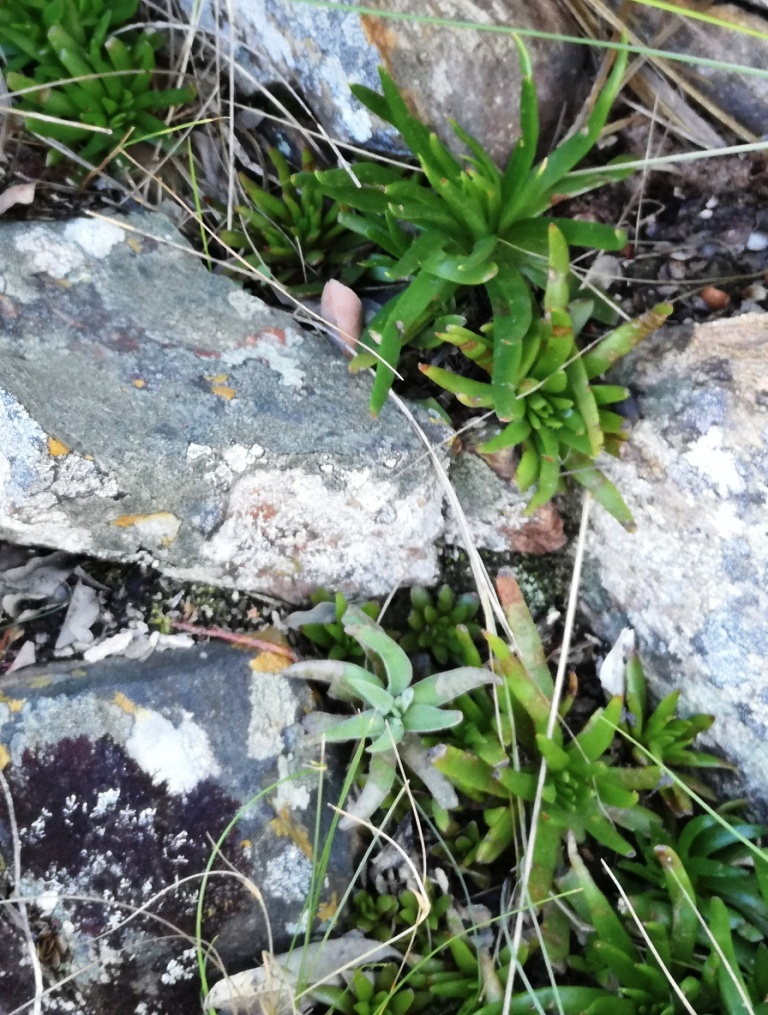
Both hairy and smooth-leaved Crassula nudicaulis var. nudicaulis specimens of a long-leaved form

Crassula nudicaulis is a perennial succulent herb with a thickened taproot and several low rosettes of basal leaves. Plants are somewhat variable in appearance and there are several subspecies over the plant's wide range.

The leaves of this species can turn brown, but they do not adopt the brick red hues sometimes taken on by Crassula subacaulis and Crassula clavata.

The inflorescence is a spike, with bracts that are not ciliate; the lowest one to three pairs of bracts have no flowers in the axils but the others do. The flowers are turned upwards, they have yellow anthers and distinctive dorsal appendages.

This species is closely related to Crassula cotyledonis, which is a more robust species that has marginal leaf-hair in more than one line. It can also be confused with Crassula clavata, but that species has glabrous (smooth), oblanceolate-obovate leaves that turn deep purple-red in the sun.

=== Subspecies variation ===
This species is variable, and several subspecies exist:

  - subsp. nudicaulis: The nominate subspecies has oblong-elliptic (cylindrical), reddish-green leaves that are 50 to 80 mm (2 to 3 in) long and faintly pubescent.
  - subsp. herrei: This Richtersveld subspecies has shorter, thicker, more fleshy, hairless leaves, 30 to 40 mm (1.2 to 1.6 in) long, but can grow into a shrubby bush up to 25 cm (10 in) tall.
  - subsp. platyphylla: This southern Karoo subspecies has blue-grey foliage; the leaves are broadly oblong to orbicular with cilia near the margins.
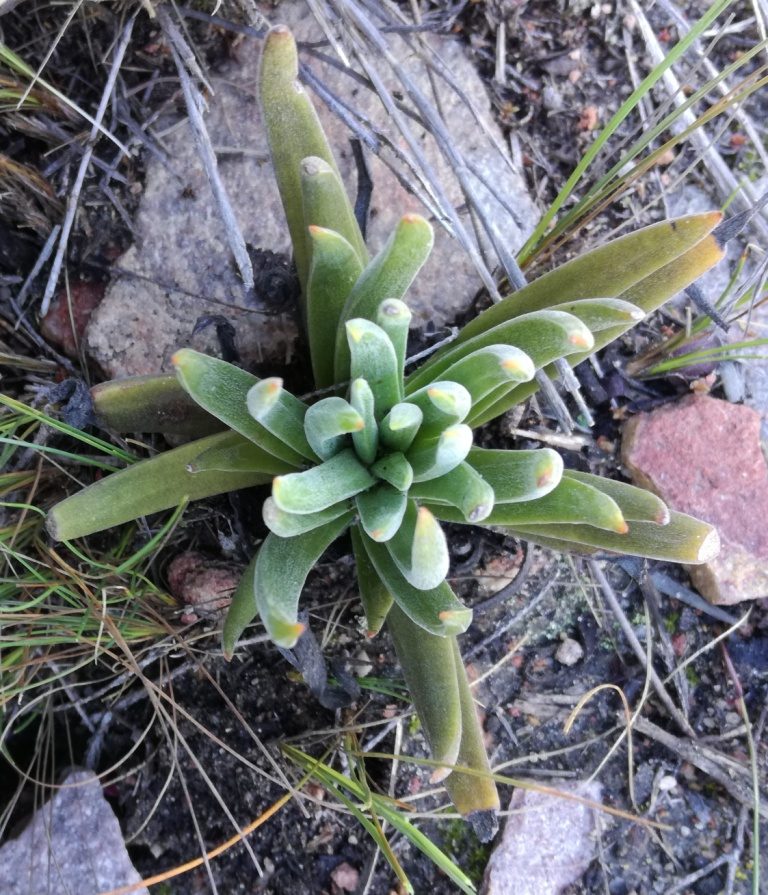
C. nudicaulis var. nudicaulis

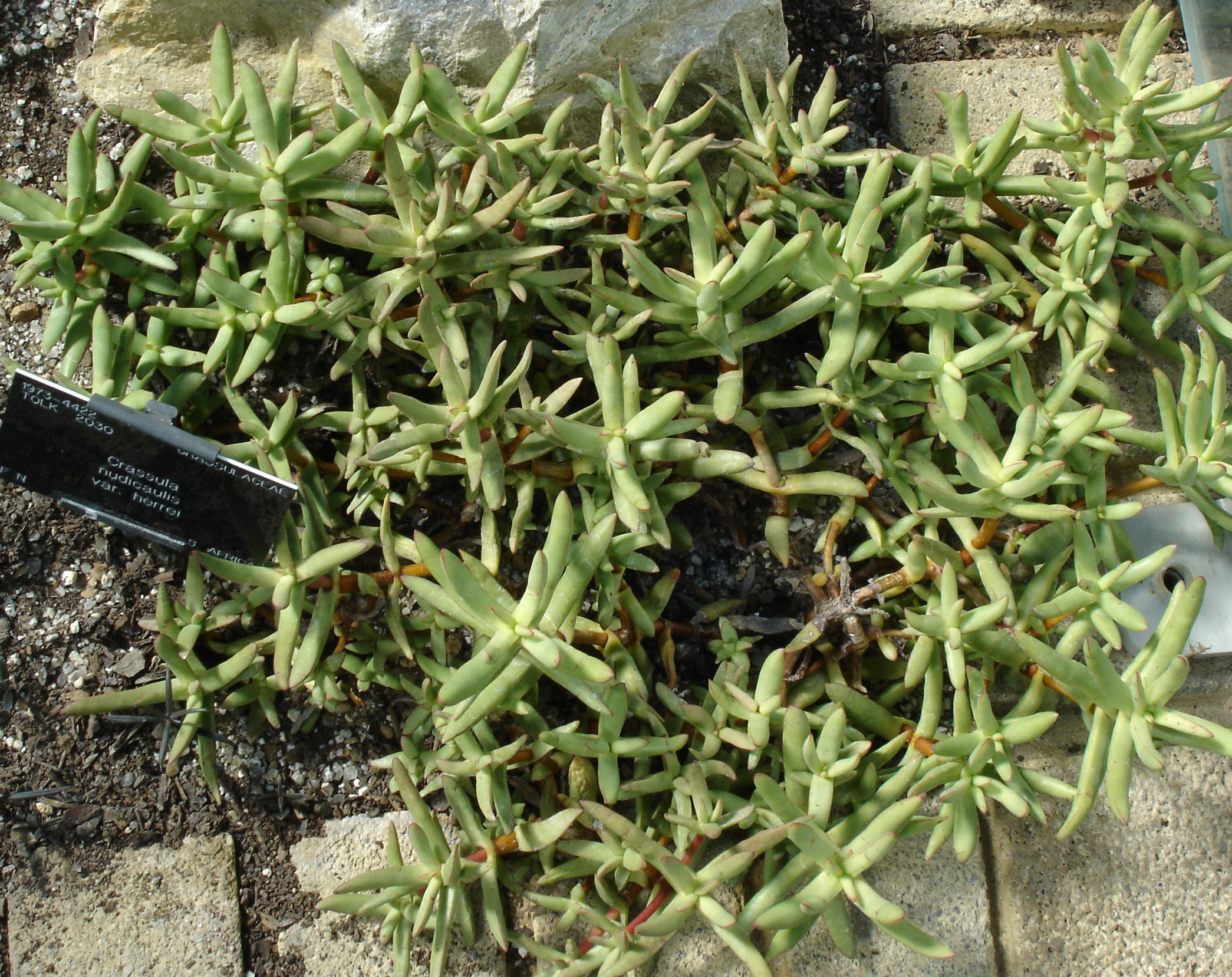
C. nudicaulis var. herrei from the Namaqualand and Richtersveld regions.

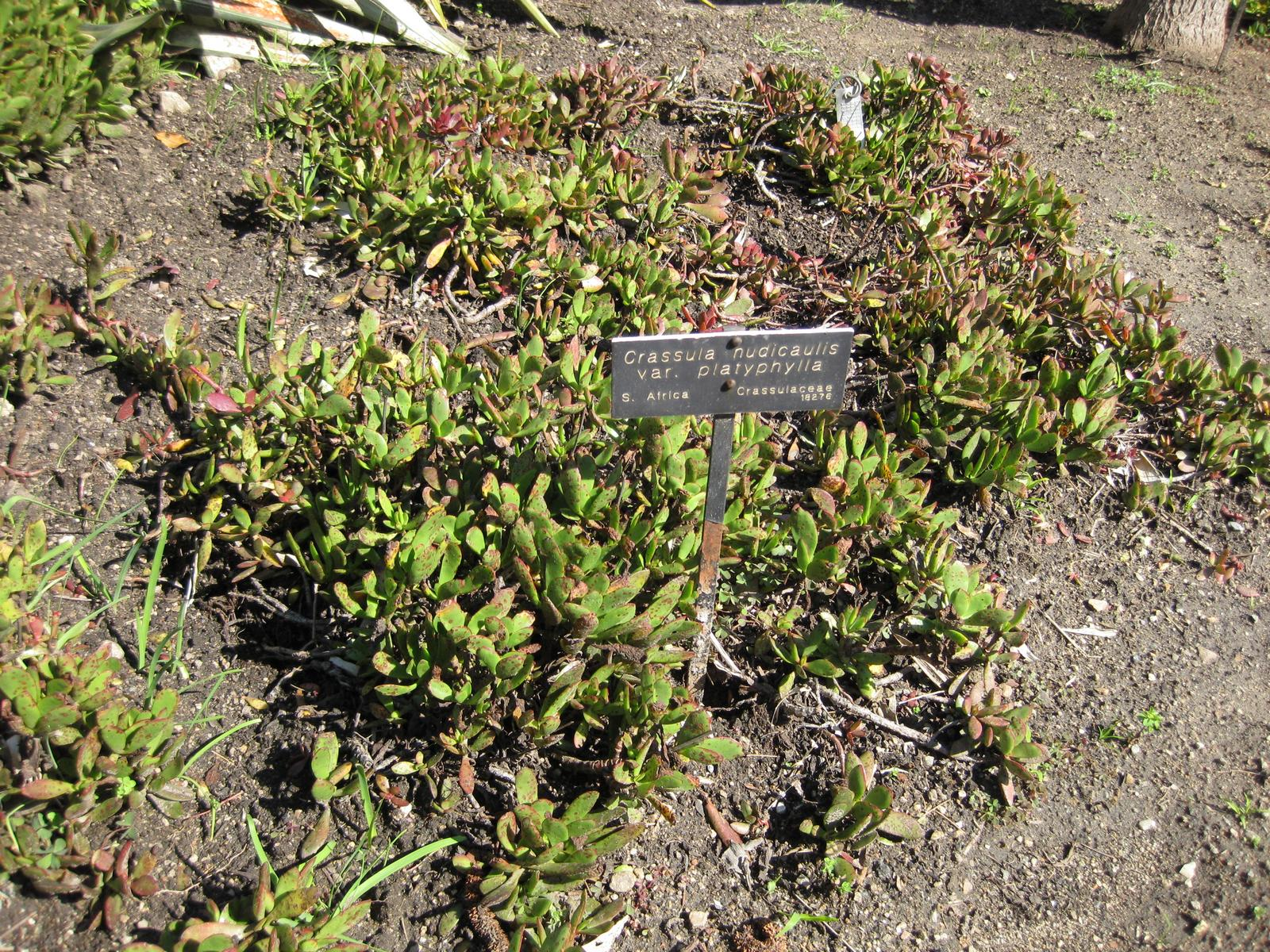
C. nudicaulis var. platyphylla from the southern Karoo region

== Distribution and habitat ==
Crassula nudicaulis is native to southern Africa where its range extends from the Western Cape to the Eastern Cape, KwaZulu-Natal, Free State and Lesotho. Its habitat is hillside and mountain slopes.

== Cultivation ==
Crassula nudicaulis is easy to grow as a potplant in a gravelly medium. Mealy bugs and fungal diseases can cause problems, and over-watering should be avoided. Propagation is by division, offsets or leaf cuttings.
