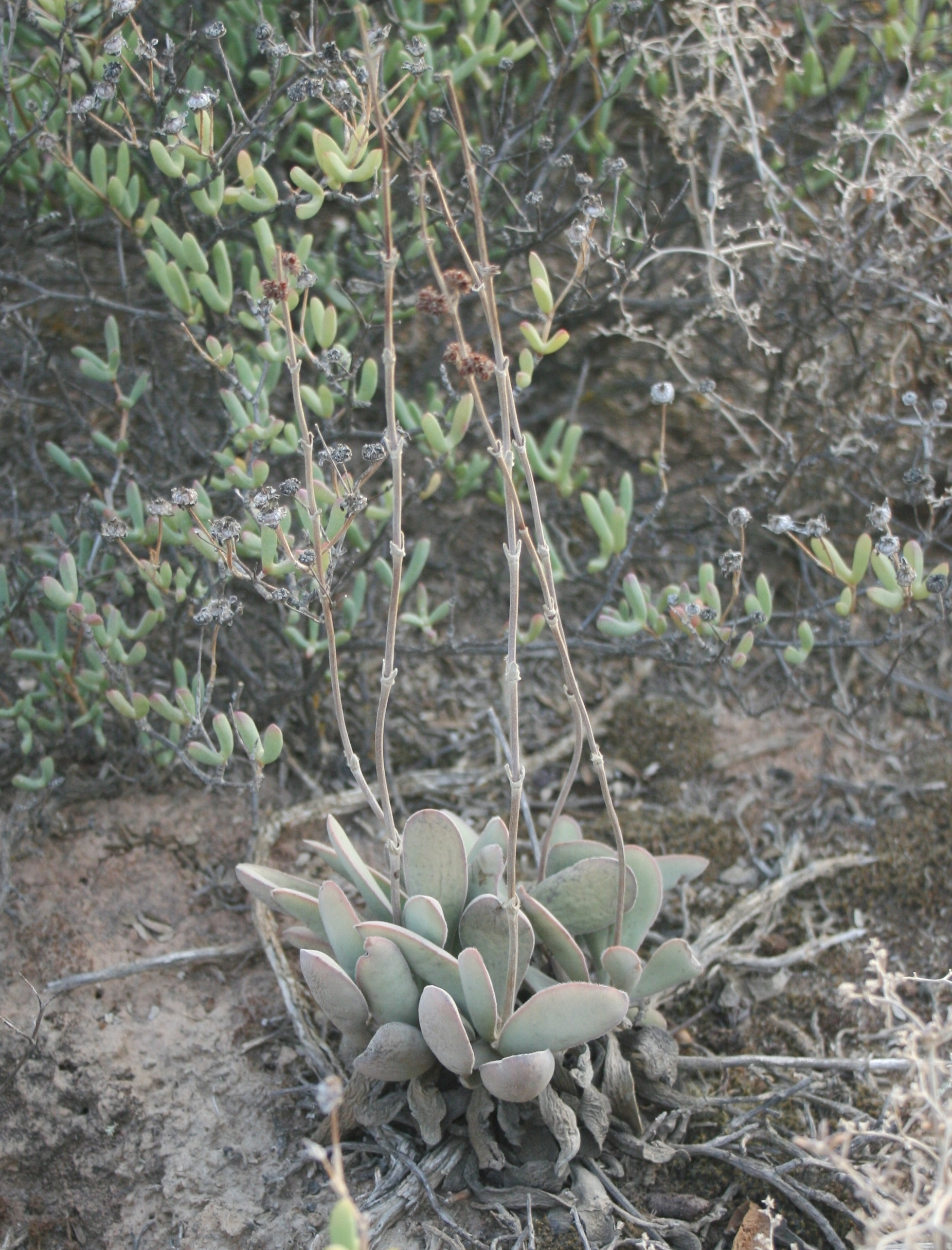
- Crassula cotyledonis in habitat, in the Robertson Karoo

Scientific classification
- Kingdom: Plantae
- Clade: Tracheophytes
- Clade: Angiosperms
- Clade: Eudicots
- Order: Saxifragales
- Family: Crassulaceae
- Genus: Crassula
- Species: C. cotyledonis

Binomial name
- Crassula cotyledonis Thunb.

= Crassula cotyledonis =

Species of succulent

Crassula cotyledonis is a succulent plant endemic to the arid Namaqualand and Karoo regions of South Africa.

== Description ==
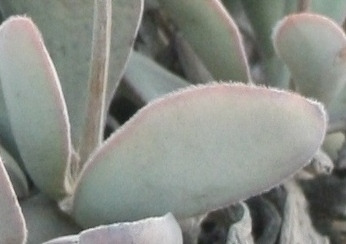
Detail of the cilia along the margins of C. cotyledonis grey, pubescent leaves

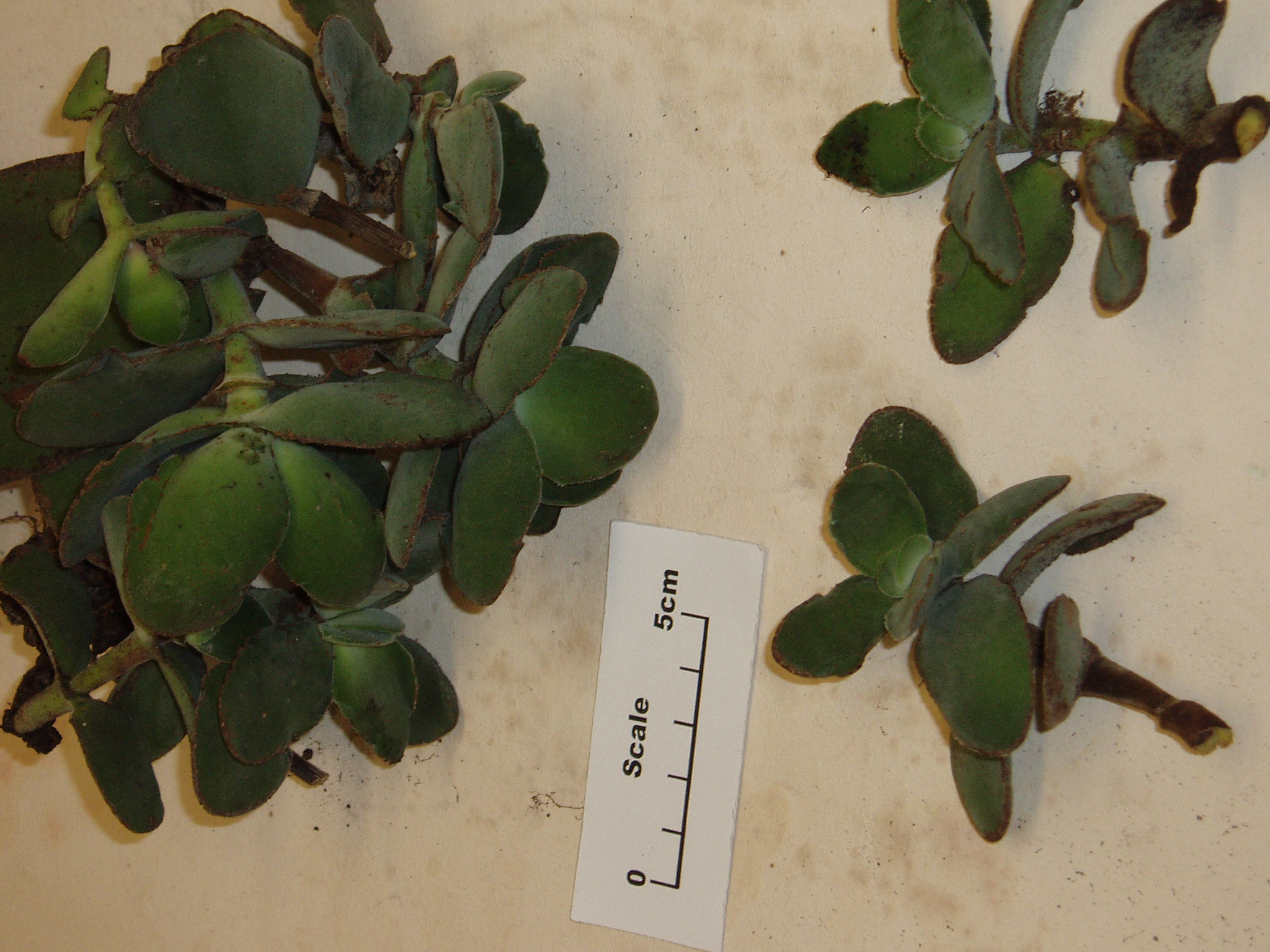
C. cotyledonis stem specimens

This plant forms a low, sparse rosette. Its tiny, woody stem is short and against the ground. Its flattened, ovate (sickle/moon-shaped) leaves are usually a light grey-green colour, and can vary from narrowly-ovate (e.g. in the Karoo), to broadly ovate. The greyish leaves are pubescent (velvety) and the fine velvety fur points backward. There is also a line of short hairs along the leaf-margins.

The tiny, closed-tubular, globular flowers have 2-3 mm long petals, and are held in rounded bunches along the long, elongated flower-stem (peduncle 8-15 cm).

This species is closely related to Crassula nudicaulis, and resembles it in many ways. However, C. cotyledonis can always be distinguished by the cilia on the margins of the infertile bracts lower on its peduncle, which are not in one single row. The cilia on the margins near the tips of the leaves is similarly irregular and not in a single line. Other key diagnostic characters are the obovate or oblanceolate leaves having rough, backwards-curved hair, and the inflorescence having 3 to 6 infertile bracts near its base.

== Distribution and habitat ==
This species occurs from Worcester, through the Karoo regions as far east as the Eastern Cape Province, and north as far as Namibia.

It is normally found higher on hilltops and slopes, in very rocky ground and outcrops.

== Synonyms ==
- Crassula canescens var. latifolia Harv.
- Crassula cephalophora var. dubia (Schönland) Schönland
- Crassula cephalophora var. tayloriae Schönland
- Crassula dubia Schönland
- Crassula tayloriae Schönl.
- Globulea cotyledonis (Thunb.) P.V. Heath
- Purgosea cotyledonis (Thunb.) Sweet
