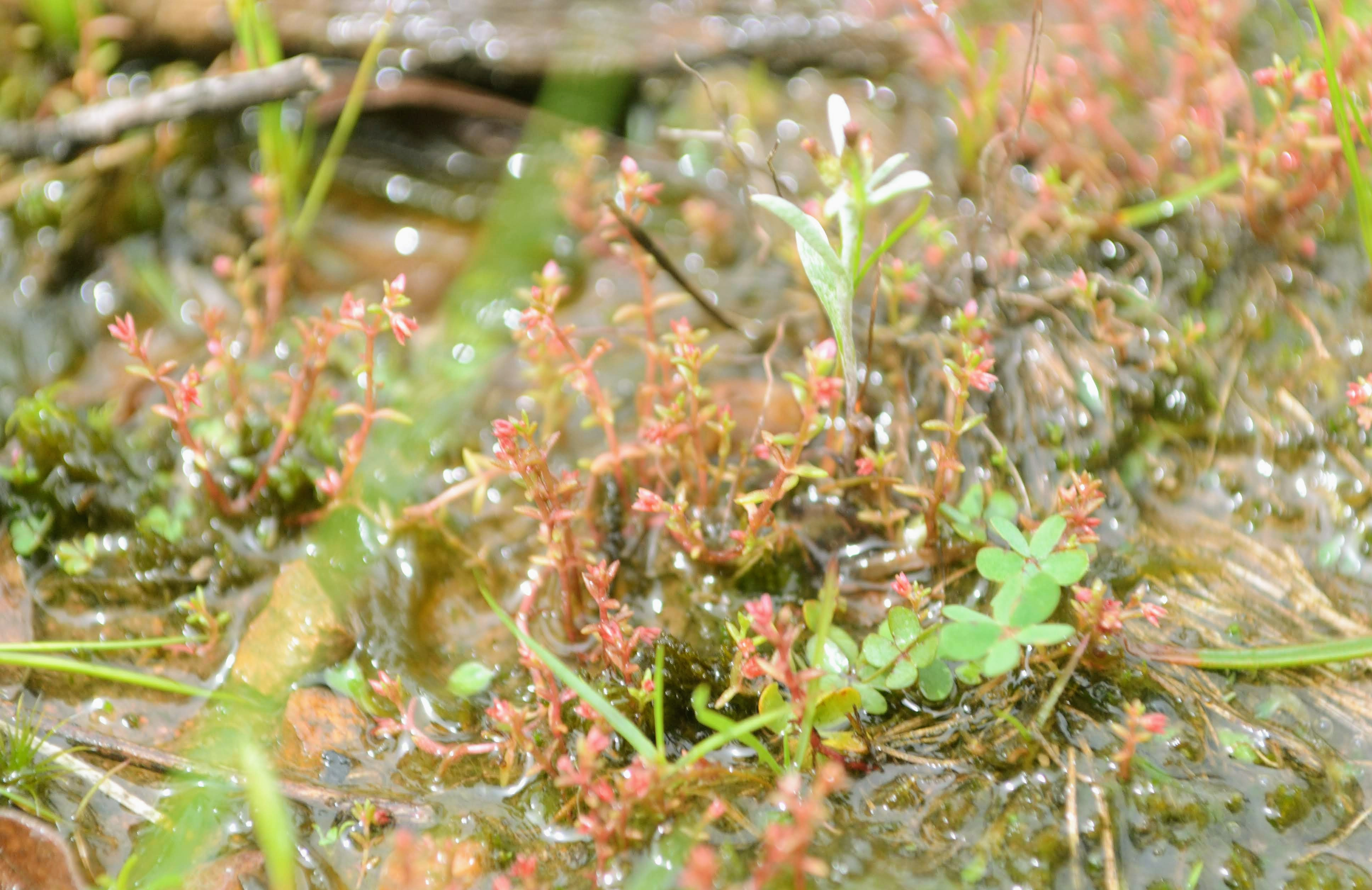

Scientific classification
- Kingdom: Plantae
- Clade: Tracheophytes
- Clade: Angiosperms
- Clade: Eudicots
- Order: Saxifragales
- Family: Crassulaceae
- Genus: Crassula
- Species: C. peduncularis

Binomial name
- Crassula peduncularis (Sm.) Meigen

= Crassula peduncularis =

Purple stonecrop

Species of plant

Crassula peduncularis, commonly known as purple stonecrop, is a herb in the family Crassulaceae. It is native to southern South America, Australia and New Zealand. It is an introduced species in Portugal, Germany and Japan.

The annual herb has an decumbent habit and typically grows to a height of 1 to 50 centimetres (0.4 to 19.7 in) and around 15 centimetres (5.9 in) wide. It blooms between September and October producing green-yellow-brown-red flowers.

In Australia, it is found in marshy areas and around ephemeral pools on granite outcrops in the Great Southern, Wheatbelt, South West, Peel and Goldfields-Esperance regions of Western Australia.
