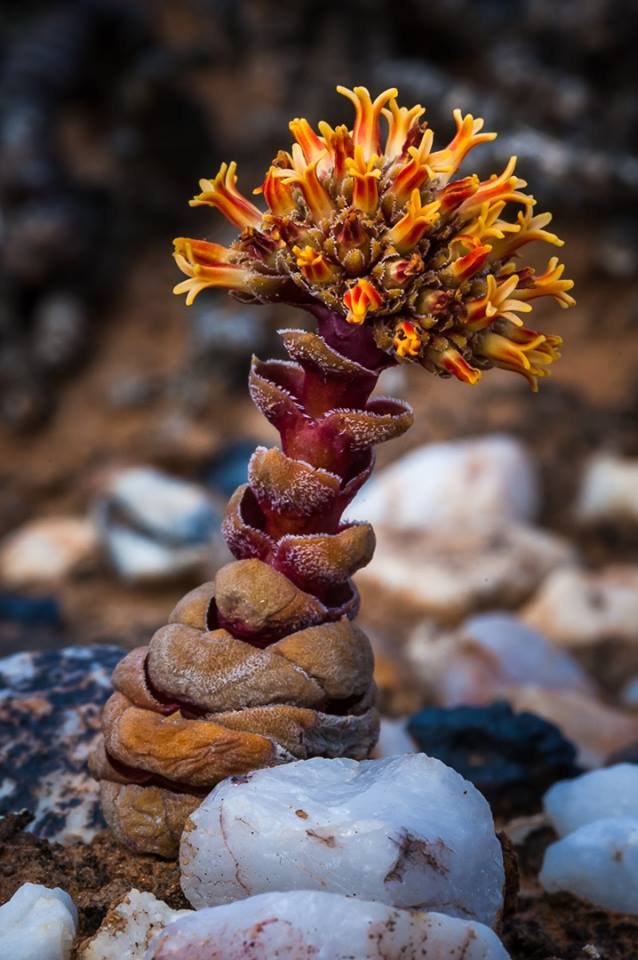

Conservation status
- Least Concern (SANBI Red List)

Scientific classification
- Kingdom: Plantae
- Clade: Tracheophytes
- Clade: Angiosperms
- Clade: Eudicots
- Order: Saxifragales
- Family: Crassulaceae
- Genus: Crassula
- Species: C. columnaris

Binomial name
- Crassula columnaris Thunb. (1778)

= Crassula columnaris =

Succulent endemic to the Cape Provinces

Crassula columnaris is a succulent plant native to South Africa and Namibia.
