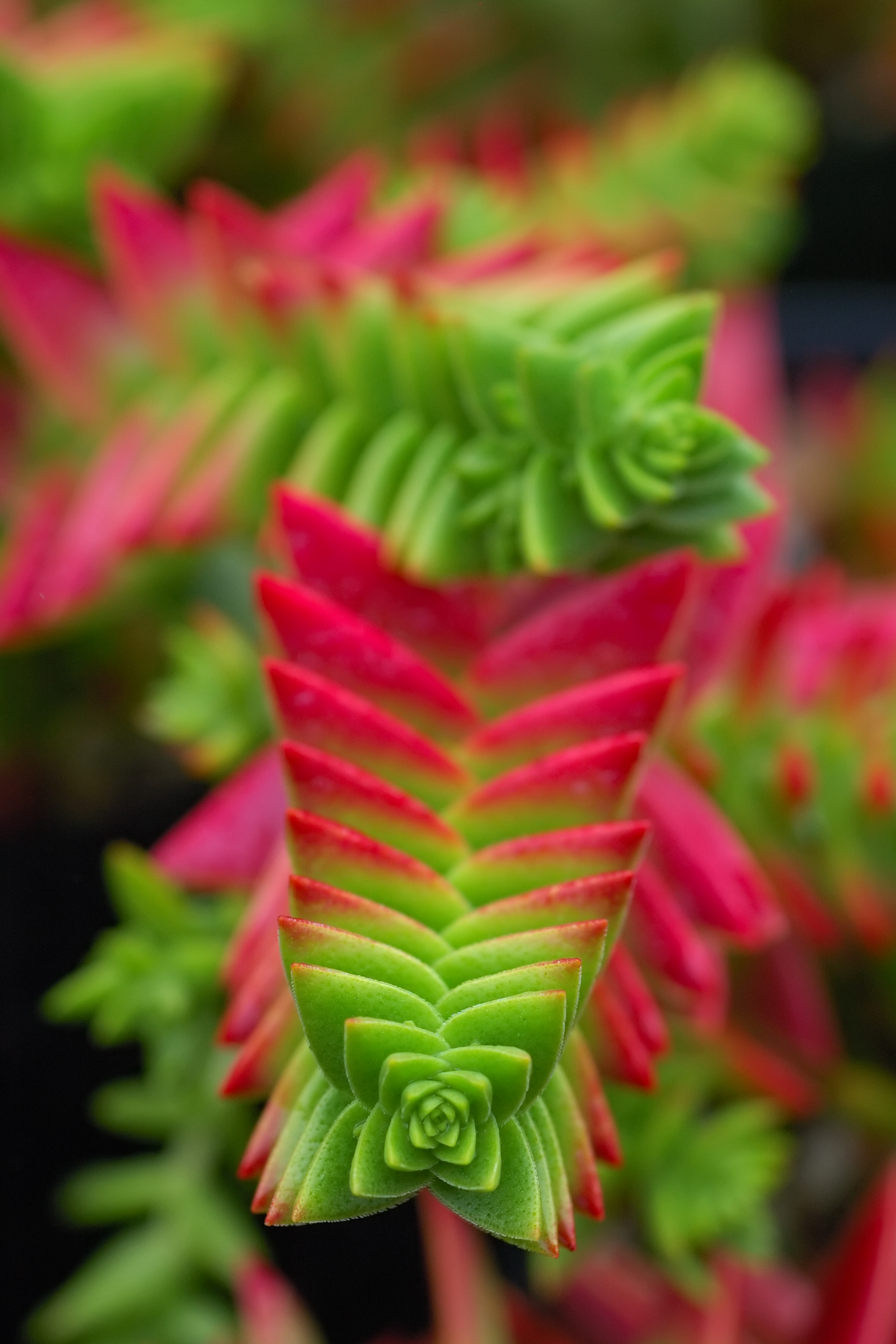
- Crassula capitella

Scientific classification
- Kingdom: Plantae
- Clade: Tracheophytes
- Clade: Angiosperms
- Clade: Eudicots
- Order: Saxifragales
- Family: Crassulaceae
- Subfamily: Crassuloideae
- Genus: Crassula; L.

Type species
- Crassula perfoliata L.

Diversity
- c. 250 species

Synonyms
- List: Bulliarda DC.; Combesia A.Rich.; Crassularia Hochst. ex Schweinf.; Creusa P.V.Heath; Curtogyne Haw.; Danielia Lem.; Dasystemon DC.; Dietrichia Tratt.; Dinacria Harv.; Globulea Haw.; Gomara Adans.; Grammanthes DC.; Helophytum Eckl. & Zeyh.; Kalorochea H.J.Veitch; Kalosanthes Haw.; Larochea Pers.; Mesanchum Dulac; Pagella Schönland; Petrogeton Eckl. & Zeyh.; × Purgobulea P.V.Heath; Purgosea Haw.; Rhopalota N.E.Br.; Rochea DC., nom. cons.; × Rocheassula G.D.Rowley; Sarcolipes Eckl. & Zeyh.; Septas L.; Septimia P.V.Heath; Sphaeritis Eckl. & Zeyh.; Tetraphyle Eckl. & Zeyh.; Thisantha Eckl. & Zeyh.; Tillaea L.; Tillaeastrum Britton; Toelkenia P.V.Heath; Turgosea Haw.; Vauanthes Haw.

= Crassula =

Genus of plants

Crassula is a genus of succulent plants containing about 200 accepted species, including the popular jade plant (Crassula ovata). They are members of the stonecrop family (Crassulaceae) and are native to many parts of the globe, but cultivated varieties originate almost exclusively from species from the Eastern Cape of South Africa.

Crassulas are usually propagated by stem or leaf cuttings. Most cultivated forms will tolerate some small degree of frost, but extremes of cold or heat will cause them to lose foliage and die.

== Taxonomy ==
Crassula was first formally described by Carl Linnaeus in 1753 with 10 species.

=== Etymology ===
The name crassula comes from the Latin adjective crassus, meaning thick, referring to the thickening of the succulent leaves.

=== Selected species ===
- Crassula alata
- Crassula alba
- Crassula alpestris (Sand-Coated Crassula)
- Crassula alstonii
- Crassula aquatica (common pigmyweed, water pygmyweed)
- Crassula arborescens (silver dollar plant, beestebul)
- Crassula atropurpurea
- Crassula ausensis
  - Crassula ausensis ssp. titanopsis
- Crassula barbata
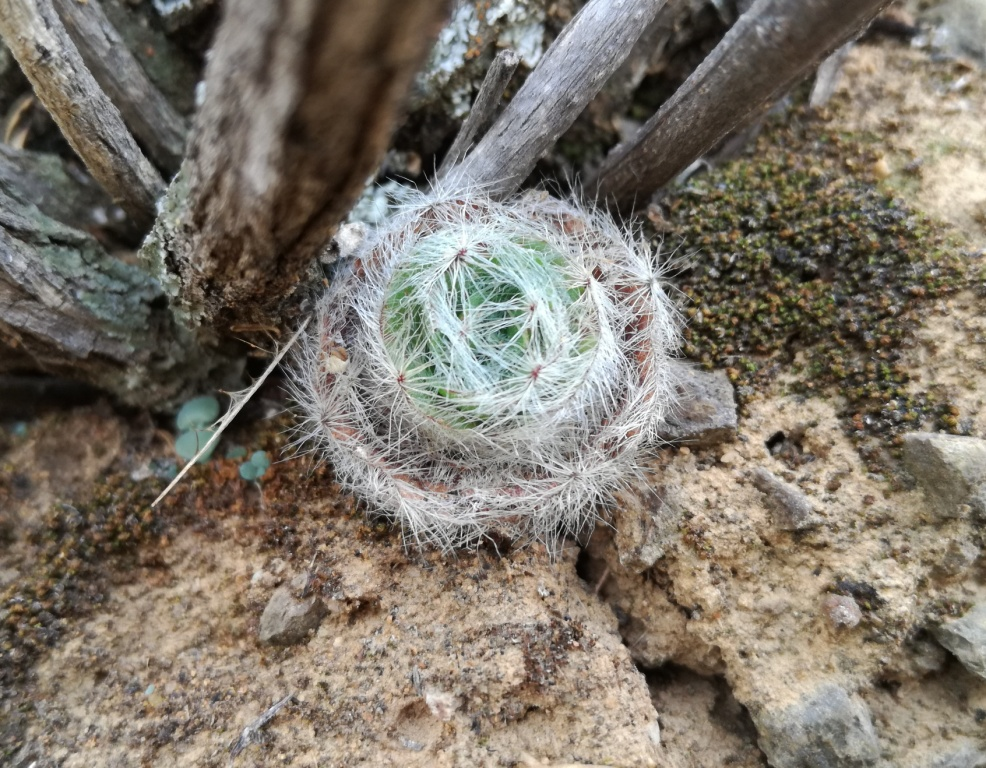
  Crassula barbata
- Crassula barklyi (rattlesnake tail, wurmplakkie)
- Crassula biplanata
- Crassula brevifolia
- Crassula capitella
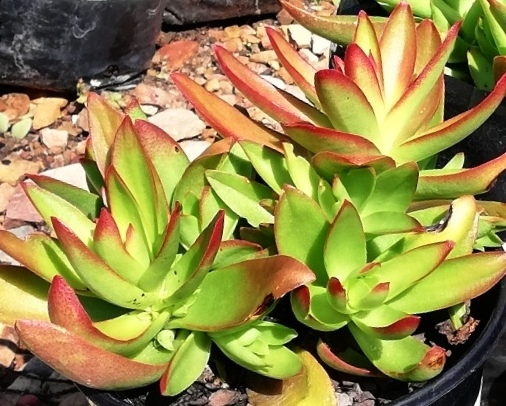
  Crassula capitella 'Campfire'
  - Crassula capitella ssp. thyrsiflora (aanteel-poprosie) 'Red Pagoda'
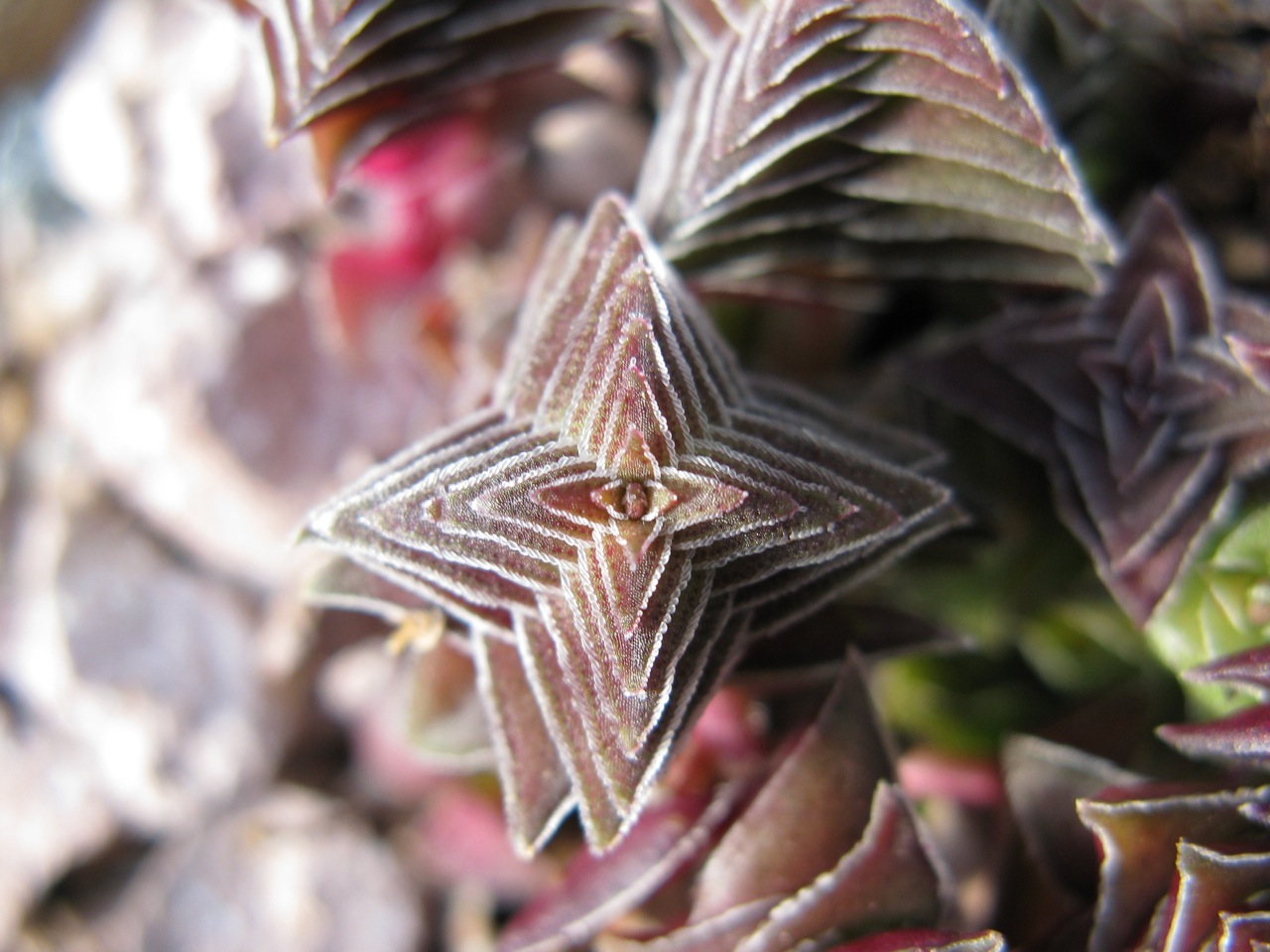
    Crassula capitella ssp. thyrsiflora 'Red Pagoda'
- Crassula clavata
- Crassula closiana
- Crassula colligata
- Crassula colorata (dense stonecrop)
- Crassula columella (silinderplakkie)
- Crassula columnaris (koesnaatjie)
- Crassula connata (sand pygmyweed)
- Crassula corallina
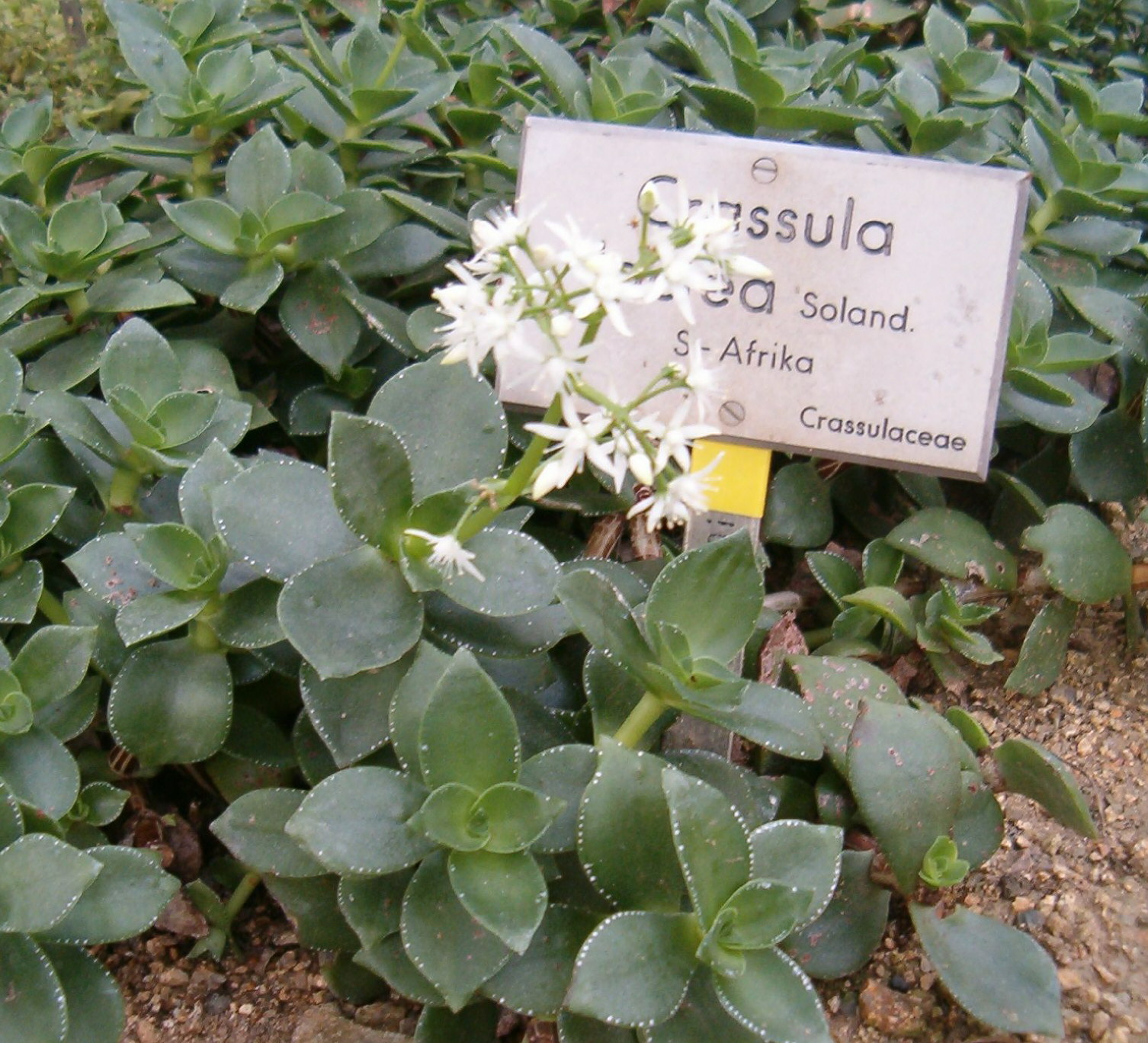
  Crassula lactea
- Crassula cotyledonis
- Crassula cultrata (plakkiebos)
- Crassula deceptor
- Crassula decumbens (scilly pigmyweed)
- Crassula dejecta
- Crassula deltoidea (silver beads, gruisplakkie)
- Crassula elegans (elegant crassula)
- Crassula exserta
- Crassula glomerata
- Crassula helmsii (swamp stonecrop)
- Crassula lactea (tailor's patch, Knysna crassula)
- Crassula marnieriana
- Crassula moschata (musky stonecrop, shore stonecrop)
- Crassula multicava (fairy crassula)
- Crassula muscosa (rattail crassula, watch chain, lizard's tail, zipper plant; syn. C. lycopodioides)
- Crassula namaquensis
  - C. namaquensis ssp. comptonii
- Crassula natans
- Crassula nudicaulis
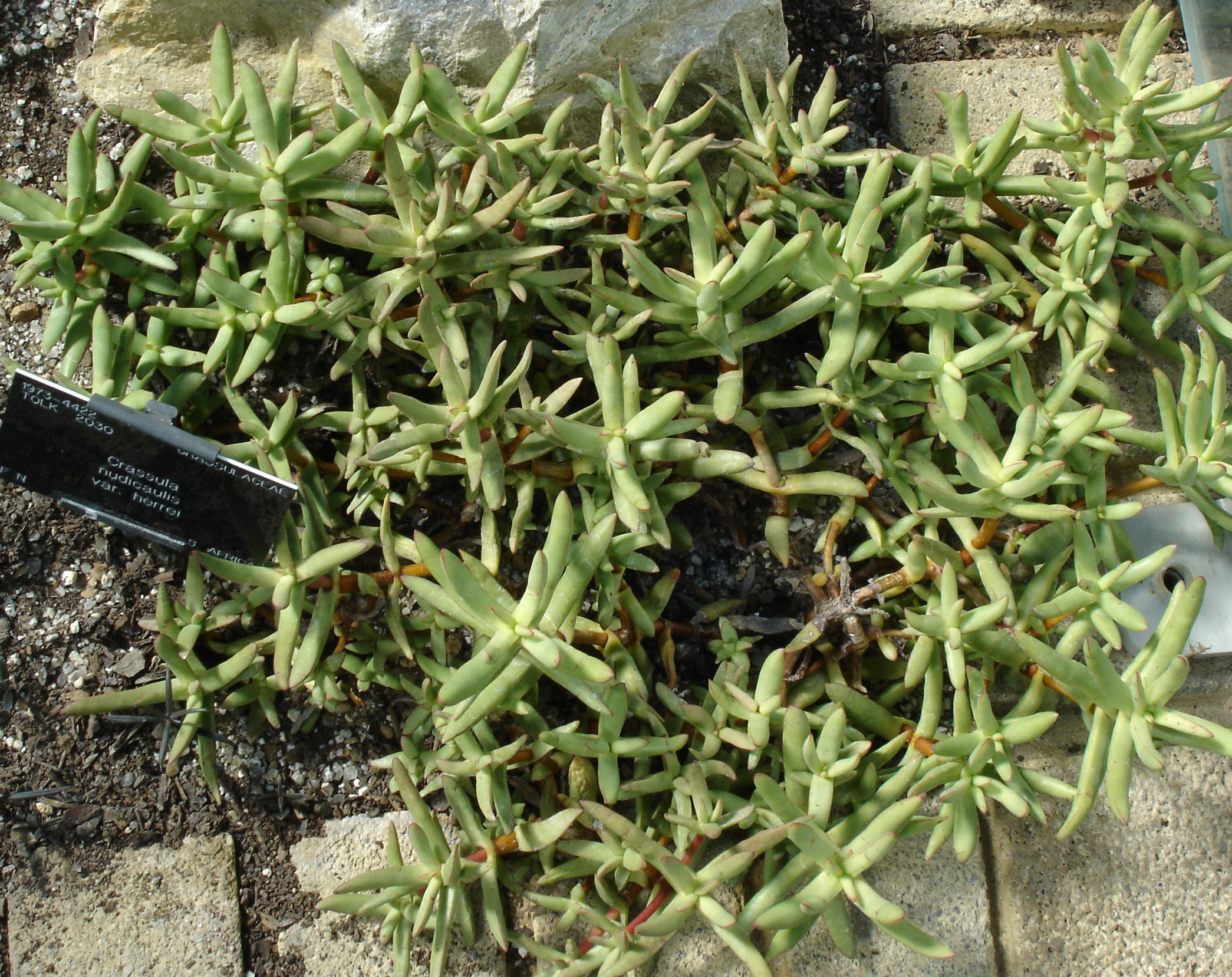
  Crassula nudicaulis var. herrei
  - C. nudicaulis var. herrei
  - C. nudicaulis var. platyphylla
- Crassula ovata ('jade' plant, 'money plant); syn. C. argentea, C. portulacea
  - C. ovata var. cristata
  - C. ovata var. monstruosa
  - C. ovata undulata ('ripple jade', 'wavy jade')
- Crassula peduncularis (purple stonecrop)
- Crassula pellucida
  - C. pellucida var. marginalis
- Crassula perfoliata
  - C. perfoliata var. falcata (propeller plant)
- Crassula perforata (string of buttons, sosatieplakkie)
- Crassula picturata
- Crassula pubescens (Jersey pigmyweed)
  - Crassula pubescens ssp. radicans
  - Crassula pubescens ssp. rattrayi
- Crassula rubricaulis
- Crassula rupestris (rosary plant, kebab bush, concertina plant, sosatiebos, inrygertjie)
  - C. rupestris ssp. marnierana
- Crassula sarcocaulis (bonsai crassula)
- Crassula sarmentosa
- Crassula setulosa (South African pygmyweed)
- Crassula sieberiana (Austral stonecrop)
- Crassula subaphylla
- Crassula tecta
- Crassula tetragona
- Crassula tetramera
- Crassula thunbergiana
- Crassula tillaea (moss pygmyweed)
- Crassula umbella

=== List of selected cultivars ===
- Crassula 'Buddha's Temple'
- Crassula 'Coralita'
- Crassula 'Dorothy'
- Crassula 'Emerald'
- Crassula 'Fallwood'
- Crassula 'Hummel's Sunset'
- Crassula 'Ivory Pagoda'
- Crassula 'Justus Corderoy'
- Crassula 'Morgan's Beauty'
- Crassula 'Moonglow'
- Crassula 'Petite Bicolor,' sometimes sold as Sedum 'Little Missy' or 'Mini Kitty', a cultivar of Crassula pellucida var. marginalis 'Calico Kitten'
- Crassula 'Springtime'
- Crassula 'Tom Thumb'

== Gallery ==
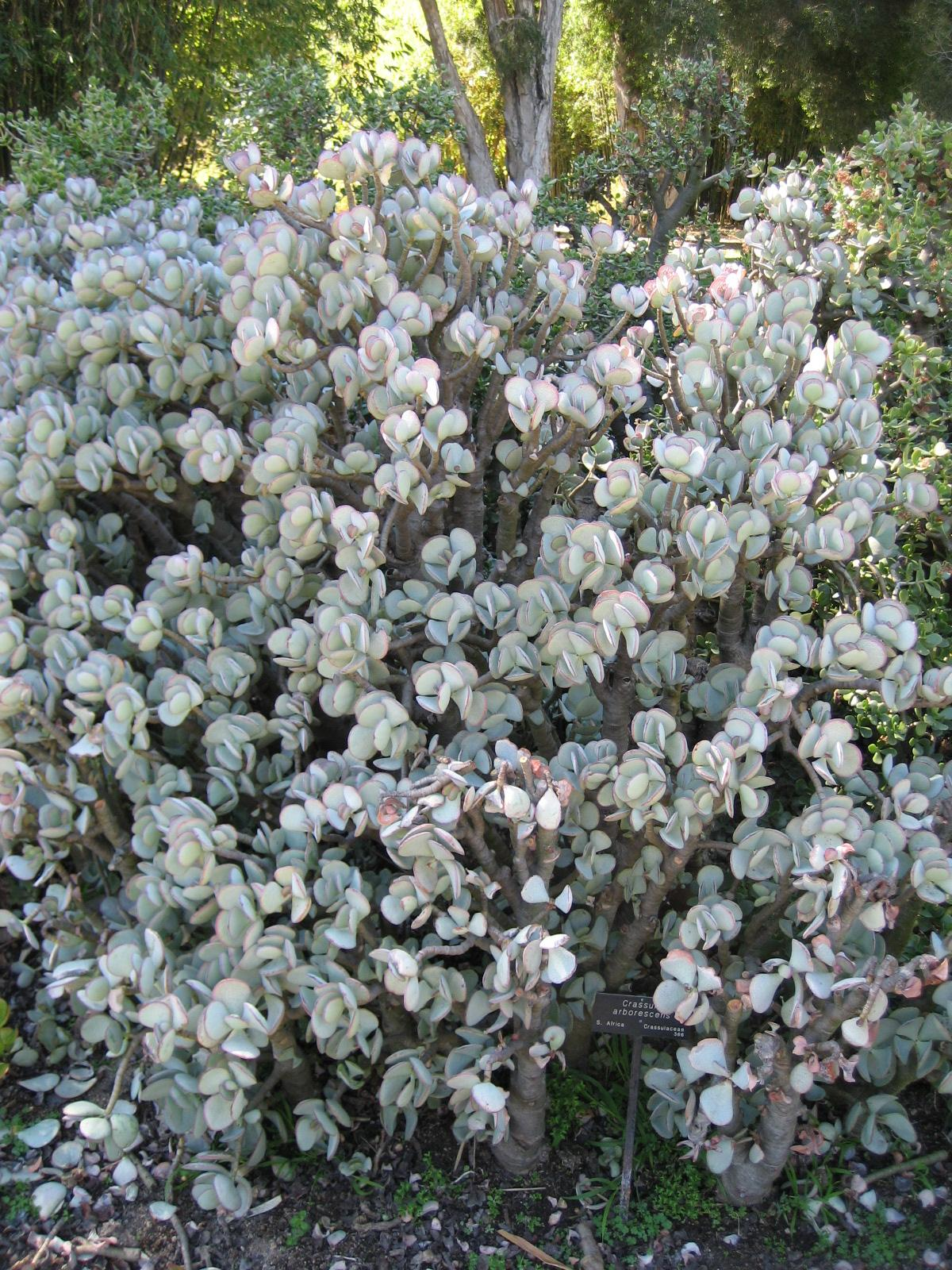
Crassula arborescens

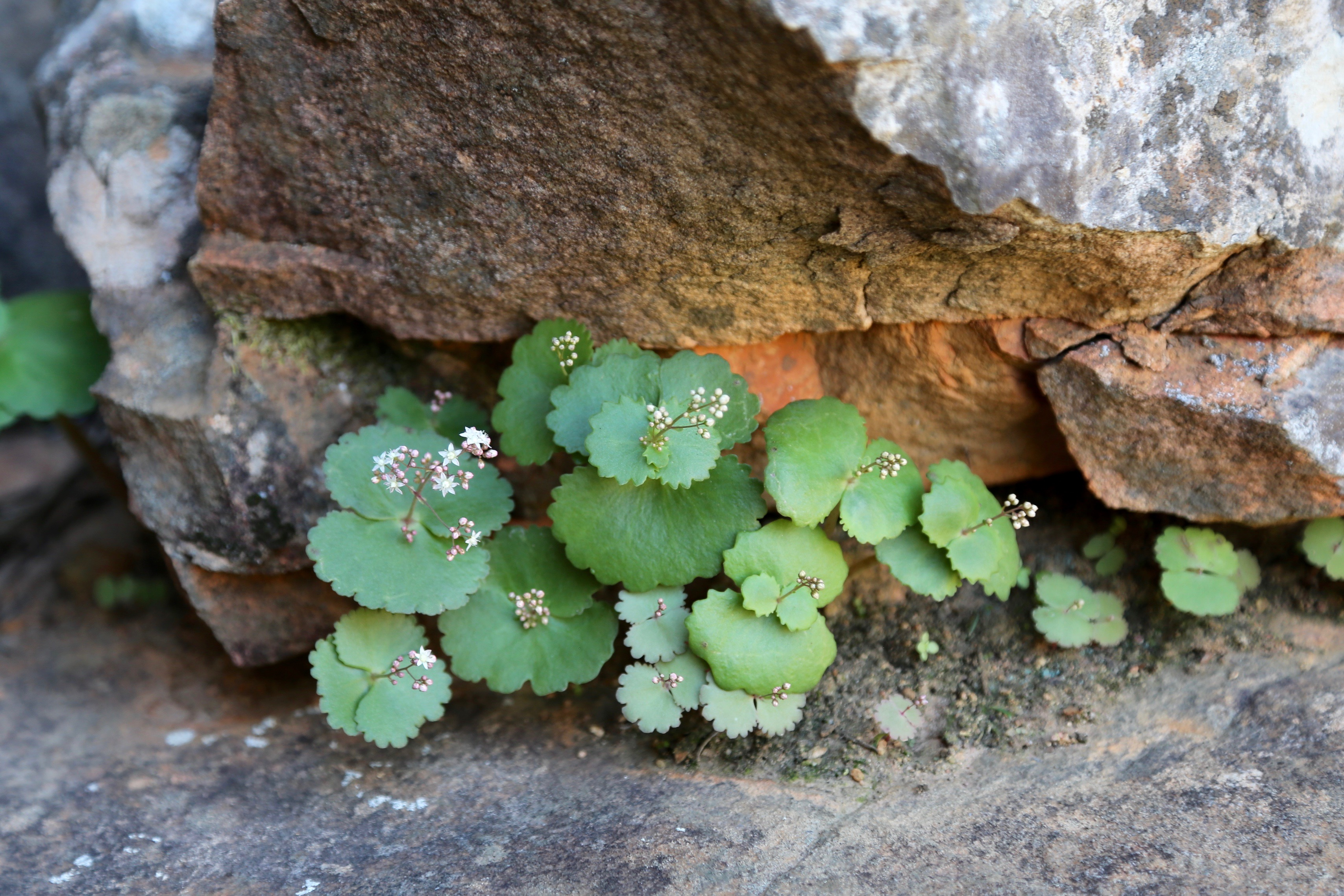
Crassula capensis

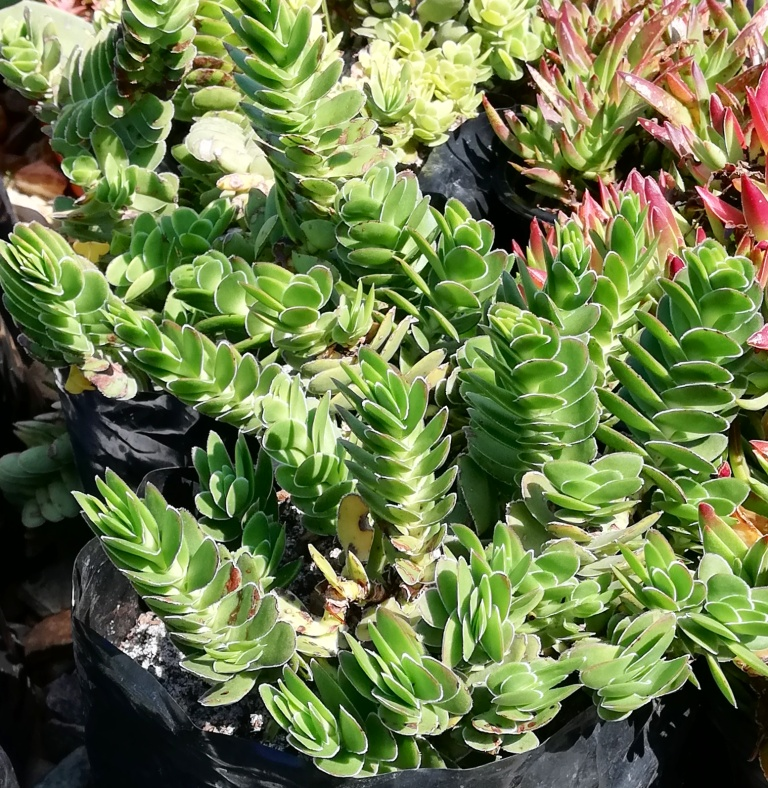
Crassula ciliata

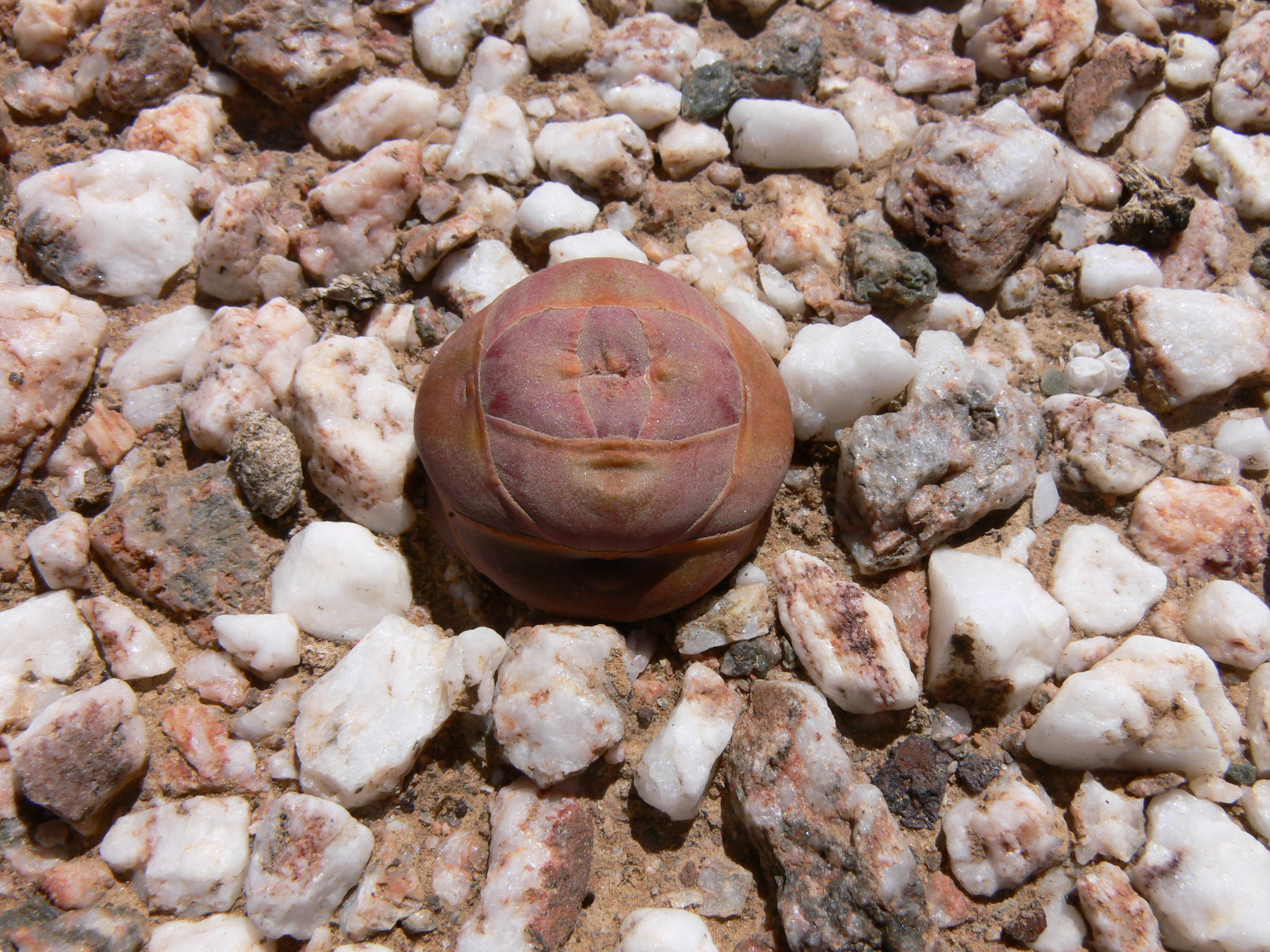
Crassula columnaris

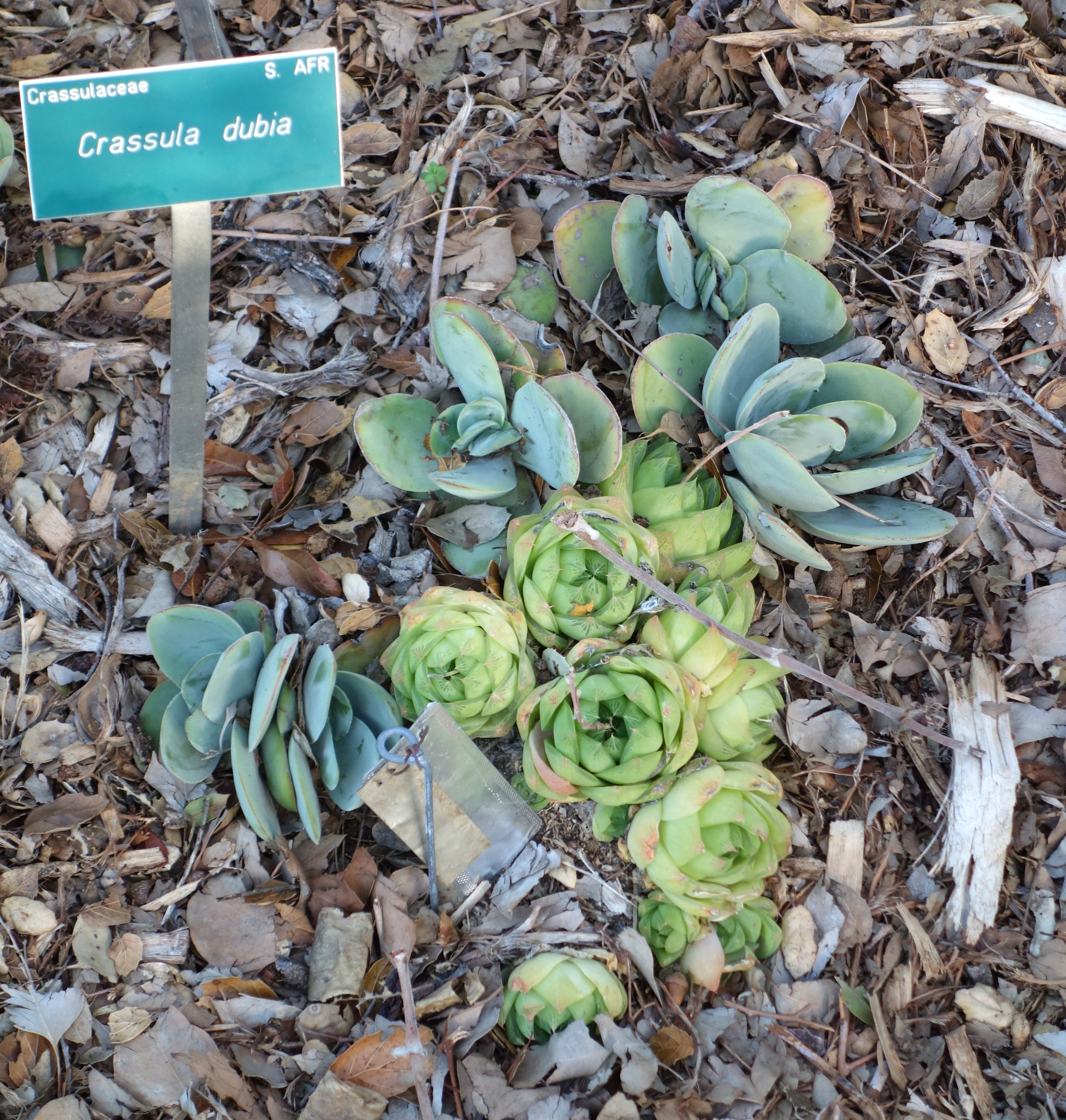
Crassula cotyledonis

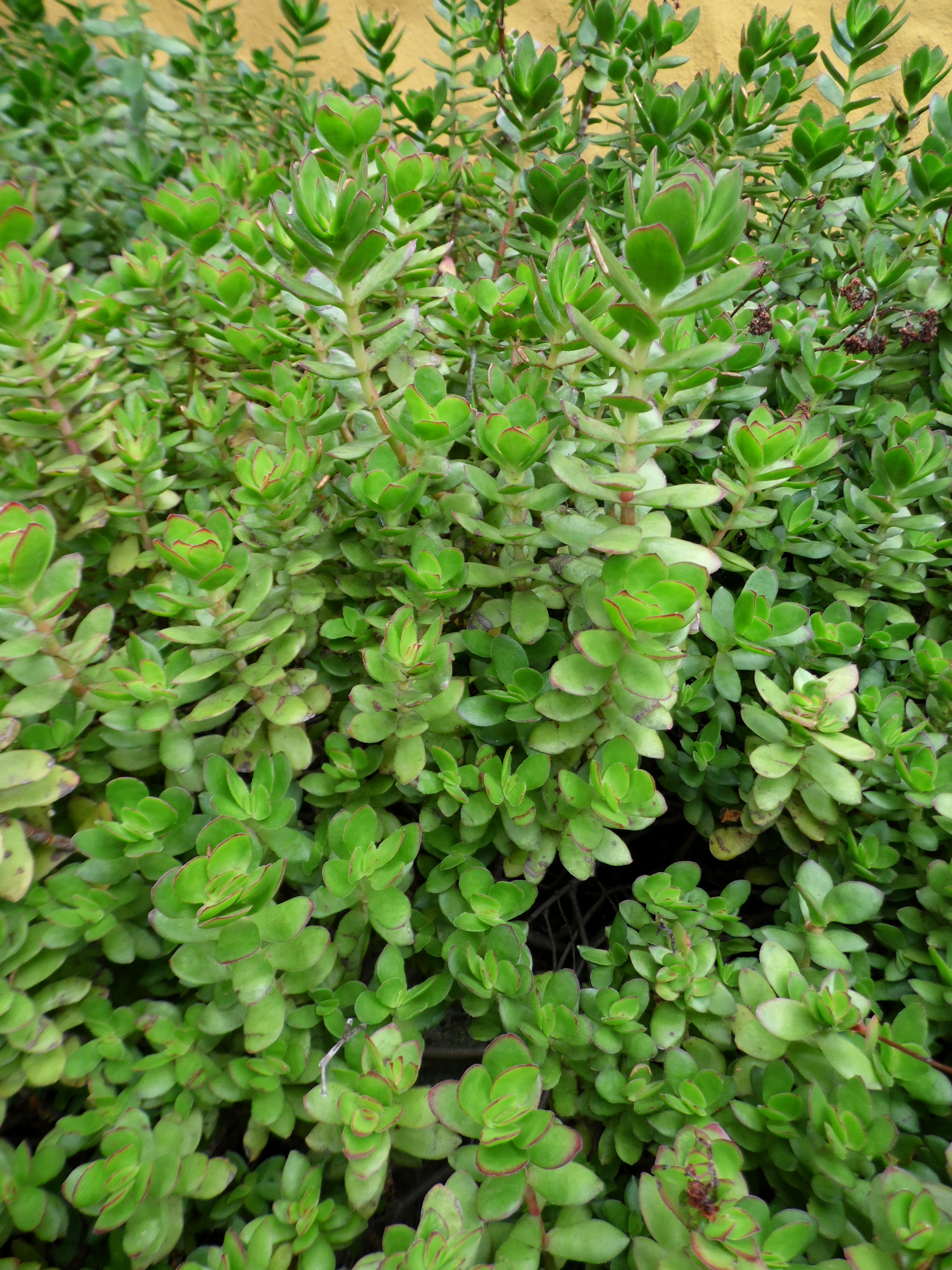
Crassula cultrata

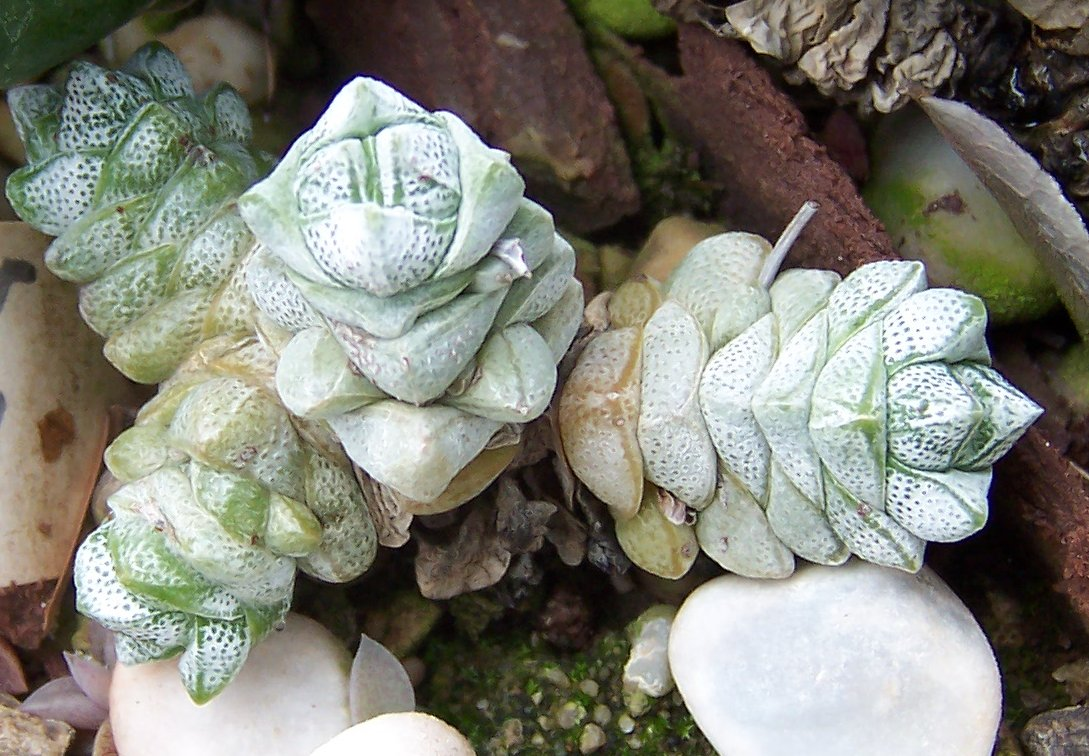
Crassula deceptor

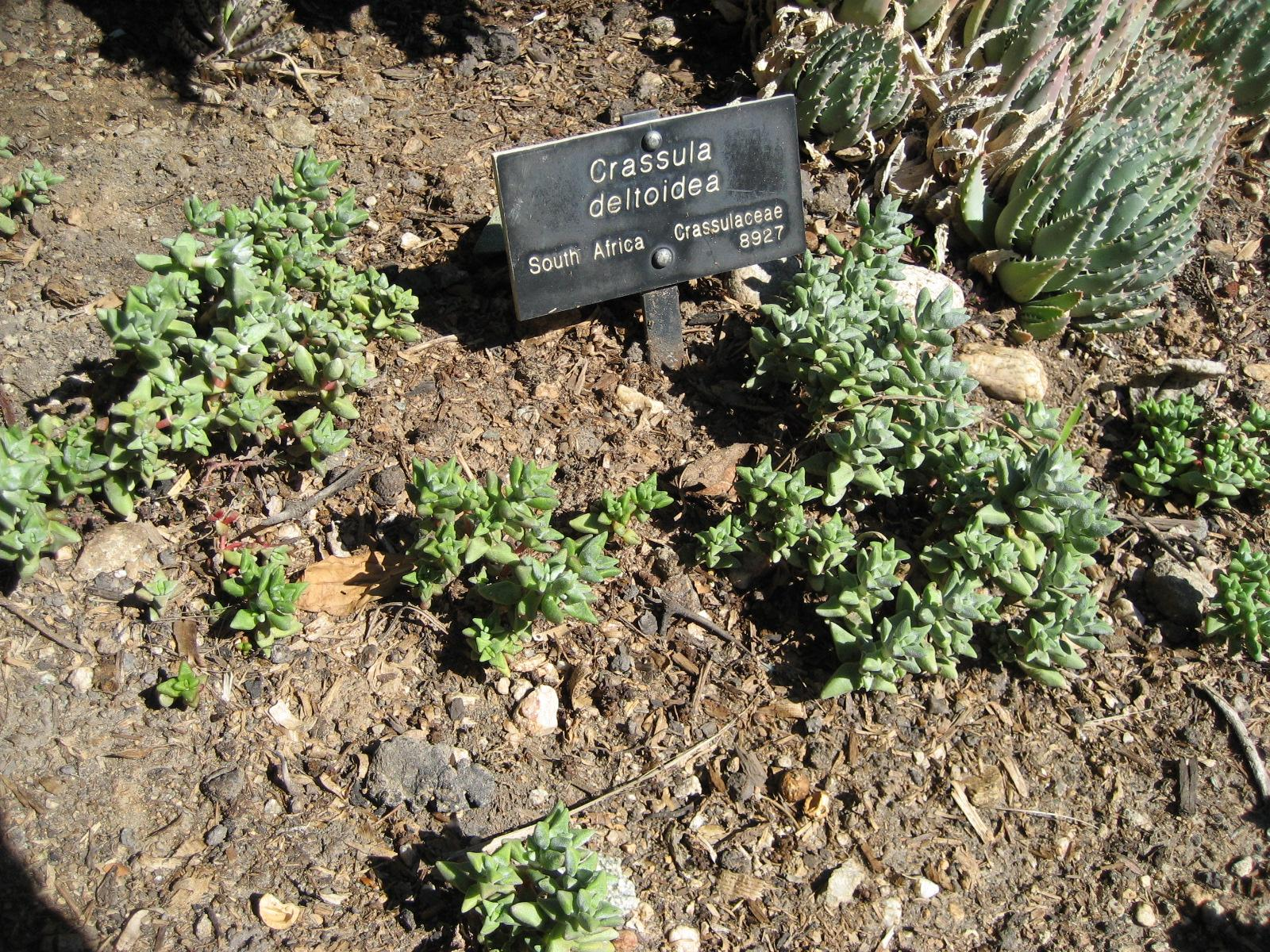
Crassula deltoidea

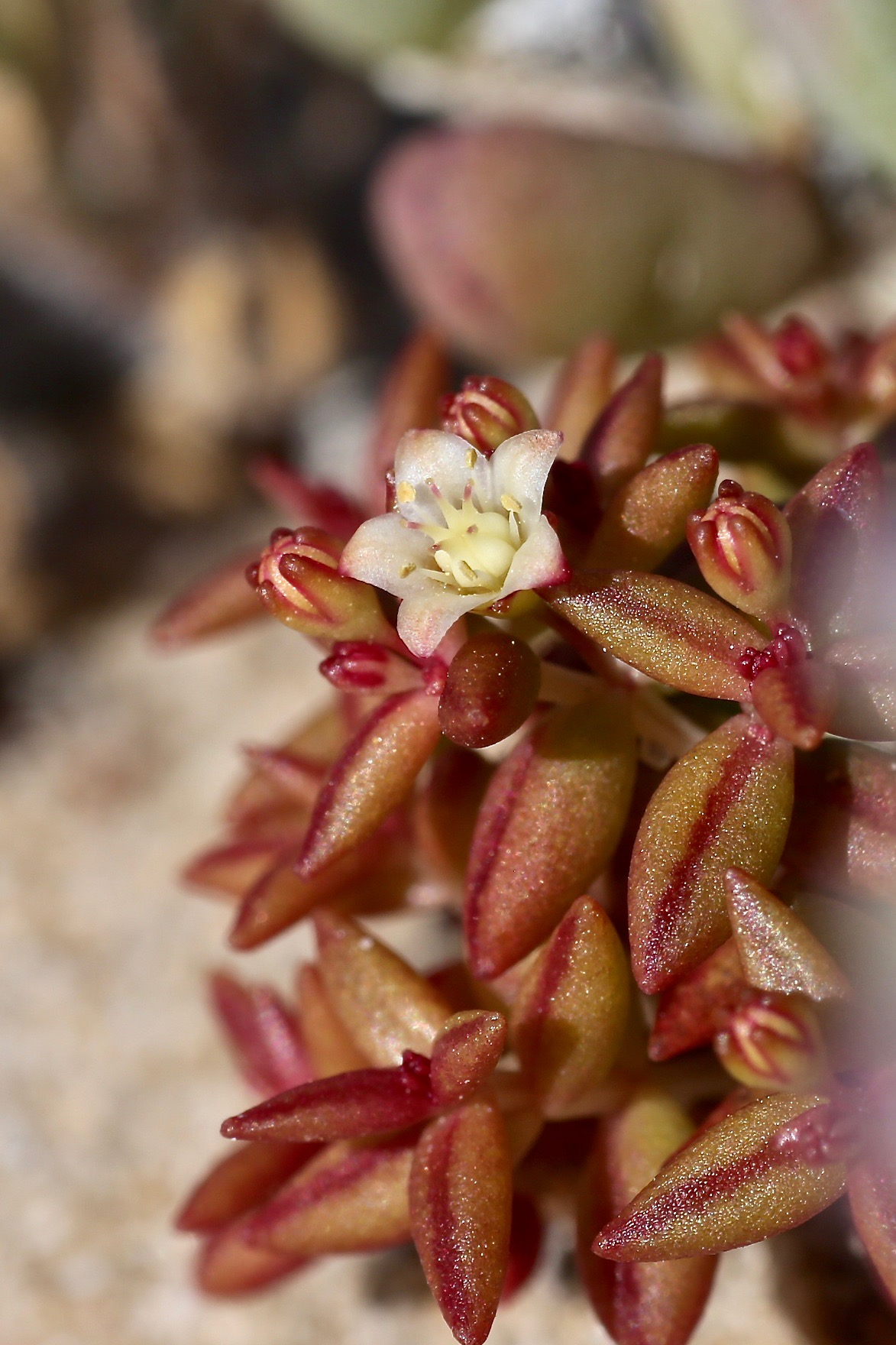
Crassula expansa

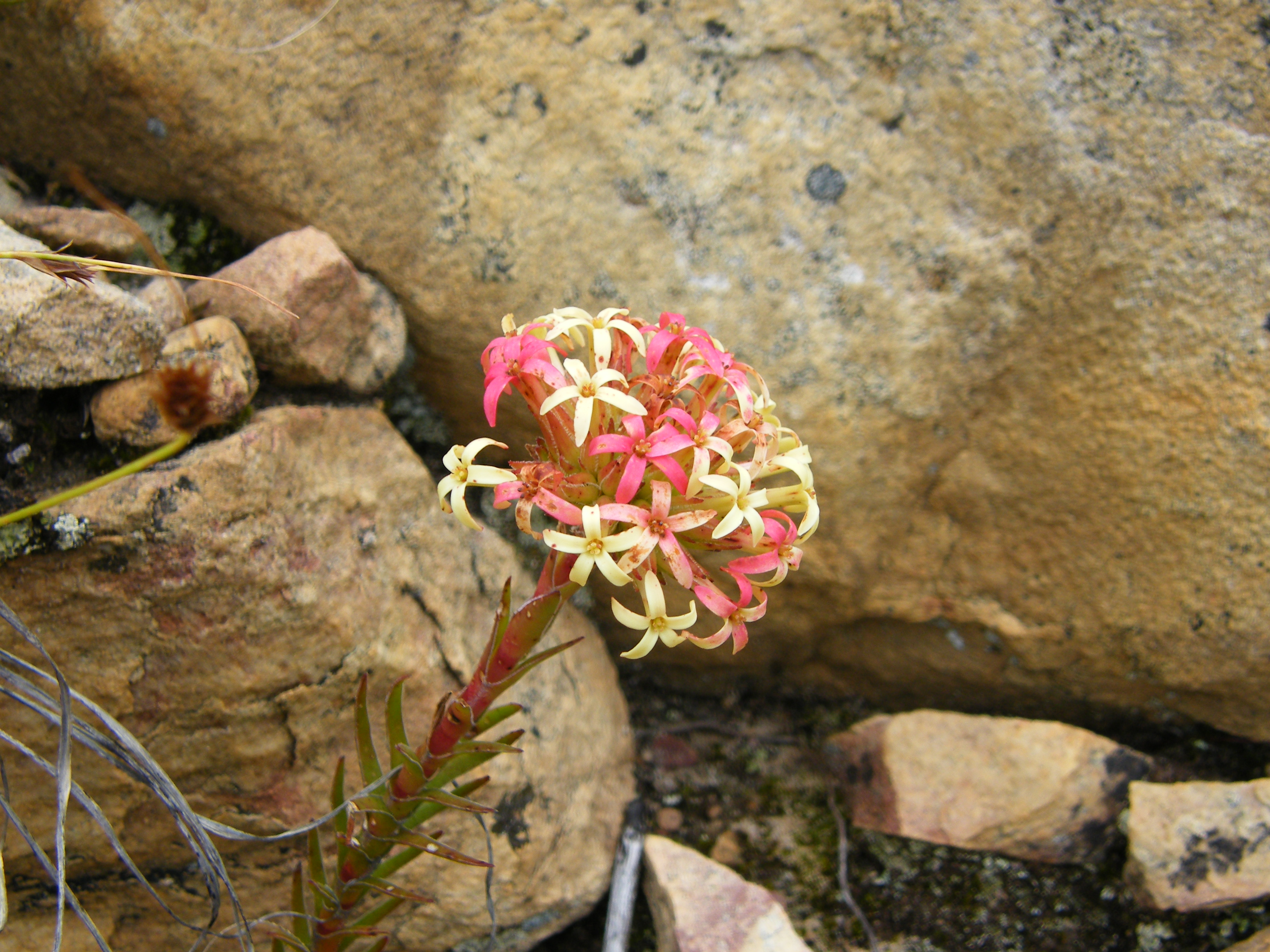
Crassula fascicularis

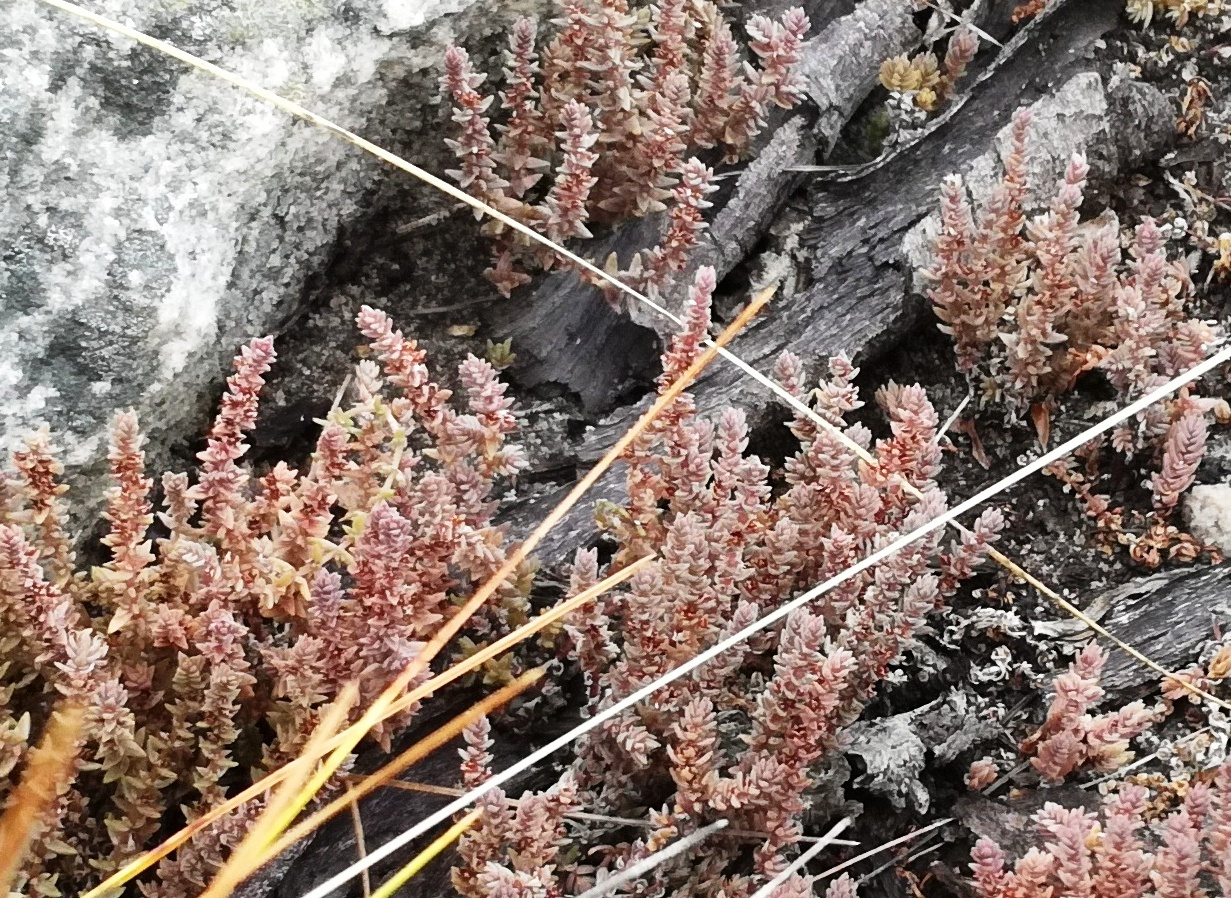
Crassula lanceolata

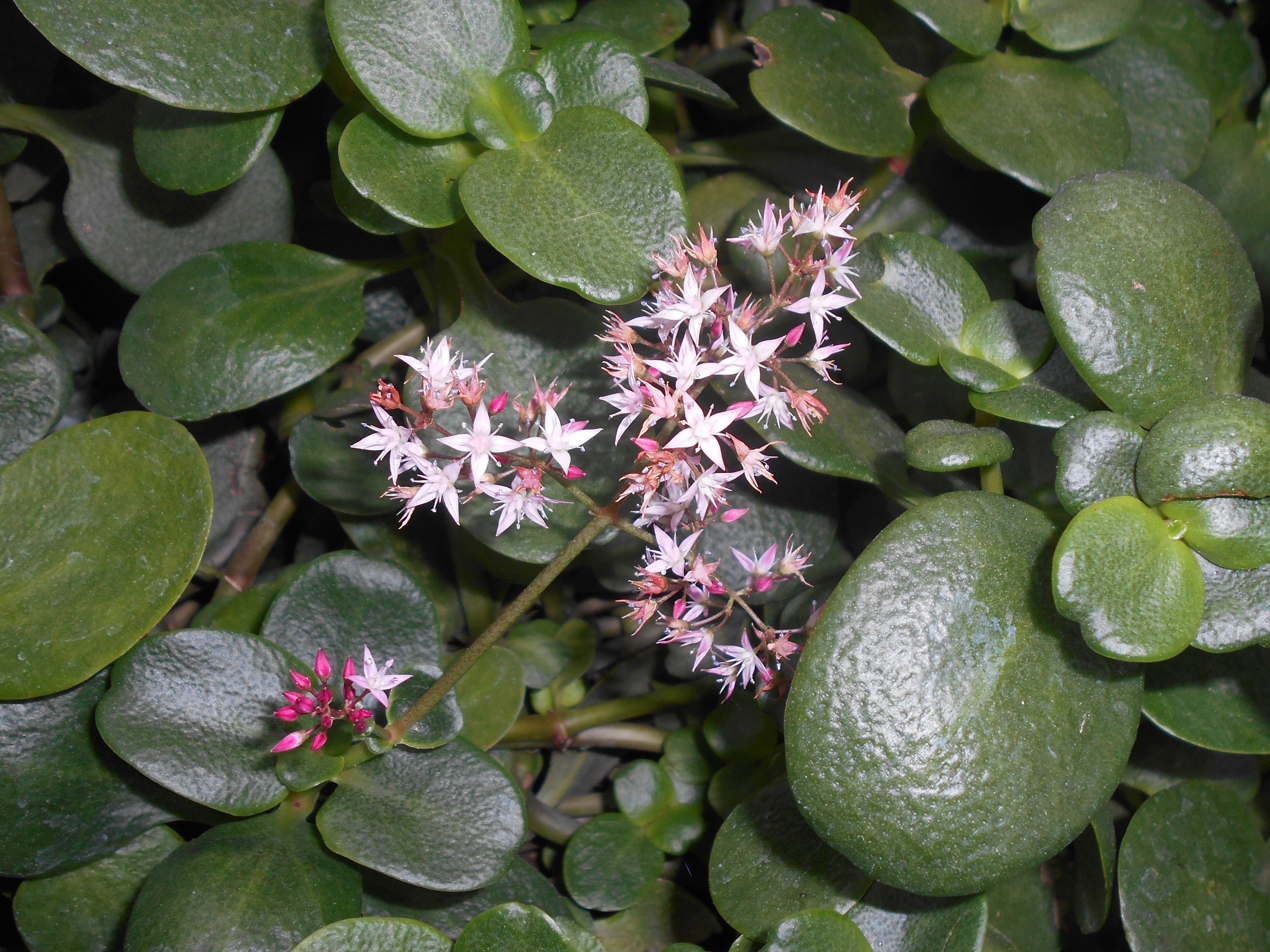
Crassula multicava

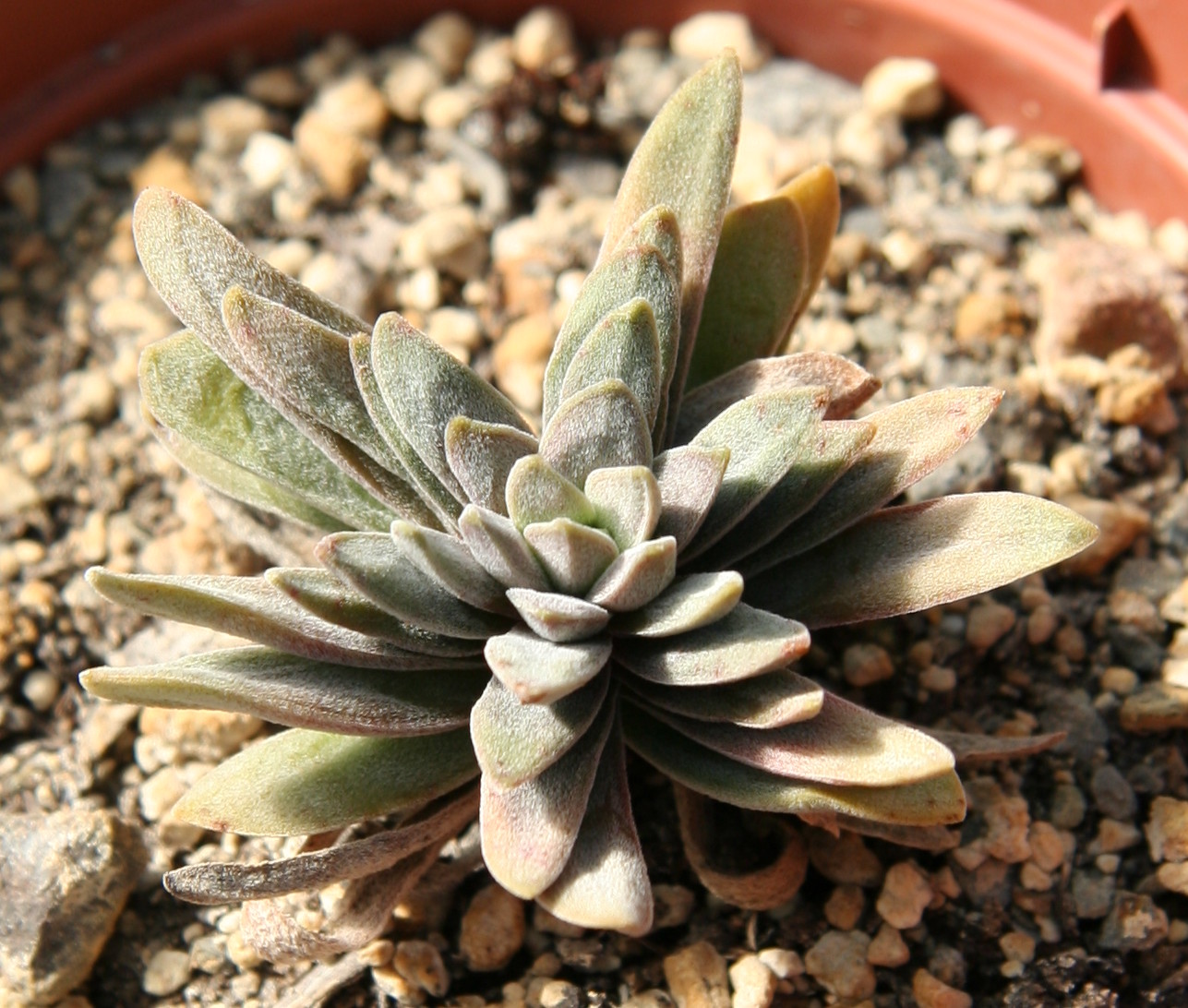
Crassula nudicaulis

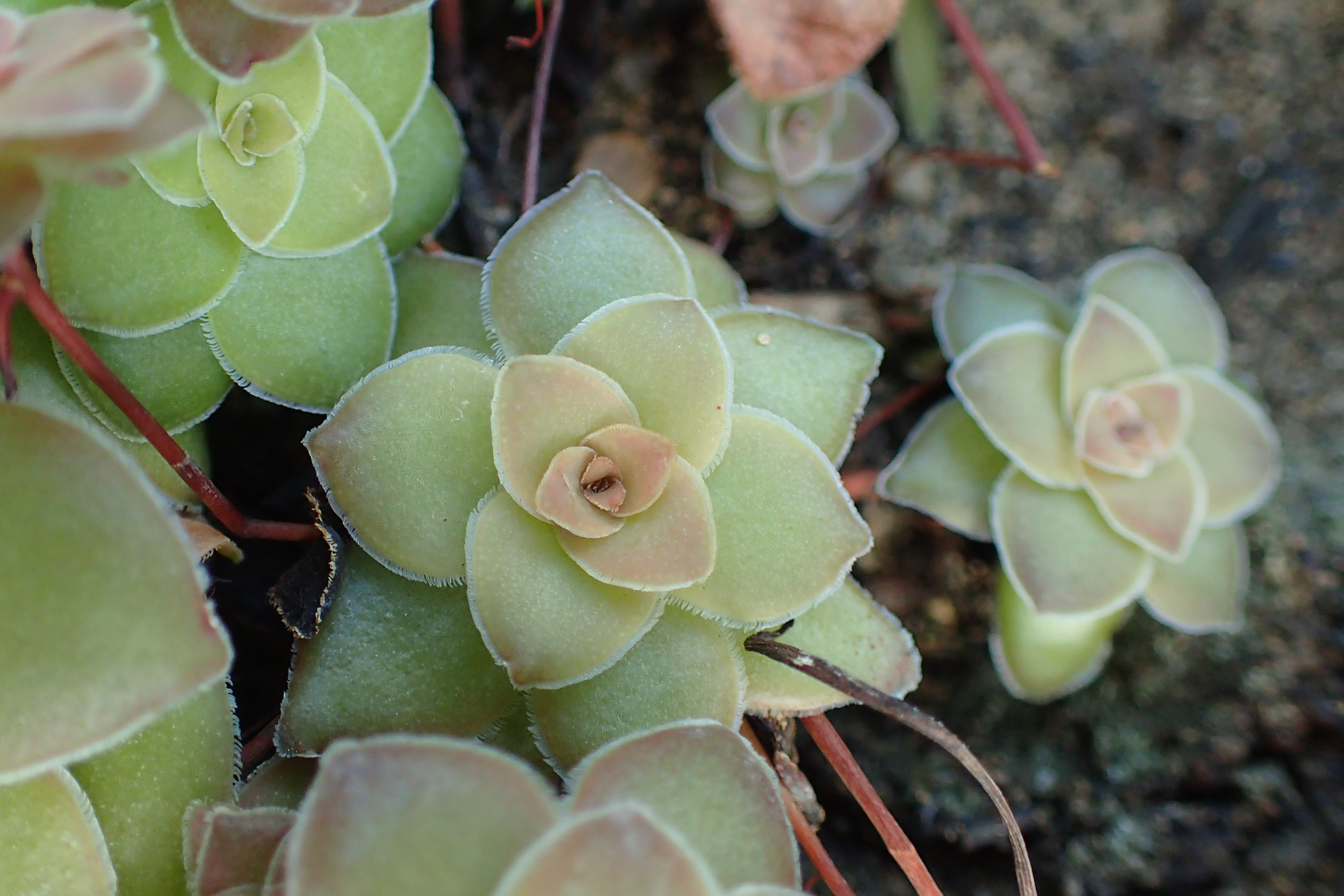
Crassula orbicularis

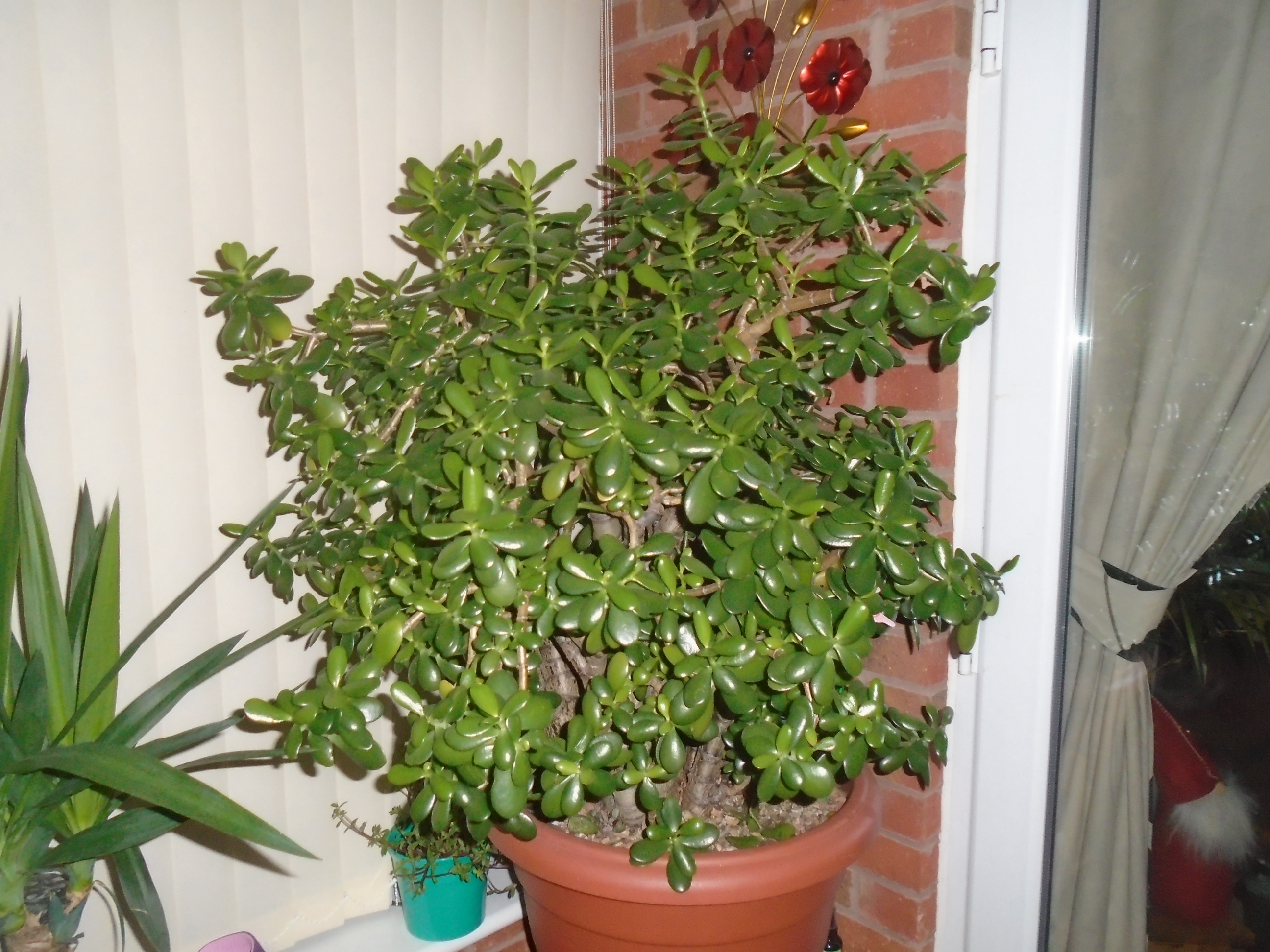
Crassula ovata

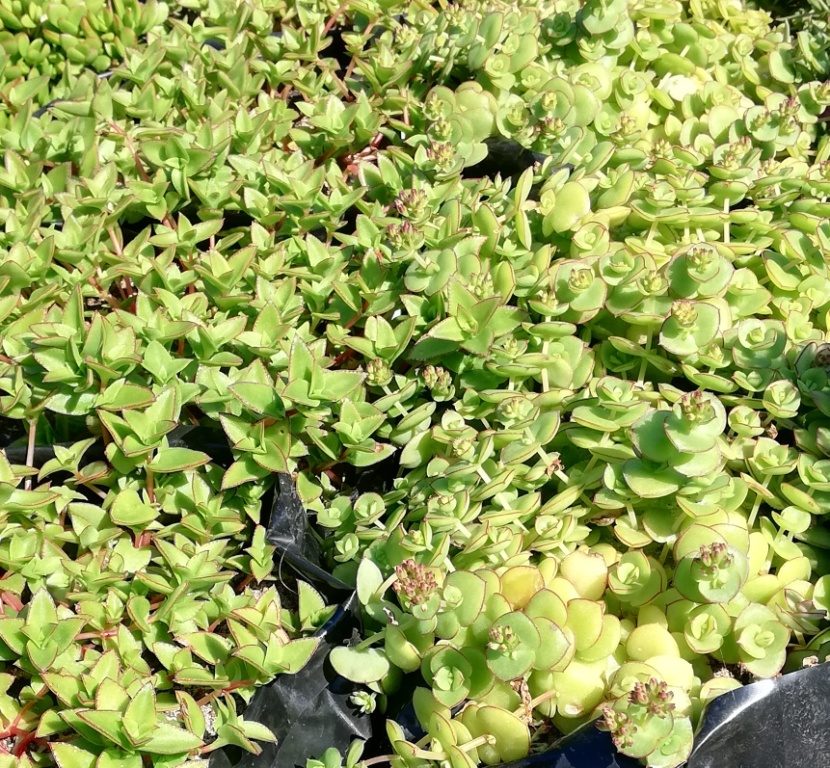
Crassula pellucida

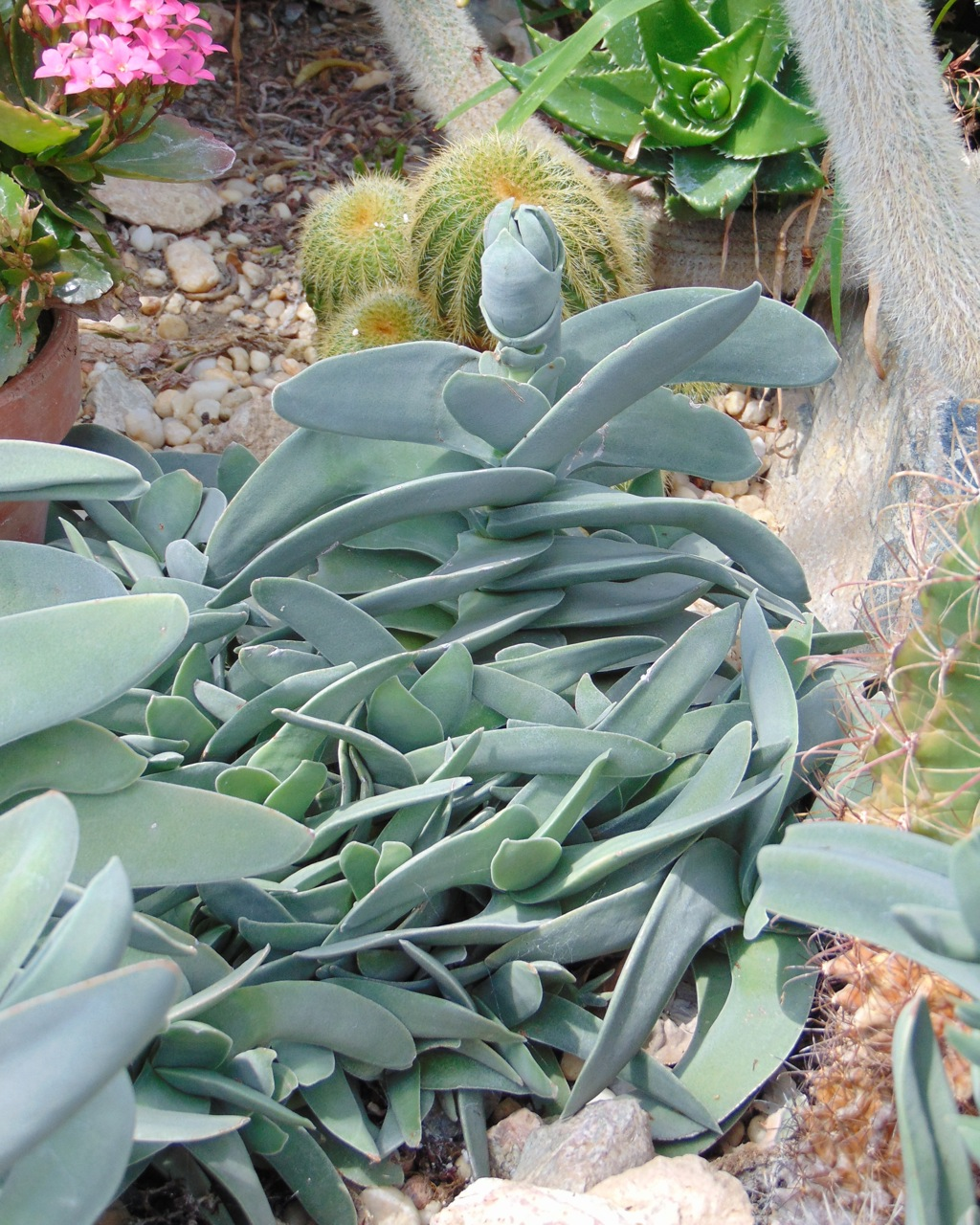
Crassula perfoliata

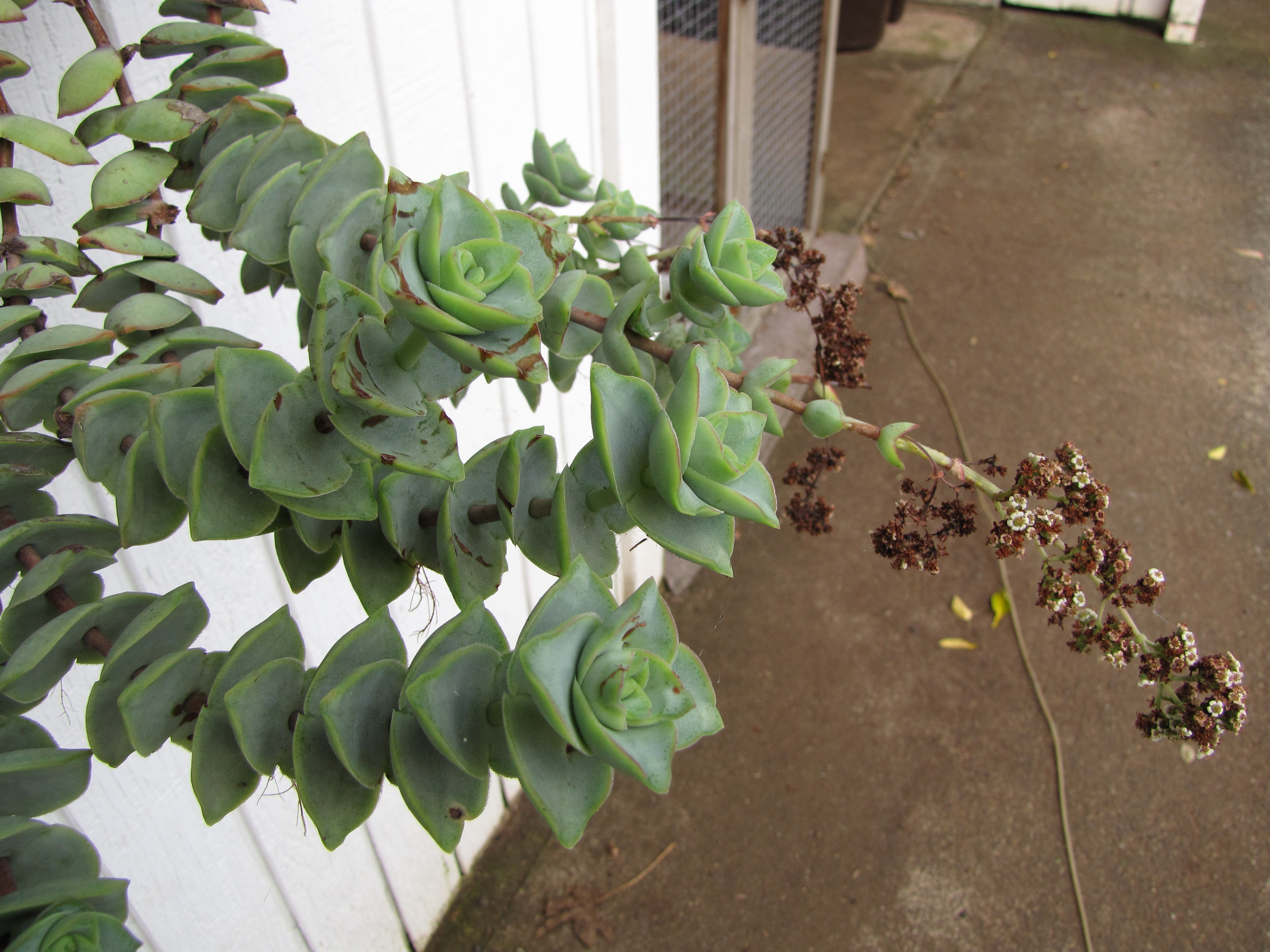
Crassula perforata

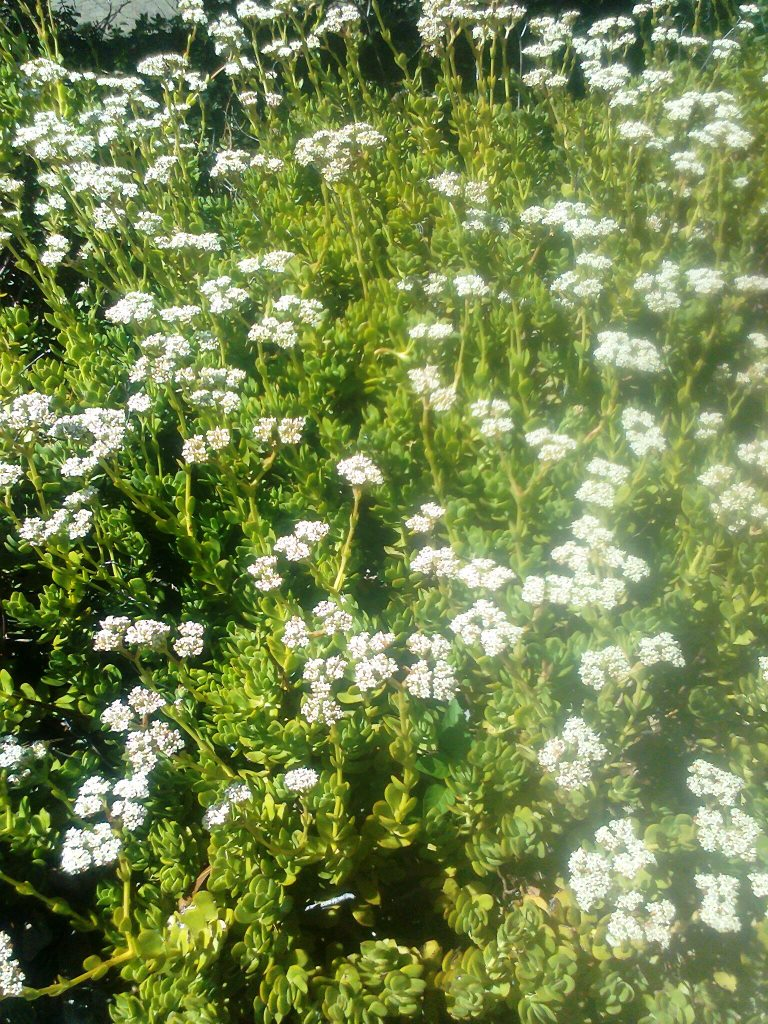
Crassula rubricaulis

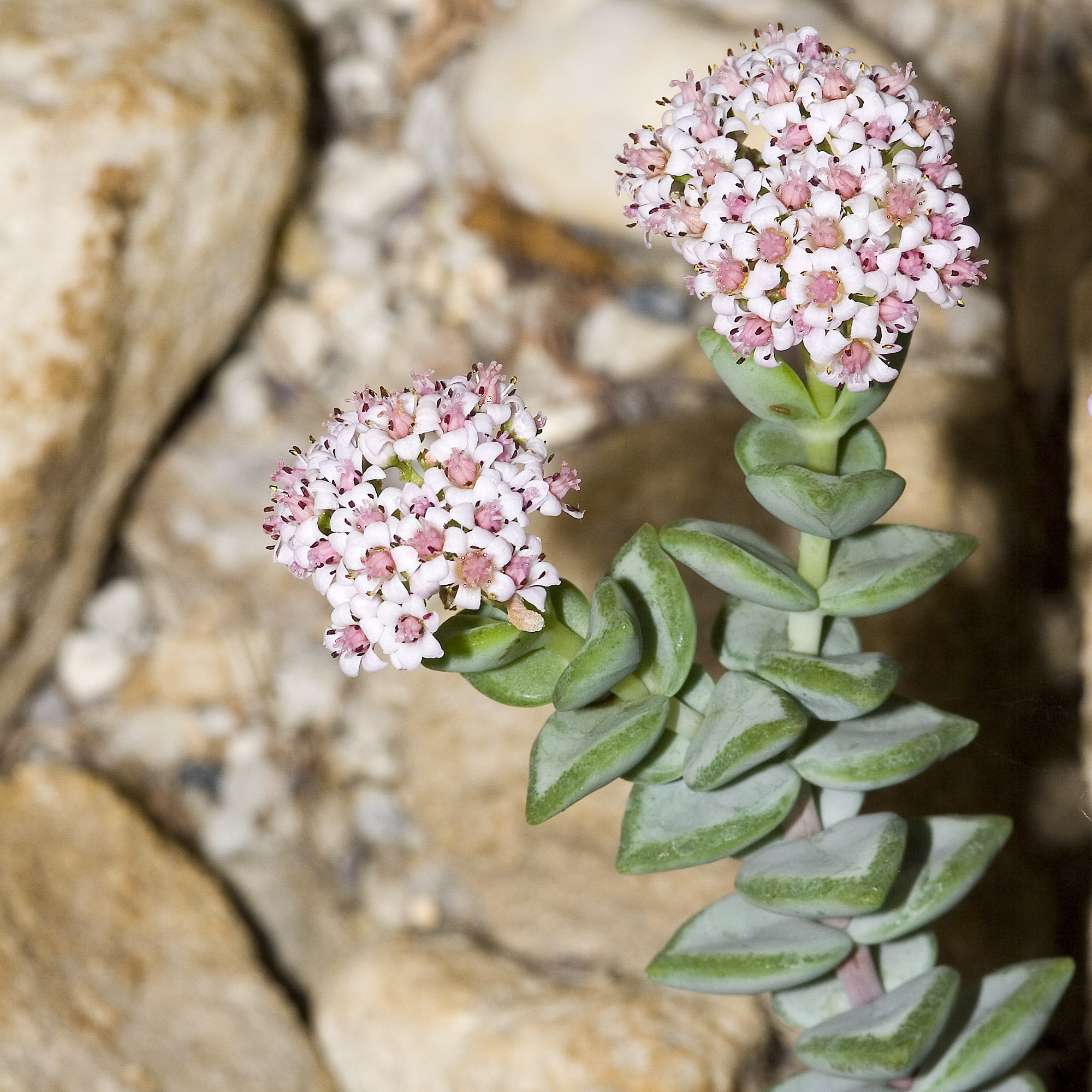
Crassula rupestris

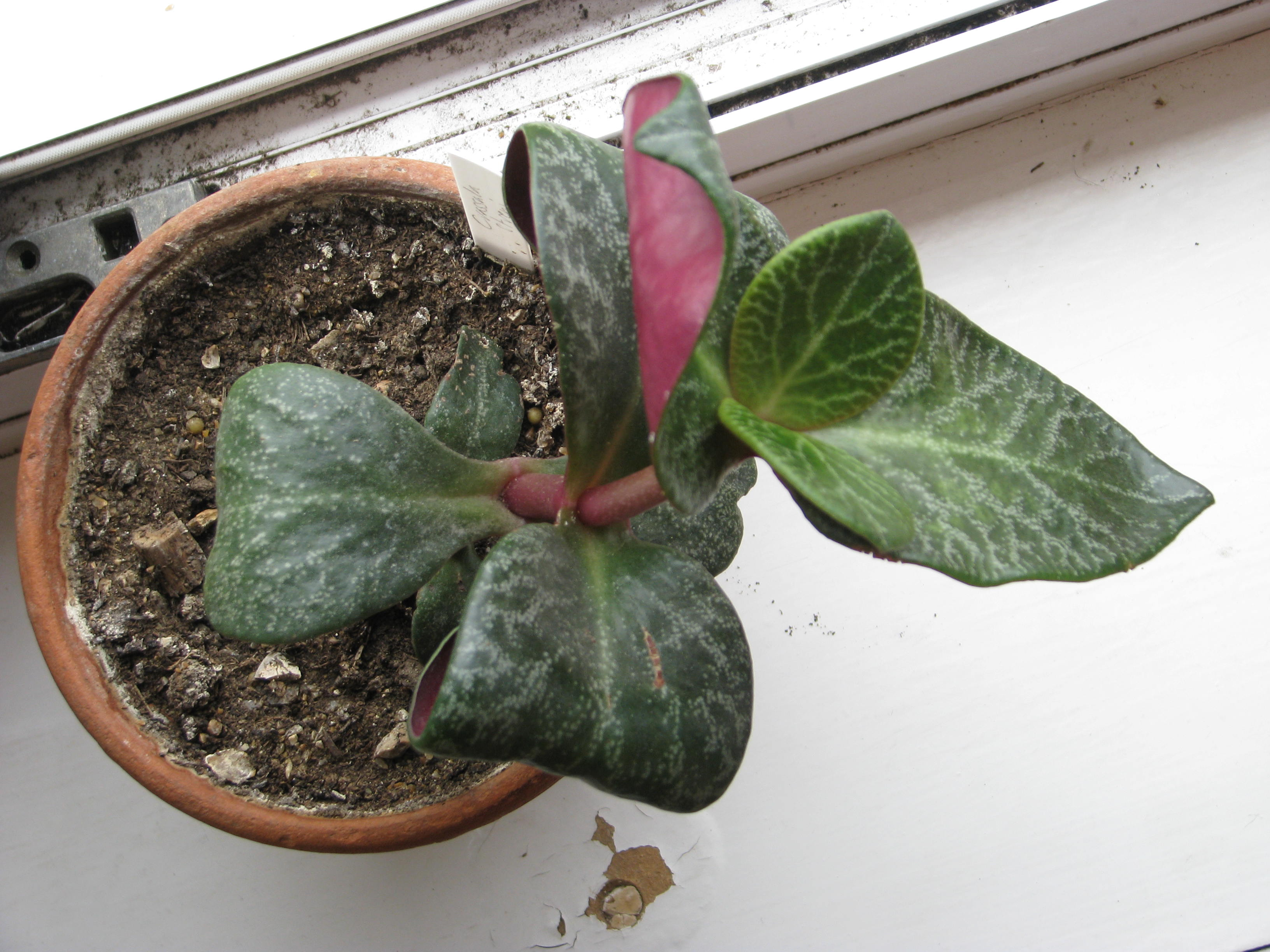
Crassula streyi

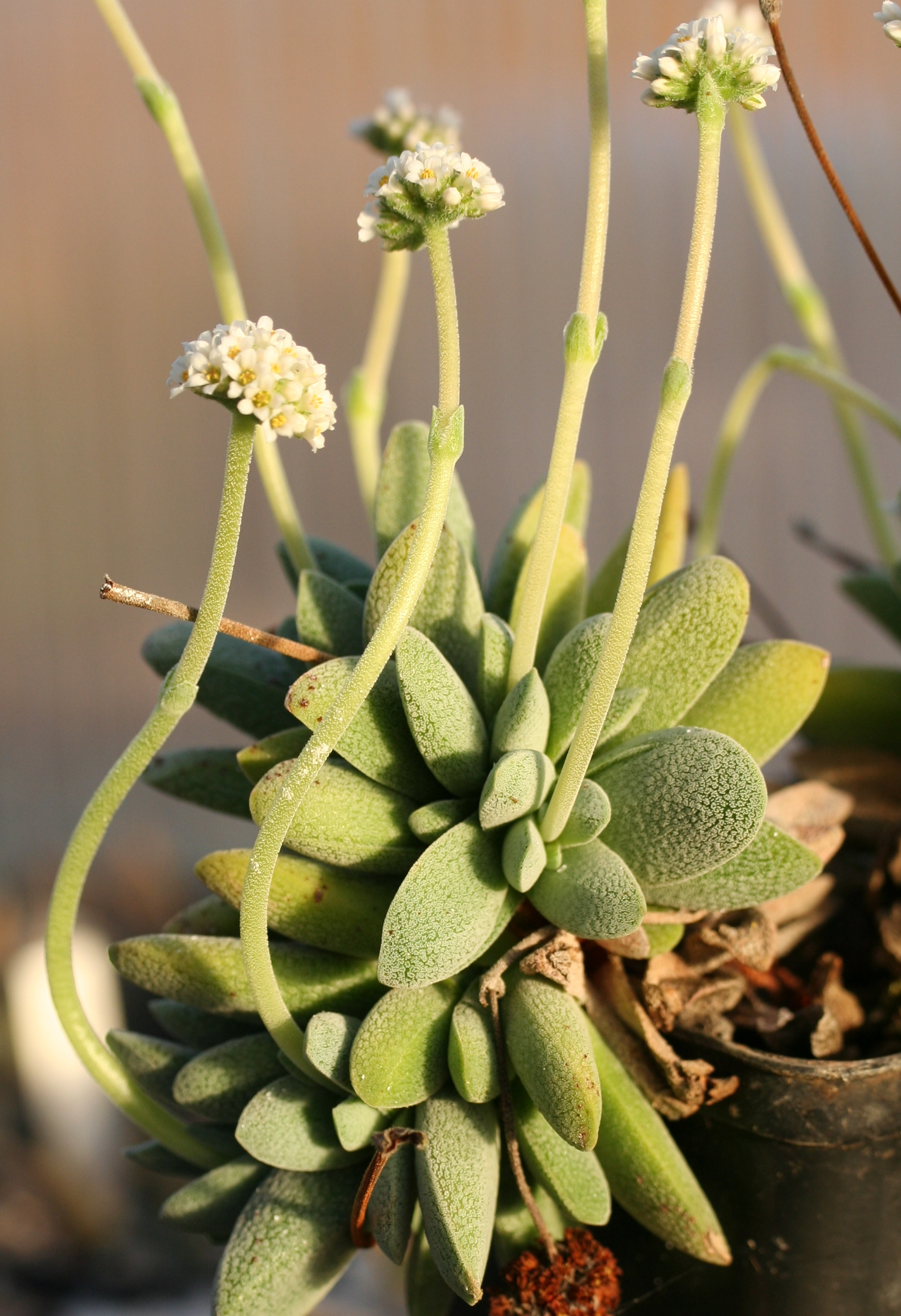
Crassula tecta

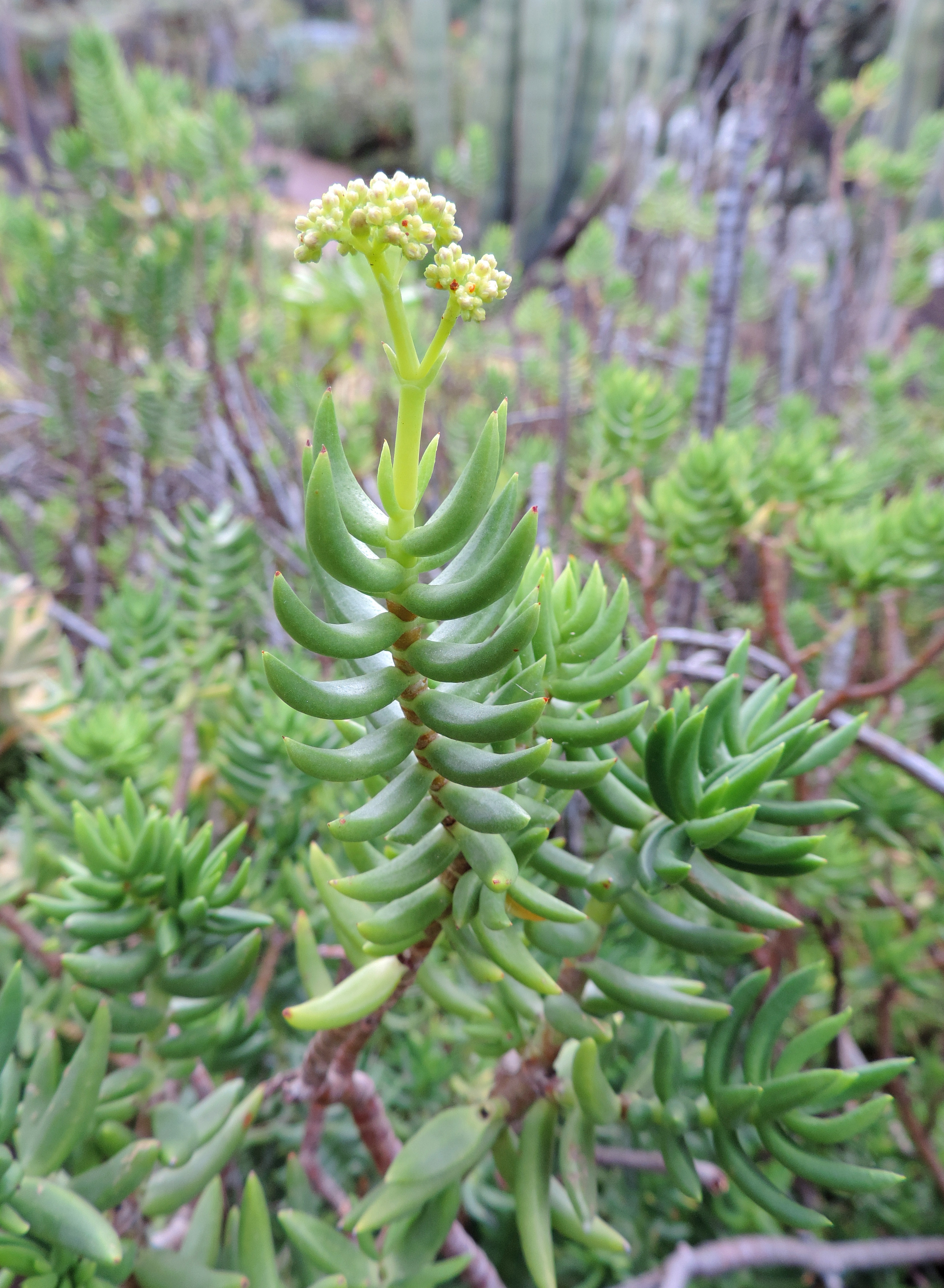
Crassula tetragona

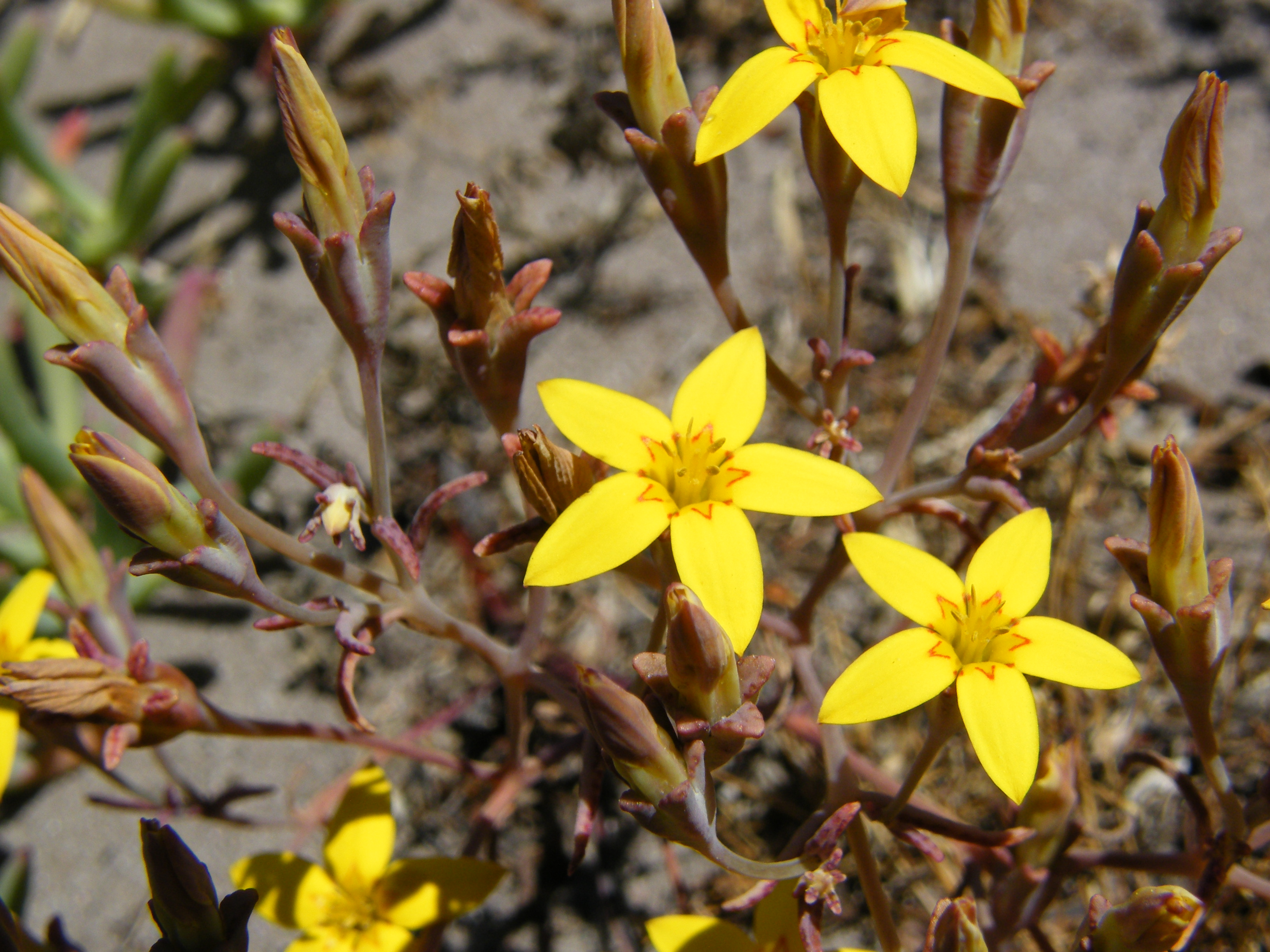
Crassula dichotoma

== Bibliography ==
- Linnaeus, Carl (1753). "Crassula". Species Plantarum: exhibentes plantas rite cognitas, ad genera relatas, cum differentiis specificis, nominibus trivialibus, synonymis selectis, locis natalibus, secundum systema sexuale digestas (in Latin). Vol. 1. Stockholm: Impensis Laurentii Salvii. pp. 282–283., see also Species Plantarum
