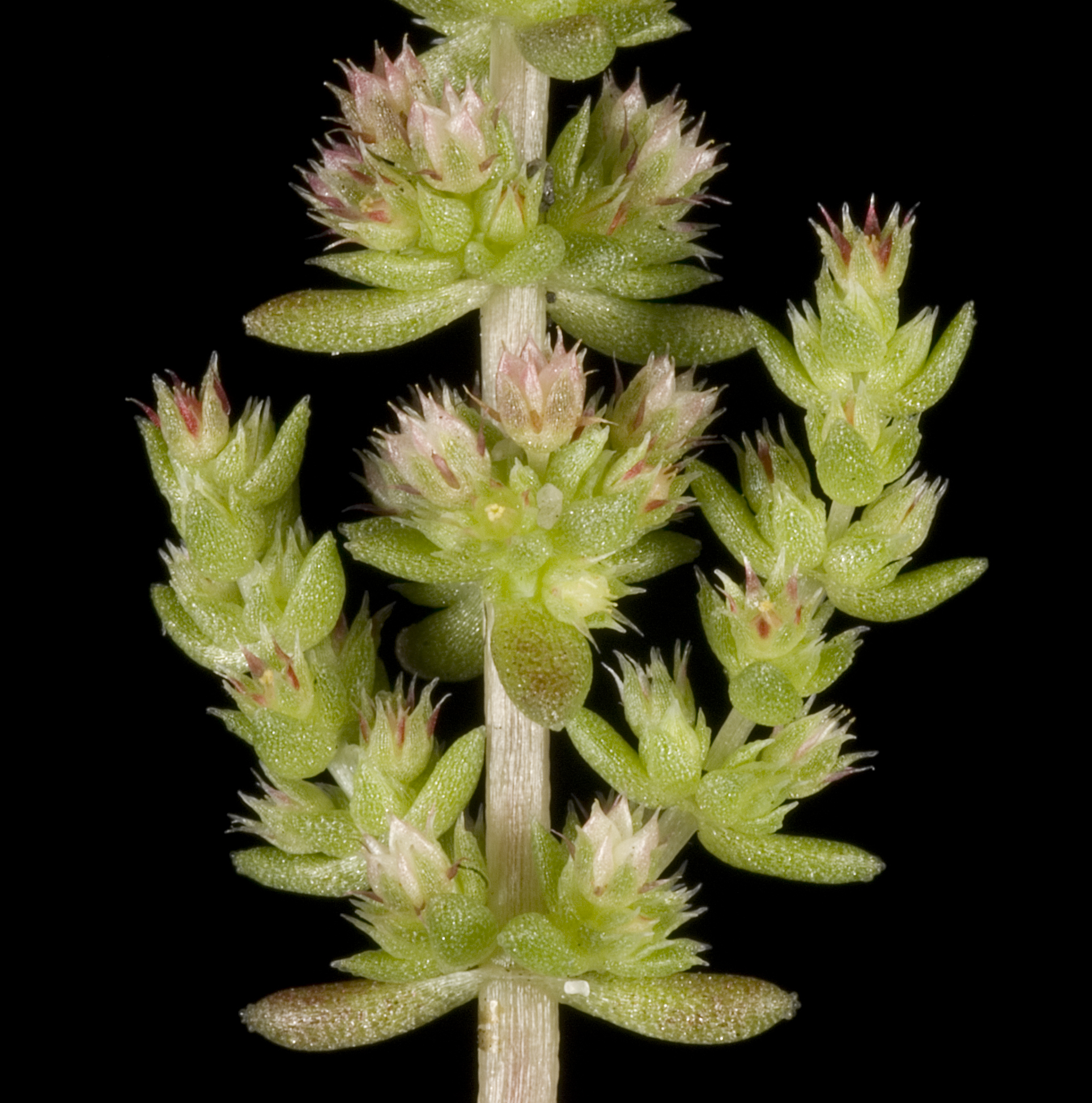

Scientific classification
- Kingdom: Plantae
- Clade: Tracheophytes
- Clade: Angiosperms
- Clade: Eudicots
- Order: Saxifragales
- Family: Crassulaceae
- Genus: Crassula
- Species: C. exserta

Binomial name
- Crassula exserta (Reader) Ostenf.

= Crassula exserta =

Species of succulent

Crassula exserta is a herb in the family Crassulaceae that is native to Western Australia.

The succulent annual herb has an erect to decumbent habit and typically grows to a height of 1 to 15 centimetres (0.4 to 5.9 in). It blooms between August and December producing white-yellow-pink-red-brown flowers.

It is commonly found among granite outcrops, around swamps in depressions and around saline mud flats in the Great Southern, Wheatbelt, Mid West and Goldfields-Esperance regions.
