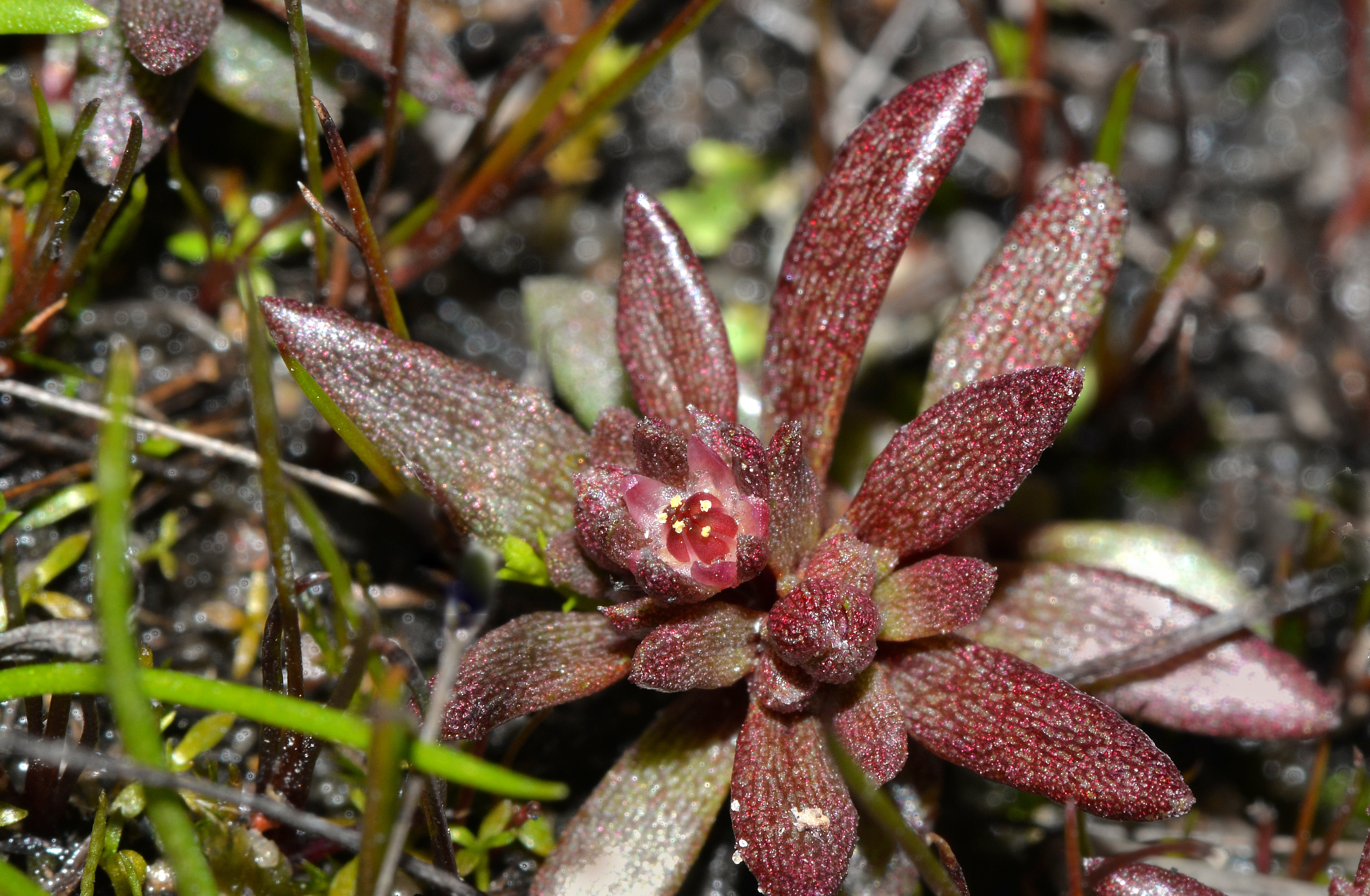

Scientific classification
- Kingdom: Plantae
- Clade: Tracheophytes
- Clade: Angiosperms
- Clade: Eudicots
- Order: Saxifragales
- Family: Crassulaceae
- Genus: Crassula
- Species: C. closiana

Binomial name
- Crassula closiana (Gay) Reiche

= Crassula closiana =

Species of succulent

Crassula closiana is a herb in the family Crassulaceae that is native to Mexico, Peru, Bolivia, Chile and Western Australia.

The succulent annual herb has an erect habit and typically grows to a height of 1 to 10 centimetres (0.4 to 3.9 in). It produces white-cream flowers in the spring time between September and October.

In Australia, the plant is commonly found on granite slopes, sand dunes and in winter wet areas in the South West, Great Southern, Peel and Wheatbelt regions.

In Chile, the species is distributed between the Atacama and O'Higgins regions.
