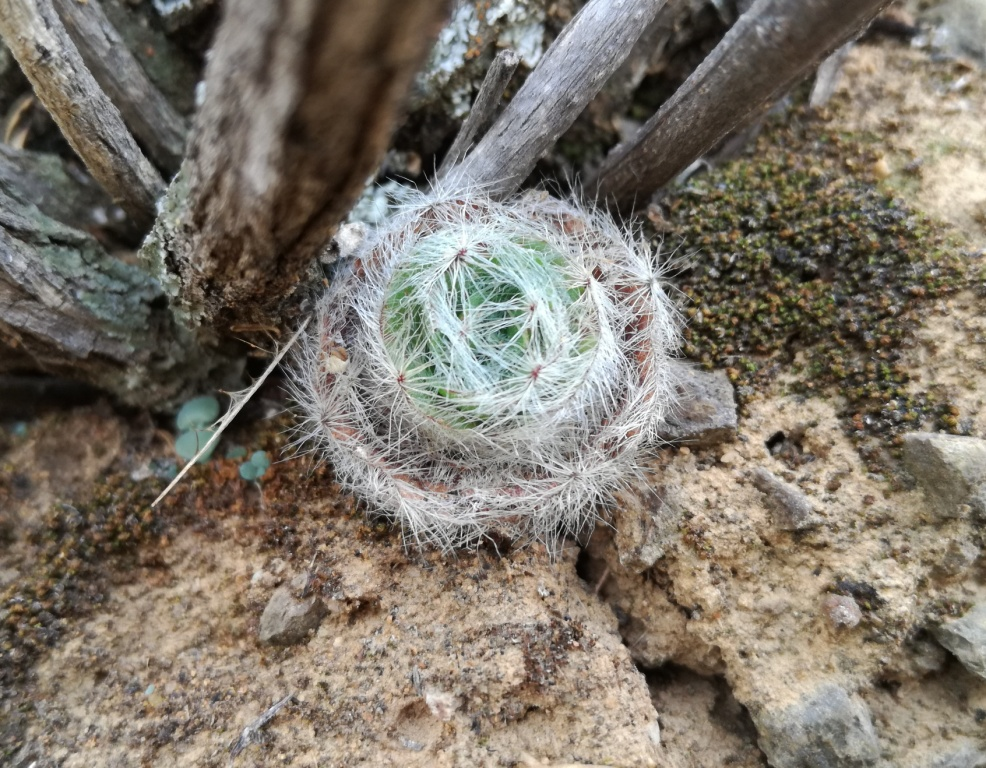
- Crassula barbata in Karoo, South Africa

Scientific classification
- Kingdom: Plantae
- Clade: Tracheophytes
- Clade: Angiosperms
- Clade: Eudicots
- Order: Saxifragales
- Family: Crassulaceae
- Genus: Crassula
- Species: C. barbata

Binomial name
- Crassula barbata Thunb.

= Crassula barbata =

Species of succulent

Crassula barbata, also known as the bearded-leaved crassula, is a species of flowering plant in the genus Crassula endemic to the Cape Provinces of South Africa. Crassula barbata subsp. broomii is a subspecies, also found in South Africa.
