= Crassula thunbergiana =

Scientific classification
- Kingdom: Plantae
- Clade: Tracheophytes
- Clade: Angiosperms
- Clade: Eudicots
- Order: Saxifragales
- Family: Crassulaceae
- Genus: Crassula
- Species: C. thunbergiana

Binomial name
- Crassula thunbergiana Schult.

Species of succulent

Crassula thunbergiana is a herb in the family Crassulaceae.

The annual herb typically grows to a height of 10 centimetres (3.9 in). It blooms between September and October producing white flowers.

It not native to Western Australia but is found in disturbed areas in the Great Southern, Wheatbelt, South West and Peel regions.
