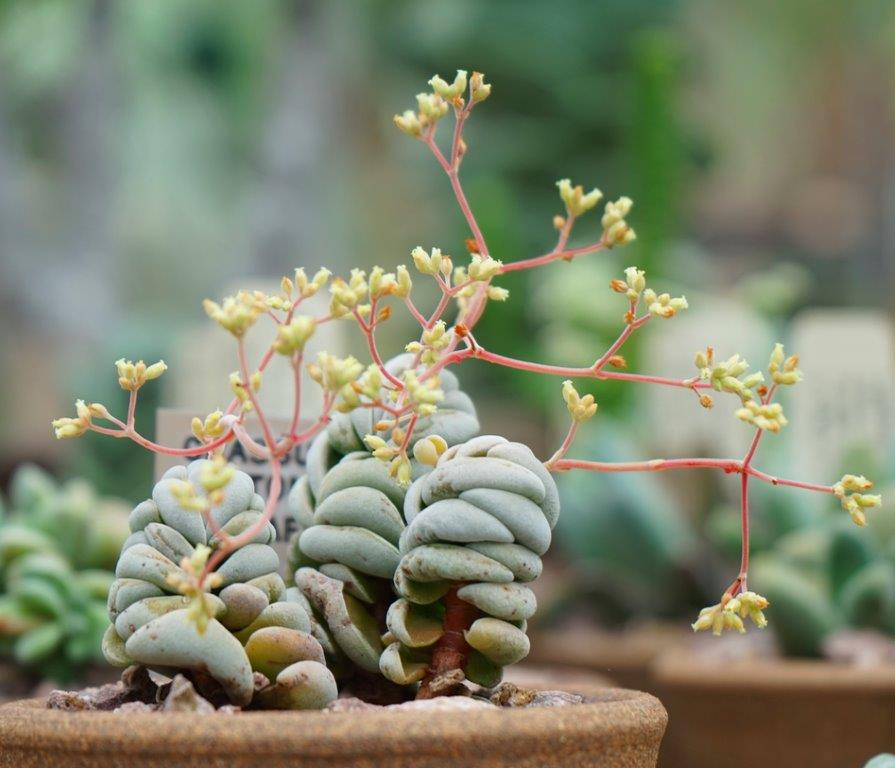

Scientific classification
- Kingdom: Plantae
- Clade: Tracheophytes
- Clade: Angiosperms
- Clade: Eudicots
- Order: Saxifragales
- Family: Crassulaceae
- Genus: Crassula
- Species: C. alstonii

Binomial name
- Crassula alstonii Marloth

= Crassula alstonii =

Species of succulent

Crassula alstonii is a species of succulent plant in the family 'Crassulaceae. It is endemic to the Cape Provinces of South Africa. The species is in USDA hardiness zone 10a-11.

== Growing ==
Like some other plants of the genus, Crassula alstonii is easy to grow and needs below average to average water. They need light shade and need 6.1-7.8pH soil. They can be easily propagated from a single leaf, along with offsets.
