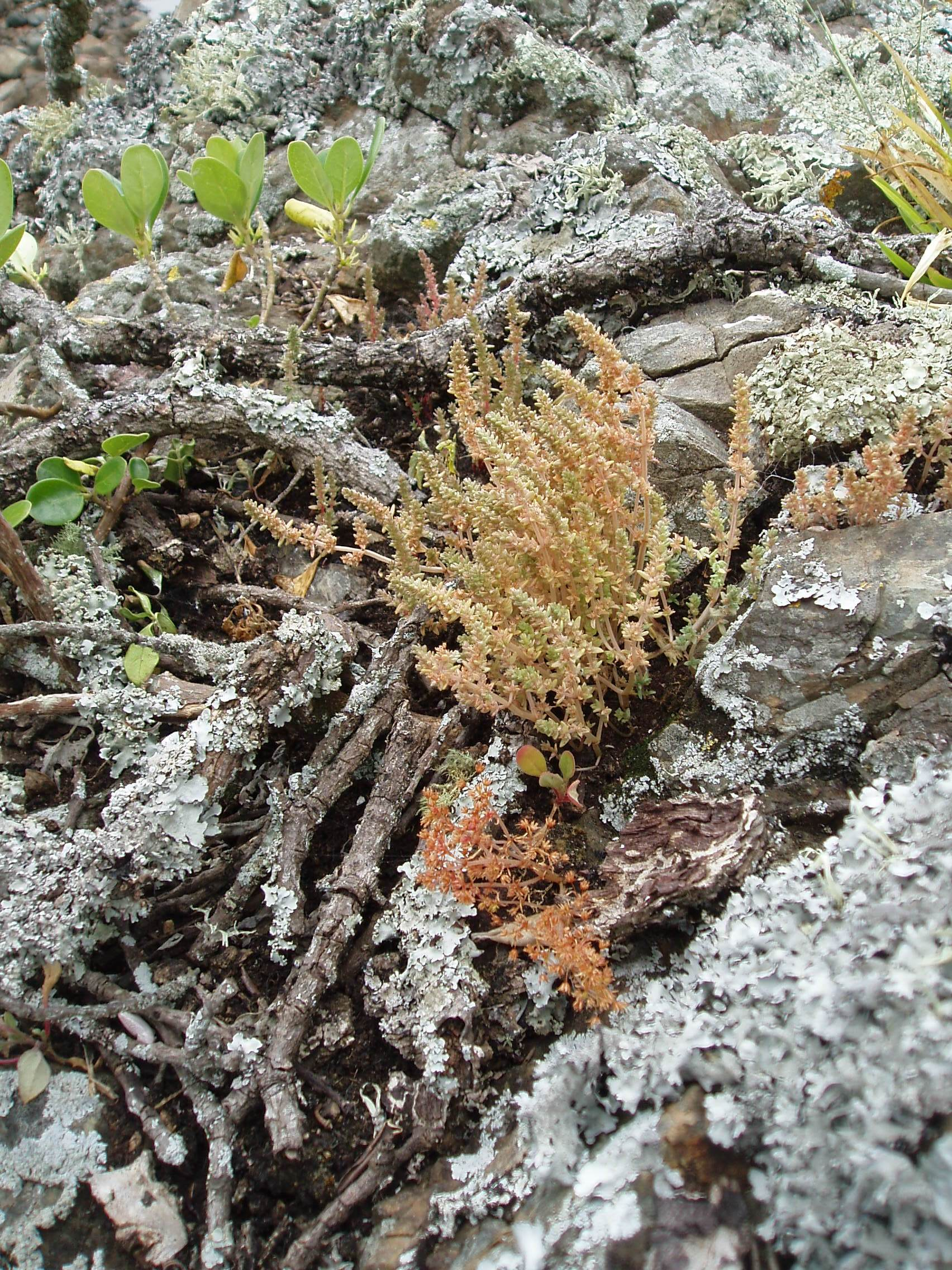
- Crassula colligata

Scientific classification
- Kingdom: Plantae
- Clade: Tracheophytes
- Clade: Angiosperms
- Clade: Eudicots
- Order: Saxifragales
- Family: Crassulaceae
- Genus: Crassula
- Species: C. colligata

Binomial name
- Crassula colligata Toelken

= Crassula colligata =

Species of succulent

Crassula colligata is a herb in the family Crassulaceae that is native to southern Australia and New Zealand.

There are two recognised subspecies: Crassula colligata subsp. colligata. and Crassula colligata subsp. lamprosperma.

The annual herb has an erect habit and typically grows to a height of 16 centimetres (6.3 in). In Western Australia, the species is commonly found on cliffs, scarps, in gullies, behind dunes and near salt lakes along the south coast in the Great Southern, Wheatbelt and Goldfields-Esperance regions.

Crassula colligata subsp. lamprosperma has an introduced range in Southern California, where it was first collected in 2002 in the San Gabriel Valley, at the mouth of San Gabriel Canyon.
