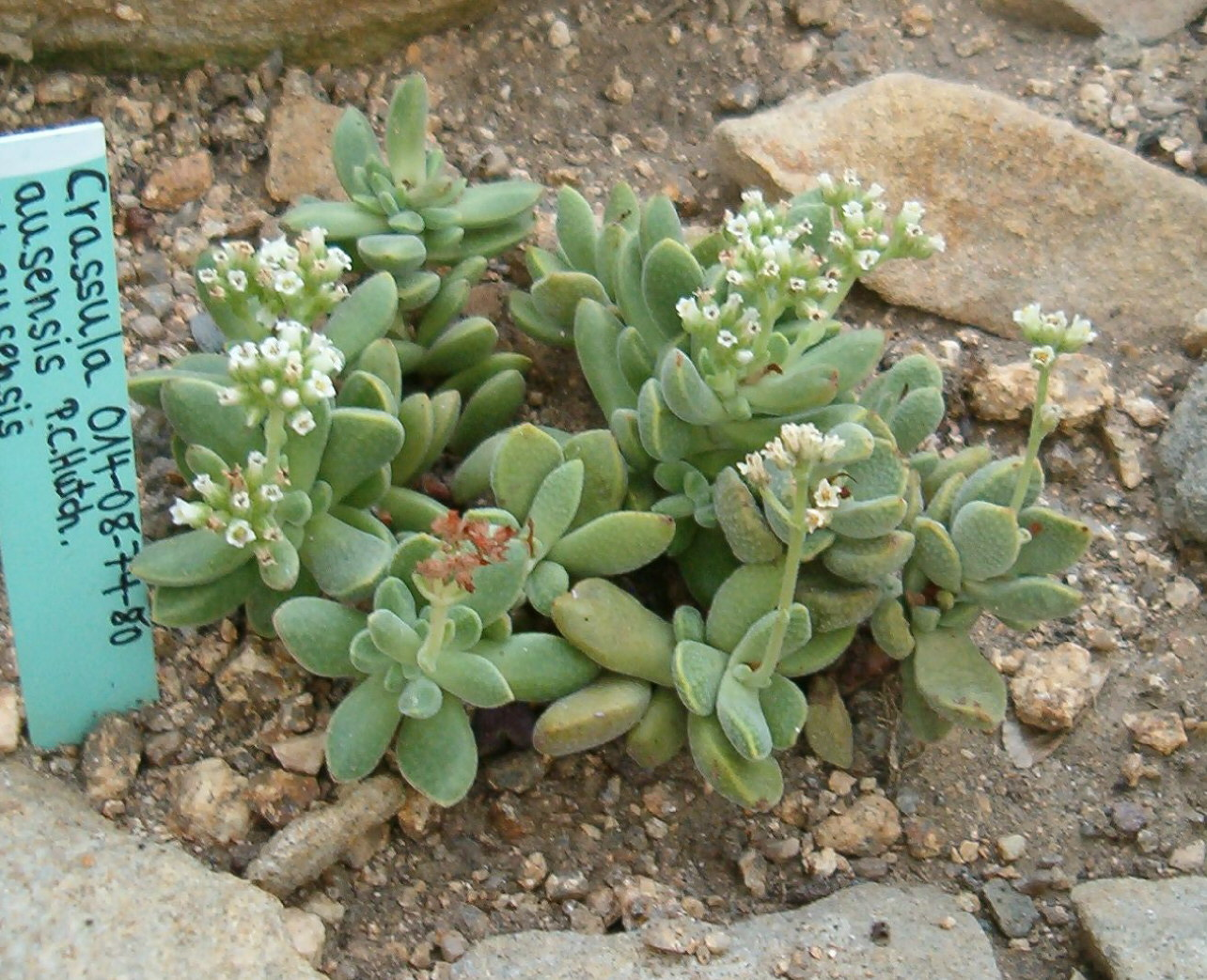
- Crassula ausensis in a botanic garden

Scientific classification
- Kingdom: Plantae
- Clade: Tracheophytes
- Clade: Angiosperms
- Clade: Eudicots
- Order: Saxifragales
- Family: Crassulaceae
- Genus: Crassula
- Species: C. ausensis

Binomial name
- Crassula ausensis Hutchison

= Crassula ausensis =

Species of succulent

Crassula ausensis is a species of succulent in the genus Crassula found in Namibia. Crassula ausensis subsp. giessii and Crassula ausensis subsp. titanopsis are varieties of the species.

== Description ==
These plants can grow around 35 mm (1 3/8 in) and have a flower stalk of 80 mm (3 1/4 in). The leaves have pink, turquoise and brown markings and generally are considered one of the more beautiful Crassula. It blooms in late fall with white flowers.

== Crassula ausensis subsp. titanopsis ==
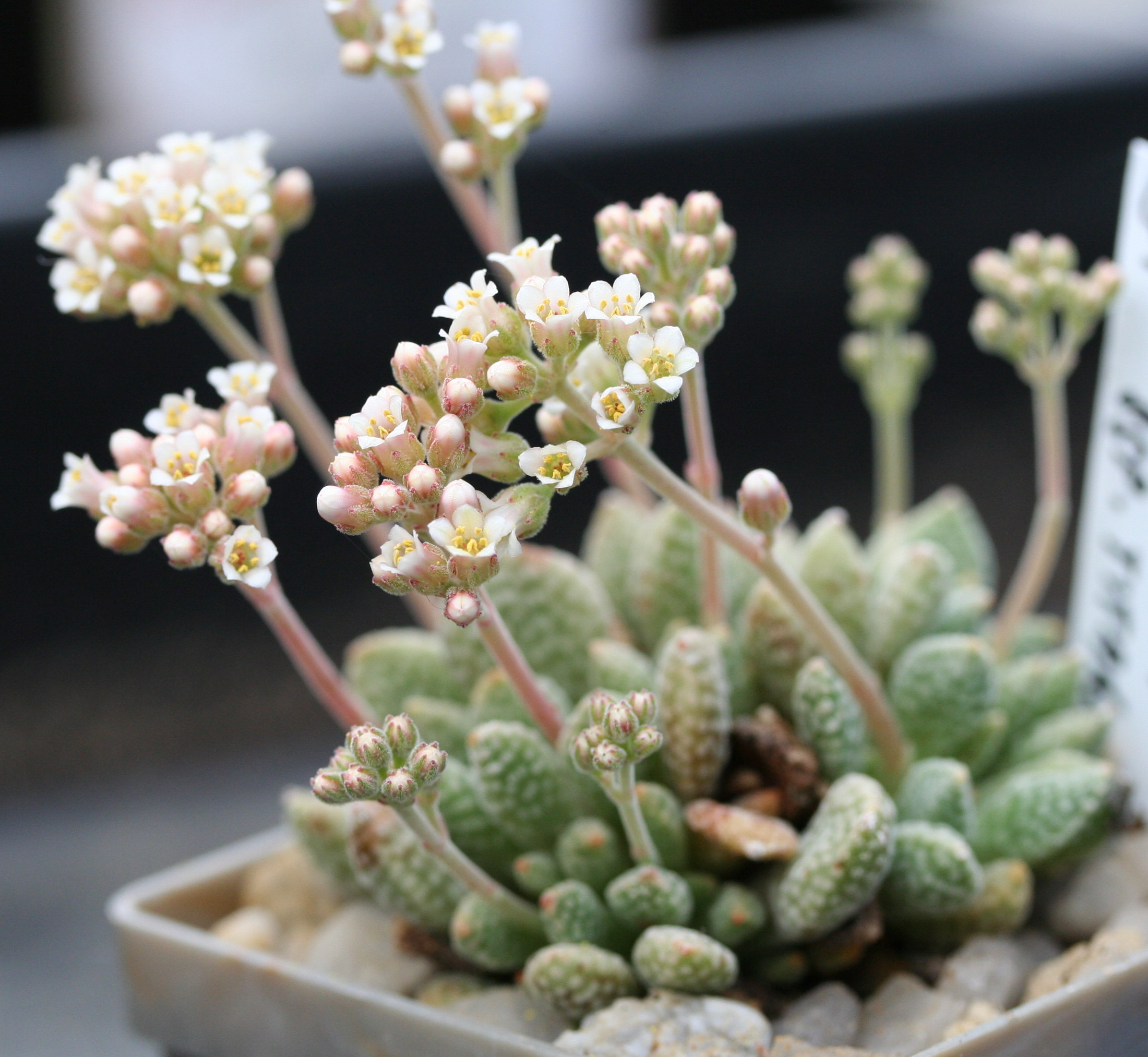
Crassula ausensis subsp. titanopsis.

Crassula ausensis subsp. titanopsis is a variety of the species found in southwest Namibia. It usually smaller than Crassula ausensis, being around 100 mm (4 in) across. It blooms small white flowers in late fall to early winter.
