= Crassula tetramera =

Scientific classification
- Kingdom: Plantae
- Clade: Tracheophytes
- Clade: Angiosperms
- Clade: Eudicots
- Order: Saxifragales
- Family: Crassulaceae
- Genus: Crassula
- Species: C. tetramera

Binomial name
- Crassula tetramera (Toelken) A.Druce & Sykes

Species of succulent

Crassula tetramera is a herb in the family Crassulaceae.

The annual herb has an erect habit and typically grows to a height of 10 centimetres (3.9 in).

It is found on upper slopes and summits in the Great Southern, Wheatbelt and Goldfields-Esperance regions of Western Australia where it grows in stony sandy-loam soils over quartzite or granite.
