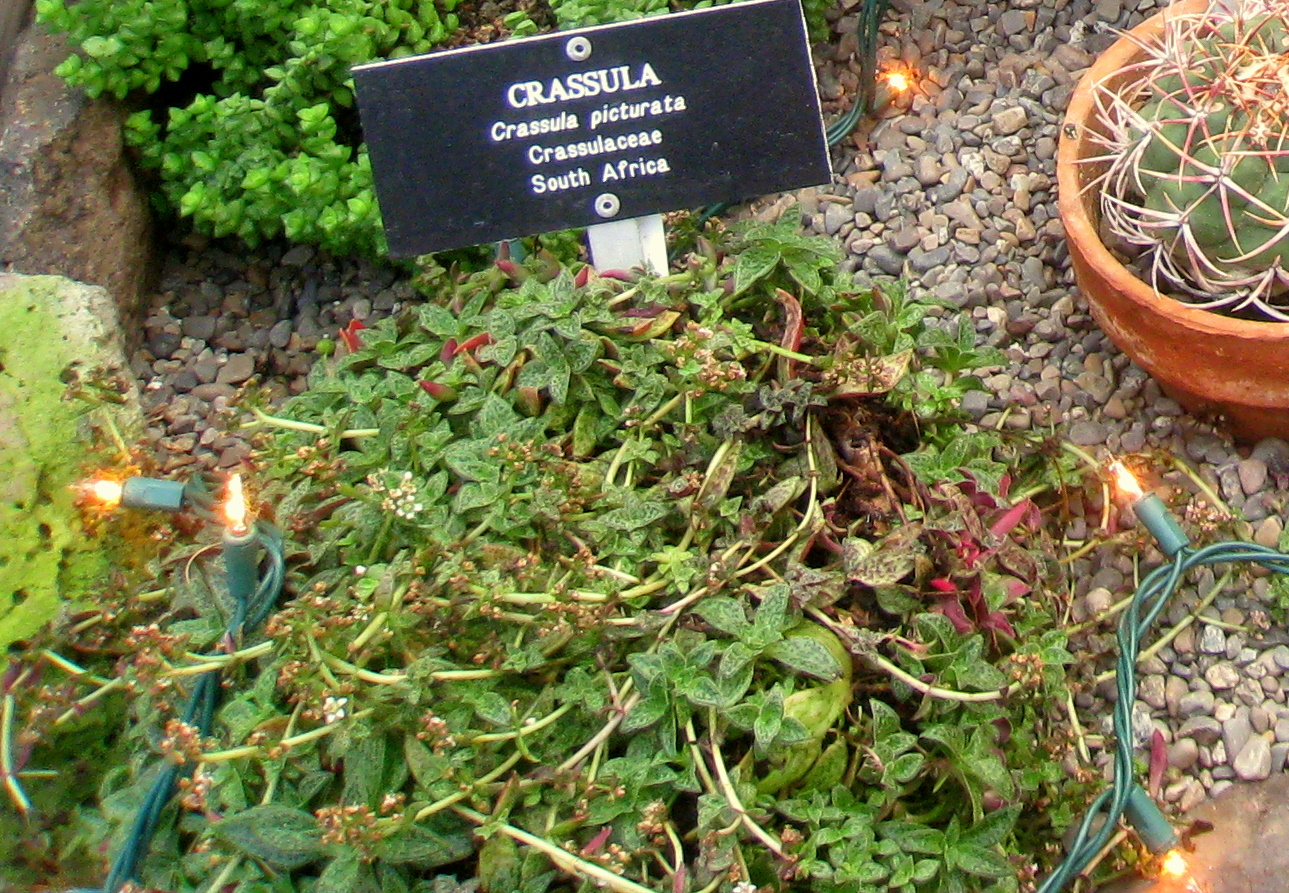

Scientific classification
- Kingdom: Plantae
- Clade: Tracheophytes
- Clade: Angiosperms
- Clade: Eudicots
- Order: Saxifragales
- Family: Crassulaceae
- Genus: Crassula
- Species: C. picturata

Binomial name
- Crassula picturata Boom

= Crassula picturata =

Species of succulent

Crassula picturata is a species of plant in the family Crassulaceae, native to Cape Province in South Africa. It is a stemless plant with triangular, dark green leaves measuring approximately 10–12 cm long by 1 cm wide.
