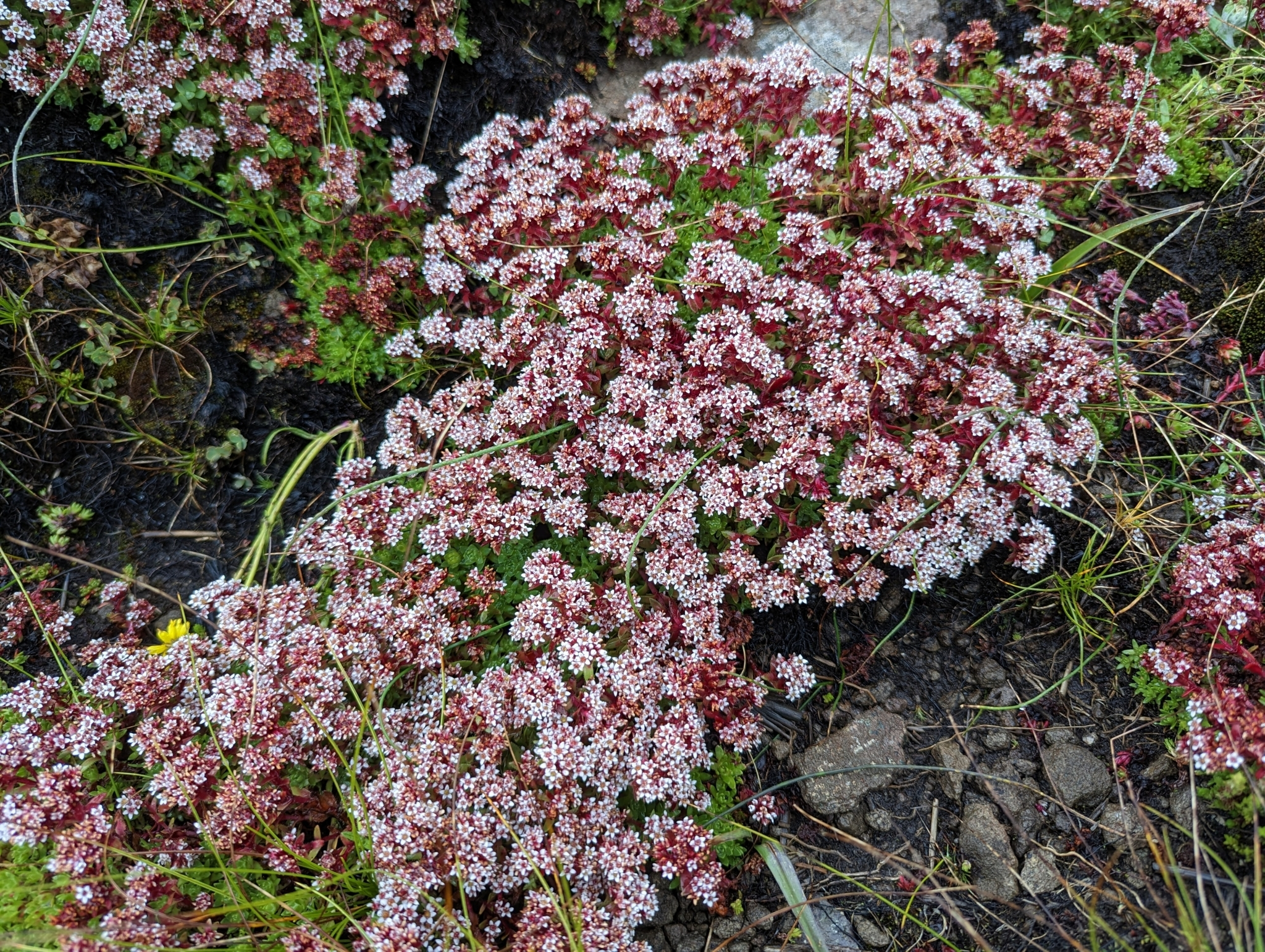

Scientific classification
- Kingdom: Plantae
- Clade: Tracheophytes
- Clade: Angiosperms
- Clade: Eudicots
- Order: Saxifragales
- Family: Crassulaceae
- Genus: Crassula
- Species: C. setulosa

Binomial name
- Crassula setulosa Harv.

= Crassula setulosa =

Species of plant

Crassula setulosa is a species of stonecrop in the family Crassulaceae. It is found mostly in eastern South Africa and Lesotho.

== Taxonomy ==
Crassula setulosa contains the following varieties:

- Crassula setulosa var. deminuta
- Crassula setulosa var. longiciliata
- Crassula setulosa var. jenkinsii
- Crassula setulosa var. rubra
- Crassula setulosa var. setulosa
