= List of Crassula species =

Crassula is a genus of plants in the family Crassulaceae. As of December 2024, Plants of the World Online accepted 216 species.

== A ==
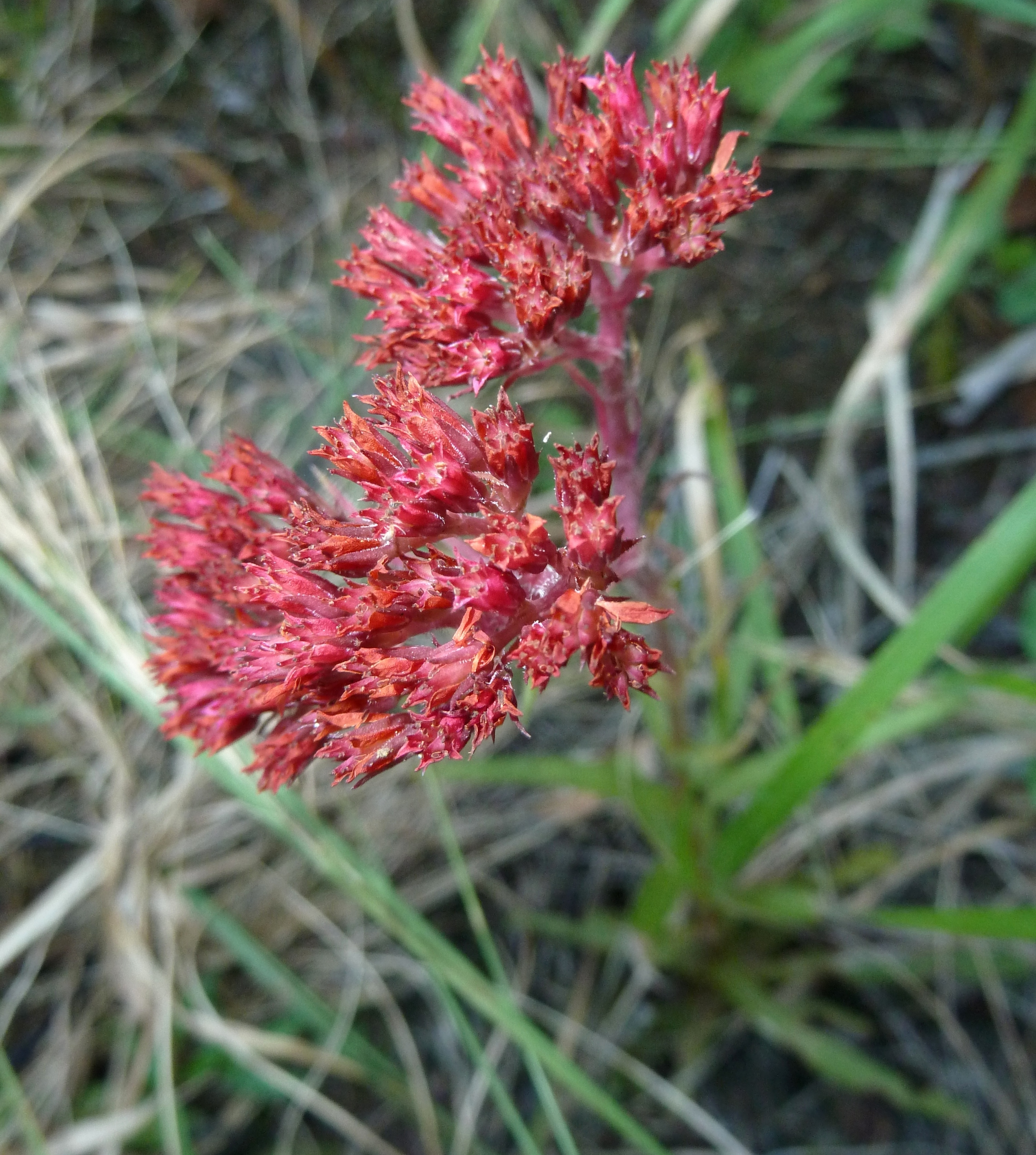
Crassula alba

- Crassula acinaciformis Schinz
- Crassula alata (Viv.) A.Berger
- Crassula alba Forssk.
- Crassula alcicornis Schönland
- Crassula alpestris L.f.
- Crassula alsinoides (Hook.f.) Engl.
- Crassula alstonii Marloth
- Crassula alticola R.Fern.
- Crassula ammophila Toelken
- Crassula ankaratrensis Desc.
- Crassula anso-lerouxiae van Jaarsv.
- Crassula aphylla Schönland & Baker f.
- Crassula aquatica (L.) Schönland
- Crassula arborescens (Mill.) Willd.
- Crassula atropurpurea (Haw.) D.Dietr.
- Crassula aurusbergensis G.Will.
- Crassula ausensis Hutchison

== B ==
- Crassula badspoortensis van Jaarsv.
- Crassula barbata Thunb.
- Crassula barklyi N.E.Br.
- Crassula basaltica Brullo & Siracusa
- Crassula bergioides Harv.
- Crassula bevilanensis Desc.
- Crassula biplanata Haw.
- Crassula brachystachya Toelken
- Crassula brevifolia Harv.

== C ==
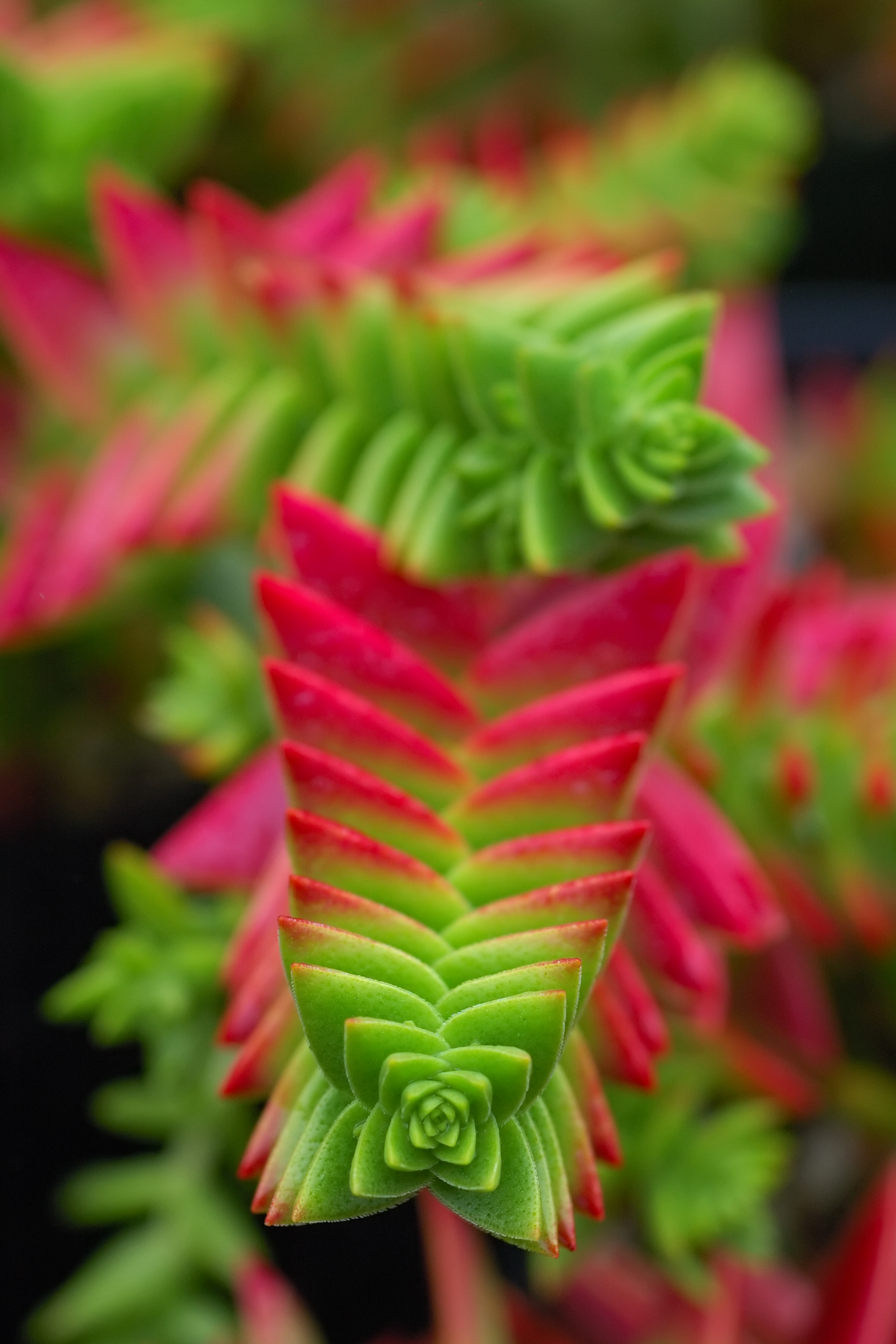
Crassula capitella

- Crassula calcarea N.H.G.Jacobsen
- Crassula campestris (Eckl. & Zeyh.) Endl.
- Crassula capensis (L.) Baill.
- Crassula capitella Thunb.
- Crassula ciliata L.
- Crassula clavata N.E.Br.
- Crassula closiana (Gay) Reiche
- Crassula coccinea L.
- Crassula colligata Toelken
- Crassula colorata (Nees) Ostenf.
- Crassula columella Marloth & Schönland
- Crassula columnaris L.f.
- Crassula compacta Schönland
- Crassula congesta N.E.Br.
- Crassula connata (Ruiz & Pav.) A.Berger
- Crassula cooperi Regel
- Crassula corallina L.f.
- Crassula cordata Thunb.
- Crassula cordifolia Baker
- Crassula cotyledonis Thunb.
- Crassula crassifolia N.H.G.Jacobsen
- Crassula cremnophila van Jaarsv. & A.E.van Wyk
- Crassula crenulata Thunb.
- Crassula cultrata L.
- Crassula cymbiformis Toelken
- Crassula cymosa P.J.Bergius

== D ==
- Crassula deceptor Schönland & Baker f.
- Crassula decidua Schönland
- Crassula decumbens Thunb.
- Crassula deltoidea Thunb.
- Crassula dentata Thunb.
- Crassula dependens Bolus
- Crassula depressa (Eckl. & Zeyh.) Toelken
- Crassula dichotoma L.
- Crassula dodii Schönland & Baker f.
- Crassula drummondii (Torr. & A.Gray) Fedde

== E ==
- Crassula elatinoides (Eckl. & Zeyh.) Friedrich
- Crassula elegans Schönland & Baker f.
- Crassula elsieae Toelken
- Crassula ericoides Haw.
- Crassula exilis Harv.
- Crassula expansa Aiton
- Crassula exserta (Reader) Ostenf.
- Crassula extrorsa Toelken

== F ==
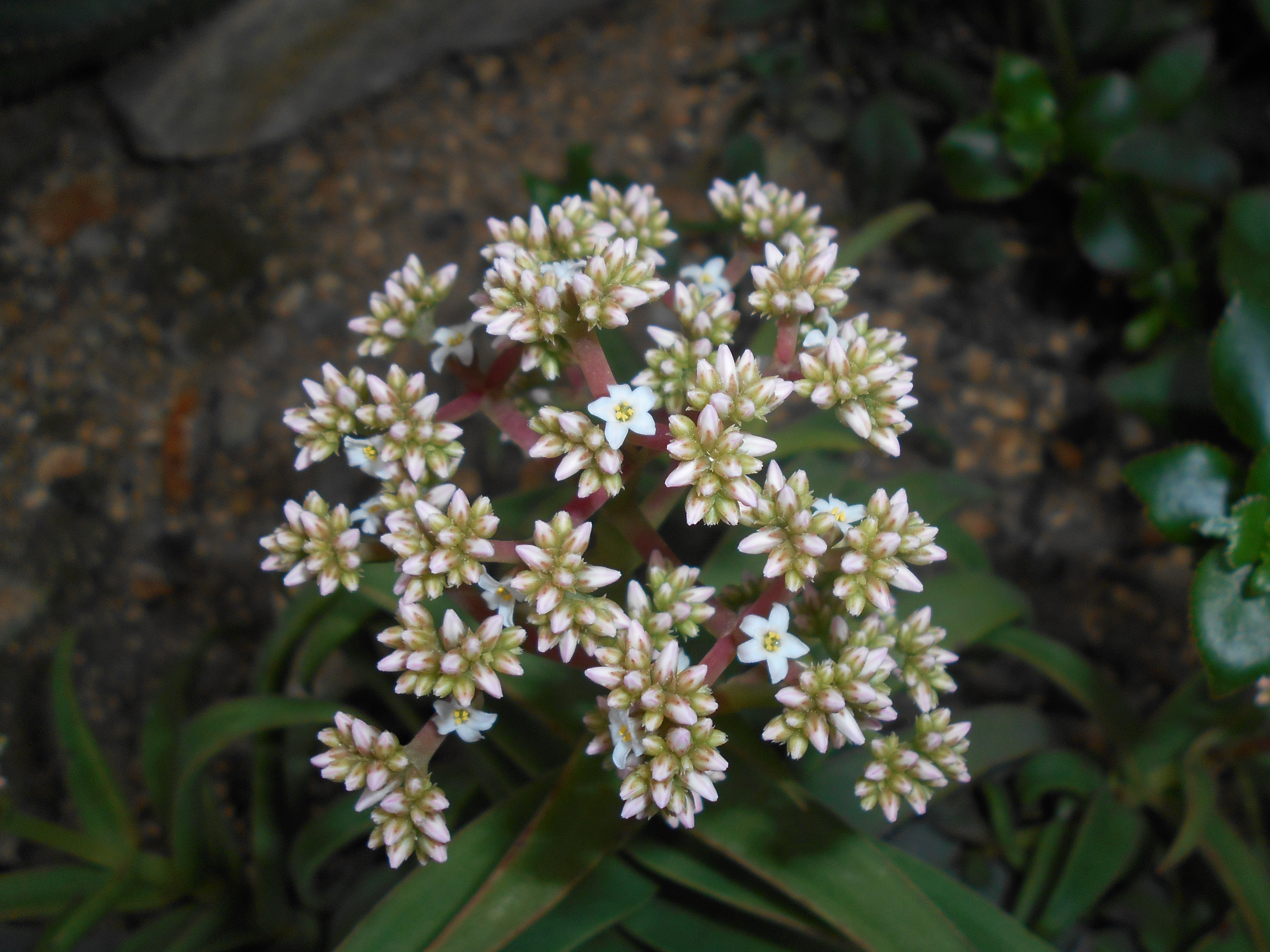
Crassula fusca

- Crassula fallax Friedrich
- Crassula fascicularis Lam.
- Crassula filiformis (Eckl. & Zeyh.) D.Dietr.
- Crassula flanaganii Schönland & Baker f.
- Crassula flava L.
- Crassula floribunda (Friedrich ex Toelken) N.R.Crouch, Gideon F.Sm. & D.Styles
- Crassula foveata van Jaarsv.
- Crassula fragarioides van Jaarsv. & Helme
- Crassula fusca Herre

== G ==
- Crassula garibina Marloth & Schönland
- Crassula gemmifera Friedrich
- Crassula globularioides Britten
- Crassula glomerata P.J.Bergius
- Crassula grammanthoides (Schönland) Toelken
- Crassula granvikii Mildbr.
- Crassula grisea Schönland

== H ==
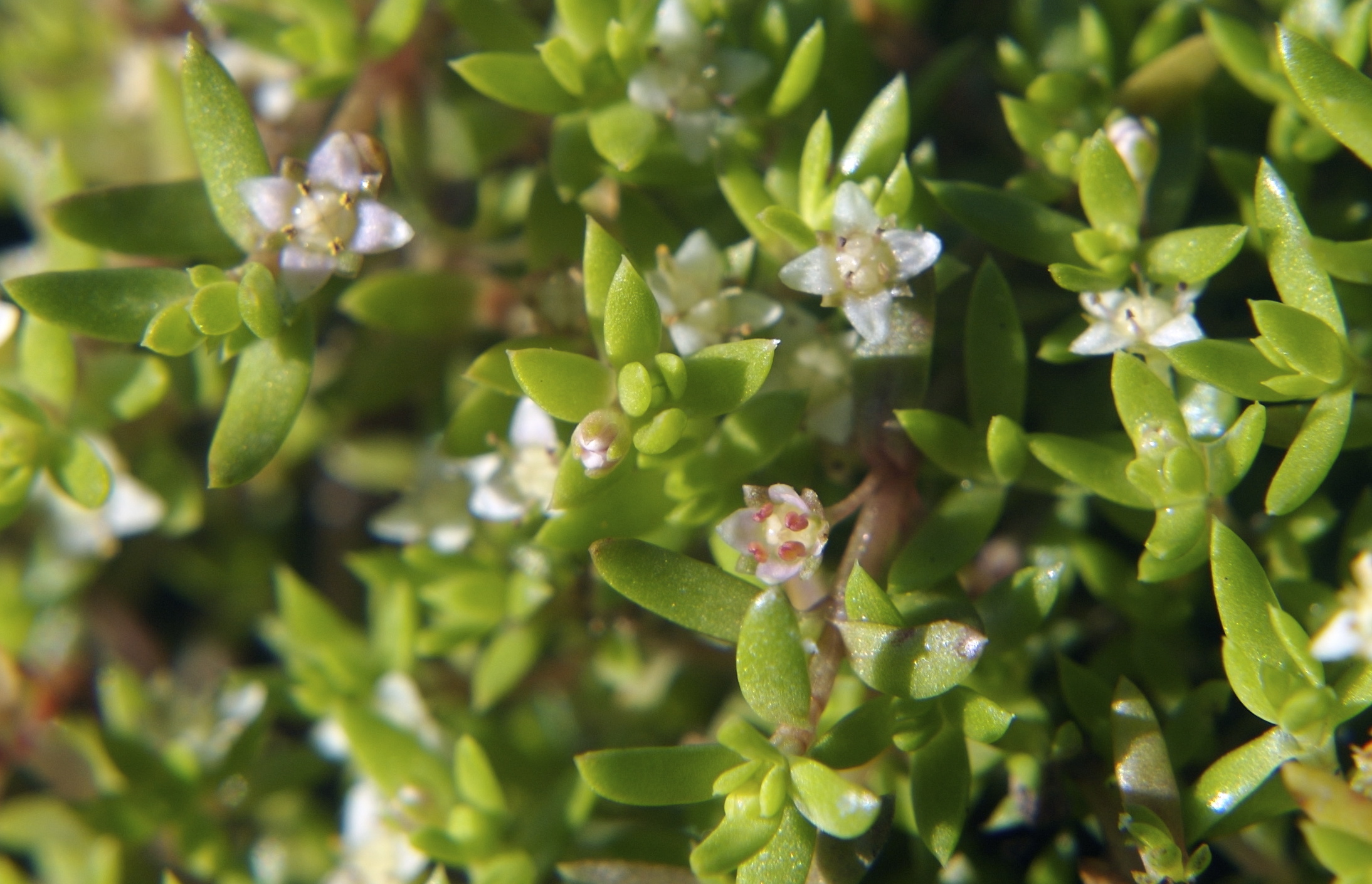
Crassula helmsii

- Crassula helmsii (Kirk) Cockayne
- Crassula hemisphaerica Thunb.
- Crassula hirsuta Schönland & Baker f.
- Crassula hirtipes Harv.
- Crassula humbertii Desc.
- Crassula hunua A.P.Druce

== I ==
- Crassula inandensis Schönland & Baker f.
- Crassula inanis Thunb.
- Crassula intermedia Schönland

== K ==
- Crassula karroica N.H.G.Jacobsen
- Crassula kirkii (Allan) A.P.Druce & Given

== L ==
- Crassula lactea Aiton
- Crassula lanuginosa Harv.
- Crassula lasiantha E.Mey. ex Harv.
- Crassula latibracteata Toelken
- Crassula leachii R.Fern.
- Crassula longipes (Rose) M.Bywater & Wickens

== M ==
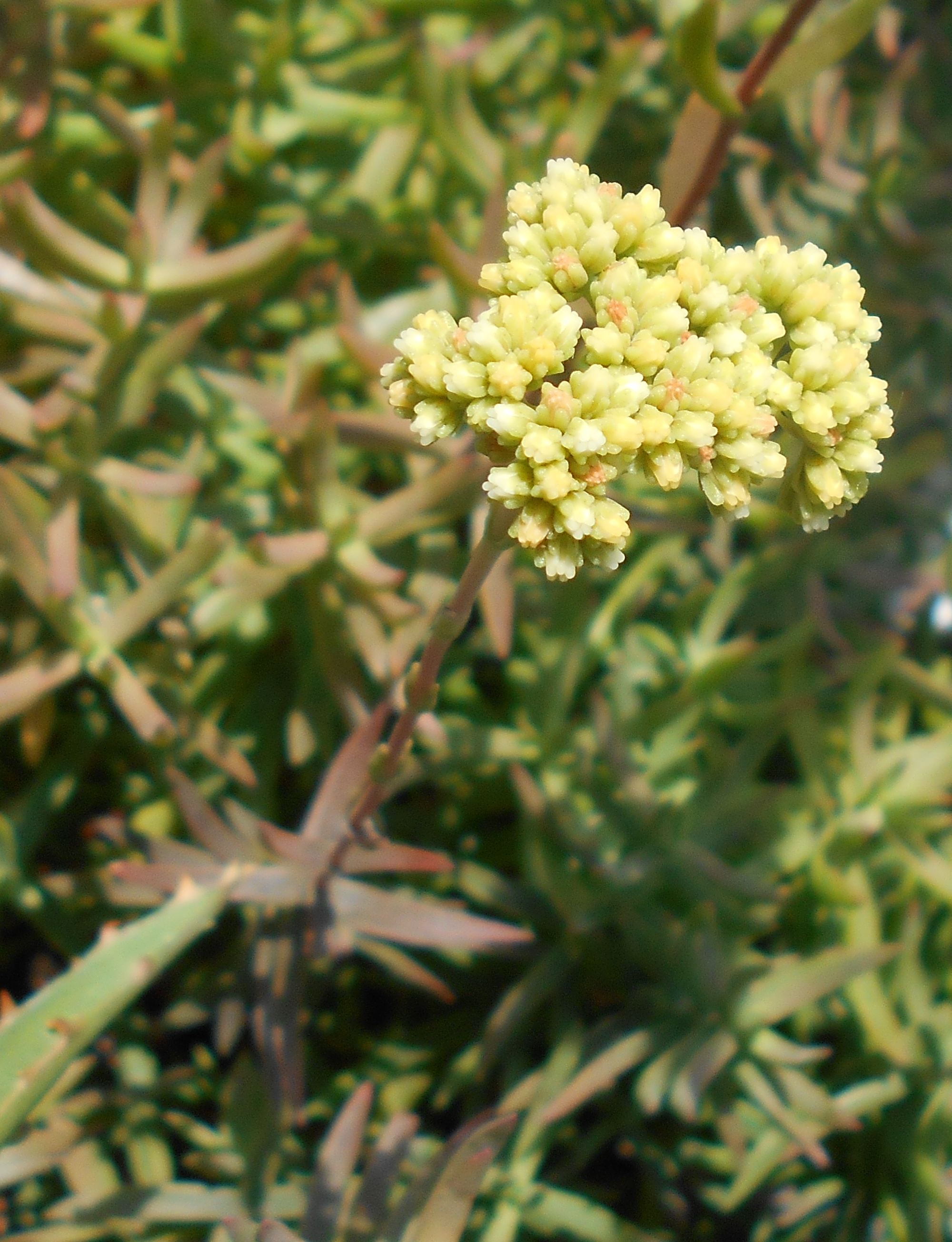
Crassula mollis

- Crassula macowaniana Schönland & Baker f.
- Crassula manaia A.P.Druce & Sykes
- Crassula maputensis R.Fern.
- Crassula × marchandii Friedrich
- Crassula mataikona A.P.Druce
- Crassula mesembryanthemopsis Dinter
- Crassula mesembryanthoides (Haw.) D.Dietr.
- Crassula micans Vahl ex Baill.
- Crassula minuta Toelken
- Crassula minutissima Skottsb.
- Crassula mollis Thunb.
- Crassula moniliformis N.H.G.Jacobsen
- Crassula montana L.f.
- Crassula morrumbalensis R.Fern.
- Crassula × mortii Gideon F.Sm. & N.R.Crouch
- Crassula moschata G.Forst.
- Crassula multicaulis (Petrie) A.P.Druce & Given
- Crassula multicava Lem.
- Crassula multiceps Harv.
- Crassula multiflora Schönland & Baker f.
- Crassula muricata Thunb.
- Crassula muscosa L.

== N ==
- Crassula namaquensis Schönland & Baker f.
- Crassula nanshanchunensis (S.S.Ying) S.S.Ying
- Crassula natalensis Schönland
- Crassula natans Thunb.
- Crassula nemorosa (Eckl. & Zeyh.) Endl.
- Crassula nodulosa Schönland
- Crassula nudicaulis L.
- Crassula numaisensis Friedrich
- Crassula nyikensis Baker

== O ==
- Crassula oblanceolata Schönland & Baker f.
- Crassula obovata Haw.
- Crassula obtusa Haw.
- Crassula orbicularis L.
- Crassula ovata (Mill.) Druce

== P ==
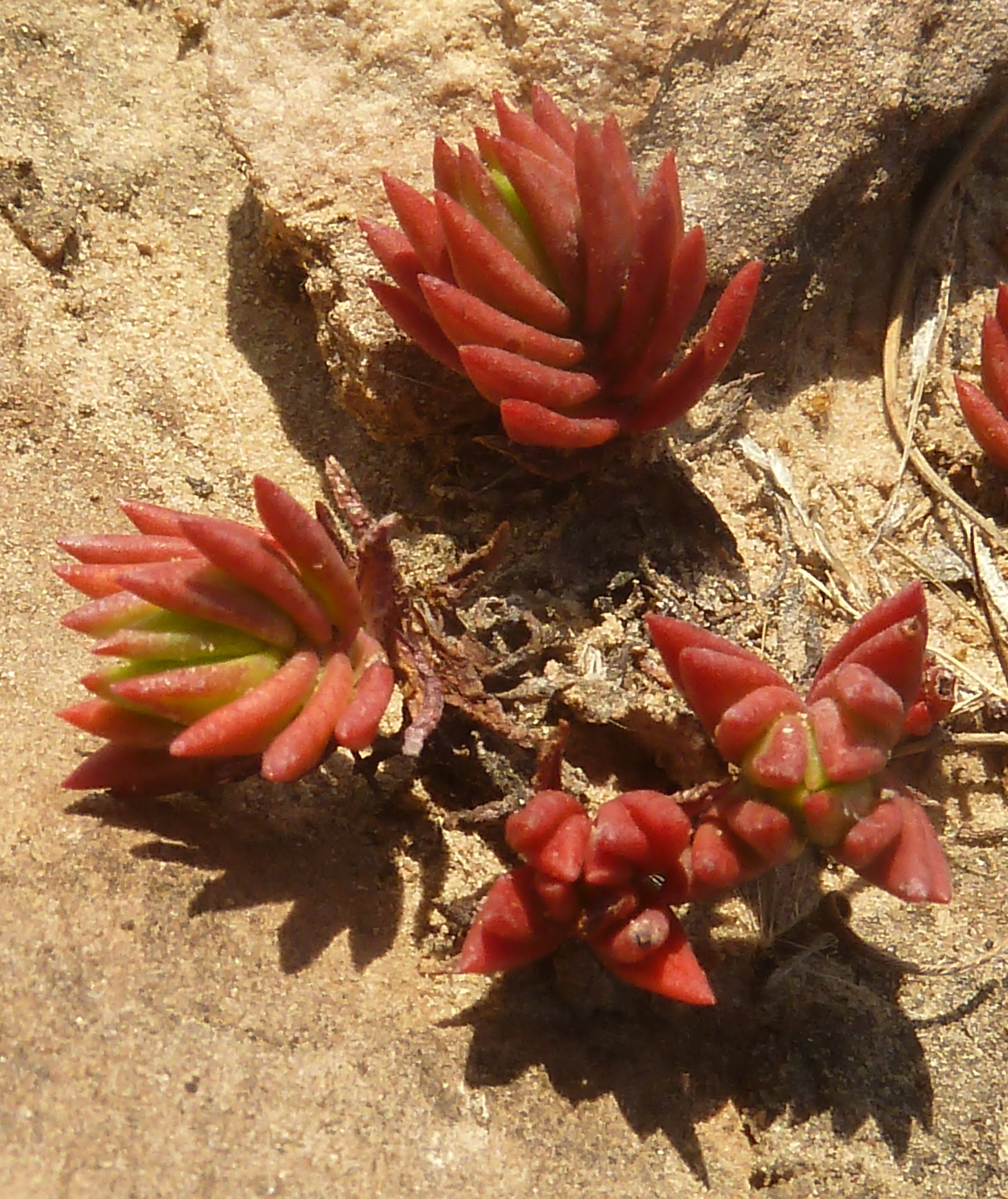
Crassula peploides

- Crassula pageae Toelken
- Crassula pallens Schönland & Baker f.
- Crassula papillosa Schönland & Baker f.
- Crassula peculiaris (Toelken) Toelken & Wickens
- Crassula peduncularis (Sm.) Cambess.
- Crassula pellucida L.
- Crassula peploides Harv.
- Crassula perfoliata L.
- Crassula perforata Thunb.
- Crassula phascoides (Griseb.) M.Bywater
- Crassula planifolia Schönland
- Crassula plegmatoides Friedrich
- Crassula pruinosa L.
- Crassula pseudhemisphaerica Friedrich
- Crassula pubescens Thunb.
- Crassula purcellii Schönland
- Crassula pustulata Toelken
- Crassula pyramidalis Thunb.

== Q ==
- Crassula qoatlhambensis Hargr.
- Crassula quadrifaria N.Jacobsen

== R ==
- Crassula radicans (Haw.) D.Dietr.
- Crassula rattrayi Diels ex Schönland & Baker f.
- Crassula rhodesica (Merxm.) Wickens & M.Bywater
- Crassula rogersii Schönland
- Crassula roggeveldii Schönland
- Crassula ruamahanga A.P.Druce
- Crassula rubricaulis Eckl. & Zeyh.
- Crassula rudolfii Schönland & Baker f.
- Crassula rupestris L.f.

== S ==
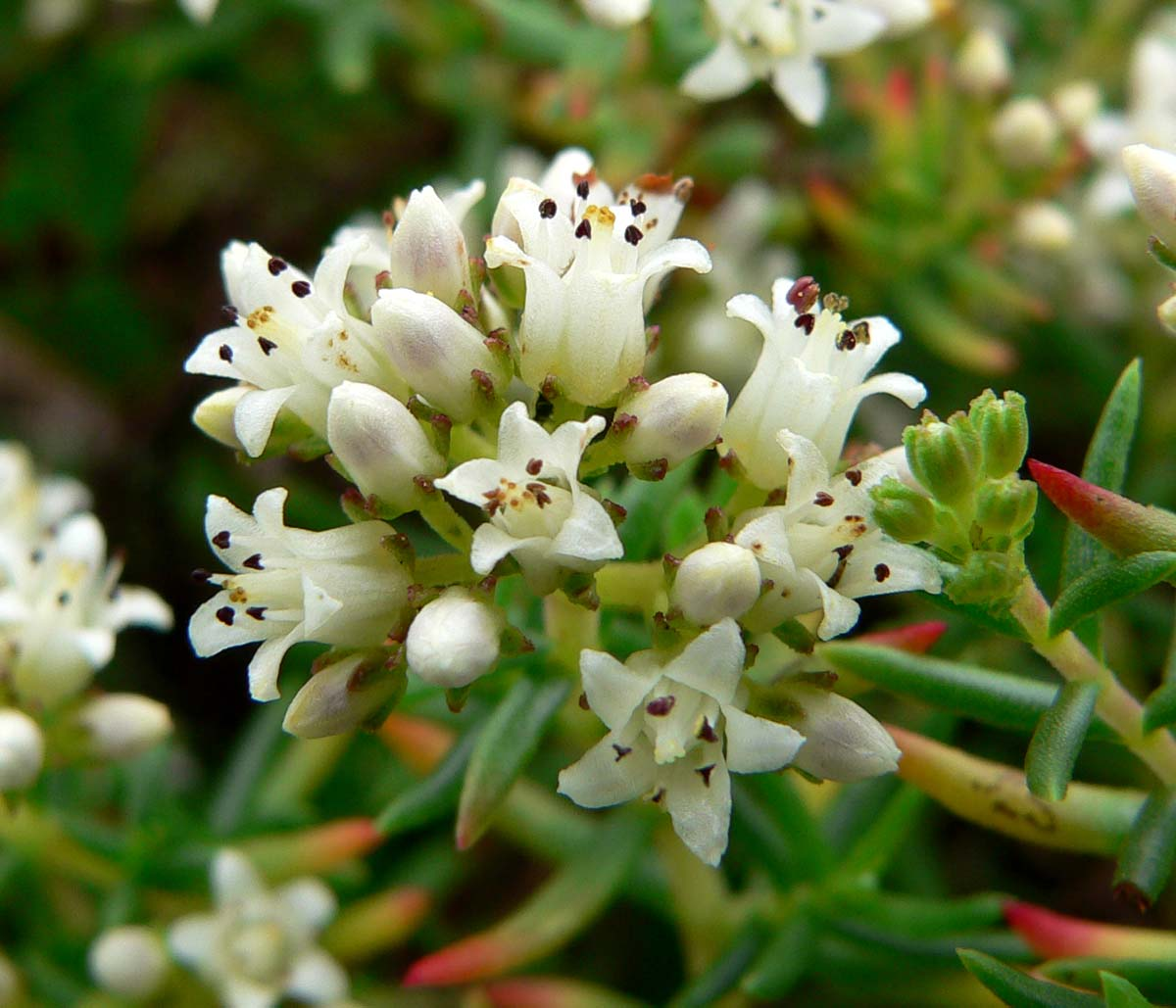
Crassula sarcocaulis

- Crassula saginoides (Maxim.) M.Bywater & Wickens
- Crassula sandrae N.H.G.Jacobsen
- Crassula sarcocaulis Eckl. & Zeyh.
- Crassula sarmentosa Harv.
- Crassula saxifraga Harv.
- Crassula scabra L.
- Crassula × scabrella Haw.
- Crassula schimperi Fisch. & C.A.Mey.
- Crassula sebaeoides (Eckl. & Zeyh.) Toelken
- Crassula sediflora (Eckl. & Zeyh.) Endl.
- Crassula sericea Schönland
- Crassula × serpentaria Schönland
- Crassula setulosa Harv.
- Crassula sieberiana (Schult. & Schult.f.) Druce
- Crassula simulans Schönland
- Crassula sinclairii (Hook.f.) A.P.Druce & Given
- Crassula sladenii Schönland
- Crassula smithii van Jaarsv., D.G.A.Styles & G.McDonald
- Crassula socialis Schönland
- Crassula solieri (Gay) F.Meigen
- Crassula southii Schönland
- Crassula spathulata Thunb.
- Crassula streyi Toelken
- Crassula strigosa L.
- Crassula stylesii Gideon F.Sm. & N.R.Crouch
- Crassula subacaulis Schönland & Baker f.
- Crassula subaphylla (Eckl. & Zeyh.) Harv.
- Crassula subulata L.
- Crassula susannae Rauh & Friedrich

== T ==
- Crassula tabularis Dinter
- Crassula tecta Thunb.
- Crassula tenuicaulis Schönland
- Crassula tenuipedicellata Schönland & Baker f.
- Crassula tetragona L.
- Crassula tetramera (Toelken) A.P.Druce & Sykes
- Crassula thunbergiana Schult.
- Crassula tillaea Lest.-Garl.
- Crassula tomentosa Thunb.
- Crassula tuberella Toelken

== U ==
- Crassula umbella Jacq.
- Crassula umbellata Thunb.
- Crassula umbraticola N.E.Br.
- Crassula undulata Haw.

== V ==
- Crassula vaginata Eckl. & Zeyh.
- Crassula vaillantii (Willd.) Roth
- Crassula venezuelensis (Steyerm.) M.Bywater & Wickens
- Crassula vestita Thunb.
- Crassula viridis (S.Watson) M.Bywater & Wickens
- Crassula volkensii Engl.

== W ==
- Crassula werneri N.H.G.Jacobsen
- Crassula whiteheadii Harv.

== Z ==
- Crassula zombensis Baker f.
