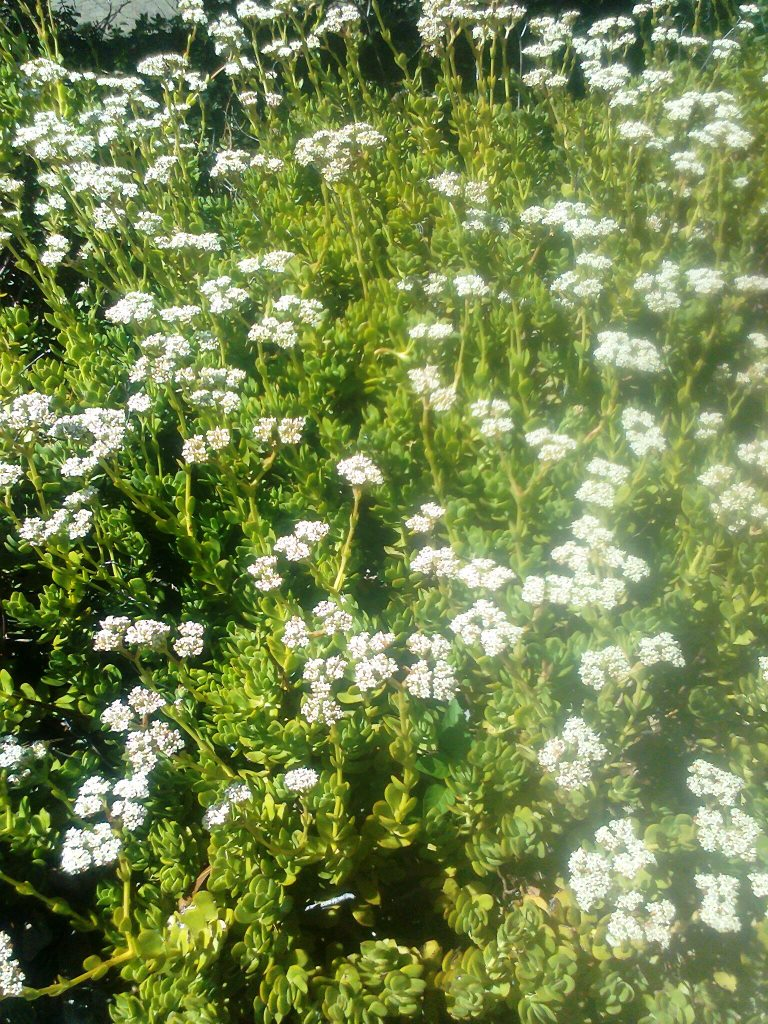
- Crassula rubricaulis

Scientific classification
- Kingdom: Plantae
- Clade: Tracheophytes
- Clade: Angiosperms
- Clade: Eudicots
- Order: Saxifragales
- Family: Crassulaceae
- Genus: Crassula
- Species: C. rubricaulis

Binomial name
- Crassula rubricaulis Eckl. & Zeyh.

= Crassula rubricaulis =

Red-stem Crassula

Species of plant

Crassula rubricaulis (Red-stem Crassula) is a succulent plant native to the coastal mountains of the Eastern Cape and Western Cape of South Africa.

== Description ==
This species can be distinguished by its fleshy, succulent leaves, which are a minimum of 2 mm in thickness. In addition, the leaves are smooth, sessile, egg-shaped (with the narrowest part against the stem), with bright red margins. The leaf normally has a faint line of hair, along its reddish margins (but the hairs tend to fall off at the leaf tip).

In its growth form, C. rubricaulis becomes a small (30-50 cm), rounded, branching, perennial shrub, with smooth, red-brown stems ("rubricaulis"="red-stemmed"). The hard, brittle branches root if they lie against the ground.

It produces large numbers of white, star-shaped flowers in the middle and late Summer.

It is a close relative of the species Crassula dejecta (now Crassula undulata), which also inhabits the mountains of the south western Cape.

== Distribution ==
The Red-stem Crassula occurs around the Riviersonderend and Langeberg mountains in the west, in the coastal rocky mountain shrub around Knysna and as far east as Port Elizabeth.
