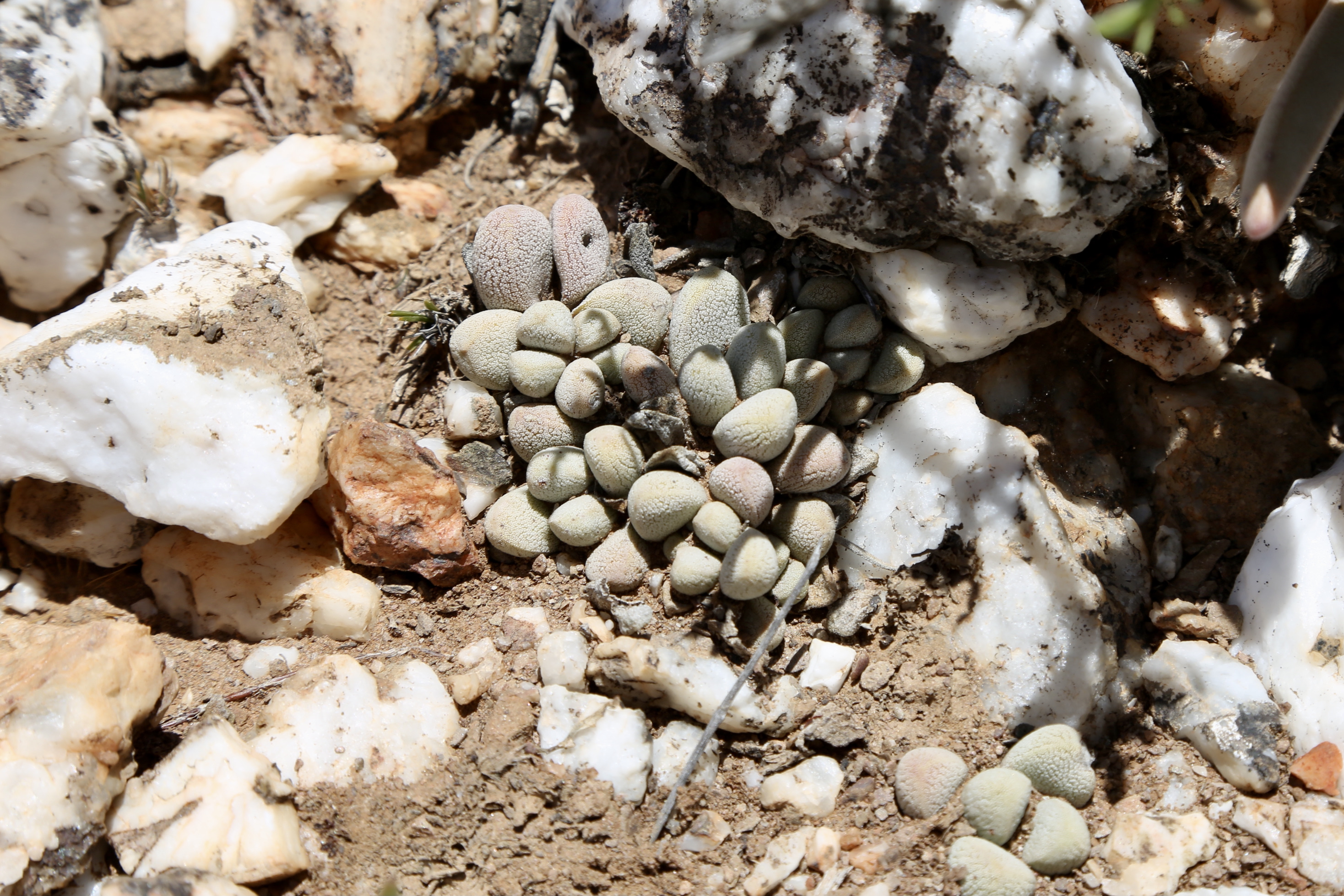

Scientific classification
- Kingdom: Plantae
- Clade: Tracheophytes
- Clade: Angiosperms
- Clade: Eudicots
- Order: Saxifragales
- Family: Crassulaceae
- Genus: Crassula
- Species: C. tecta

Binomial name
- Crassula tecta Thunb.

= Crassula tecta =

Species of plant

Crassula tecta is a species of succulent plant in the genus Crassula native to South Africa. Easily confused with Crassula namaquensis, this species has a compact growth habit forming clusters of round, blue-white leaves. Kept in cultivation since the 18th century, Crassula tecta is known for the beautiful patterning on its leaves and white flowers.
