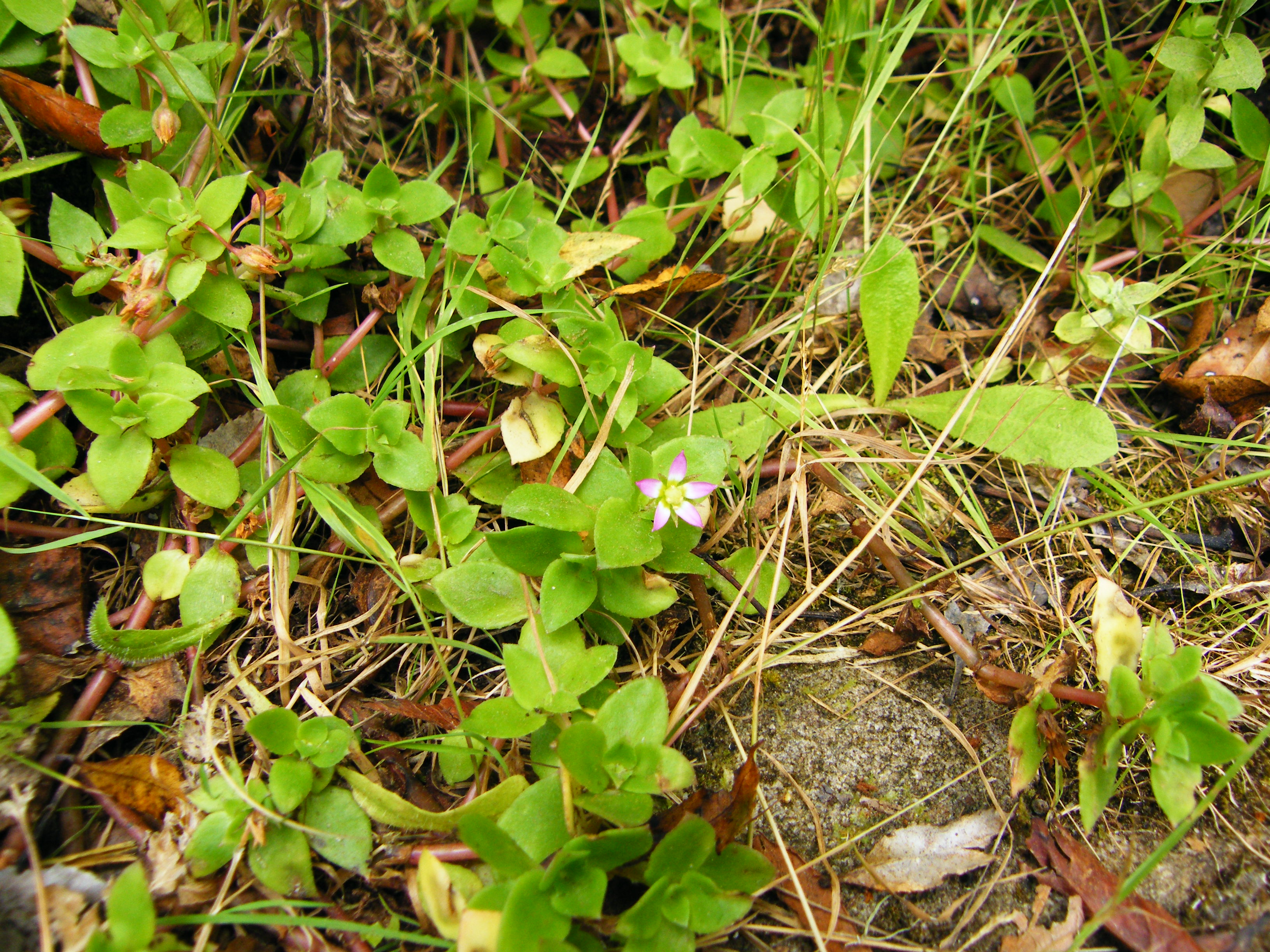
- Crassula pellucida subsp. pellucida, growing on the eastern flank of Table Mountain

Scientific classification
- Kingdom: Plantae
- Clade: Tracheophytes
- Clade: Angiosperms
- Clade: Eudicots
- Order: Saxifragales
- Family: Crassulaceae
- Genus: Crassula
- Species: C. pellucida

Binomial name
- Crassula pellucida L. (1753)

Synonyms
- Gomara pellucida (L.) P.V.Heath (1993)

= Crassula pellucida =

Species of plant

Crassula pellucida is a creeping, succulent ground-cover, or low-growing, spreading succulent shrub. It is native to eastern and southern Africa, ranging from Kenya and Angola to South Africa.

It is highly variable, tolerates shade, and several forms are popular in cultivation.

== Description ==
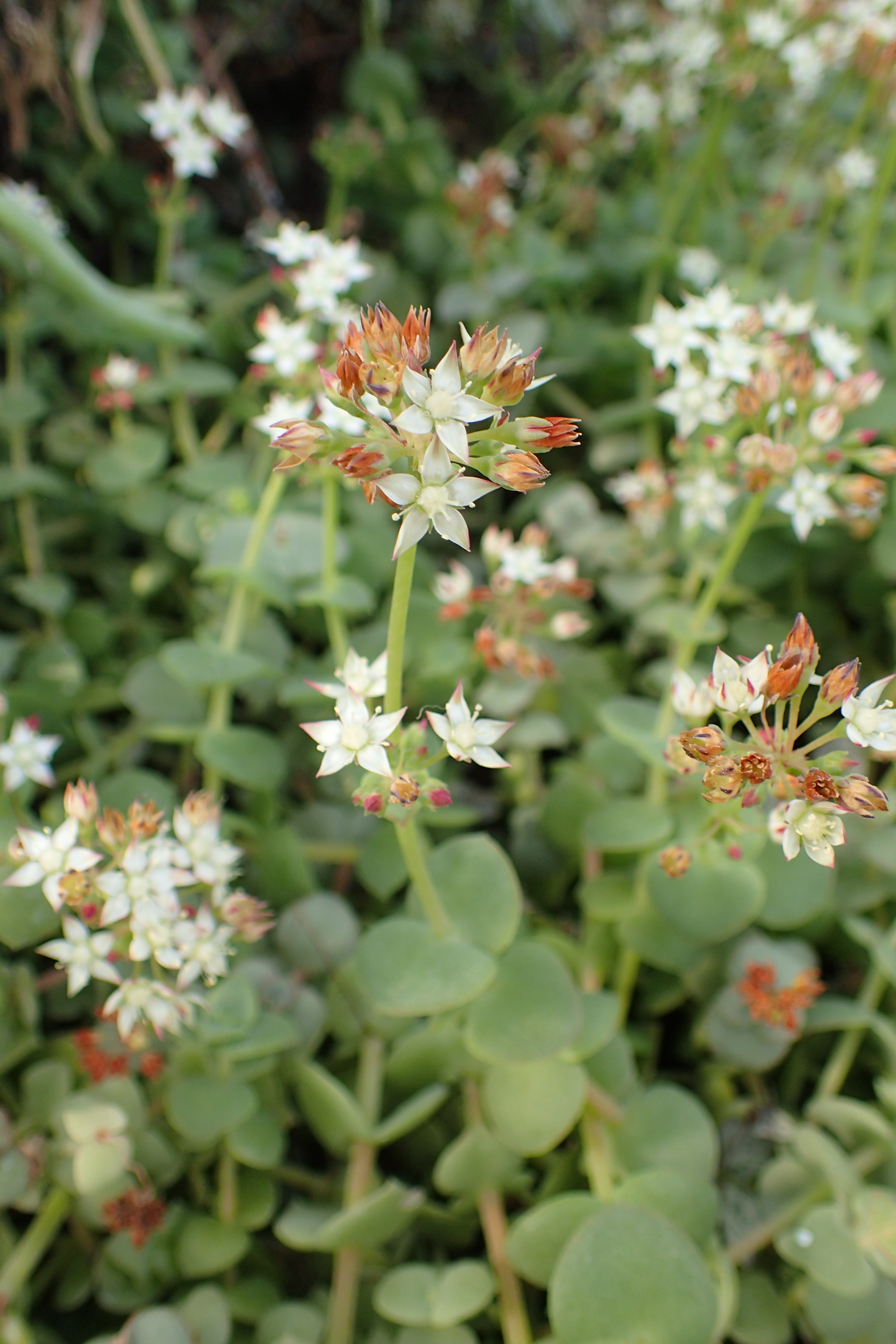
Flower detail: C. pellucida subsp. pellucida

The small ovate-rounded leaves have barely visible stalks, or are sessile (leaf-base fixed around the stem, without any stalk). This feature helps to distinguish this species from the similar and closely related Crassula spathulata.

The leaves have faintly toothed margins. Small, pink-white, star-shaped flowers appear in Autumn or late Summer.

=== Subspecies and distribution ===
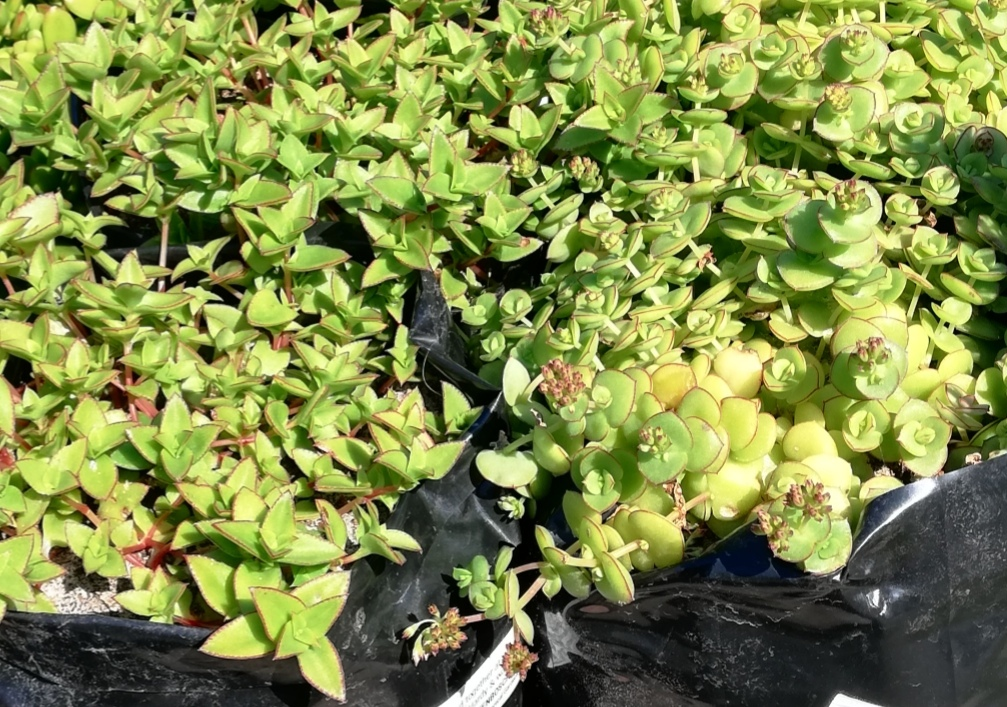
Subspecies brachypetala (left); and marginalis (right)

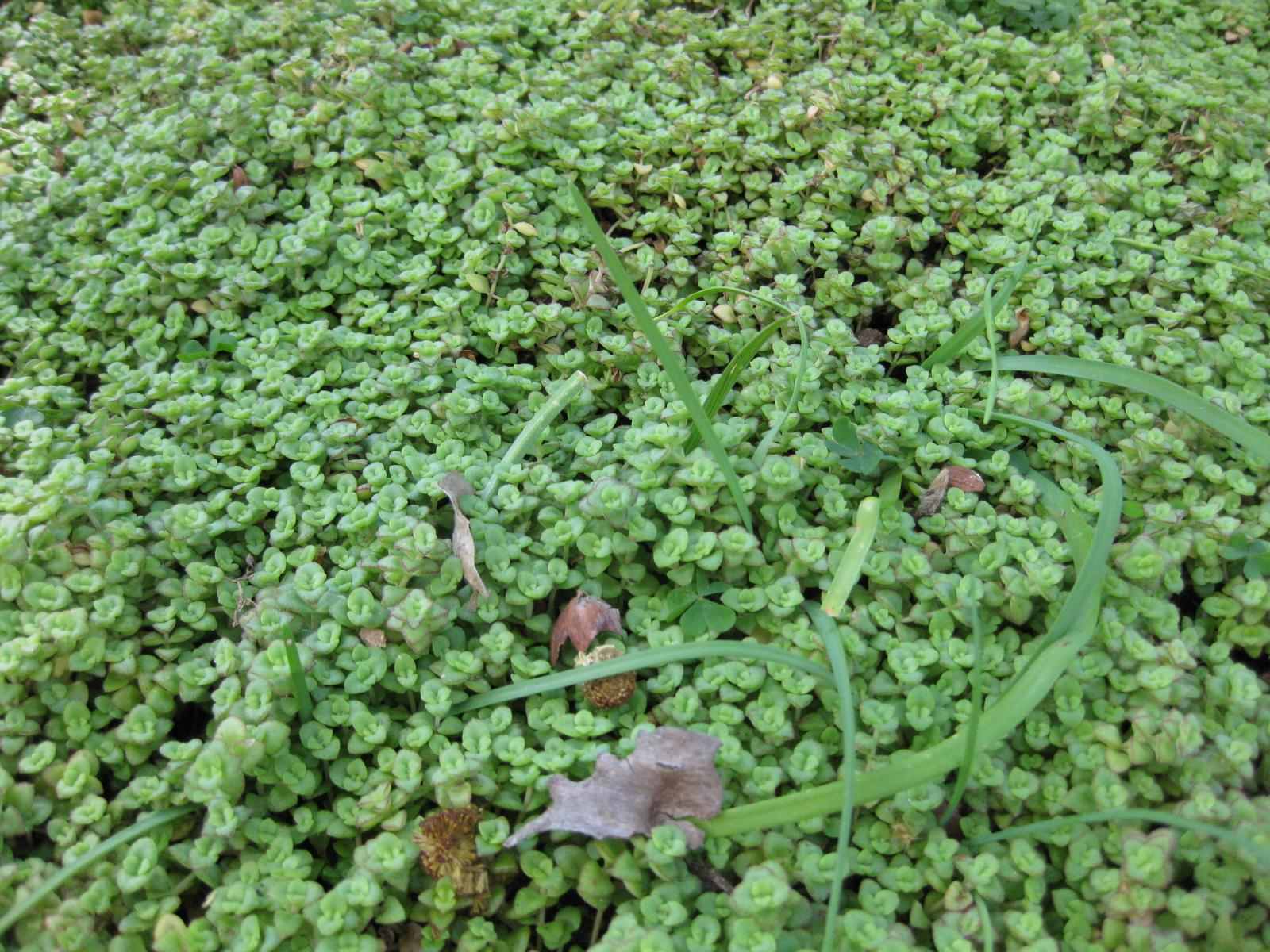
A petite form of C.pellucida subps. marginalis, here cultivated as a ground-cover

Four subspecies are accepted:

  - subsp. pellucida. This nominate subspecies has soft, green, rounded leaves. It occurs in shaded, rocky forested areas of the southern Cape, from Cape Town to East London.
  - subsp. brachypetala (E.Mey. ex Harv.) Toelken. This variable subspecies has hairs at the leaf-bases, and can sometimes have more pointed lanceolate leaves. It occurs widely across the eastern (summer-rainfall) half of South Africa and in southern tropical and eastern tropical Africa.
  - subsp. marginalis (Aiton) Toelken. This unique subspecies has fused, disc-like leaf-pairs, densely packed along its pendent stems (looking similar to C.rupestris or C.perforata). It occurs in the far south-eastern Cape, from George to East London.
  - subsp. spongiosa Toelken. Cape Provinces.
