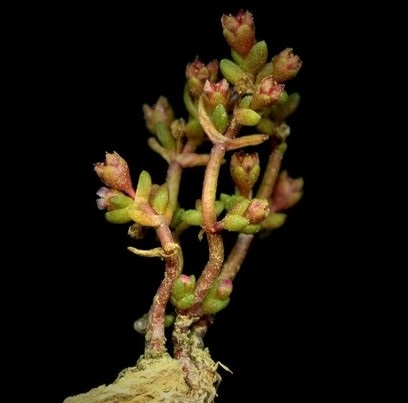

Scientific classification
- Kingdom: Plantae
- Clade: Embryophytes
- Clade: Tracheophytes
- Clade: Angiosperms
- Clade: Eudicots
- Order: Saxifragales
- Family: Crassulaceae
- Genus: Crassula
- Species: C. vaillantii

Binomial name
- Crassula vaillantii (Willd.) Roth

Synonyms
- Bulliarda vaillantii (Willd.) DC.; Hydrophila vaillantii (Willd.) House; Tillaea vaillantii Willd.; Tillaeastrum vaillantii (Willd.) Britton; Bulliarda pedunculata St.-Lag.; Bulliarda rosea Bubani; Tillaea pedunculata Willd.; Elatine aetolica Halácsy & Wettst.

= Crassula vaillantii =

Species of plant

Crassula vaillantii is a species of herb in the family Crassulaceae. They are succulent plants.

== Sources ==
This article incorporates text from a free content work. Licensed under CC0 (license statement/permission). Text taken from Crassula vaillantii. Encyclopedia of Life.
