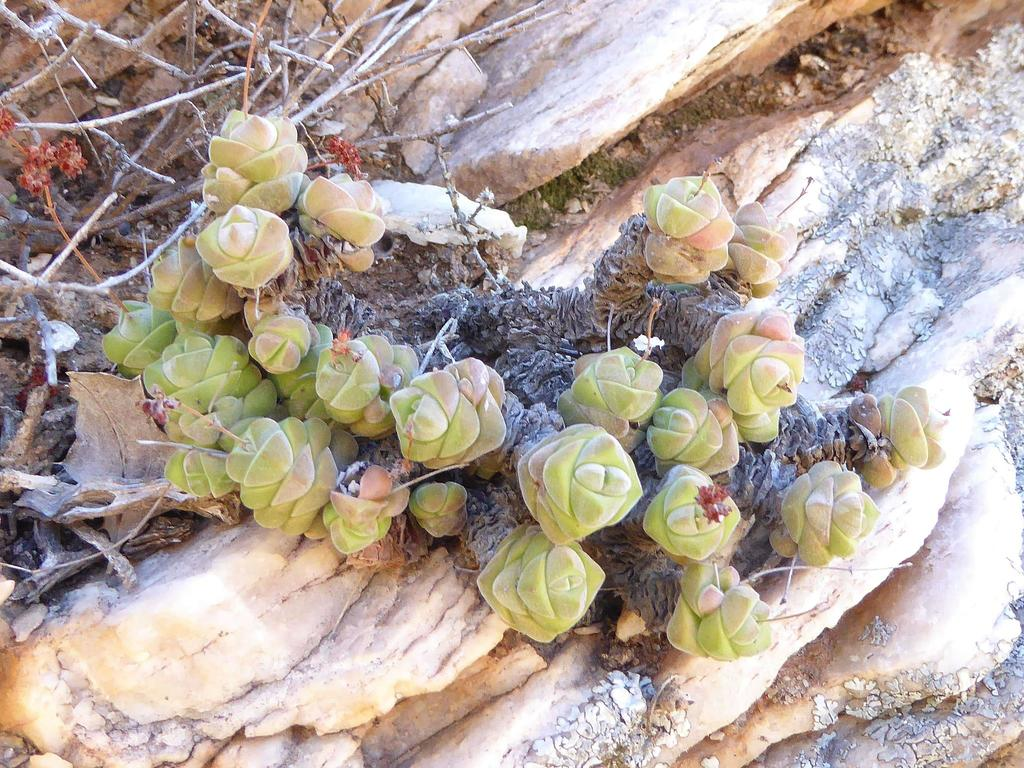
- In situ

Scientific classification
- Kingdom: Plantae
- Clade: Embryophytes
- Clade: Tracheophytes
- Clade: Angiosperms
- Clade: Eudicots
- Order: Saxifragales
- Family: Crassulaceae
- Genus: Crassula
- Species: C. columella

Binomial name
- Crassula columella Marloth & Schönland

= Crassula columella =

Species of flowering plant

Crassula columella is a species of succulent plant in the family Crassulaceae. It is native to the west coast of South Africa and Namibia. It grows slowly in spring and autumn, and is dormant in summer.
