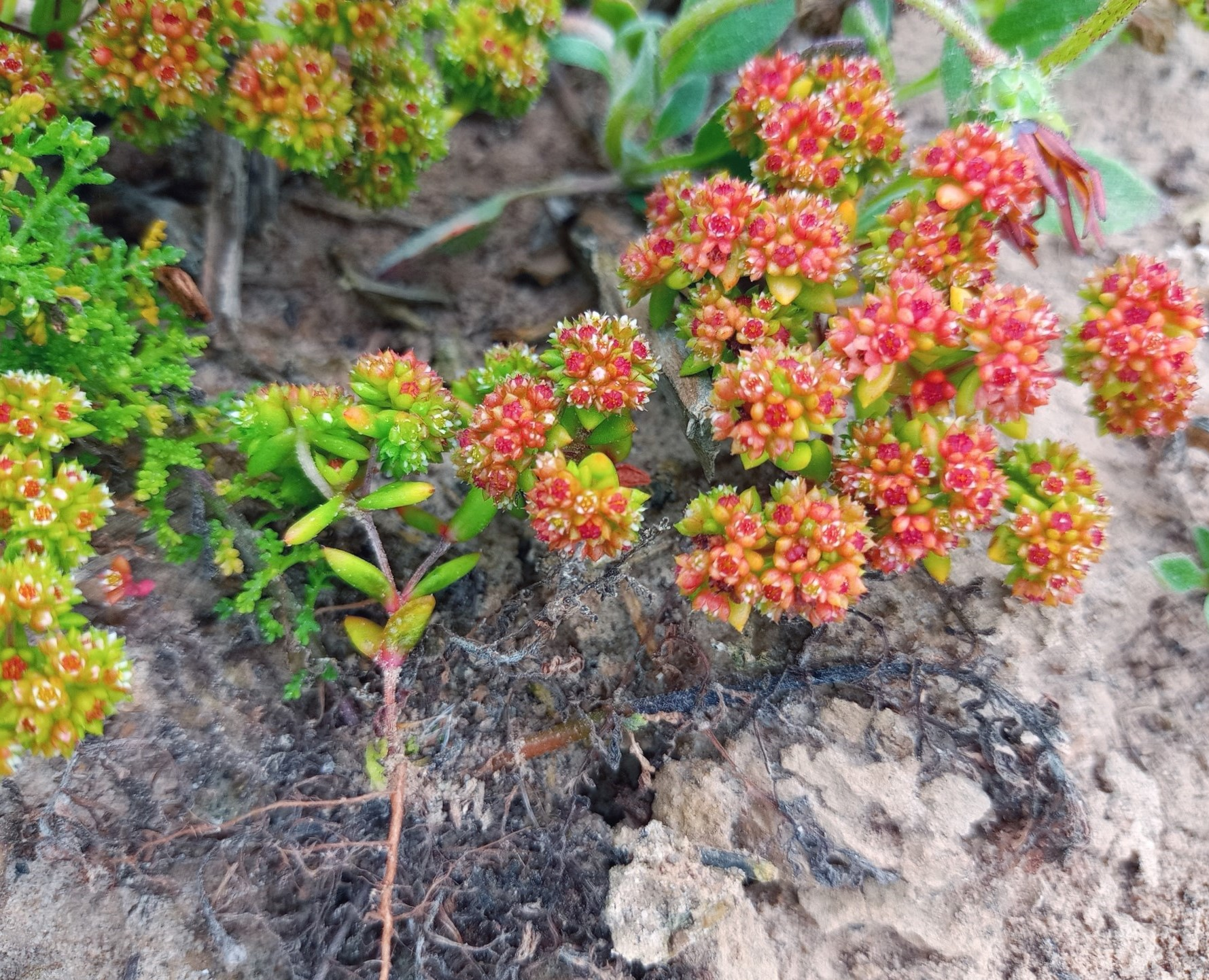
- Crassula glomerata flowers

Scientific classification
- Kingdom: Plantae
- Clade: Tracheophytes
- Clade: Angiosperms
- Clade: Eudicots
- Order: Saxifragales
- Family: Crassulaceae
- Genus: Crassula
- Species: C. glomerata

Binomial name
- Crassula glomerata P.J.Bergius

= Crassula glomerata =

Orange Stonecrop

Species of succulent

Crassula glomerata, the orange stonecrop, is a herb in the family Crassulaceae.

The succulent annual herb has an erect habit and typically grows to a height of 4 to 15 centimetres (1.6 to 5.9 in). It blooms between August and November producing white-red flowers.

It has become naturalised in Western Australia where it is found on coastal dunes and plains along the coast in the Great Southern, Wheatbelt, South West and Peel regions.
