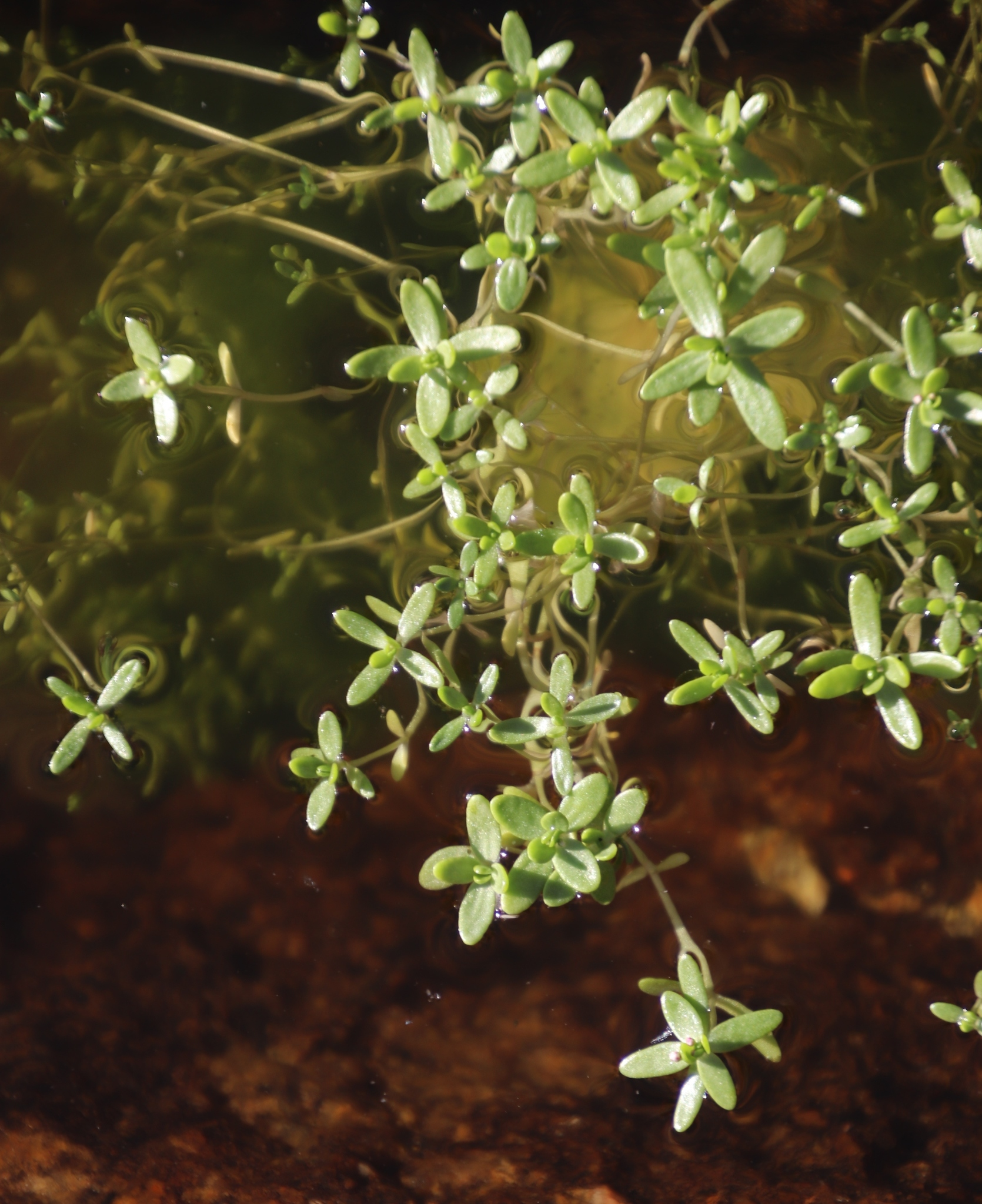

Scientific classification
- Kingdom: Plantae
- Clade: Tracheophytes
- Clade: Angiosperms
- Clade: Eudicots
- Order: Saxifragales
- Family: Crassulaceae
- Genus: Crassula
- Species: C. natans

Binomial name
- Crassula natans Thunb.

Synonyms
- Bulliarda capensis; Helophytum natans; Tillaea filiformis; Tillaea filiformis var. parvula; Tillaea fluitans var. intermedia; Tillaea fluitans var. obovata; Tillaea reflexa

= Crassula natans =

Floating pigmyweed

Species of succulent

Crassula natans, commonly known as floating pigmyweed, is a herb in the family Crassulaceae.

This annual herb is often found in an aquatic environment. It blooms between July and November producing white-pink flowers. The plant has decumbent filiform branches that are around 10 centimetres (3.9 in) in length and are often multi-branched when growing in marshy area, or slender floating branches up to 25 cm (9.8 in) in length. It has linear shaped leaves linear approximately 8 millimetres (0.31 in) long and 1 mm (0.039 in) wide in marsh plants, or for floating plants with a length of 14 mm (0.6 in) and a width of 2 mm (0.079 in).

The plant is endemic to the wetlands of Cape Fold area of the Western Cape region of South Africa. It has become naturalised in Western Australia where it is found in winter wet depressions and in gullies and lakes in the Great Southern, Wheatbelt, South West and Peel regions. It is also found throughout southern South Australia, New South Wales and Victoria.

== Botany ==
The plants often grow in and around shallow standing water of rock pools and dams. On moist soil, the plants are often a deep red, tufted and below 2.4 inches, and with 3 flowers per node. When submerged, the buoyant branches can reach up to 14 inches (35 cm) in length and are enlarged at the base, where they support narrow linear leaves, whereas the floating leaves are oblong and much broader, and only occasionally produce more than one flower per node.

=== Flower ===
The flowers are often white and cup-shaped, they can be white or pink
