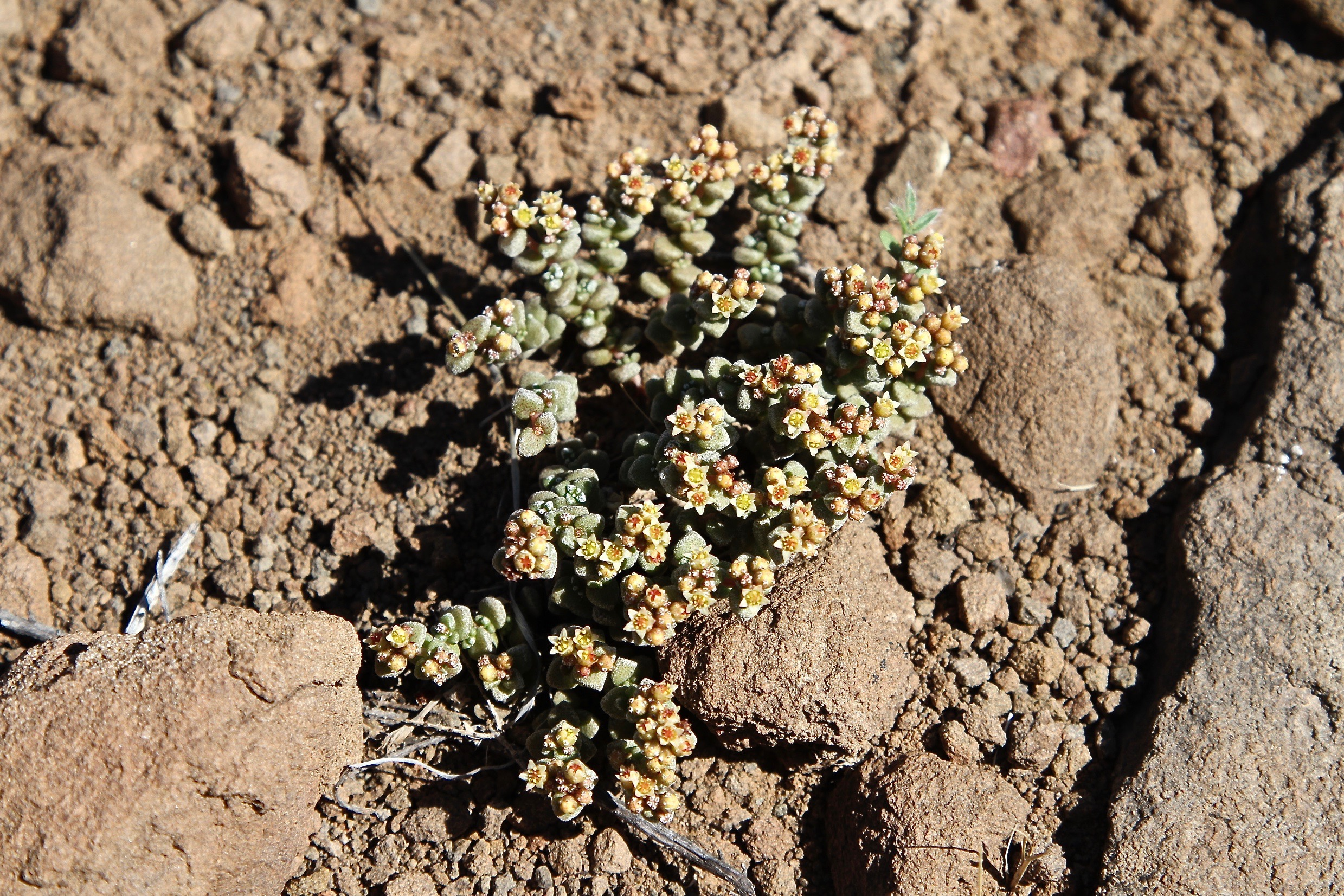
- A flowering plant

Scientific classification
- Kingdom: Plantae
- Clade: Embryophytes
- Clade: Tracheophytes
- Clade: Angiosperms
- Clade: Eudicots
- Order: Saxifragales
- Family: Crassulaceae
- Genus: Crassula
- Species: C. corallina

Binomial name
- Crassula corallina L.f.

= Crassula corallina =

Species of flowering plant

Crassula corallina is a species of succulent plant in the genus Crassula from Central South Africa and Southeastern Namibia. It grows as mats in dry habitats and is typically short-lived.
