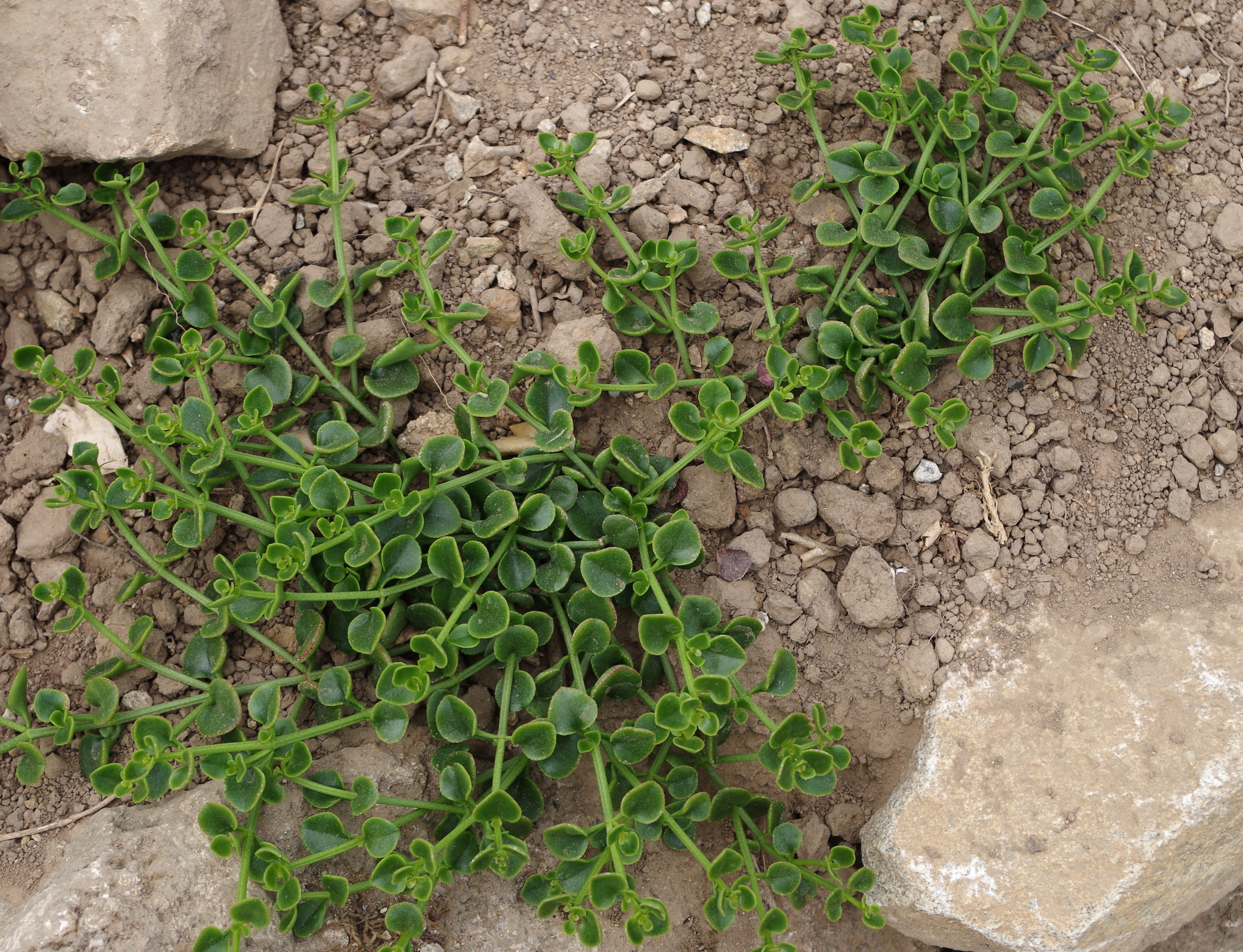

Scientific classification
- Kingdom: Plantae
- Clade: Tracheophytes
- Clade: Angiosperms
- Clade: Eudicots
- Order: Saxifragales
- Family: Crassulaceae
- Genus: Crassula
- Species: C. spathulata

Binomial name
- Crassula spathulata Eckl. & Zeyh.

= Crassula spathulata =

Species of plant

Crassula spathulata (Spathula-leaf Crassula) is a creeping, succulent ground-cover, indigenous to the Eastern Cape Province of South Africa, where it is found in leaf-litter on rocky ridges, often around the edges of forests.

It is common as a ground-cover in cultivation, and several different cultivars are in circulation.

== Description ==
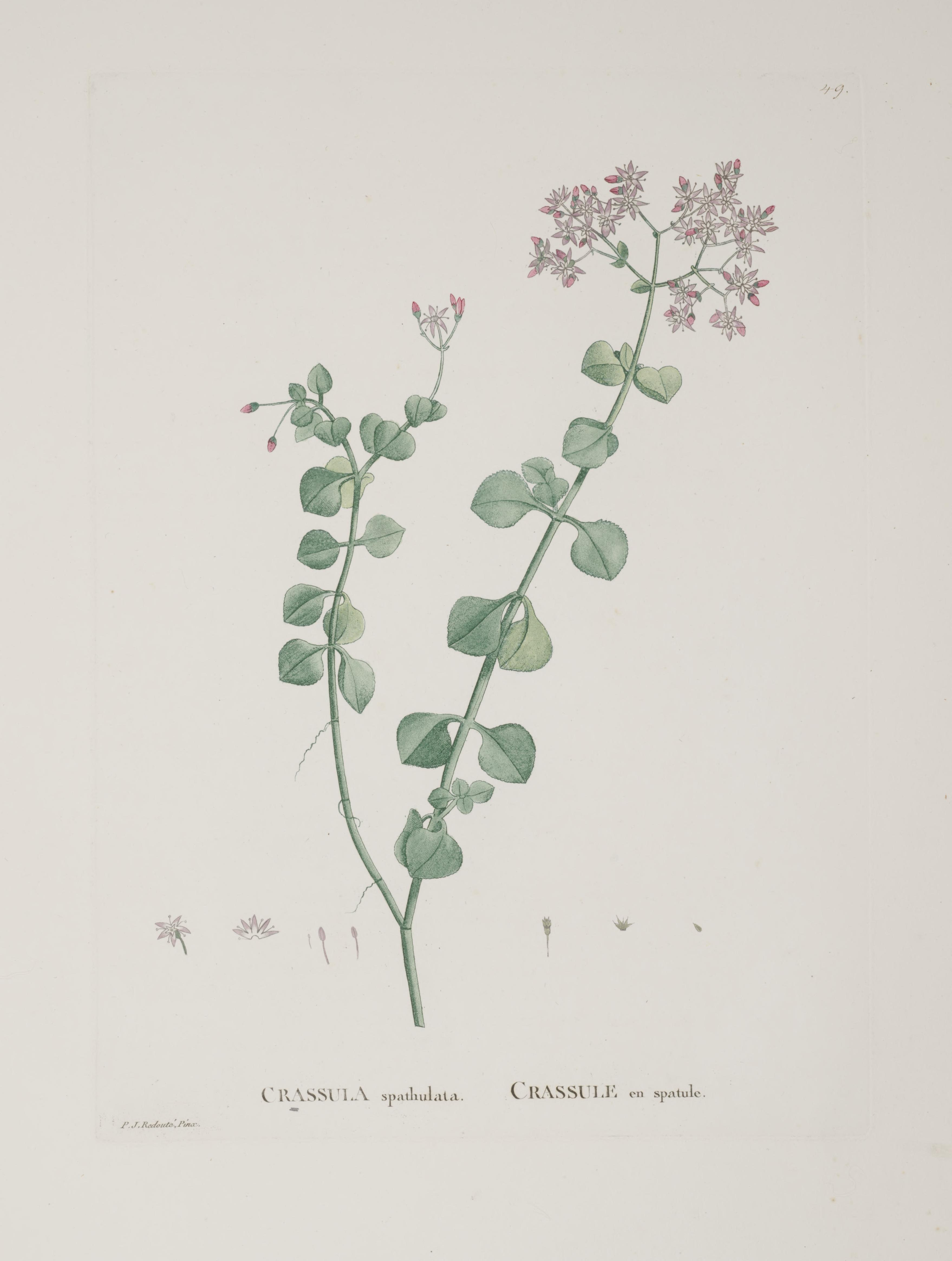
Botanical illustration

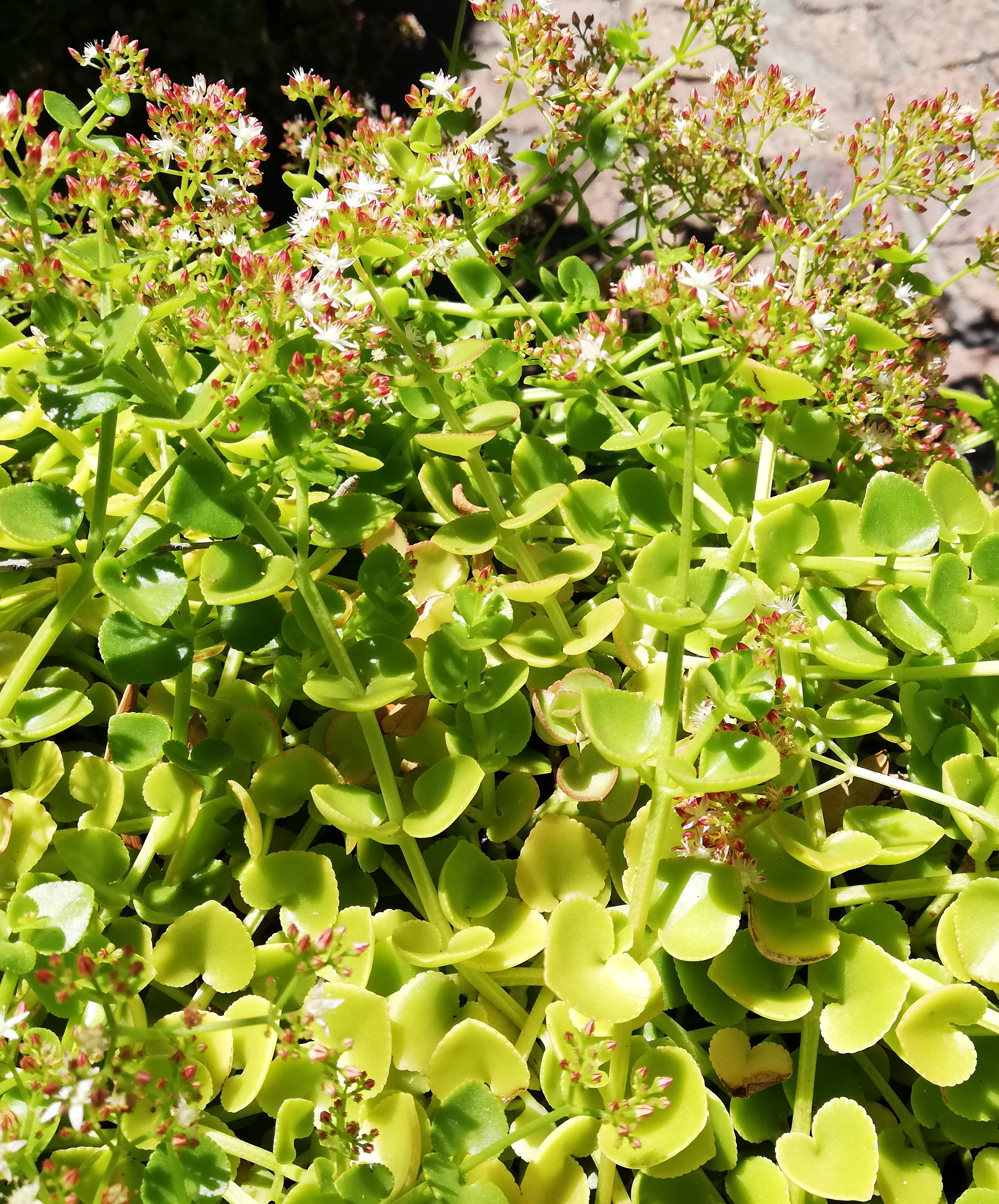
Detail of foliage and flowers

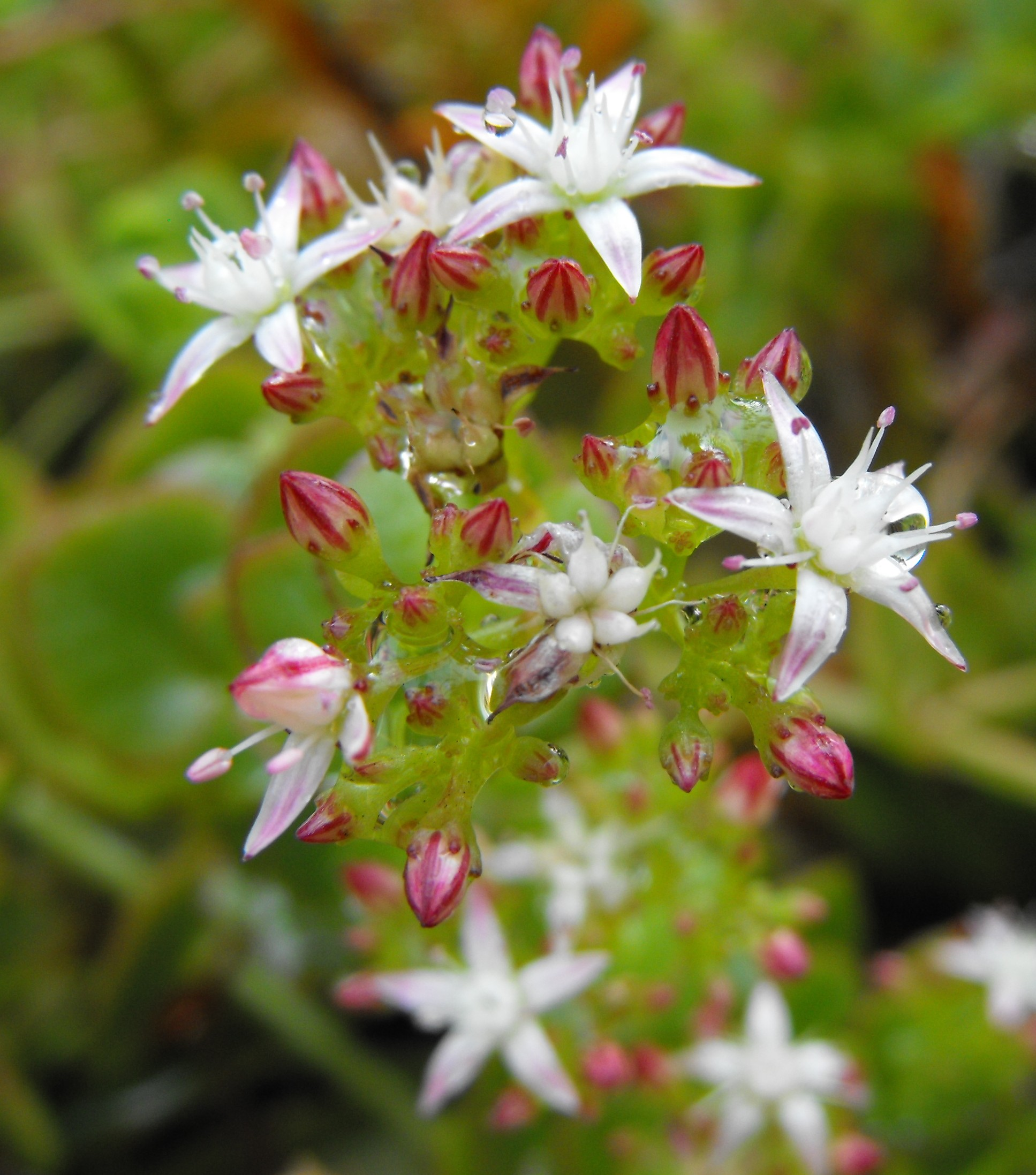
Flower detail

The small, ovate-rounded, spathula-shaped leaves have definite leaf-stalks (unlike the sessile leaves of Crassula pellucida). The base of each leaf is truncate or rounded (heart-shaped), and the leaves have rounded bumps along their edges.

The thin, prostrate stems of this species are sometimes square in cross-section.

Tiny pink-white, star-shaped flowers appear on branched flower stems in autumn.
