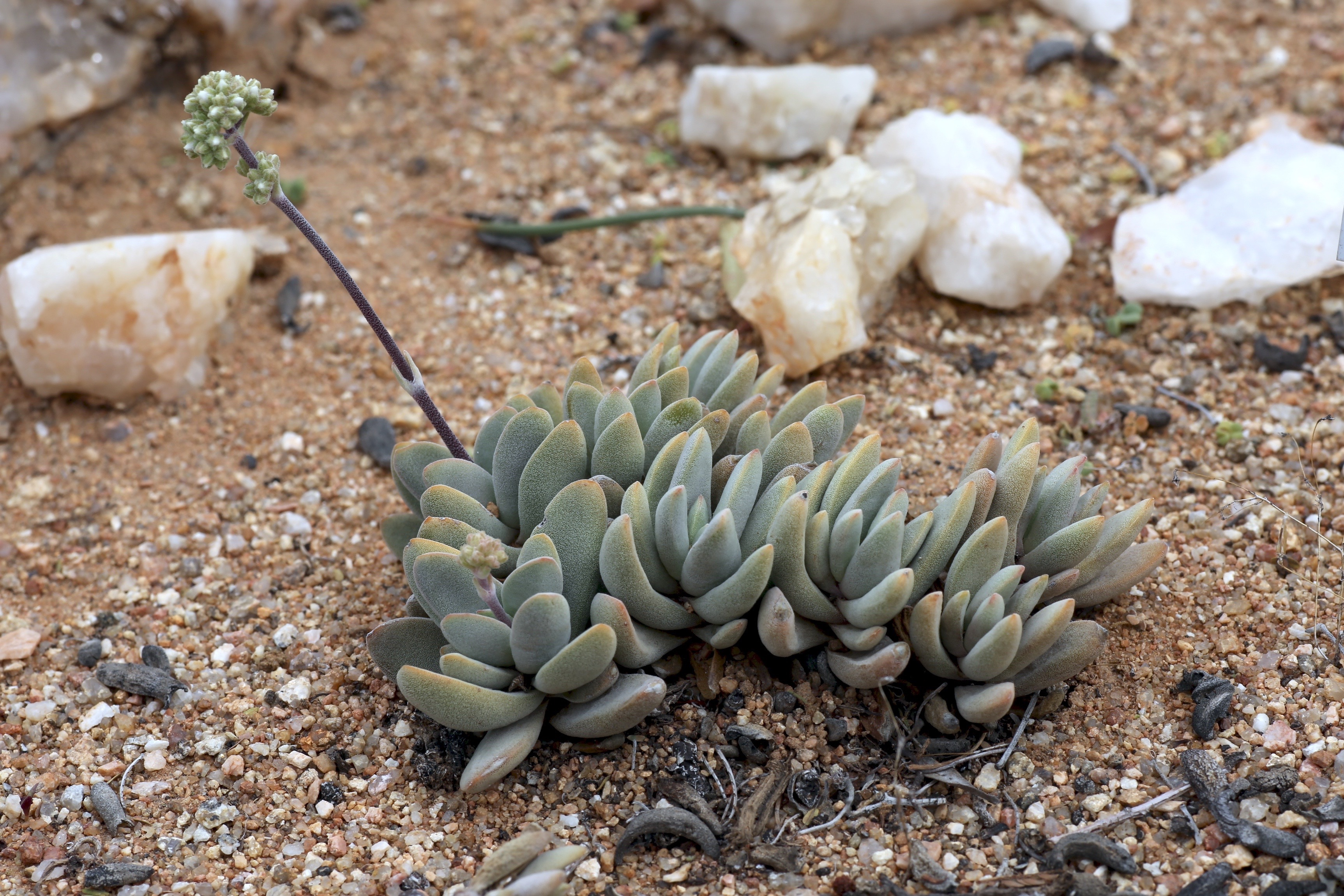

Scientific classification
- Kingdom: Plantae
- Clade: Tracheophytes
- Clade: Angiosperms
- Clade: Eudicots
- Order: Saxifragales
- Family: Crassulaceae
- Genus: Crassula
- Species: C. namaquensis

Binomial name
- Crassula namaquensis Schönland & Baker f.

= Crassula namaquensis =

Species of plant

Crassula namaquensis is a species of succulent plant in the genus Crassula native to South Africa. Easily confused with some forms of Crassula tecta and Crassula sericea, this species has rounded to elongated leaves that are usually blue, covered in fine hairs, and form clumps.

== Subspecies ==
There are three accepted subspecies.

- Crassula namaquensis subsp. comptonii
- Crassula namaquensis subsp. lutea
- Crassula namaquensis subsp. namaquensis
