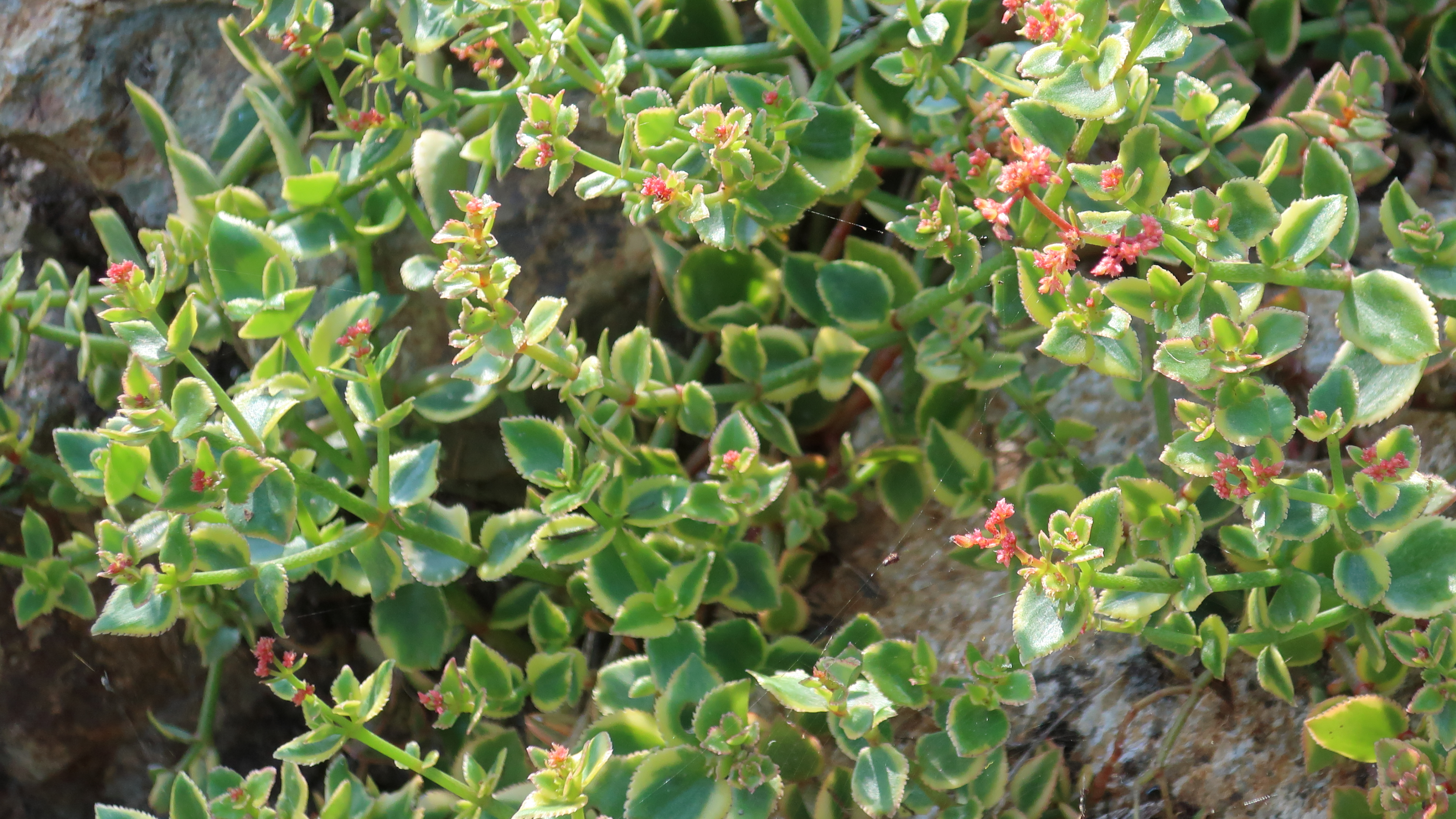
- Crassula sarmentosa variegeta

Scientific classification
- Kingdom: Plantae
- Clade: Tracheophytes
- Clade: Angiosperms
- Clade: Eudicots
- Order: Saxifragales
- Family: Crassulaceae
- Genus: Crassula
- Species: C. sarmentosa

Binomial name
- Crassula sarmentosa Harv., 1862

Synonyms
- Septimia sarmentosa (Harv.) P.V.Heath

= Crassula sarmentosa =

Trailing jade plant

Species of succulent

Crassula sarmentosa, commonly known as trailing jade plant and showy trailing jade, is a perennial succulent plant in the family Crassulaceae. It is native to southern Africa.

== Description ==
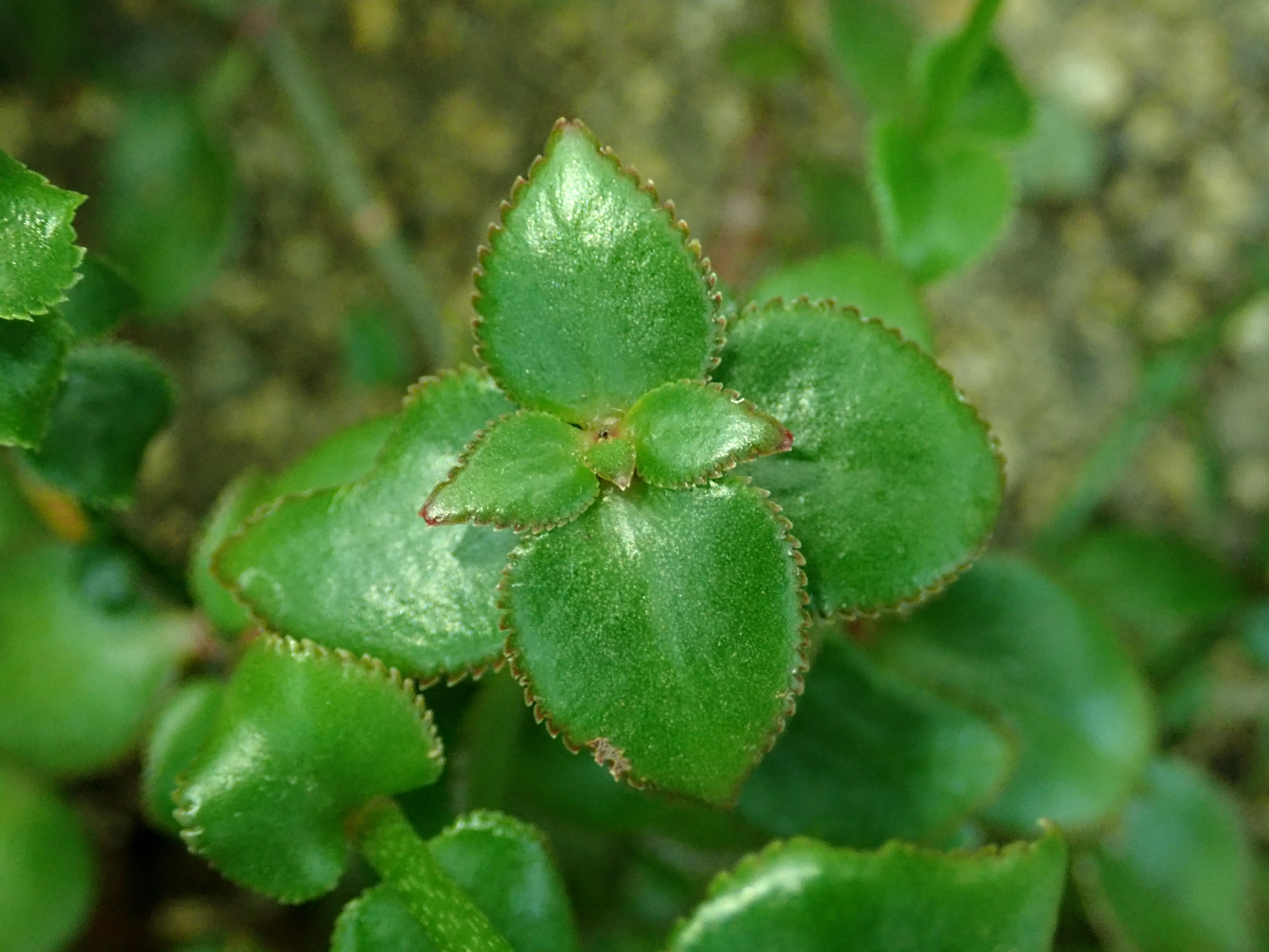
Green leaves with pale red edges

Featuring tubers, the plant is irregularly shaped at the base of the stem, where it produces several, long, trailing branches up to 1 meter long, which rarely branch and mainly emanate from the base. The plant forms a mat, and can send out runners or stolons, in addition to climbing or hanging from rocks.

The evergreen leaves may or may not have a petiole, up to 15 mm long, with a blade that varies from elliptic to ovate (usually ovate under the inflorescence and elliptic towards the base of the branches), acute or acuminate, more or less sharply tapering towards the petiole, with an entire or serrate margin, with the margin flattened in the dorsiventral direction, green or yellowish-green, often with a red edge. A variegated variety features green and cream striped leaves.

=== Inflorescence ===
The inflorescence, which appear in winter through to spring, is a thyrsus (stalked) with a rounded or flat top, on which the flowers are spread out at approximately right angles to each other. The calyx consists of linear-triangular petals 1-3 mm long, sharp, naked, fleshy, green. The corolla is stellate, barely fused at the base, white or cream, sometimes with a red tint. Stamens with anthers from white to pink.

== Distribution ==
Drought-tolerant, the plant is generally found on the east coast of South Africa, expanding from Knysna to the central parts of KwaZulu-Natal, usually in rocky areas, ravines or canyons, in full sun or part shade.
