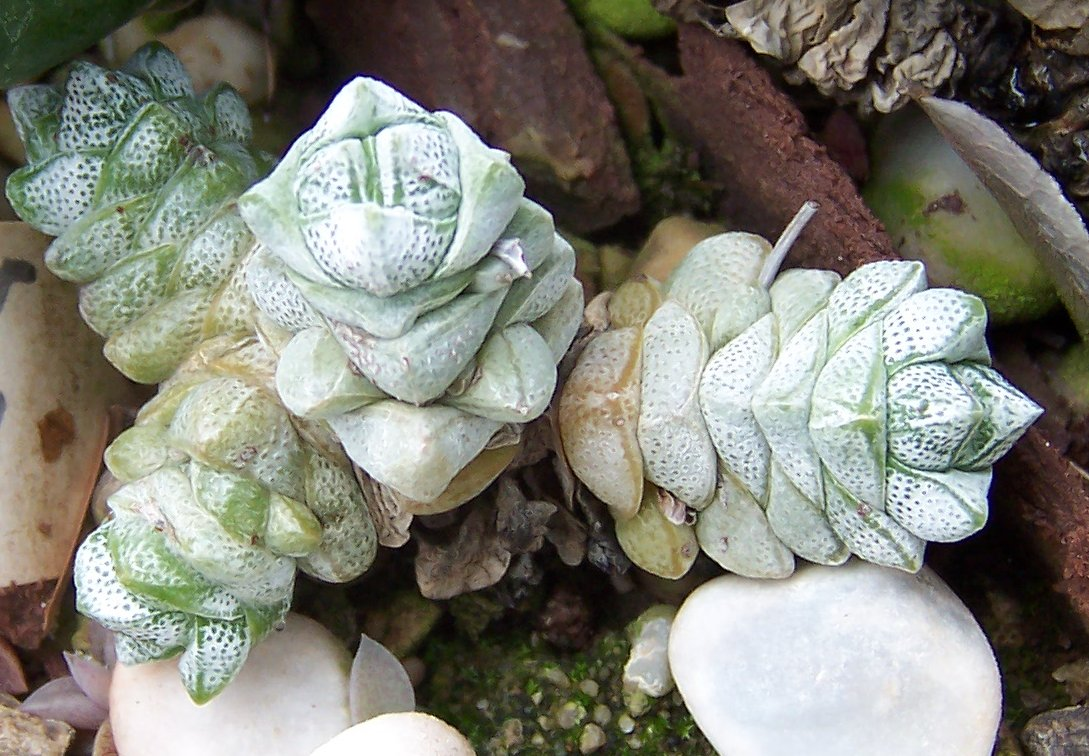

Scientific classification
- Kingdom: Plantae
- Clade: Tracheophytes
- Clade: Angiosperms
- Clade: Eudicots
- Order: Saxifragales
- Family: Crassulaceae
- Genus: Crassula
- Species: C. deceptor

Binomial name
- Crassula deceptor Schönl. and Baker f.

Synonyms
- Crassula arta Schönland; Crassula deceptrix Schönland; Crassula deltoidea Harv. (nom. illeg.)

= Crassula deceptor =

Species of succulent

Crassula deceptor is a succulent plant native to South Africa and Namibia. This species occurs from southern Namibia, to as far south as the town of Vanrhynsdorp in South Africa.

The leaves of this variable species are produced in four compact ranks, and have hard papillae.
