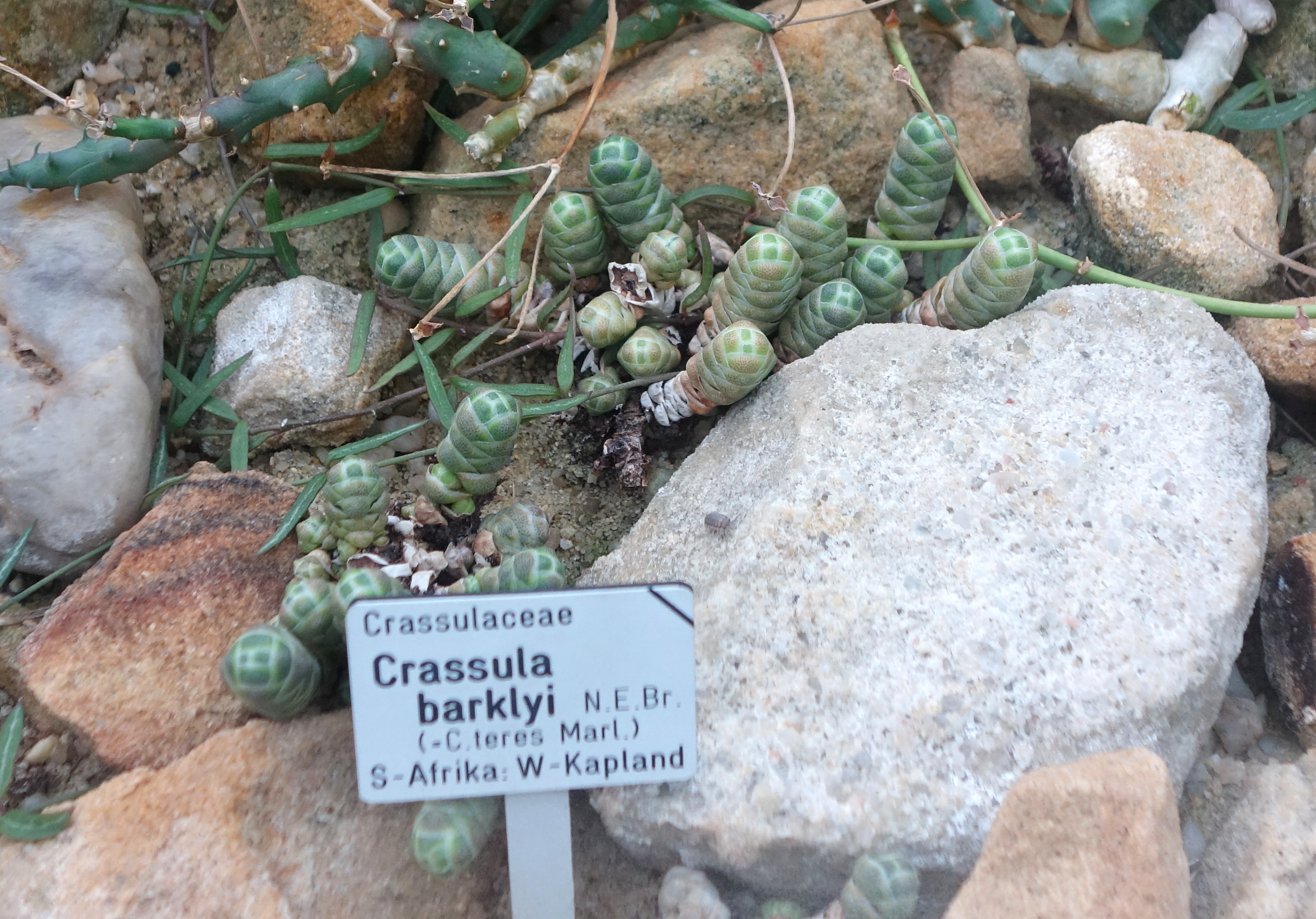

Scientific classification
- Kingdom: Plantae
- Clade: Tracheophytes
- Clade: Angiosperms
- Clade: Eudicots
- Order: Saxifragales
- Family: Crassulaceae
- Genus: Crassula
- Species: C. barklyi

Binomial name
- Crassula barklyi N.E.Br.

= Crassula barklyi =

Species of succulent

Rattlesnake tail (Crassula barklyi) is a perennial succulent plant native to Lesotho, Namibia, South Africa, and Eswatini.

== Synonyms ==
- Crassula teres Marloth
- Tetraphyle barklyi (N.E.Br.) P.V.Heath
