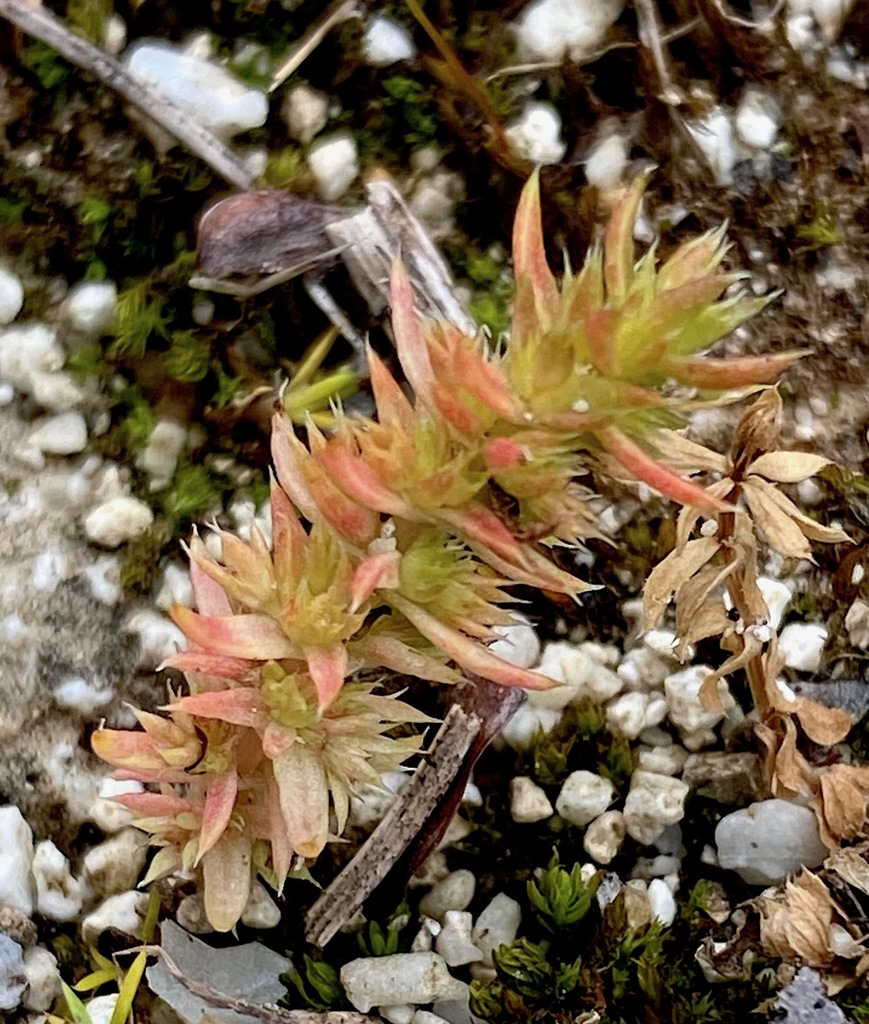

Scientific classification
- Kingdom: Plantae
- Clade: Tracheophytes
- Clade: Angiosperms
- Clade: Eudicots
- Order: Saxifragales
- Family: Crassulaceae
- Genus: Crassula
- Species: C. alata

Binomial name
- Crassula alata (Viv.) Berger

Synonyms
- Sedum confertum Delile; Tillaea alata Viv.

= Crassula alata =

Species of plant

Crassula alata is a herb in the family Crassulaceae. It is native to the Mediterranean basin and is now also found in southern Australia and New Zealand. The succulent annual herb typically grows to a height of 5 centimetres (2.0 in). It produces white flowers in the spring time between August and October in the Southern Hemisphere.

The species was first formally described as Crassula alata by the botanist Alwin Berger in 1930 as part of the Engler & Prantl work Die Naturlichen Pflanzenfamilien. Synonyms for the species include; Crassula tillaea as described by L.V.Lester-Garland in 1803 in the work A flora of the island of Jersey, Tillaea alata as described by Viviani in 1830 in the work Plantarum aegyptiarum and Crassula tripartita as described by N.A.Wakefield in 1957 in the work Flora of Victoria: new species and other additions published in The Victorian Naturalist.

It is an alien species to Western Australia but has become naturalised in many areas. The plant is commonly found in lawns and in and around carparks in the South West, Peel and Wheatbelt regions. It is also found in other states including coastal area in South Australia and Victoria.
