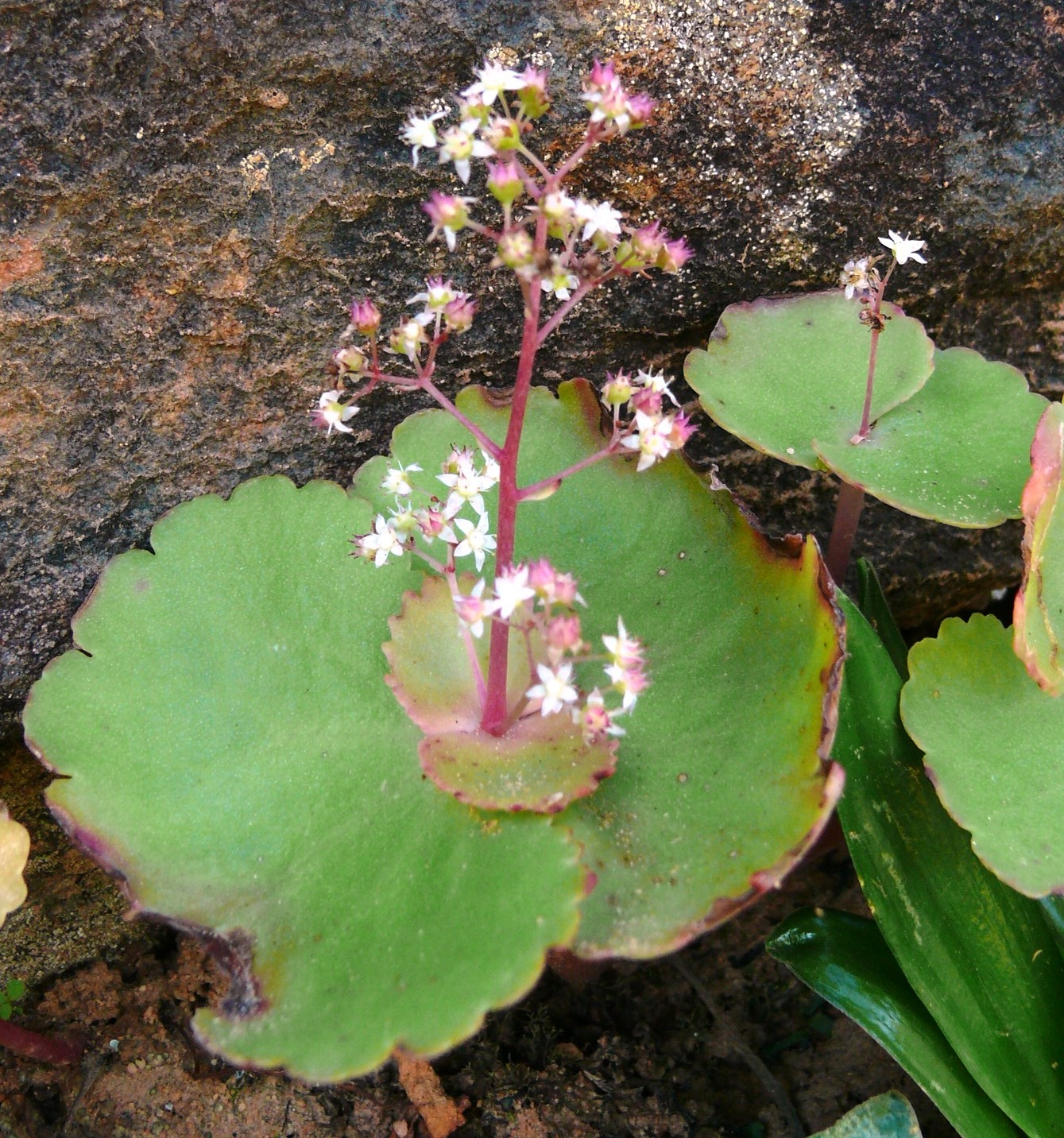

Conservation status
- Least Concern (SANBI Red List)

Scientific classification
- Kingdom: Plantae
- Clade: Tracheophytes
- Clade: Angiosperms
- Clade: Eudicots
- Order: Saxifragales
- Family: Crassulaceae
- Genus: Crassula
- Species: C. umbella

Binomial name
- Crassula umbella Jacq.

= Crassula umbella =

Succulent endemic to the Cape Provinces

Crassula umbella is a succulent plant species in the genus Crassula. It is endemic to the Cape Provinces of South Africa.

== Distribution ==
Crassula umbella is found from the Richtersveld and western Karoo through to the Little Karoo to Humansdorp.

== Conservation status ==
Crassula umbella is classified as Least Concern, as it is widespread and not in decline.
