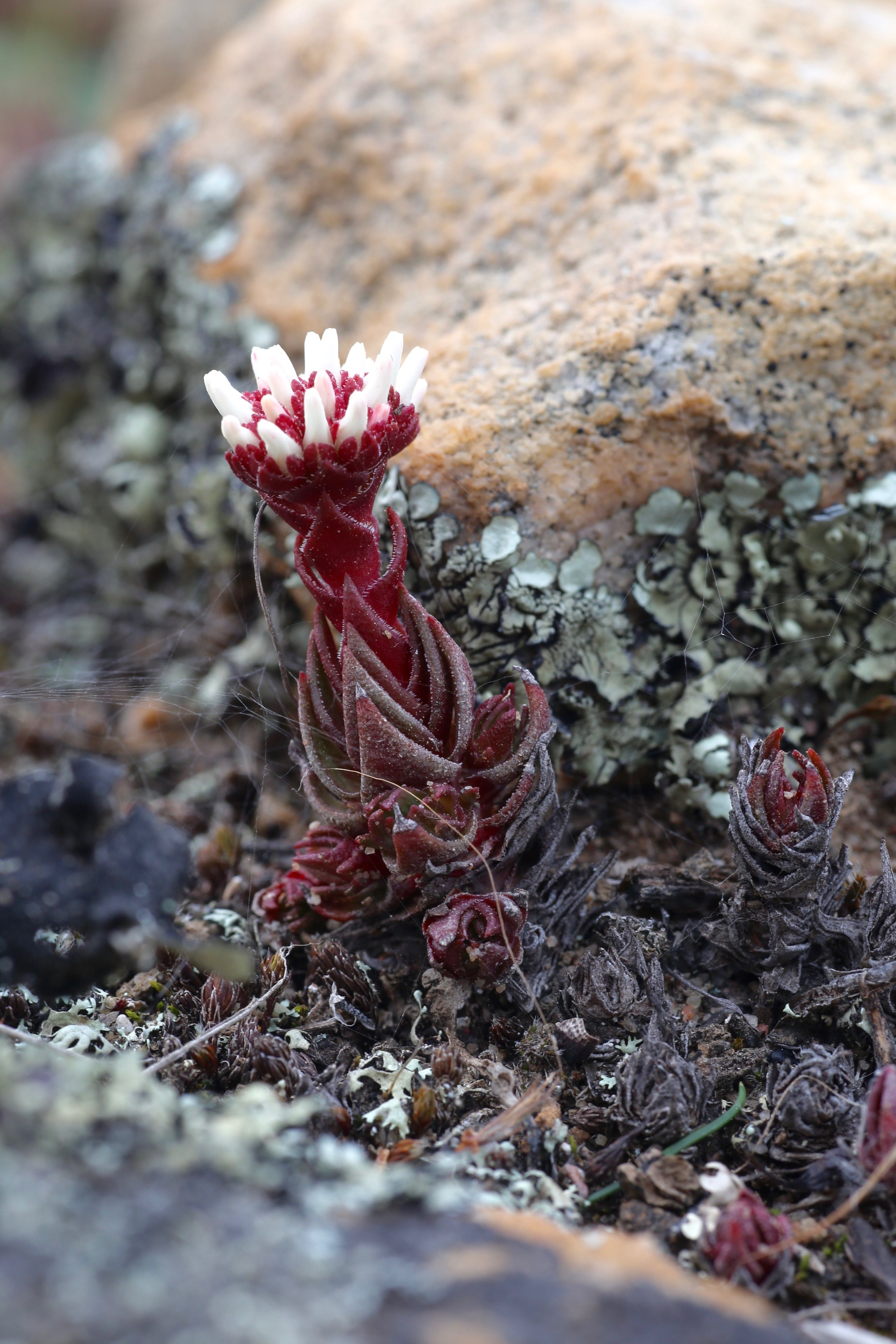
- Crassula alpestris subsp. alpestris

Scientific classification
- Kingdom: Plantae
- Clade: Tracheophytes
- Clade: Angiosperms
- Clade: Eudicots
- Order: Saxifragales
- Family: Crassulaceae
- Genus: Crassula
- Species: C. alpestris

Binomial name
- Crassula alpestris L.f.

= Crassula alpestris =

Species of succulent

Crassula alpestris, also known as the sand-coated crassula, is a species of flowering plant in the genus Crassula endemic to the Cape Provinces of South Africa. Crassula alpestris subsp. massonii is a variety of the species, also found in South Africa.

== Description ==
Crassula alpestris is perennial and grows up to 6 inches tall. The leaves are triangular and around 0.4 inches wide at the base. The flowers are white but sometimes have tints of pink or red.

== Growing ==
The plant is in UDSA hardiness zone 9b to 11b. Like many other species in the genus, Crassula alpestris is easily susceptible to bug and fungal diseases. Propagation can be done through offsets or leaf cuttings. Generally, full sun to partial shade is recommended and it needs little water and good draining.
