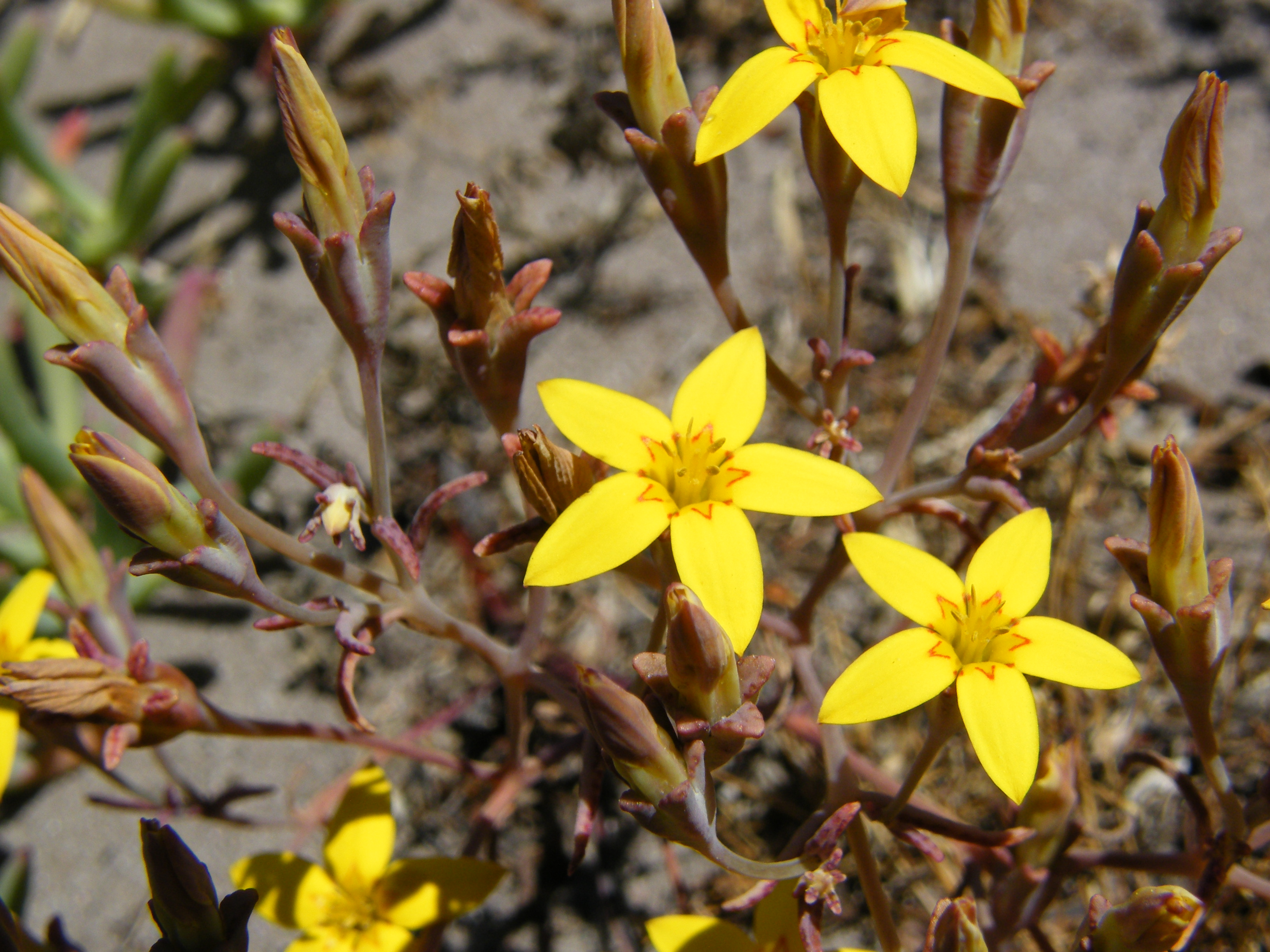

Conservation status
- Least Concern (SANBI Red List)

Scientific classification
- Kingdom: Plantae
- Clade: Embryophytes
- Clade: Tracheophytes
- Clade: Angiosperms
- Clade: Eudicots
- Order: Saxifragales
- Family: Crassulaceae
- Genus: Crassula
- Species: C. dichotoma

Binomial name
- Crassula dichotoma L.

= Crassula dichotoma =

Gold Stonecrop

Species of flowering plant endemic to South Africa

Crassula dichotoma, known as the gold stonecrop, is a species of succulent plant in the genus Crassula. It is endemic to the Fynbos region from Namaqualand to Agulhas in South Africa.
