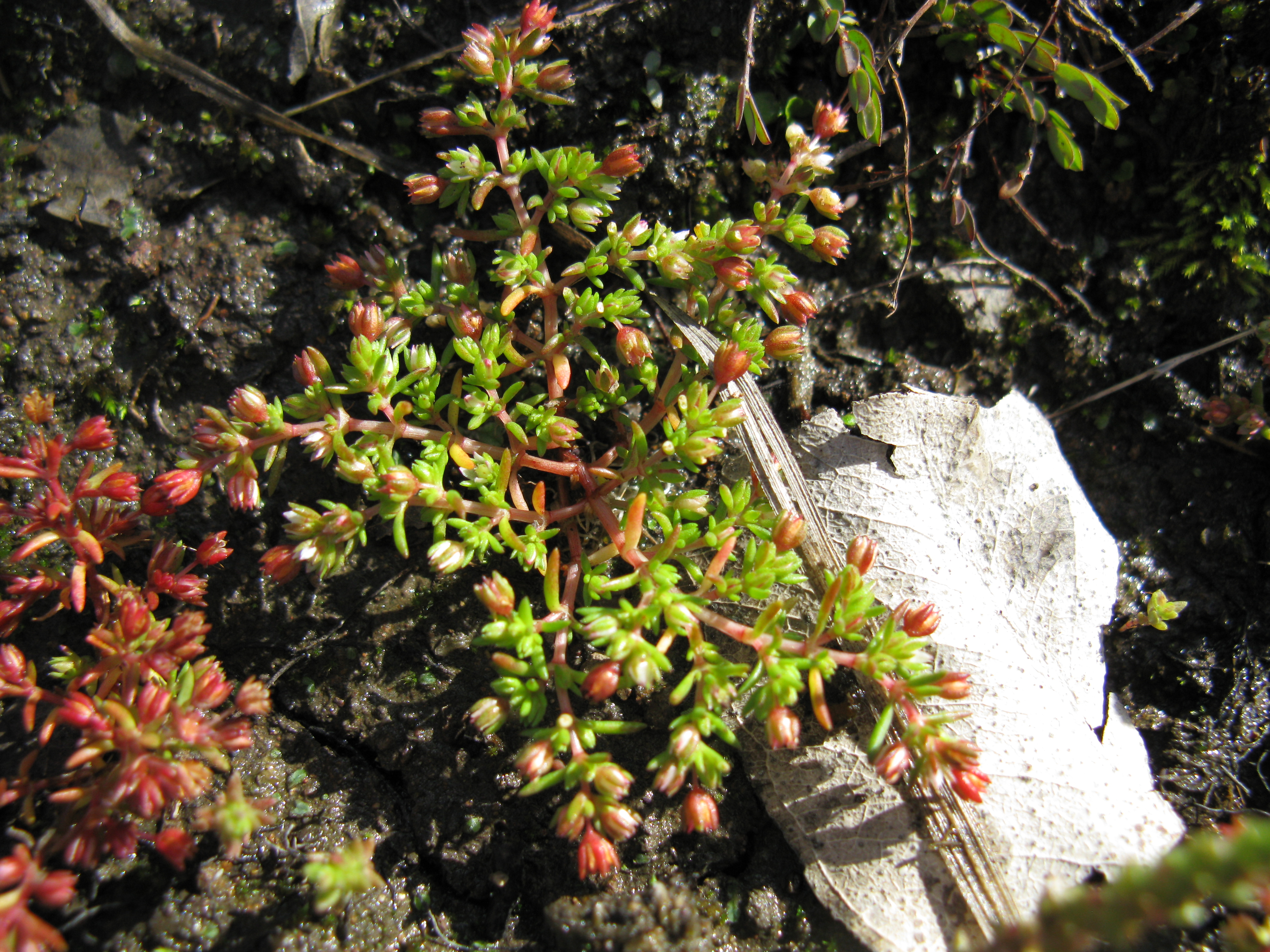
- Crassula decumbens

Scientific classification
- Kingdom: Plantae
- Clade: Tracheophytes
- Clade: Angiosperms
- Clade: Eudicots
- Order: Saxifragales
- Family: Crassulaceae
- Genus: Crassula
- Species: C. decumbens

Binomial name
- Crassula decumbens Thunb.

= Crassula decumbens =

Rufous stonecrop

Species of plant

Crassula decumbens, commonly known as rufous stonecrop, cape crassula or spreading crassula, is a herb in the family Crassulaceae that is native to southern parts of Australia, South Africa, and Chile. There are generally two accepted varieties: Crassula decumbens var. decumbens and C. decumbens var. brachyphylla.

The annual herb blooms between July and October producing cream-white-pink flowers. It has a decumbent habit or erect branches up to 15 centimetres (6 in) in length. The acute leaves have a linear-lanceolate to oblanceolate shape and the blade is typically 2.5 to 9 millimetres (0.10 to 0.35 in) long with a width of 0.4 to 1.5 mm (0.016 to 0.059 in). The axillary flowers are four merous with pedicels that are longer than sepals in fruiting material. The sepals are erect with a lanceolate shape and obtuse apex. Petals are striate and brown in colour and shorter than the sepals. The flower base is connate with a hooded apex and the stamens with anthers have an ovoid shape. It forms yellow seeds with a cylindrical-ovoid shape.

The species was first formally described as Crassula decumbens by Swedish botanist Carl Thunberg in 1794 in the work Prodromus Plantarum Capensium. Synonyms for the species include Tillaea trichotoma and Bulliarda trichotoma.

In Australia, it is commonly found on dune slopes in the Great Southern, Wheatbelt, Mid West and Goldfields-Esperance regions where it grows in clay-loam-sand soils. It is spread through much of Victoria and southeastern South Australia. It is also found in Tasmania and New Zealand. In addition to this, the species occurs throughout the Cape in South Africa and southern Chile, although has been introduced to other parts of the world too.
