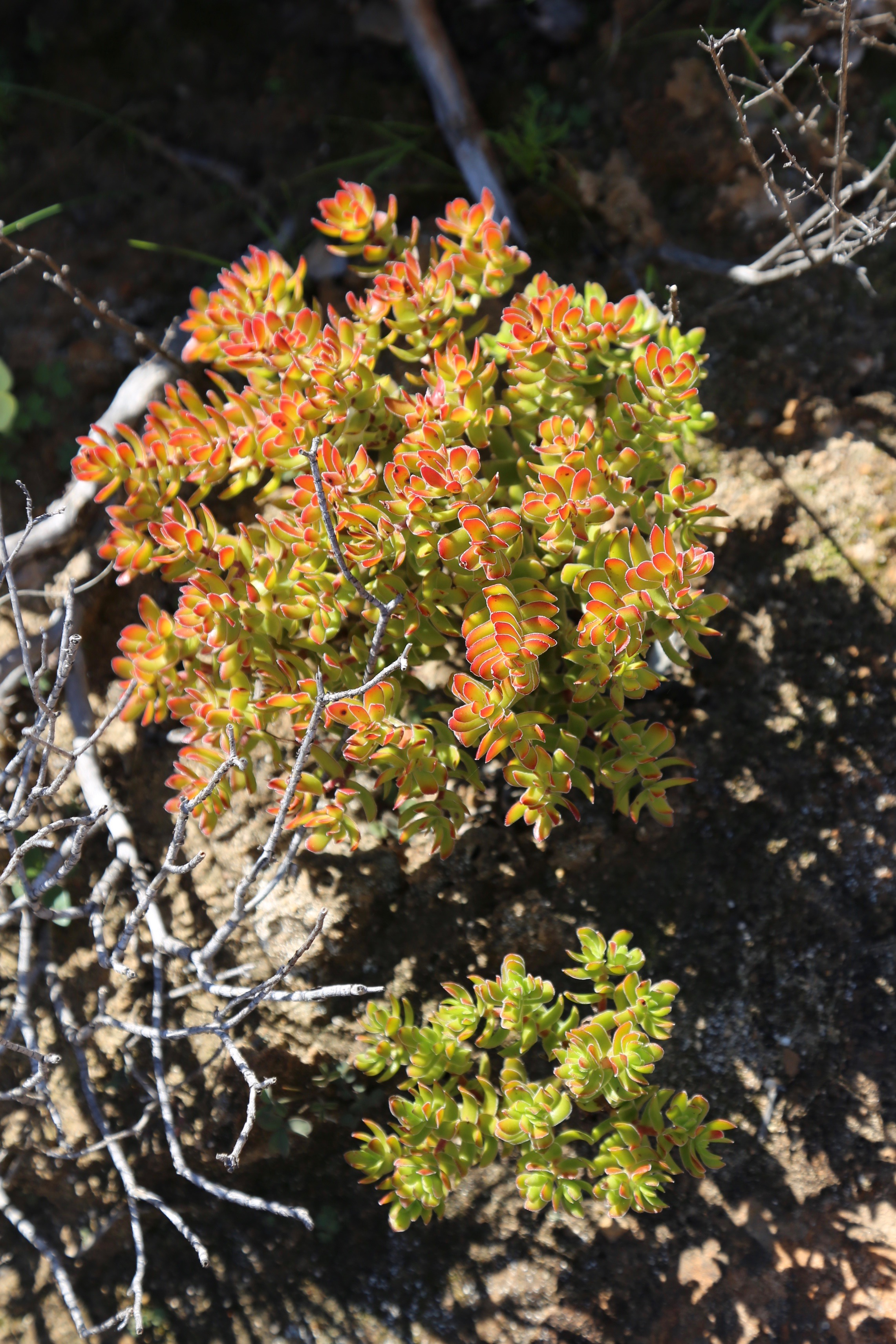
- Fynbos, South Africa

Scientific classification
- Kingdom: Plantae
- Clade: Embryophytes
- Clade: Tracheophytes
- Clade: Angiosperms
- Clade: Eudicots
- Order: Saxifragales
- Family: Crassulaceae
- Genus: Crassula
- Species: C. undulata

Binomial name
- Crassula undulata Haw.

Synonyms
- List: Curtogyne undulata (Haw.) Haw.; Rochea undulata (Haw.) Steud.; Crassula albiflora Sims; Crassula dejecta Jacq.; Curtogyne albiflora (Sims) Eckl. & Zeyh.; Curtogyne dejecta (Jacq.) DC.; Curtogyne undata Haw.; Curtogyne undosa Haw.; Rochea albiflora (Sims) DC.; Rochea dejecta (Jacq.) Steud.; Rochea undosa (Haw.) Steud.

= Crassula undulata =

Species of flowering plant

Crassula undulata, commonly known as doily crassula, is a species of succulent plant that is native to South Africa.

== Description ==
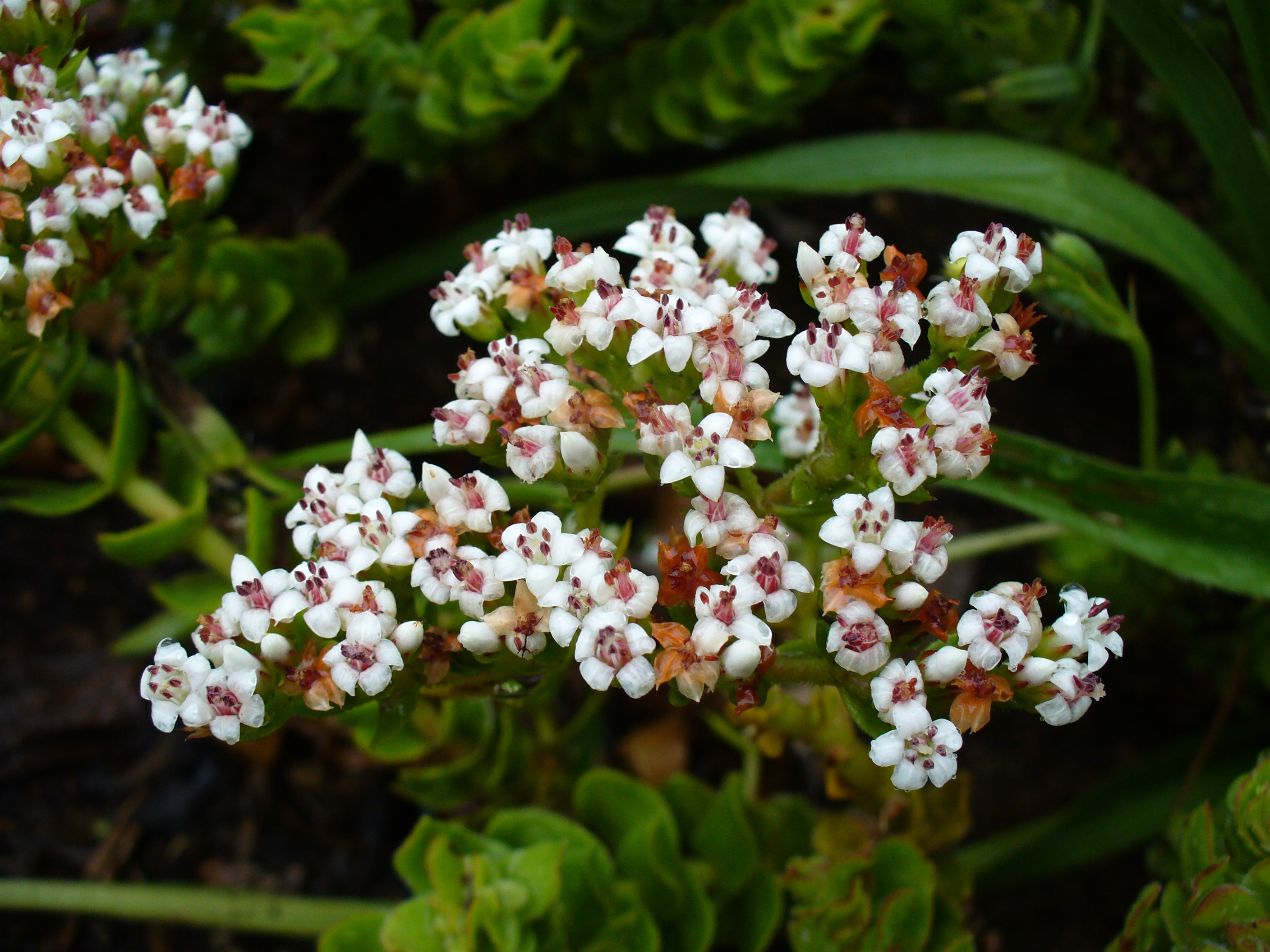
Flowers

It is a perennial plant that is densely branched and bushy, about 400 mm (16 in) high. The leaves are somewhat fleshy, frequently speckled with red hues. A line of rounded pearl-like hairs on the margins gives leaves a silvery edge. There are also small hairs that point downwards on the immature stems that feature a silvery tinge. The leaves are opposite, and are thickly ordered in regular rows on the stems.

=== Inflorescences ===
The flowers are white that tend to be hinted with pink or red sepals, with red ovaries coloring the center of the flowers, and red anthers that turn golden. The flowers are sorted in cloaked clusters, jammed at the branches' ends, with nectar that exudes a distinguishing scent. The flowers become small capsules (fruit), each comprising many very small seeds.

== Habitat ==
Crassula undulata grows on south or south-west facing slopes or in gorges, rock outcrops, ledges or rock crannies in the Riviersonderend Mountains adjacent to Stellenbosch in South Africa's Western Cape, which is northwards from the Cederberg mountains. The species is also present in Fynbos and the Succulent Karoo region.
