= List of Saxifragales of South Africa =

Flowering plants in the order Saxifragales recorded from South Africa

Saxifragales (saxifrages) is an order of flowering plants (Angiosperms). They are an extremely diverse group of plants which include trees, shrubs, perennial herbs, succulent and aquatic plants. The degree of diversity in terms of vegetative and floral features makes it difficult to define common features that unify the order.

In the Angiosperm Phylogeny Group classification system, the Saxifragales are placed within the major division of flowering plants referred to as eudicots, specifically the core eudicots. This subgroup consists of the Dilleniaceae, superasterids and superrosids. The superrosids in turn have two components, rosids and Saxifragales. The Saxifragales order has undergone considerable revision since its original classification based purely on plant morphology, to a classification based on molecular phylogenetics. There is an extensive fossil record from the Turonian-Campanian (late Cretaceous) time, about 90 million years ago (Myr), but molecular studies suggest an earlier origin in the early Cretaceous (102–108 Myr) with rapid early diversification to more modern forms.

The order Saxifragales consists of 15 families, about 100 genera and 2,470 species. Of the 15 families, many are small, with 8 having only a single genus, the largest family being the Crassulaceae (stonecrops) with about 35 genera. Saxifragales are found worldwide, though rarely in the tropics, and in a wide variety of habitats from desert to aquatic. They also have a wide variety of uses, from timber to foodstuffs and ornamental plants.

The anthophytes are a grouping of plant taxa bearing flower-like reproductive structures. They were formerly thought to be a clade comprising plants bearing flower-like structures. The group contained the angiosperms - the extant flowering plants, such as roses and grasses - as well as the Gnetales and the extinct Bennettitales.

23,420 species of vascular plant have been recorded in South Africa, making it the sixth most species-rich country in the world and the most species-rich country on the African continent. Of these, 153 species are considered to be threatened. Nine biomes have been described in South Africa: Fynbos, Succulent Karoo, desert, Nama Karoo, grassland, savanna, Albany thickets, the Indian Ocean coastal belt, and forests.

The 2018 South African National Biodiversity Institute's National Biodiversity Assessment plant checklist lists 35,130 taxa in the phyla Anthocerotophyta (hornworts (6)), Anthophyta (flowering plants (33534)), Bryophyta (mosses (685)), Cycadophyta (cycads (42)), Lycopodiophyta (Lycophytes(45)), Marchantiophyta (liverworts (376)), Pinophyta (conifers (33)), and Pteridophyta (cryptogams (408)).

Four families are represented in the literature. Listed taxa include species, subspecies, varieties, and forms as recorded, some of which have subsequently been allocated to other taxa as synonyms, in which cases the accepted taxon is appended to the listing. Multiple entries under alternative names reflect taxonomic revision over time.

== Altingiaceae ==
- Family: Altingiaceae,

=== Liquidambar ===
Genus Liquidambar:

- Liquidambar styraciflua L. not indigenous, cultivated, naturalised, invasive

== Crassulaceae ==
- Family: Crassulaceae,

=== Adromischus ===
Genus Adromischus:

- Adromischus alstonii (Schonland & Baker f.) C.A.Sm. indigenous
- Adromischus bicolor Hutchison, endemic
- Adromischus caryophyllaceus (Burm.f.) Lem. endemic
- Adromischus cooperi (Baker) A.Berger, endemic
- Adromischus cristatus (Haw.) Lem. endemic
  - Adromischus cristatus (Haw.) Lem. var. clavifolius (Haw.) Toelken, endemic
  - Adromischus cristatus (Haw.) Lem. var. cristatus, endemic
  - Adromischus cristatus (Haw.) Lem. var. mzimvubuensis Van Jaarsv. endemic
  - Adromischus cristatus (Haw.) Lem. var. schonlandii (E.Phillips) Toelken, endemic
  - Adromischus cristatus (Haw.) Lem. var. zeyheri (Harv.) Toelken, endemic
- Adromischus diabolicus Toelken, endemic
- Adromischus fallax Toelken, endemic
- Adromischus filicaulis (Eckl. & Zeyh.) C.A.Sm. indigenous
  - Adromischus filicaulis (Eckl. & Zeyh.) C.A.Sm. subsp. filicaulis, endemic
  - Adromischus filicaulis (Eckl. & Zeyh.) C.A.Sm. subsp. marlothii (Schonland) Toelken, endemic
- Adromischus hemisphaericus (L.) Lem. endemic
- Adromischus humilis (Marloth) Poelln. endemic
- Adromischus inamoenus Toelken, endemic
- Adromischus leucophyllus Uitewaal, endemic
- Adromischus liebenbergii Hutchison, endemic
  - Adromischus liebenbergii Hutchison subsp. liebenbergii, endemic
  - Adromischus liebenbergii Hutchison subsp. orientalis Van Jaarsv. endemic
- Adromischus maculatus (Salm-Dyck) Lem. endemic
- Adromischus mammillaris (L.f.) Lem. endemic
- Adromischus marianiae (Marloth) A.Berger, indigenous
  - Adromischus marianiae (Marloth) A.Berger var. hallii (Hutchison) Toelken, indigenous
  - Adromischus marianiae (Marloth) A.Berger var. immaculatus Uitewaal, endemic
  - Adromischus marianiae (Marloth) A.Berger var. kubusensis (Uitewaal) Toelken, indigenous
  - Adromischus marianiae (Marloth) A.Berger var. marianiae, endemic
- Adromischus maximus Hutchison, endemic
- Adromischus montium-klinghardtii (Dinter) A.Berger, indigenous
- Adromischus nanus (N.E.Br.) Poelln. endemic
- Adromischus phillipsiae (Marloth) Poelln. endemic
- Adromischus roaneanus Uitewaal, endemic
- Adromischus sphenophyllus C.A.Sm. endemic
- Adromischus subdistichus Makin ex Bruyns, endemic
- Adromischus subviridis Toelken, endemic
- Adromischus triflorus (L.f.) A.Berger, endemic
- Adromischus trigynus (Burch.) Poelln. indigenous
- Adromischus umbraticola C.A.Sm. endemic
  - Adromischus umbraticola C.A.Sm. subsp. ramosus Toelken, endemic
  - Adromischus umbraticola C.A.Sm. subsp. umbraticola, endemic

=== Aeonium ===
Genus Aeonium:

- Aeonium arboreum (L.) Webb & Berthel. not indigenous, cultivated, naturalised

=== Bryophyllum ===
Genus Bryophyllum:

- Bryophyllum delagoense (Eckl. & Zeyh.) Schinz, not indigenous, cultivated, naturalised, invasive
- Bryophyllum fedtschenkoi (Raym.-Hamet & Perr.) Lauz.-March. not indigenous, cultivated, naturalised
- Bryophyllum pinnatum (Lam.) Oken, not indigenous, cultivated, naturalised, invasive
- Bryophyllum proliferum Bowie ex Hook. not indigenous, cultivated, naturalised, invasive

=== Cotyledon ===
Genus Cotyledon:

- Cotyledon adscendens R.A.Dyer, endemic
- Cotyledon adscendens Van Jaarsv. & Eggli, accepted as Cotyledon xanthantha Van Jaarsv. & Eggli, endemic
- Cotyledon arborescens Mill. accepted as Crassula arborescens (Mill.) Willd. subsp. arborescens, indigenous
- Cotyledon barbeyi Schweinf. ex Baker, indigenous
  - Cotyledon barbeyi Schweinf. ex Baker var. soutpansbergensis Van Jaarsv. & A.E.van Wyk, endemic
- Cotyledon campanulata Marloth, endemic
- Cotyledon cuneata Thunb. endemic
- Cotyledon egglii Van Jaarsv. endemic
- Cotyledon eliseae Van Jaarsv. endemic
- Cotyledon gloeophylla Van Jaarsv. endemic
- Cotyledon lutea Van Jaarsv. accepted as Cotyledon xanthantha Van Jaarsv. & Eggli, endemic
- Cotyledon orbiculata L. indigenous
  - Cotyledon orbiculata L. var. dactylopsis Toelken, endemic
  - Cotyledon orbiculata L. var. flanaganii (Schonland & Baker f.) Toelken, endemic
  - Cotyledon orbiculata L. var. oblonga (Haw.) DC. indigenous
  - Cotyledon orbiculata L. var. orbiculata, indigenous
  - Cotyledon orbiculata L. var. spuria (L.) Toelken, endemic
- Cotyledon ovata Mill. accepted as Crassula ovata (Mill.) Druce, indigenous
- Cotyledon papillaris L.f. indigenous
- Cotyledon pendens Van Jaarsv. endemic
- Cotyledon petiolaris Van Jaarsv. endemic
- Cotyledon rhombifolia Haw. accepted as Adromischus rhombifolius (Haw.) Lem.
- Cotyledon tomentosa Harv. indigenous
  - Cotyledon tomentosa Harv. subsp. ladismithiensis (Poelln.) Toelken, endemic
  - Cotyledon tomentosa Harv. subsp. tomentosa, endemic
- Cotyledon velutina Hook.f. endemic
- Cotyledon woodii Schonland & Baker f. endemic
- Cotyledon xanthantha Van Jaarsv. & Eggli, endemic

=== Crassula ===
Genus Crassula:

- Crassula acinaciformis Schinz, indigenous
- Crassula alba Forssk. var. alba, indigenous
  - Crassula alba Forssk. var. pallida Toelken, indigenous
  - Crassula alba Forssk. var. parvisepala (Schonland) Toelken, indigenous
- Crassula alcicornis Schonland, endemic
- Crassula alpestris Thunb. indigenous
  - Crassula alpestris Thunb. subsp. alpestris, endemic
  - Crassula alpestris Thunb. subsp. massonii (Britten & Baker f.) Toelken, endemic
- Crassula alstonii Marloth, endemic
- Crassula ammophila Toelken, endemic
- Crassula aphylla Schonland & Baker f. endemic
- Crassula arborea Medik. accepted as Crassula arborescens (Mill.) Willd. subsp. arborescens, indigenous
- Crassula arborescens (Mill.) Willd. endemic
  - Crassula arborescens (Mill.) Willd. subsp. arborescens, endemic
  - Crassula arborescens (Mill.) Willd. subsp. undulatifolia Toelken, endemic
- Crassula argentea Thunb. accepted as Crassula ovata (Mill.) Druce, indigenous
- Crassula argyrophylla Diels ex Schonland & Baker f. accepted as Crassula swaziensis Schonland
- Crassula articulata Zuccagni, accepted as Crassula ovata (Mill.) Druce, indigenous
- Crassula atropurpurea (Haw.) D.Dietr. indigenous
  - Crassula atropurpurea (Haw.) D.Dietr. var. anomala (Schonland & Baker f.) Toelken, endemic
  - Crassula atropurpurea (Haw.) D.Dietr. var. atropurpurea, endemic
  - Crassula atropurpurea (Haw.) D.Dietr. var. cultriformis (Friedrich) Toelken, indigenous
  - Crassula atropurpurea (Haw.) D.Dietr. var. muirii (Schonland) R.Fern. endemic
  - Crassula atropurpurea (Haw.) D.Dietr. var. purcellii (Schonland) Toelken, endemic
  - Crassula atropurpurea (Haw.) D.Dietr. var. watermeyeri (Compton) Toelken, endemic
- Crassula badspoortense Van Jaarsv. endemic
- Crassula barbata Thunb. indigenous
  - Crassula barbata Thunb. subsp. barbata, endemic
  - Crassula barbata Thunb. subsp. broomii (Schonland) Toelken, endemic
- Crassula barklyi N.E.Br. endemic
- Crassula bergioides Harv. endemic
- Crassula biplanata Haw. endemic
- Crassula brachystachya Toelken, endemic
- Crassula brevifolia Harv. indigenous
  - Crassula brevifolia Harv. subsp. brevifolia, indigenous
  - Crassula brevifolia Harv. subsp. psammophila Toelken, endemic
- Crassula campestris (Eckl. & Zeyh.) Endl. ex Walp. indigenous
- Crassula capensis (L.) Baill. indigenous
  - Crassula capensis (L.) Baill. var. albertiniae (Schonland) Toelken, endemic
  - Crassula capensis (L.) Baill. var. capensis, endemic
  - Crassula capensis (L.) Baill. var. promontorii (Schonland & Baker f.) Toelken, endemic
- Crassula capitella Thunb. indigenous
  - Crassula capitella Thunb. subsp. capitella, endemic
  - Crassula capitella Thunb. subsp. enantiophylla (Baker f.) Toelken, accepted as Crassula capitella Thunb. subsp. nodulosa (Schonland) Toelken
  - Crassula capitella Thunb. subsp. meyeri (Harv.) Toelken, endemic
  - Crassula capitella Thunb. subsp. nodulosa (Schonland) Toelken, indigenous
  - Crassula capitella Thunb. subsp. sessilicymula (Mogg) Toelken, endemic
  - Crassula capitella Thunb. subsp. thyrsiflora (Thunb.) Toelken, indigenous
- Crassula ciliata L. endemic
- Crassula clavata N.E.Br. endemic
- Crassula coccinea L. endemic
- Crassula columella Marloth & Schonland, endemic
- Crassula columnaris Thunb. indigenous
  - Crassula columnaris Thunb. subsp. columnaris, endemic
  - Crassula columnaris Thunb. subsp. prolifera Friedrich, indigenous
- Crassula compacta Schonland, endemic
- Crassula congesta N.E.Br. indigenous
  - Crassula congesta N.E.Br. subsp. congesta, endemic
  - Crassula congesta N.E.Br. subsp. laticephala (Schonland) Toelken, endemic
- Crassula corallina Thunb. indigenous
  - Crassula corallina Thunb. subsp. corallina, indigenous
  - Crassula corallina Thunb. subsp. macrorrhiza Toelken, indigenous
- Crassula cordata Thunb. endemic
- Crassula cotyledon Jacq. accepted as Crassula arborescens (Mill.) Willd. subsp. arborescens, indigenous
- Crassula cotyledonifolia Salisb. accepted as Crassula arborescens (Mill.) Willd. subsp. arborescens, indigenous
- Crassula cotyledonis Thunb. indigenous
- Crassula cremnophila Van Jaarsv. & A.E.van Wyk, endemic
- Crassula crenulata Thunb. indigenous
- Crassula cultrata L. endemic
- Crassula cymbiformis Toelken, endemic
- Crassula cymosa P.J.Bergius, endemic
- Crassula deceptor Schonland & Baker f. indigenous
- Crassula decidua Schonland, endemic
- Crassula decumbens Thunb. indigenous
  - Crassula decumbens Thunb. var. brachyphylla (Adamson) Toelken, endemic
  - Crassula decumbens Thunb. var. decumbens, endemic
- Crassula deltoidea Thunb. indigenous
- Crassula dentata Thunb. endemic
- Crassula dependens Bolus, indigenous
- Crassula depressa (Eckl. & Zeyh.) Toelken, endemic
- Crassula dichotoma L. endemic
- Crassula dodii Schonland & Baker f. endemic
- Crassula elatinoides (Eckl. & Zeyh.) Friedrich, endemic
- Crassula elegans Schonland & Baker f. indigenous
- Crassula elegans Schonland & Baker f. subsp. elegans, indigenous
- Crassula elsieae Toelken, endemic
- Crassula ericoides Haw. indigenous
  - Crassula ericoides Haw. subsp. ericoides, endemic
  - Crassula ericoides Haw. subsp. tortuosa Toelken, endemic
- Crassula exilis Harv. indigenous
  - Crassula exilis Harv. subsp. cooperi (Regel) Toelken, endemic
  - Crassula exilis Harv. subsp. exilis, endemic
  - Crassula exilis Harv. subsp. picturata (Boom) G.D.Rowley, indigenous
  - Crassula exilis Harv. subsp. sedifolia (N.E.Br.) Toelken, indigenous
- Crassula expansa Dryand. indigenous
  - Crassula expansa Dryand. subsp. expansa, indigenous
  - Crassula expansa Dryand. subsp. filicaulis (Haw.) Toelken, endemic
  - Crassula expansa Dryand. subsp. fragilis (Baker) Toelken, indigenous
  - Crassula expansa Dryand. subsp. pyrifolia (Compton) Toelken, indigenous
- Crassula fallax Friedrich, endemic
- Crassula fascicularis Lam. endemic
- Crassula filiformis (Eckl. & Zeyh.) D.Dietr. endemic
- Crassula flanaganii Schonland & Baker f. endemic
- Crassula flava L. endemic
- Crassula foveata Van Jaarsv. indigenous
- Crassula fragarioides Van Jaarsv. & Helme, indigenous
- Crassula fusca Herre, indigenous
- Crassula garibina Marloth & Schonland, indigenous
  - Crassula garibina Marloth & Schonland subsp. garibina, indigenous
  - Crassula garibina Marloth & Schonland subsp. glabra Toelken, endemic
- Crassula gemmifera Friedrich, indigenous
- Crassula glomerata P.J.Bergius, endemic
- Crassula grammanthoides (Schonland) Toelken, endemic
- Crassula grisea Schonland, indigenous
- Crassula hemisphaerica Thunb. endemic
- Crassula hirsuta Schonland & Baker f. endemic
- Crassula hirta Thunb. var. dyeri Schonland, accepted as Crassula werneri N.Jacobsen, indigenous
- Crassula hirtipes Harv. endemic
- Crassula inandensis Schonland & Baker f. endemic
- Crassula inanis Thunb. indigenous
- Crassula intermedia Schonland, endemic
- Crassula lactea Sol. endemic
- Crassula lanceolata (Eckl. & Zeyh.) Endl. ex Walp. indigenous
  - Crassula lanceolata (Eckl. & Zeyh.) Endl. ex Walp. subsp. denticulata (Brenan) Toelken, indigenous
  - Crassula lanceolata (Eckl. & Zeyh.) Endl. ex Walp. subsp. lanceolata, indigenous
  - Crassula lanceolata (Eckl. & Zeyh.) Endl. ex Walp. subsp. transvaalensis (Kuntze) Toelken, indigenous
- Crassula lanuginosa Harv. indigenous
  - Crassula lanuginosa Harv. var. lanuginosa, indigenous
  - Crassula lanuginosa Harv. var. pachystemon (Schonland & Baker f.) Toelken, endemic
- Crassula lasiantha Drege ex Harv. endemic
- Crassula latibracteata Toelken, endemic
- Crassula lucens Gram, accepted as Crassula ovata (Mill.) Druce, indigenous
- Crassula macowaniana Schonland & Baker f. indigenous
- Crassula maputensis R.Fern. indigenous
- Crassula mesembrianthemopsis Dinter, indigenous
- Crassula mesembryanthemoides (Haw.) D.Dietr. indigenous
  - Crassula mesembryanthemoides (Haw.) D.Dietr. subsp. hispida (Haw.) Toelken, endemic
  - Crassula mesembryanthemoides (Haw.) D.Dietr. subsp. mesembryanthemoides, endemic
- Crassula minuta Toelken, endemic
- Crassula mollis Thunb. endemic
- Crassula montana Thunb. indigenous
  - Crassula montana Thunb. subsp. montana, endemic
  - Crassula montana Thunb. subsp. quadrangularis (Schonland) Toelken, endemic
- Crassula multicava Lem. indigenous
  - Crassula multicava Lem. subsp. floribunda Friedrich ex Toelken, endemic
  - Crassula multicava Lem. subsp. multicava, endemic
- Crassula multiceps Harv. endemic
- Crassula multiflora Schonland & Baker f. indigenous
  - Crassula multiflora Schonland & Baker f. subsp. leucantha (Schonland & Baker f.) Toelken, endemic
  - Crassula multiflora Schonland & Baker f. subsp. multiflora, endemic
- Crassula muricata Thunb. endemic
- Crassula muscosa L. indigenous
  - Crassula muscosa L. var. muscosa, indigenous
  - Crassula muscosa L. var. obtusifolia (Harv.) G.D.Rowley, indigenous
  - Crassula muscosa L. var. parvula (Eckl. & Zeyh.) Toelken, endemic
  - Crassula muscosa L. var. polpodacea (Eckl. & Zeyh.) G.D.Rowley, endemic
- Crassula namaquensis Schonland & Baker f. indigenous
  - Crassula namaquensis Schonland & Baker f. subsp. comptonii (Hutch. & Pillans) Toelken, endemic
  - Crassula namaquensis Schonland & Baker f. subsp. lutea (Schonland) Toelken, endemic
  - Crassula namaquensis Schonland & Baker f. subsp. namaquensis, indigenous
- Crassula natalensis Schonland, indigenous
- Crassula natans Thunb. indigenous
  - Crassula natans Thunb. var. minus (Eckl. & Zeyh.) G.D.Rowley, endemic
  - Crassula natans Thunb. var. natans, indigenous
- Crassula nemorosa (Eckl. & Zeyh.) Endl. ex Walp. indigenous
- Crassula nitida Schonland, accepted as Crassula ovata (Mill.) Druce, indigenous
- Crassula nodulosa Schonland var. nodulosa forma nodulosa, accepted as Crassula capitella Thunb. subsp. nodulosa (Schonland) Toelken, present
- Crassula nudicaulis L. indigenous
  - Crassula nudicaulis L. var. herrei (Friedrich) Toelken, endemic
  - Crassula nudicaulis L. var. nudicaulis, indigenous
  - Crassula nudicaulis L. var. platyphylla (Harv.) Toelken, endemic
- Crassula oblanceolata Schonland & Baker f. indigenous
- Crassula obliqua Sol. accepted as Crassula ovata (Mill.) Druce, indigenous
- Crassula obovata Haw. indigenous
  - Crassula obovata Haw. var. dregeana (Harv.) Toelken, endemic
  - Crassula obovata Haw. var. obovata, indigenous
- Crassula obtusa Haw. endemic
- Crassula orbicularis L. endemic
- Crassula ovata (Mill.) Druce, endemic
- Crassula pageae Toelken, endemic
- Crassula pallens Schonland & Baker f. indigenous
- Crassula papillosa Schonland & Baker f. endemic
- Crassula peculiaris (Toelken) Toelken & Wickens, endemic
- Crassula pellucida L. indigenous
  - Crassula pellucida L. subsp. alsinoides (Hook.f.) Toelken, indigenous
  - Crassula pellucida L. subsp. brachypetala (Drege ex Harv.) Toelken, indigenous
  - Crassula pellucida L. subsp. marginalis (Dryand.) Toelken, endemic
  - Crassula pellucida L. subsp. pellucida, endemic
  - Crassula pellucida L. subsp. spongiosa Toelken, endemic
- Crassula peploides Harv. indigenous
- Crassula perfoliata L. indigenous
  - Crassula perfoliata L. var. coccinea (Sweet) G.D.Rowley, endemic
  - Crassula perfoliata L. var. heterotricha (Schinz) Toelken, indigenous
  - Crassula perfoliata L. var. minor (Haw.) G.D.Rowley, endemic
  - Crassula perfoliata L. var. perfoliata, endemic
- Crassula perforata Thunb. indigenous
  - Crassula perforata Thunb. subsp. kougaensis Van Jaarsv. & A.E.van Wyk, indigenous
  - Crassula perforata Thunb. subsp. perforata, endemic
- Crassula picturata Boom, accepted as Crassula exilis Harv. subsp. picturata (Boom) G.D.Rowley, indigenous
- Crassula planifolia Schonland, endemic
- Crassula plegmatoides Friedrich, indigenous
- Crassula portulacaria L. accepted as Portulacaria afra Jacq. indigenous
- Crassula portulacea Lam. accepted as Crassula ovata (Mill.) Druce, indigenous
- Crassula pruinosa L. endemic
- Crassula pseudohemisphaerica Friedrich, indigenous
- Crassula pubescens Thunb. indigenous
  - Crassula pubescens Thunb. subsp. pubescens, endemic
  - Crassula pubescens Thunb. subsp. radicans (Haw.) Toelken, endemic
  - Crassula pubescens Thunb. subsp. rattrayi (Schonland & Baker f.) Toelken, endemic
- Crassula pustulata Toelken, endemic
- Crassula pyramidalis Thunb. endemic
- Crassula rogersii Schonland, endemic
- Crassula roggeveldii Schonland, endemic
- Crassula rotundifolia Haw. accepted as Kalanchoe rotundifolia (Haw.) Haw. indigenous
- Crassula rubricaulis Eckl. & Zeyh. endemic
- Crassula rudolfii Schonland & Baker f. endemic
- Crassula rupestris Thunb. indigenous
  - Crassula rupestris Thunb. subsp. commutata (Friedrich) Toelken, indigenous
  - Crassula rupestris Thunb. subsp. marnierana (H.E.Huber & H.Jacobsen) Toelken, endemic
  - Crassula rupestris Thunb. subsp. rupestris, endemic
- Crassula sarcocaulis Eckl. & Zeyh. indigenous
  - Crassula sarcocaulis Eckl. & Zeyh. subsp. rupicola Toelken, indigenous
  - Crassula sarcocaulis Eckl. & Zeyh. subsp. sarcocaulis, indigenous
  - Crassula sarmentosa Harv. indigenous
  - Crassula sarmentosa Harv. var. integrifolia Toelken, endemic
  - Crassula sarmentosa Harv. var. sarmentosa, endemic
- Crassula saxifraga Harv. endemic
- Crassula scabra L. endemic
- Crassula sebaeoides (Eckl. & Zeyh.) Toelken, endemic
- Crassula sediflora (Eckl. & Zeyh.) Endl. & Walp. indigenous
  - Crassula sediflora (Eckl. & Zeyh.) Endl. & Walp. var. amatolica (Schonland) Toelken, endemic
  - Crassula sediflora (Eckl. & Zeyh.) Endl. & Walp. var. sediflora, indigenous
- Crassula sericea Schonland, indigenous
  - Crassula sericea Schonland var. hottentotta (Marloth & Schonland) Toelken, indigenous
  - Crassula sericea Schonland var. sericea, indigenous
  - Crassula sericea Schonland var. velutina (Friedrich) Toelken, indigenous
- Crassula setulosa Harv. indigenous
  - Crassula setulosa Harv. var. deminuta (Diels) Toelken, endemic
  - Crassula setulosa Harv. var. jenkinsii Schonland, endemic
  - Crassula setulosa Harv. var. longiciliata Toelken, indigenous
  - Crassula setulosa Harv. var. rubra (N.E.Br.) G.D.Rowley, indigenous
  - Crassula setulosa Harv. var. setulosa forma setulosa, indigenous
- Crassula simulans Schonland, endemic
- Crassula sladenii Schonland, indigenous
- Crassula smithii Van Jaarsv. D.G.A.Styles & G.J.McDonald, indigenous
- Crassula socialis Schonland, endemic
- Crassula southii Schonland, indigenous
  - Crassula southii Schonland subsp. southii, endemic
  - Crassula southii Schonland subsp. sphaerocephala Toelken, endemic
- Crassula spathulata Thunb. endemic
- Crassula streyi Toelken, endemic
- Crassula strigosa L. endemic
- Crassula subacaulis Schonland & Baker f. indigenous
  - Crassula subacaulis Schonland & Baker f. subsp. erosula (N.E.Br.) Toelken, indigenous
  - Crassula subacaulis Schonland & Baker f. subsp. subacaulis, endemic
- Crassula subaphylla (Eckl. & Zeyh.) Harv. indigenous
  - Crassula subaphylla (Eckl. & Zeyh.) Harv. var. subaphylla, indigenous
  - Crassula subaphylla (Eckl. & Zeyh.) Harv. var. virgata (Harv.) Toelken, endemic
- Crassula subulata L. endemic
  - Crassula subulata L. var. fastigiata (Schonland) Toelken, endemic
  - Crassula subulata L. var. hispida Toelken, endemic
  - Crassula subulata L. var. subulata, endemic
- Crassula susannae Rauh & Friedrich, endemic
- Crassula swaziensis Schonland, indigenous
  - Crassula swaziensis Schonland var. swaziensis forma argyrophylla, accepted as Crassula swaziensis Schonland
  - Crassula swaziensis Schonland var. swaziensis forma swaziensis, accepted as Crassula swaziensis Schonland, present
- Crassula tabularis Dinter, indigenous
- Crassula tecta Thunb. endemic
- Crassula tenuicaulis Schonland, indigenous
- Crassula tenuipedicellata Schonland & Baker f. indigenous
- Crassula tetragona L. indigenous
  - Crassula tetragona L. subsp. acutifolia (Lam.) Toelken, endemic
  - Crassula tetragona L. subsp. connivens (Schonland) Toelken, endemic
  - Crassula tetragona L. subsp. lignescens Toelken, endemic
  - Crassula tetragona L. subsp. robusta (Toelken) Toelken, endemic
  - Crassula tetragona L. subsp. rudis (Schonland & Baker f.) Toelken, endemic
  - Crassula tetragona L. subsp. tetragona, endemic
- Crassula thunbergiana Schult. indigenous
  - Crassula thunbergiana Schult. subsp. minutiflora (Schonland & Baker f.) Toelken, indigenous
  - Crassula thunbergiana Schult. subsp. thunbergiana, endemic
- Crassula tomentosa Thunb. indigenous
  - Crassula tomentosa Thunb. var. glabrifolia (Harv.) G.D.Rowley, indigenous
  - Crassula tomentosa Thunb. var. tomentosa, indigenous
- Crassula tuberella Toelken, indigenous
- Crassula umbella Jacq. endemic
- Crassula umbellata Thunb. endemic
- Crassula umbraticola N.E.Br. indigenous
- Crassula undulata Haw. endemic
- Crassula vaginata Eckl. & Zeyh. indigenous
  - Crassula vaginata Eckl. & Zeyh. subsp. vaginata, indigenous
- Crassula vaillantii (Willd.) Roth, not indigenous, naturalised
- Crassula vestita Thunb. endemic
- Crassula werneri N.Jacobsen, endemic
- Crassula whiteheadii Harv. indigenous

=== Kalanchoe ===
Genus Kalanchoe:

- Kalanchoe alticola Compton, indigenous
- Kalanchoe beharensis Drake, not indigenous, cultivated, naturalised, invasive
- Kalanchoe brachyloba Welw. ex Britten, indigenous
- Kalanchoe crenata (Andrews) Haw. indigenous
  - Kalanchoe crenata (Andrews) Haw. subsp. crenata var. crenata, accepted as Kalanchoe crenata (Andrews) Haw. present
- Kalanchoe crundallii I.Verd. endemic
- Kalanchoe decumbens Compton, accepted as Kalanchoe rotundifolia (Haw.) Haw.
- Kalanchoe fedtschenkoi Raym.-Hamet & H.Perrier, not indigenous, naturalised
- Kalanchoe lanceolata (Forssk.) Pers. indigenous
- Kalanchoe leblanciae Raym.-Hamet, indigenous
- Kalanchoe longiflora Schltr. ex J.M.Wood, endemic
  - Kalanchoe longiflora Schltr. ex J.M.Wood var. coccinea Marn.-Lap. accepted as Kalanchoe sexangularis N.E.Br. var. sexangularis
- Kalanchoe luciae Raym.-Hamet, indigenous
  - Kalanchoe luciae Raym.-Hamet subsp. luciae, indigenous
  - Kalanchoe luciae Raym.-Hamet subsp. montana (Compton) Toelken, indigenous
- Kalanchoe mossambicana Resende ex Resende & Sobr. accepted as Kalanchoe sexangularis N.E.Br. var. sexangularis
- Kalanchoe neglecta Toelken, endemic
- Kalanchoe paniculata Harv. indigenous
- Kalanchoe praesidentis-vervoerdii Raym.-Hamet, accepted as Kalanchoe brachyloba Welw. ex Britten
- Kalanchoe rogersii Raym.-Hamet, accepted as Kalanchoe sexangularis N.E.Br. var. sexangularis, indigenous
- Kalanchoe rotundifolia (Haw.) Haw. indigenous
  - Kalanchoe rotundifolia (Haw.) Haw. forma peltata Raym.-Hamet ex R.Fern. accepted as Kalanchoe neglecta Toelken, indigenous
  - Kalanchoe rotundifolia (Haw.) Haw. forma tripartita Raym.-Hamet ex R.Fern. accepted as Kalanchoe rotundifolia (Haw.) Haw. indigenous
- Kalanchoe rubinea Toelken, accepted as Kalanchoe sexangularis N.E.Br. var. sexangularis, indigenous
- Kalanchoe sexangularis N.E.Br. indigenous
  - Kalanchoe sexangularis N.E.Br. var. sexangularis, indigenous
- Kalanchoe thyrsiflora Harv. indigenous
- Kalanchoe vatrinii Raym.-Hamet, accepted as Kalanchoe sexangularis N.E.Br. var. sexangularis
- Kalanchoe waterbergensis Van Jaarsv. endemic
- Kalanchoe winteri Gideon F.Sm. N.R.Crouch & Mich.Walters, endemic

=== Toelkenia ===
Genus Toelkenia:

- Toelkenia arborescens (Mill.) P.V.Heath, accepted as Crassula arborescens (Mill.) Willd. subsp. arborescens, indigenous
- Toelkenia lactea (Sol.) P.V.Heath, accepted as Crassula lactea Sol. indigenous
- Toelkenia ovata (Mill.) P.V.Heath, accepted as Crassula ovata (Mill.) Druce, indigenous

=== Tylecodon ===
Genus Tylecodon:

- Tylecodon albiflorus Bruyns, endemic
- Tylecodon atropurpureus Bruyns, endemic
- Tylecodon bayeri Van Jaarsv. endemic
- Tylecodon bleckiae G.Will. indigenous
- Tylecodon boddleyi Van Jaarsv. endemic
- Tylecodon buchholzianus (Schuldt & P.Stephan) Toelken, indigenous
  - Tylecodon buchholzianus (Schuldt & P.Stephan) Toelken subsp. buchholzianus, indigenous
  - Tylecodon buchholzianus (Schuldt & P.Stephan) Toelken subsp. fasciculatus G.Will. endemic
- Tylecodon cacalioides (L.f.) Toelken, endemic
- Tylecodon celatus Van Jaarsv. & Tribble, endemic
- Tylecodon cordiformis G.Will. endemic
- Tylecodon decipiens Toelken, endemic
- Tylecodon ellaphieae Van Jaarsv. endemic
- Tylecodon faucium (Poelln.) Toelken, endemic
- Tylecodon florentii Van Jaarsv. endemic
- Tylecodon fragilis (R.A.Dyer) Toelken, endemic
- Tylecodon grandiflorus (Burm.f.) Toelken, endemic
- Tylecodon hallii (Toelken) Toelken, indigenous
- Tylecodon hirtifolius (W.F.Barker) Toelken, endemic
- Tylecodon jarmilae Halda, accepted as Tylecodon ventricosus (Burm.f.) Toelken, present
- Tylecodon kritzingeri Van Jaarsv. endemic
- Tylecodon leucothrix (C.A.Sm.) Toelken, endemic
- Tylecodon longipes Van Jaarsv. & G.Will. endemic
- Tylecodon mallei G.Will. endemic
- Tylecodon nigricaulis G.Will. & Van Jaarsv. endemic
- Tylecodon nolteei Lavranos, endemic
- Tylecodon occultans (Toelken) Toelken, endemic
- Tylecodon opelii Van Jaarsv. & S.A.Hammer, endemic
- Tylecodon paniculatus (L.f.) Toelken, indigenous
- Tylecodon pearsonii (Schonland) Toelken, indigenous
- Tylecodon peculiaris Van Jaarsv. endemic
- Tylecodon petrophilus Van Jaarsv. & A.E.van Wyk, endemic
- Tylecodon pusillus Bruyns, endemic
- Tylecodon pygmaeus (W.F.Barker) Toelken, endemic
  - Tylecodon pygmaeus (W.F.Barker) Toelken var. tenuis (Toelken) Toelken, accepted as Tylecodon tenuis (Toelken) Bruyns, endemic
- Tylecodon racemosus (Harv.) Toelken, indigenous
- Tylecodon reticulatus (L.f.) Toelken, indigenous
  - Tylecodon reticulatus (L.f.) Toelken subsp. phyllopodium Toelken, indigenous
  - Tylecodon reticulatus (L.f.) Toelken subsp. reticulatus, indigenous
- Tylecodon rubrovenosus (Dinter) Toelken, indigenous
- Tylecodon scandens Van Jaarsv. accepted as Tylecodon tenuis (Toelken) Bruyns, present
- Tylecodon schaeferianus (Dinter) Toelken, indigenous
- Tylecodon similis (Toelken) Toelken, indigenous
- Tylecodon stenocaulis Bruyns, endemic
- Tylecodon striatus (Hutchison) Toelken, endemic
- Tylecodon suffultus Bruyns ex Toelken, endemic
- Tylecodon sulphureus (Toelken) Toelken, endemic
  - Tylecodon sulphureus (Toelken) Toelken var. armianus Van Jaarsv. endemic
  - Tylecodon sulphureus (Toelken) Toelken var. sulphureus, endemic
- Tylecodon tenuis (Toelken) Bruyns, endemic
- Tylecodon torulosus Toelken, endemic
- Tylecodon tribblei Van Jaarsv. endemic
- Tylecodon tuberosus Toelken, endemic
- Tylecodon ventricosus (Burm.f.) Toelken, endemic
- Tylecodon viridiflorus (Toelken) Toelken, endemic
- Tylecodon wallichii (Harv.) Toelken, indigenous
  - Tylecodon wallichii (Harv.) Toelken subsp. ecklonianus (Harv.) Toelken, indigenous
  - Tylecodon wallichii (Harv.) Toelken subsp. wallichii, endemic

== Haloragaceae ==
- Family: Haloragaceae,

=== Laurembergia ===
Genus Laurembergia:

- Laurembergia repens (L.) P.J.Bergius, indigenous
  - Laurembergia repens (L.) P.J.Bergius subsp. brachypoda (Welw. ex Hiern) Oberm. indigenous

=== Myriophyllum ===
Genus Myriophyllum:

- Myriophyllum aquaticum (Vell.) Verdc. not indigenous, naturalised, invasive
- Myriophyllum spicatum L. not indigenous, naturalised, invasive

== Hamamelidaceae ==
- Family: Hamamelidaceae,

=== Trichocladus ===
Genus Trichocladus:

- Trichocladus crinitus (Thunb.) Pers. endemic
- Trichocladus ellipticus Eckl. & Zeyh. indigenous
  - Trichocladus ellipticus Eckl. & Zeyh. subsp. ellipticus, endemic
- Trichocladus grandiflorus Oliv. indigenous
