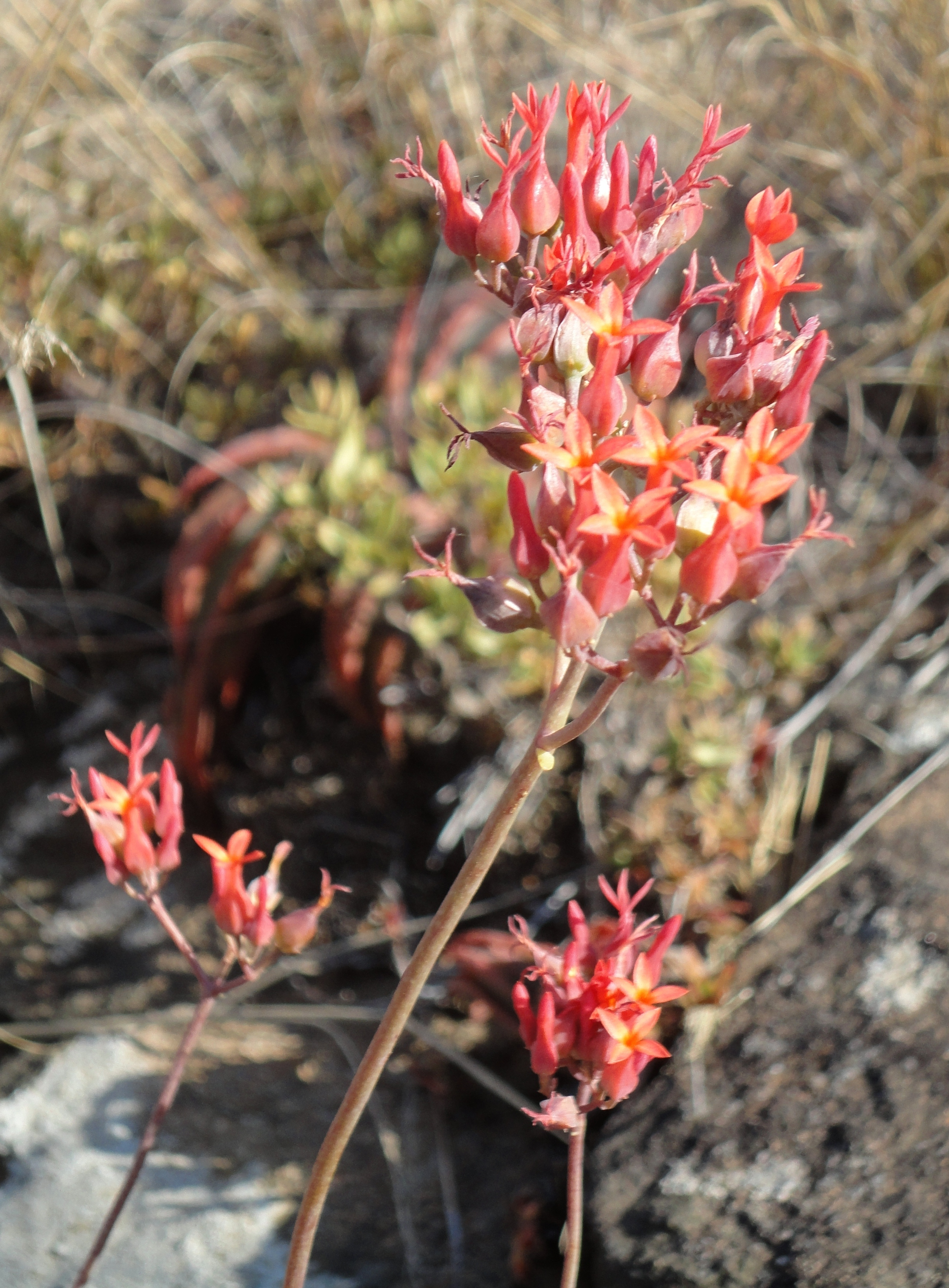

Scientific classification
- Kingdom: Plantae
- Clade: Embryophytes
- Clade: Tracheophytes
- Clade: Angiosperms
- Clade: Eudicots
- Order: Saxifragales
- Family: Crassulaceae
- Genus: Kalanchoe
- Species: K. rotundifolia

Binomial name
- Kalanchoe rotundifolia (Haw.) Haw.

Synonyms
- Crassula rotundifolia Haw.; Sedum subrotundifolium (Haw.) Kuntze; Vereia rotundifolia (Haw.) D.Dietr.; Kalanchoe guillauminii Raym.-Hamet; Kalanchoe integerrima Lange; Kalanchoe luebbertiana Engl.; Kalanchoe rotundifolia var. guillauminii (Raym.-Hamet) Raym.-Hamet; Kalanchoe rotundifolia f. tripartita R.Fern.; Kalanchoe seilleana Raym.-Hamet; Meristostylus brachycalyx Klotzsch

= Kalanchoe rotundifolia =

Species of flowering plant

Kalanchoe rotundifolia, commonly known as common kalanchoe, is a species of flowering plant in the family Crassulaceae. It is a succulent annual or subshrub with orange-red flowers. The species is native to southern Africa and Socotra, and was described in 1824.

== Taxonomy ==
In 1824, Adrian Hardy Haworth described Crassula rotundifolia. In 1825, he moved it from Crassula to Kalanchoe.

== Distribution ==
Kalanchoe rotundifolia is native to the seasonally dry tropical biomes of Botswana, South Africa (Eastern Cape, Free State, Gauteng, KwaZulu-Natal, Limpopo, Mpumalanga, Northern Cape, North West), Eswatini, Mozambique, Namibia, Yemen (Socotra), Tanzania, and Zimbabwe.

The species grows under trees, in full or partial shade. It is present in grasslands, savannas, the Indian Ocean coastal belt, and bushveld environments.

== Description ==
Kalanchoe rotundifolia is a succulent annual or subshrub. It grows 0.2–2 metres (0.66–6.56 ft) high, and is covered with waxy material. The leaves are oblong to oblong-lanceolate, spoon-shaped, or triangular, 2.5–4 centimetres (0.98–1.57 in) long, and 1.5–2.5 centimetres (0.59–0.98 in) wide. The margins are smooth or have rounded teeth. The leaf stems are 0.3–1.2 centimetres (0.12–0.47 in) long.

The inflorescence is a panicle that grows up to 20 centimetres (7.9 in) long. The inflorescence stem is 2–5 millimetres (0.079–0.197 in) long. The corolla is a 7–10 millimetres (0.28–0.39 in) long tube, that can be up to 4 millimetres (0.16 in) wide. The corolla tube is orange-red and greenish-yellow at the bottom. The corolla has lanceolate or elliptical lobes, which are 4–5 millimetres (0.16–0.20 in) long, and 1.5–2 millimetres (0.059–0.079 in) wide. The calyx lobes are lanceolate or triangular, 1–2 millimetres (0.039–0.079 in) long, and 0.8–1.1 millimetres (0.031–0.043 in) wide. The plant flowers from March to August.

The seeds are around 1 millimetre (0.039 in) long.

== Ecology ==
Kalanchoe rotundifolia is parasitised by Metaphycus nigripectus, a species of wasp.

Kalanchoe rotundifolia hybridises with Kalanchoe longiflora, forming the nothospecies Kalanchoe ×robertsonii.

== Nomenclature ==
English common names for Kalanchoe rotundifolia are "Common Kalanchoe" and "Nentakalanchoe".

In Afrikaans, the species is known as nentabos or plakkie. In Tswana, the species is known as Sereledi. In Venda, it is known as nethi. In Xhosa, it is known as mfayisele yasehlatini. In the Zulu language, it is known as umadinsane, uchane, or idambisa.
