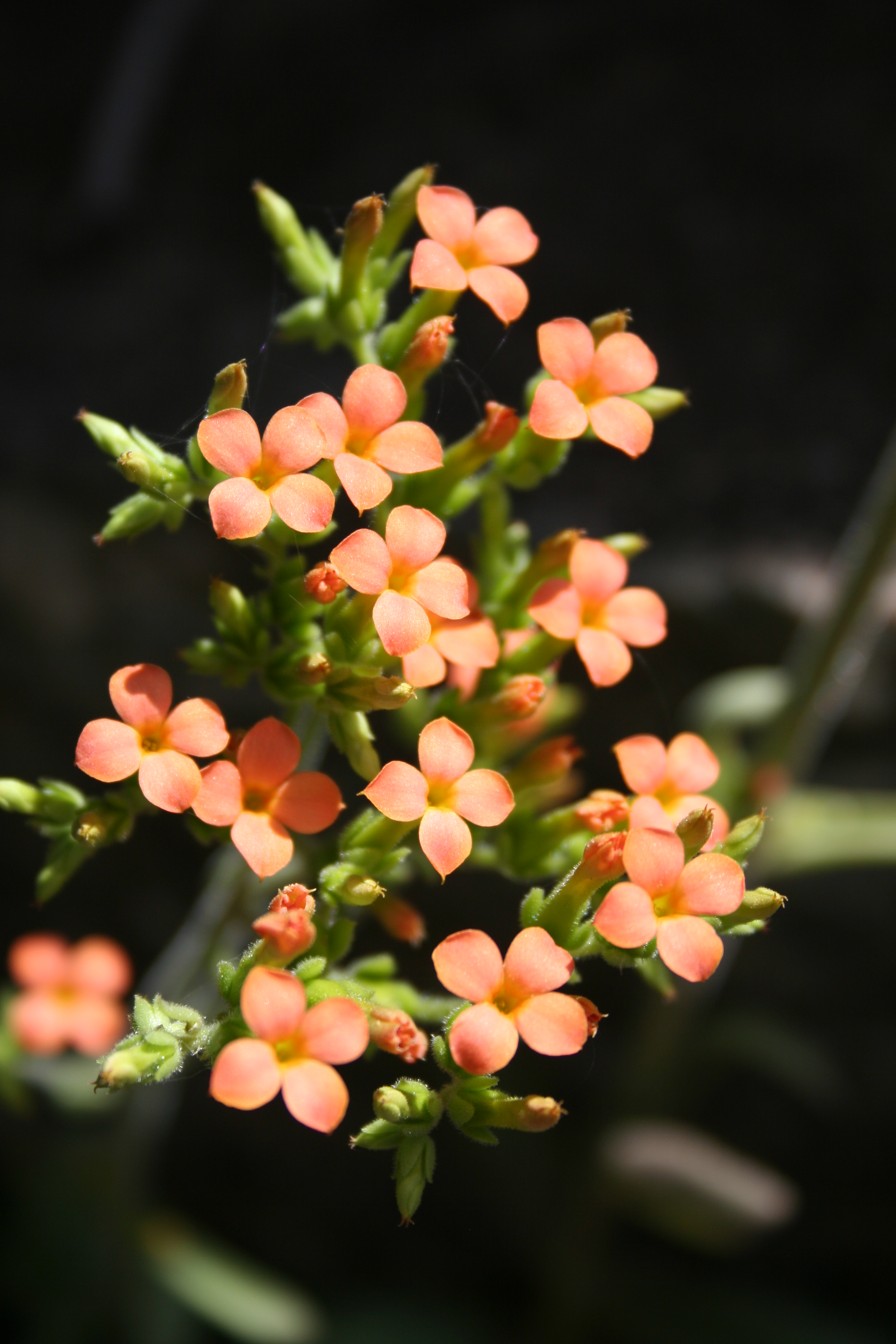

Scientific classification
- Kingdom: Plantae
- Clade: Tracheophytes
- Clade: Angiosperms
- Clade: Eudicots
- Order: Saxifragales
- Family: Crassulaceae
- Genus: Kalanchoe
- Species: K. crenata

Binomial name
- Kalanchoe crenata (Andrews) Haw.

Synonyms
- Synonymy: Cotyledon crenata (Andrews) Vent.; Cotyledon verea Jacq.; Kalanchoe afzeliana Britten; Kalanchoe crenata var. verea Cufod.; Kalanchoe integra var. crenata (Andrews) Cufod.; Kalanchoe integra var. varea Cufod.; Kalanchoe verea Pers.; Vereia crenata Andrews; Cotyledon brasilica Vell.; Cotyledon nudicaulis Lam.; Kalanchoe brasilica (Vell.) Stellfeld; Kalanchoe brasiliensis Cambess.; Kalanchoe brittenii Raym.-Hamet; Kalanchoe coccinea Welw. ex Britten; Kalanchoe connata Sprague; Kalanchoe crenata subsp. bieensis R.Fern.; Kalanchoe crenata var. coccinea (Welw. ex Britten) Cufod.; Kalanchoe crenata subsp. nyassensis R.Fern.; Kalanchoe integra var. crenatorubra Cufod.; Vereia nudicaulis (Lam.) Spreng.

= Kalanchoe crenata =

Species of flowering plant

Kalanchoe crenata is a species of flowering plant in the family Crassulaceae. It is a perennial with yellow or orange flowers. The species is native to Africa and the Arabian Peninsula, and was described in 1798.

== Taxonomy ==
Henry Cranke Andrews described the species in 1798, and placed it in the genus Vereia. In 1812, Adrian Hardy Haworth placed it in the genus Kalanchoe.

== Distribution ==
Kalanchoe crenata is native to Angola, Benin, Botswana, Burkina Faso, Burundi, Cameroon, South Africa (Cape Provinces and KwaZulu-Natal), the Central African Republic, Chad, the Democratic Republic of the Congo, the Republic of the Congo, Gabon, Ghana, Guinea, Guinea-Bissau, islands in the Gulf of Guinea, Ivory Coast, Kenya, Malawi, Mali, Mozambique, Niger, Nigeria, Rwanda, Sierra Leone, Tanzania, Uganda, Zambia, Zimbabwe, Saudi Arabia and Yemen. It has been introduced to the Bahamas, Bangladesh, Bermuda, Brazil, Cuba, the Dominican Republic, El Salvador, Florida, Guatemala, the Leeward Islands, Puerto Rico, and Vietnam. The species mainly grows in seasonally dry tropical areas.

The species grows in sunny places at the edges of forests, and by roadsides and streams. It is present at elevations of 1,600–2,850 metres (5,250–9,350 ft).

== Description ==
Kalanchoe crenata is a perennial succulent subshrub or epiphyte. It grows 0.3–2 centimetres (0.12–0.79 in) high. The leaves are yellowish-green, ovate to oblong, 4–11 centimetres (1.6–4.3 in) long, and 3–9 centimetres (1.2–3.5 in) wide. The leaf stems are 1–3 centimetres (0.39–1.18 in) long.

The inflorescence is a rounded thyrse. The corolla is a yellow or orange tube, measuring 1–1.2 centimetres (0.39–0.47 in) long. The corolla has orange lobes, which are 3–5 millimetres (0.12–0.20 in) long, and 1.5–4 millimetres (0.059–0.157 in) wide. The calyx has narrowly triangular to ovate lobes, which are 3–5 millimetres (0.12–0.20 in) long. The plant flowers from August to October.

The seeds are around 1 millimetre (0.039 in) long.

== Uses ==
Kalanchoe crenata is used in medicine, and has environmental and social uses.

== Nomenclature ==
In English, Kalanchoe crenata is commonly known as "scalloped kalanchoe" or "neverdie".
