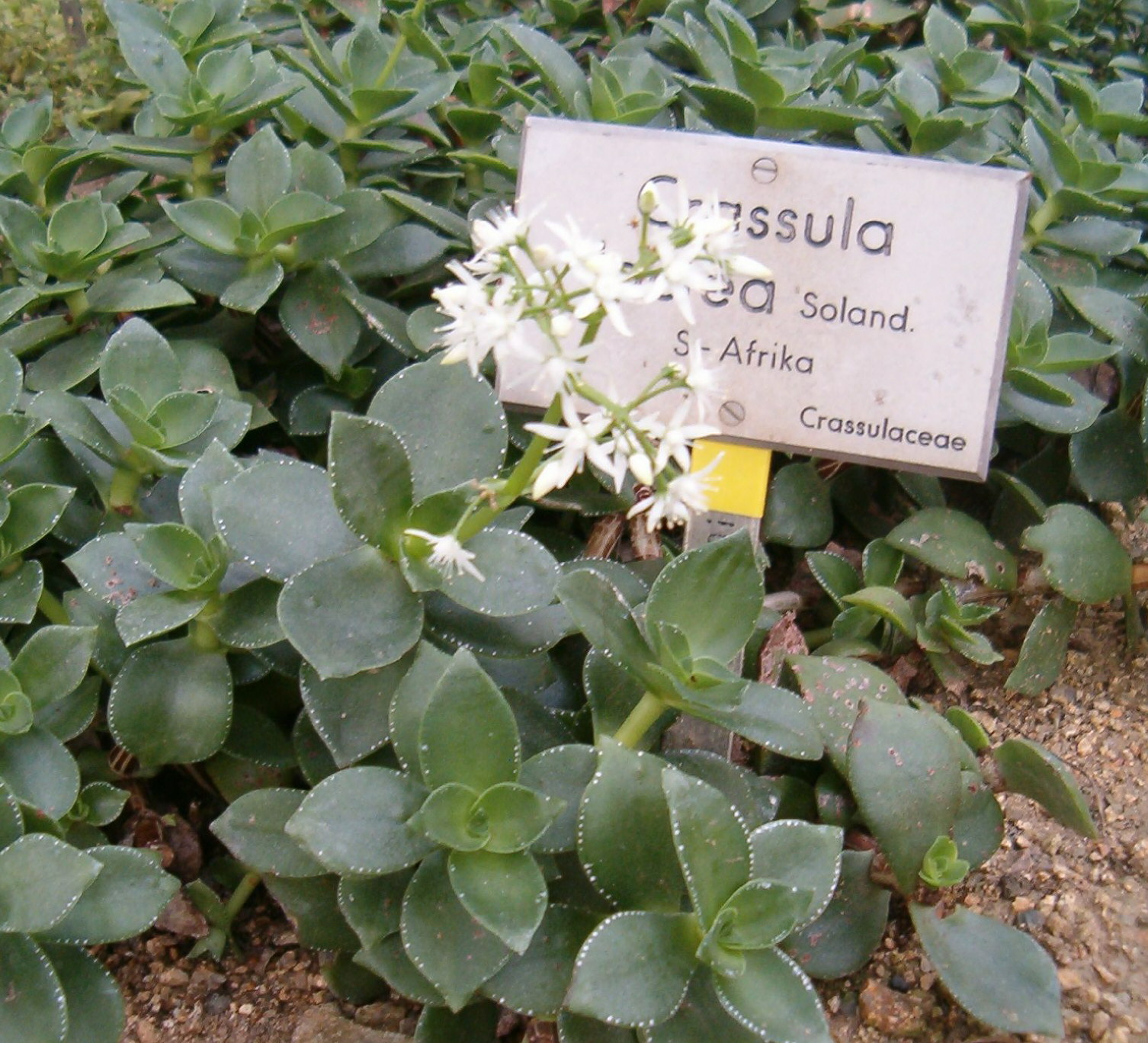

Scientific classification
- Kingdom: Plantae
- Clade: Tracheophytes
- Clade: Angiosperms
- Clade: Eudicots
- Order: Saxifragales
- Family: Crassulaceae
- Genus: Crassula
- Species: C. lactea

Binomial name
- Crassula lactea Masson

= Crassula lactea =

Taylor's parches

Species of succulent

Crassula lactea is a perennial flowering plant native to southern Africa. It blooms in the winter with white flowers.

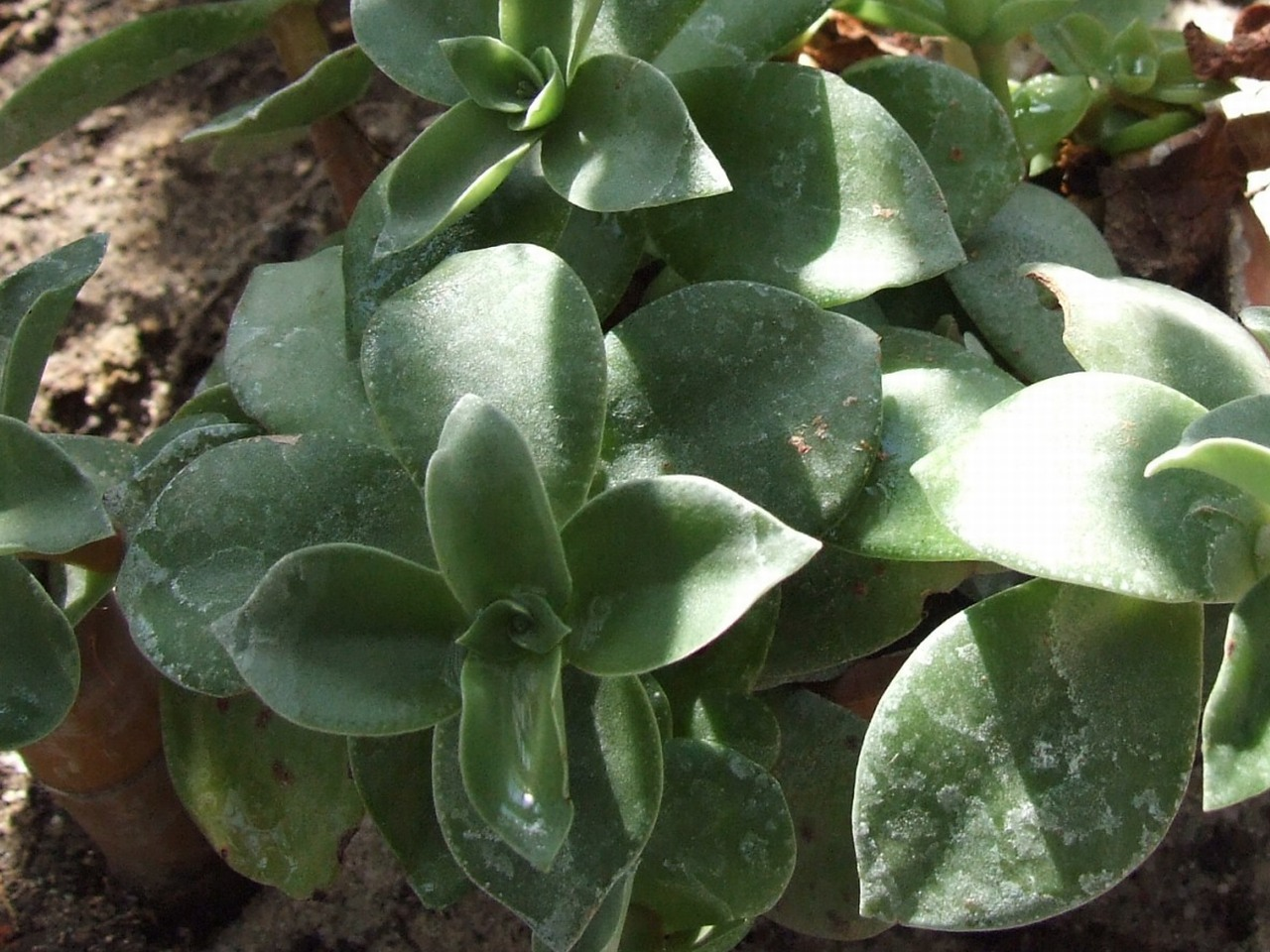
Leaf detail
