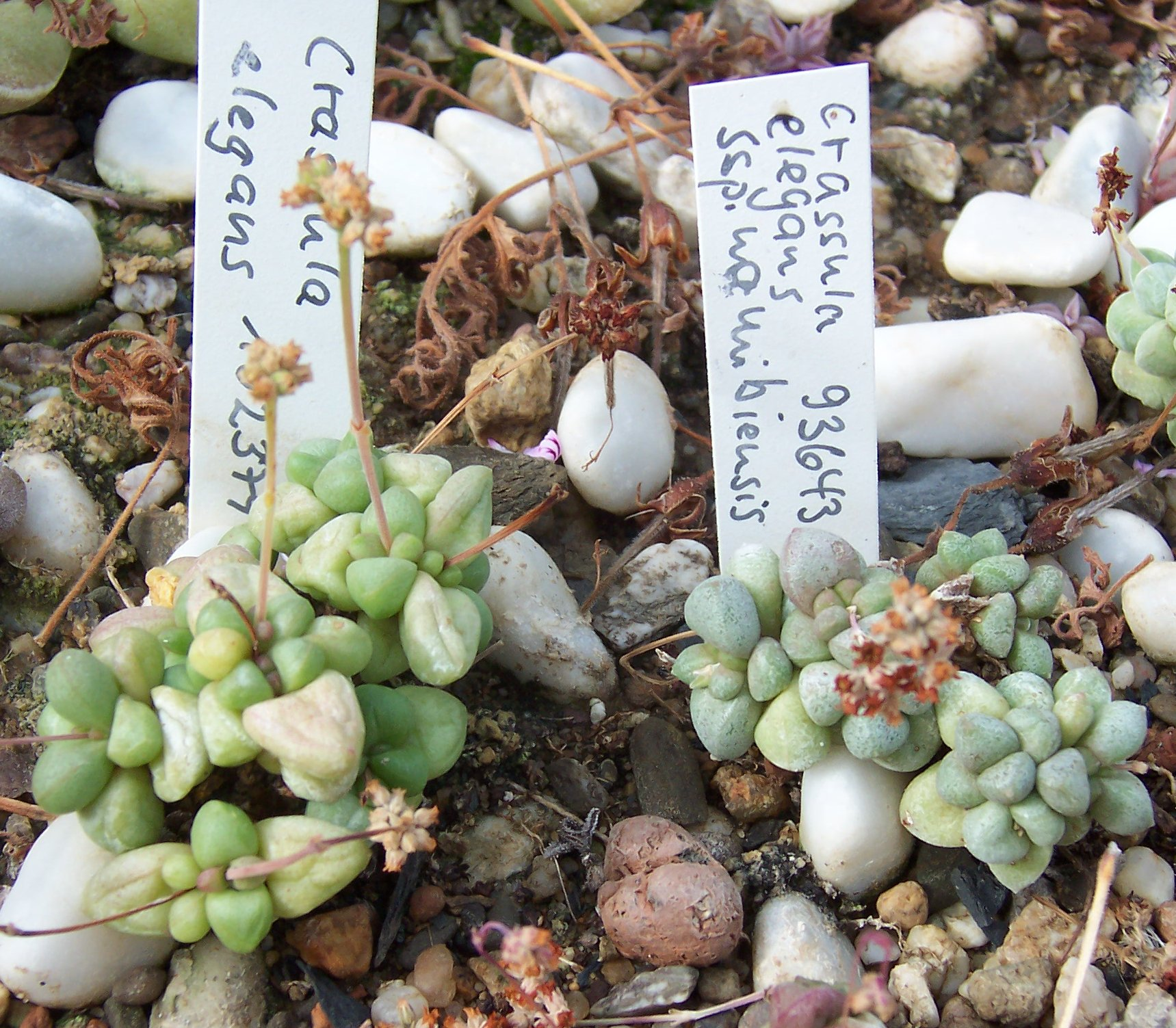
- Nominate subspecies (left); Ssp. namibiensis (right)

Scientific classification
- Kingdom: Plantae
- Clade: Tracheophytes
- Clade: Angiosperms
- Clade: Eudicots
- Order: Saxifragales
- Family: Crassulaceae
- Genus: Crassula
- Species: C. elegans

Binomial name
- Crassula elegans Schoenl. & Baker f., 1902

= Crassula elegans =

Elegant crassula

Species of succulent

Crassula elegans, the elegant crassula, is a flowering plant species in the genus Crassula.

Subspecies are:

- Crassula elegans subsp. elegans Schoenl. & Baker f.
- Crassula elegans subsp. namibensis (Friedr.) Toelken
