= Kalanchoe crundallii =

Scientific classification
- Kingdom: Plantae
- Clade: Tracheophytes
- Clade: Angiosperms
- Clade: Eudicots
- Order: Saxifragales
- Family: Crassulaceae
- Genus: Kalanchoe
- Species: K. crundallii

Binomial name
- Kalanchoe crundallii I.Verd.

Species of flowering plant

Kalanchoe crundallii is a species of flowering plant in the family Crassulaceae. It is a succulent plant with yellow flowers. The species is native to South Africa, and was described in 1946.

== Taxonomy ==
The species was described by Inez Clare Verdoorn in 1946.

== Distribution ==
Kalanchoe crundallii is native to the subtropical biome of Limpopo, South Africa. It grows in the Soutpansberg, near boulders, in forested areas.

== Description ==
Kalanchoe crundallii is a succulent annual or subshrub. The branches are cylindrical. The roots are fleshy. The leaves are orbicular, oblong or obovate, 3.5–7 centimetres (1.4–2.8 in) long, and 3–5 centimetres (1.2–2.0 in) wide.

The leaf edges are smooth, faintly toothed, or curved, and are sometimes red around the edges. Older leaves may have flaking wax. The leaf stems are 8–15 millimetres (0.31–0.59 in) long.

The inflorescence is an elongated thyrse. The flowers are deep yellow, developing a red tinge with age. The calyx has triangular lobes, which are 2–3 millimetres (0.079–0.118 in) long. The corolla is a cylindrical tube, measuring 14–15 millimetres (0.55–0.59 in) long. The corolla has ovate lobes, which are 3–4 millimetres (0.12–0.16 in) long, and around 3 millimetres (0.12 in) wide.

The seeds are around 1.5 millimetres (0.059 in) long.

== Conservation ==
Kalanchoe crundallii is listed as Rare in the Red List of South African Plants. It may be threatened by harvesting for horticulture.
