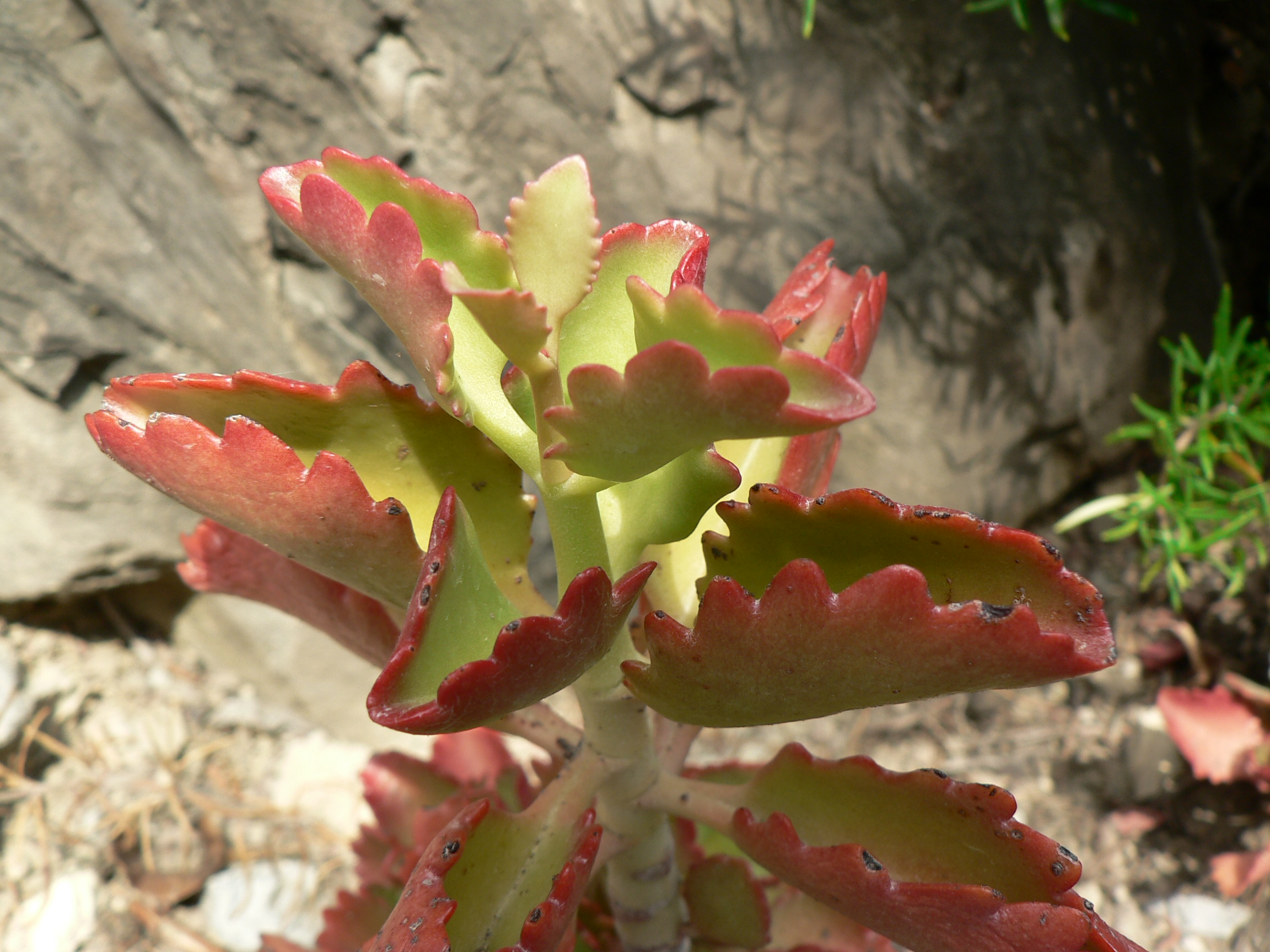

Scientific classification
- Kingdom: Plantae
- Clade: Tracheophytes
- Clade: Angiosperms
- Clade: Eudicots
- Order: Saxifragales
- Family: Crassulaceae
- Genus: Kalanchoe
- Species: K. sexangularis

Binomial name
- Kalanchoe sexangularis N.E.Br.

= Kalanchoe sexangularis =

Species of succulent

Kalanchoe sexangularis, also known as bushveld kalanchoe, six-angled kalanchoe, or red-leaved kalanchoe, is a species of flowering plant in the family Crassulaceae that is native to Southern Africa.

== Description ==
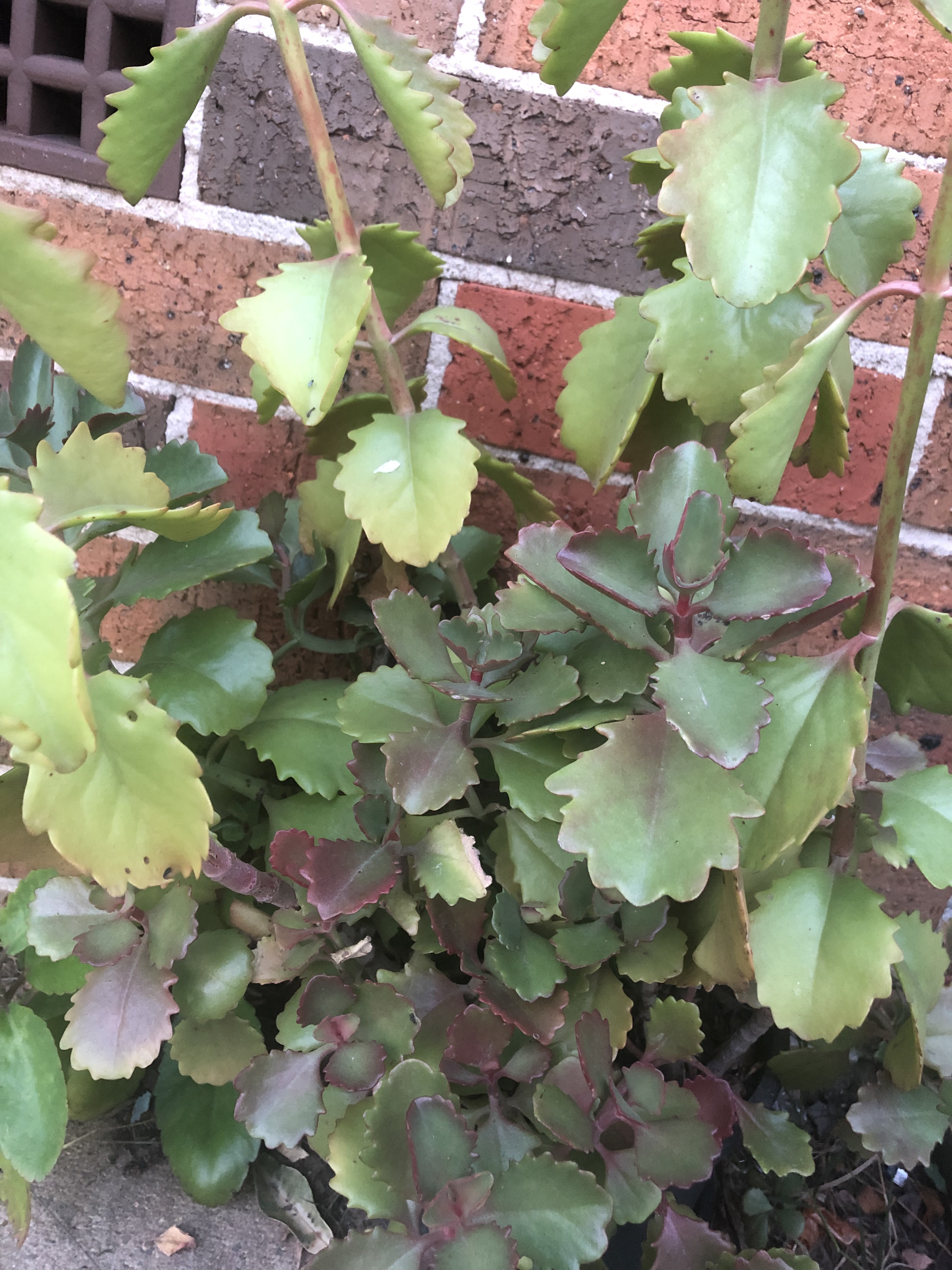
Leaves

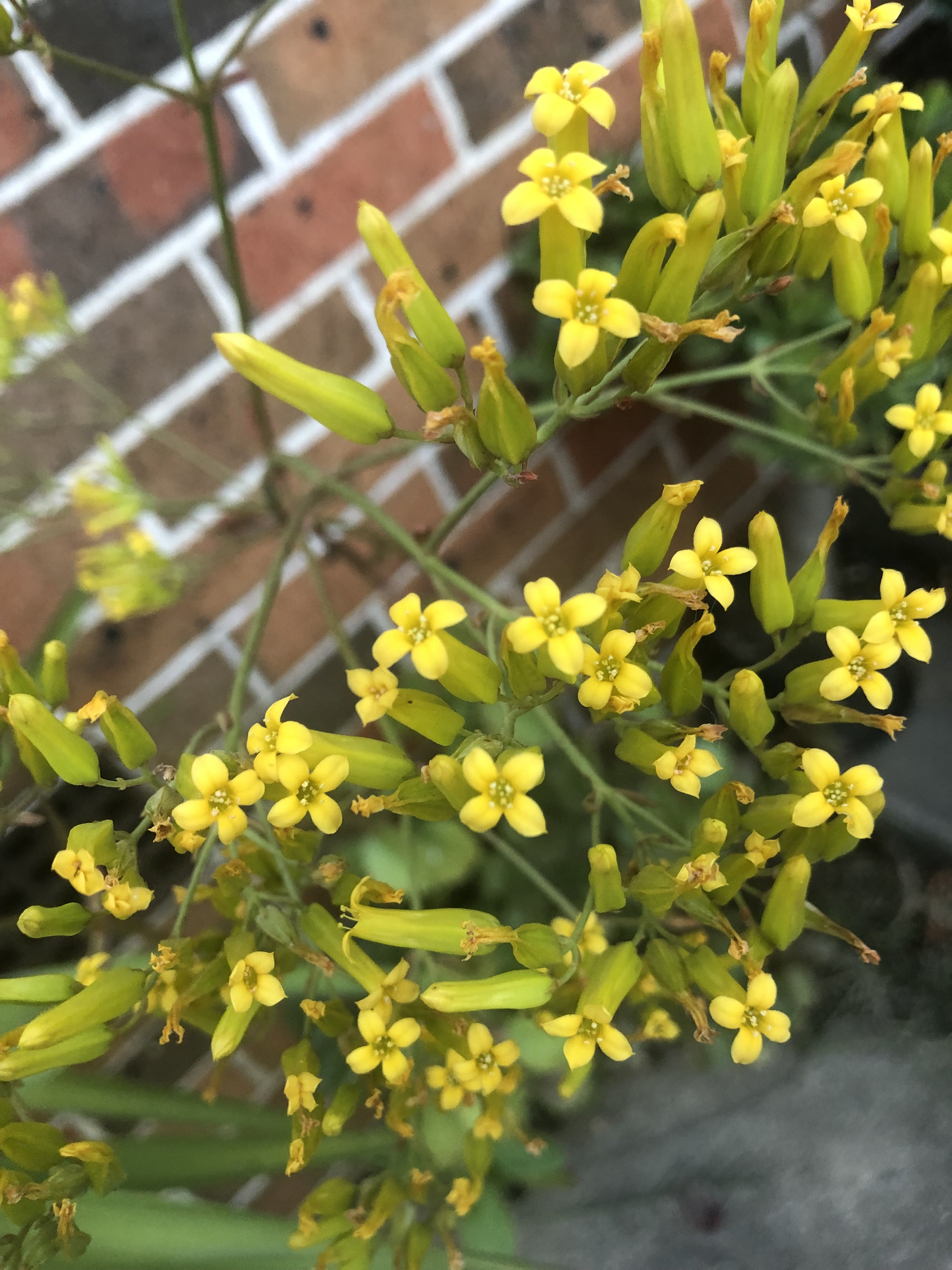
Flowers

Kalanchoe sexangularis is a succulent, perennial that reaches heights of 20 to 100 centimeters. Its single or few simple, upright, round, reddish shoots are somewhat two-to-six-sided and arise from a woody base. The fleshy leaves are more or less stalked. The rutty petiole is 4 to 45 millimeters long. On the lower leaves it does not encompass the stem, but on the upper leaves it is clearly encompassing the stem.

The leaf blade may be broad, elliptical, elongate or oval in shape, with a green to deep, ruby-red (in full sun) hue. Leaves measure between 12–33 cm (5-13") long and between 7–20 cm (3-8") wide. The leaf tip is generally rounded or blunt. The base of the lower leaves is heart-shaped, that of the upper is wedge-shaped. The leaf margin is roughly notched, with a wavy edging, sometimes with one or several bluntly jagged lobes.

=== Inflorescences ===
A winter-bloomer, K. sexangularis' inflorescence consists of flat-topped panicles up to 30 cm (11.8") in length. The upright, green-yellow to bright yellow flowers are on 2–7 mm long peduncles.

The green calyx tube is 0.5 to 2 millimeters long. The triangular, pointed calyx lobes are 1.5 to 2.2 millimeters long and about 1.2 millimeters wide. The pale pink, square-cylindrical to almost pyramidal corolla tube is enlarged in the lower half and 8 to 13 millimeters long. Their salmon-colored, broadly egg-shaped to almost circular corolla lobes are narrowed or rounded at their tip and have a length of 2 to 4 millimeters and are 1.5 to 3 millimeters wide. The stamens are attached to the tip of the corolla tube. Upper stamens protrude from the flower. The almost circular anthers are 0.4 to 1 millimeter long. The linear-lanceolate, pointed nectar flakes are 1.6 to 4 millimeters long. The carpel has a length of 6.5 to 10 millimeters. The stylus is 1.7 to 4 millimeters long.

The seeds reach a length of 1 to 1.3 millimeters.

== Distribution ==
Kalanchoe sexangularis is common in Zimbabwe, Mozambique and South Africa on rocky slopes in the shade or partial shade of trees or shrubs in bushland.

== See also ==
- Kalanchoe longiflora
