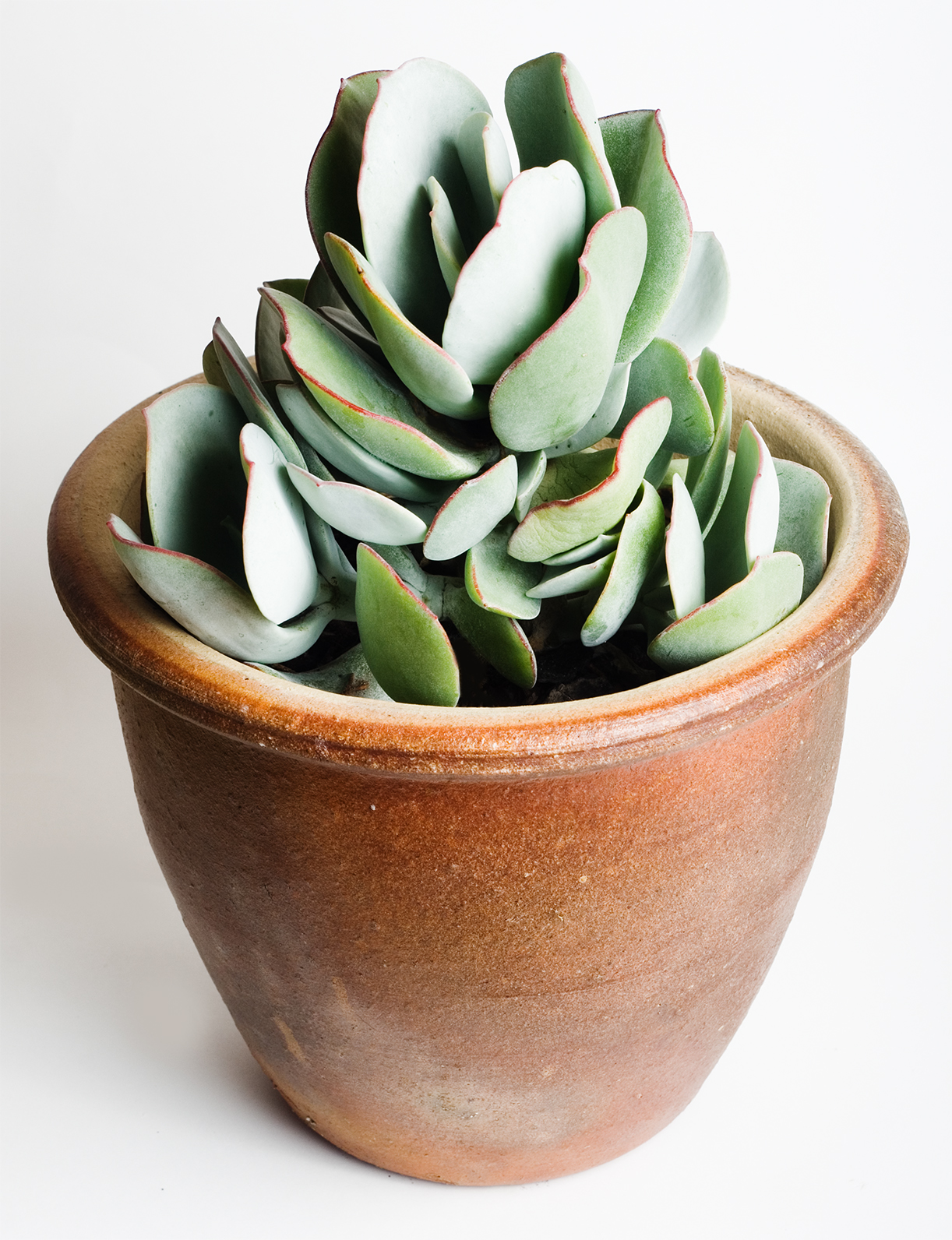

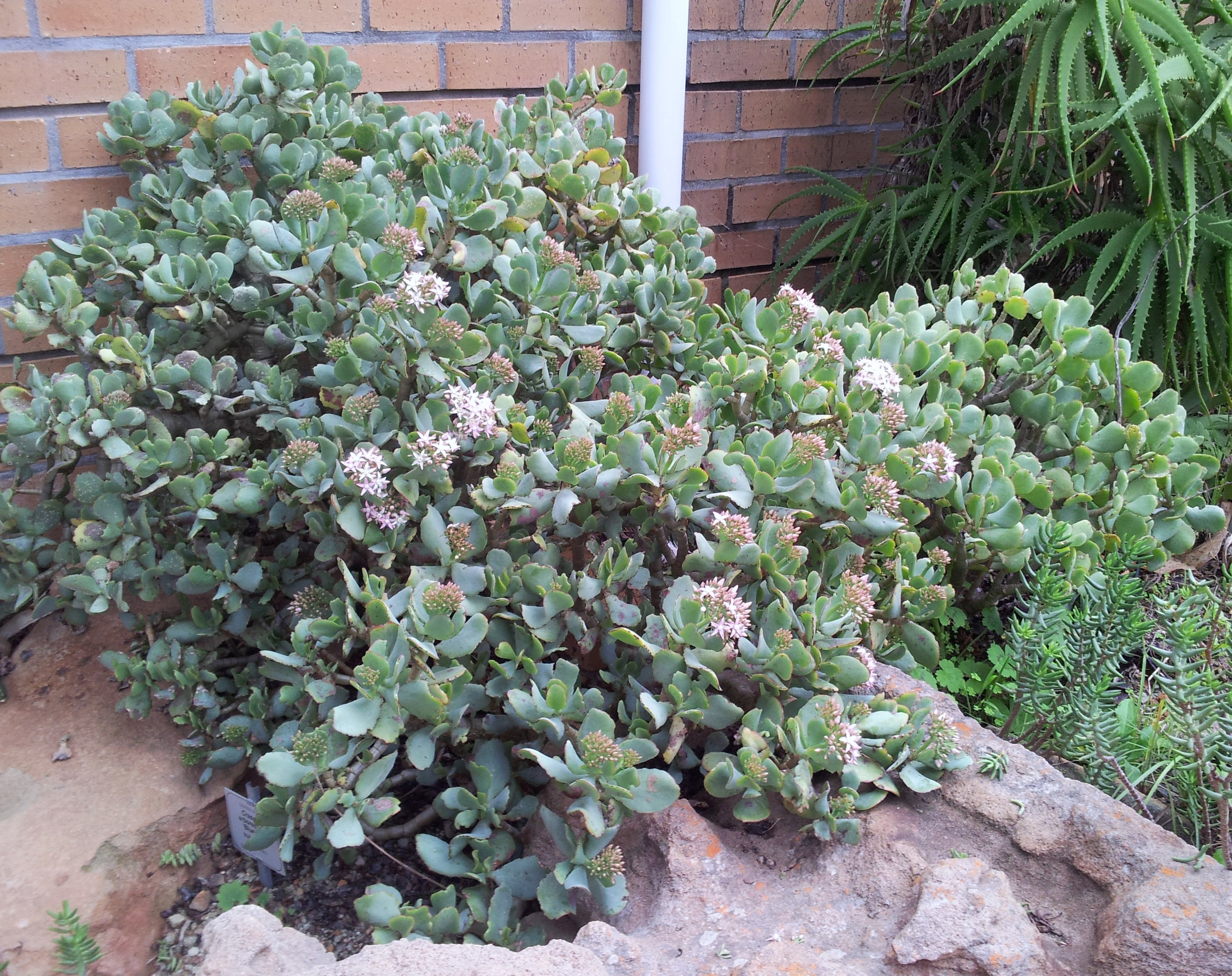
- At Kirstenbosch National Botanical Garden, South Africa

Scientific classification
- Kingdom: Plantae
- Clade: Tracheophytes
- Clade: Angiosperms
- Clade: Eudicots
- Order: Saxifragales
- Family: Crassulaceae
- Genus: Crassula
- Species: C. arborescens

Binomial name
- Crassula arborescens (Mill.) Willd.
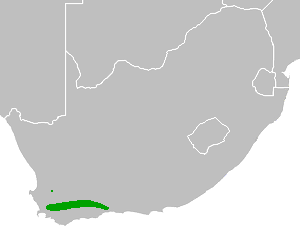
- native range

= Crassula arborescens =

Silver dollar plant

Species of succulent

Crassula arborescens—the silver jade plant, silver dollar (jade) plant, beestebul, Chinese jade, cookie plant, money plant, or money tree, that is endemic to Western Cape, South Africa, is a species of succulent plant in the family Crassulaceae.

== Description ==
It grows into a 2 to 4 ft (0.6 to 1.2 m), succulent shrub. It has a single main trunk that can reach a diameter of up to 6 centimeters. The branches are thickened and gray-green in color. Shoots with leaves have a diameter of 7 to 10 millimeters.

Unlike the related Crassula ovata (more commonly-referred to as 'jade'), C. arborescens has rounded, red-edged, gray leaves shaped like "silver dollars" or "cookies". Older shoots have a yellowish-brown bark that peels off that are divided into individual sections at the nodes. The flat and obovate to obovate-round leaves are 3.2 to 7 centimeters long and 2.3 to 4.2 centimeters wide. They are glaucous in color, have a powdery coating and are spotted with clearly visible water gaps. The leaf edges are reddish and the leaf base is wedge-shaped.

=== Inflorescences ===
It blooms in summer, with typical star-shaped Crassula white or pink flowers. The terminal inflorescence consists of thyrses that are rounded at the top and is 5 to 8 centimeters high. It has a lot of dichasia. The 4 millimeter thick inflorescence stalk is 15 to 30 millimeters long and the flower stalk 10 to 12 millimeters long. The sepals are broadly triangular in shape. The star-shaped corolla reaches a diameter of 18 to 20 millimeters and is light pink or white. The lanceolate petals are 9 to 10 millimeters long and 2.5 to 3 millimeters wide. The stamens are 5 to 6 millimeters long and the purple-colored anther is less than 1 millimeter in size.

The fruits are follicles, about 6 mm long and oval in shape, composed of 3-5 follicles each. Generally, even once dried, they remain attached to the plant and the seeds, which are small in size, will then be dispersed by the wind.

== Cultivation ==
It is cultivated as an ornamental plant for use in drought tolerant and succulent gardens, and in container gardens. It is also suitable for growing indoors as a houseplant if provided with full-exposure, sunny windows or grow lights, to prevent etiolation.

== Distribution ==
It is native to the South African provinces of Western Cape, Eastern Cape and southern KwaZulu-Natal. The plants grow on dry rocky surfaces in the Succulent Karoo.

== Gallery ==
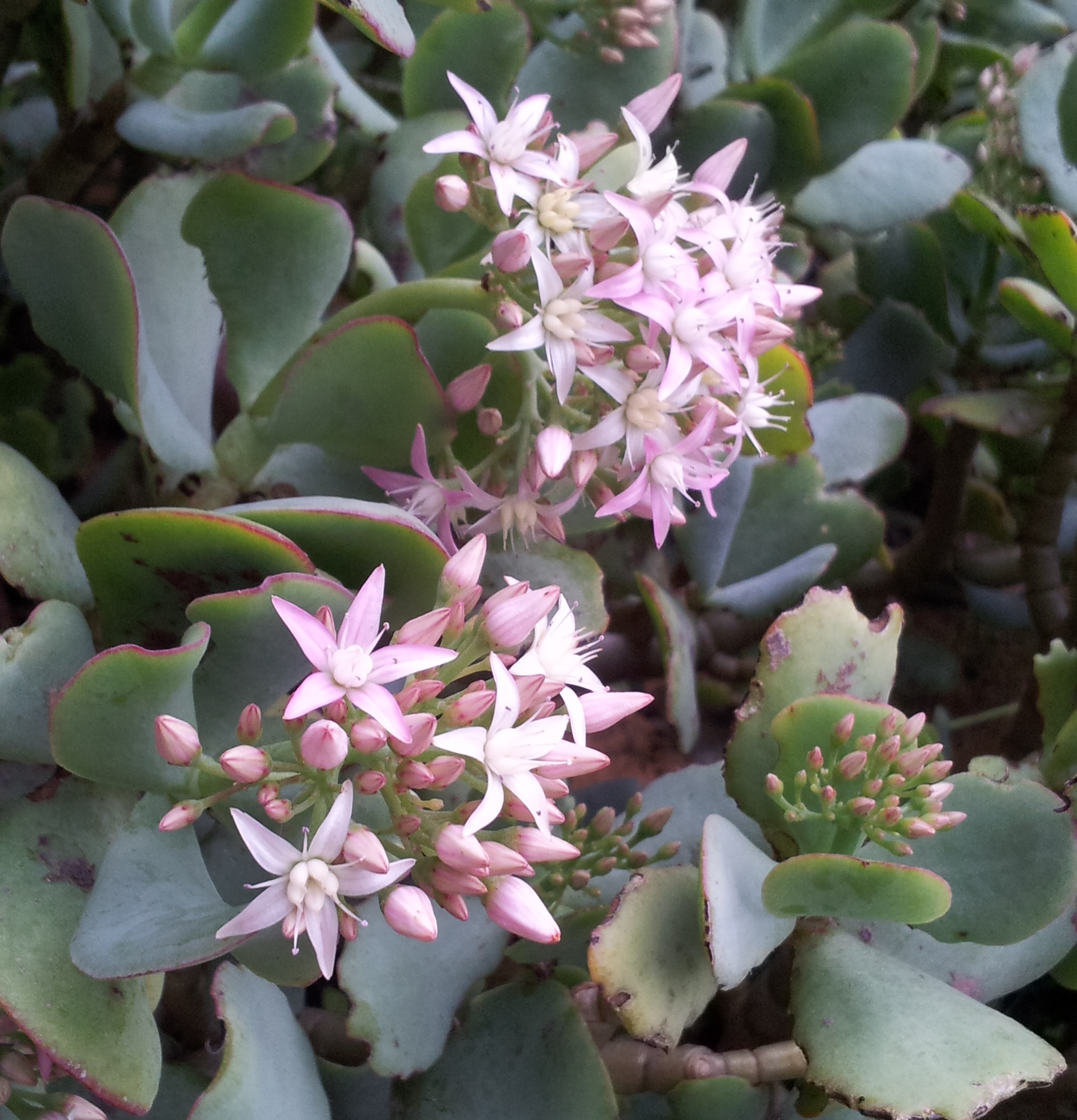
Closeup of flowers

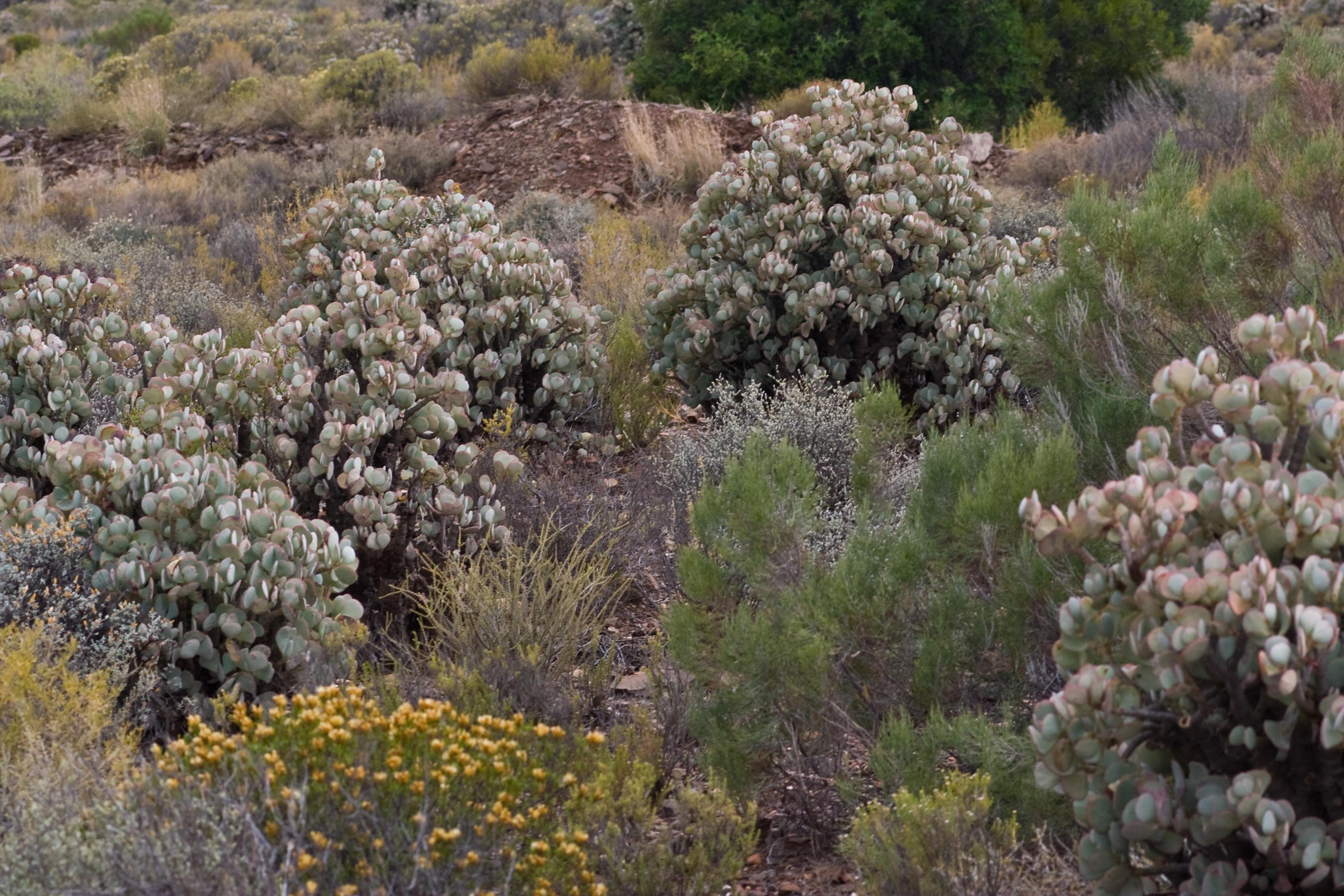
In habitat, Western Cape, South Africa

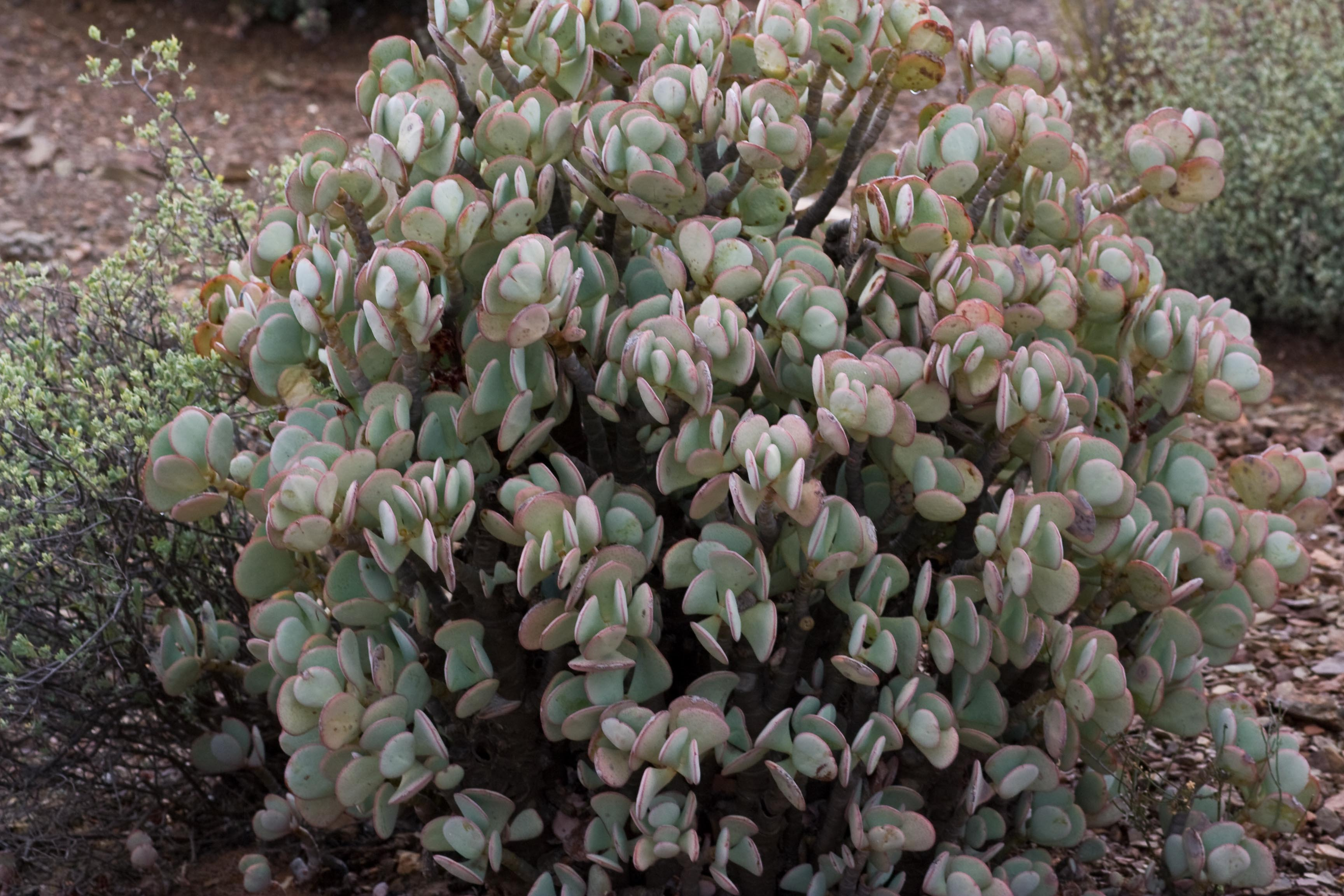
In habitat, Western Cape, South Africa

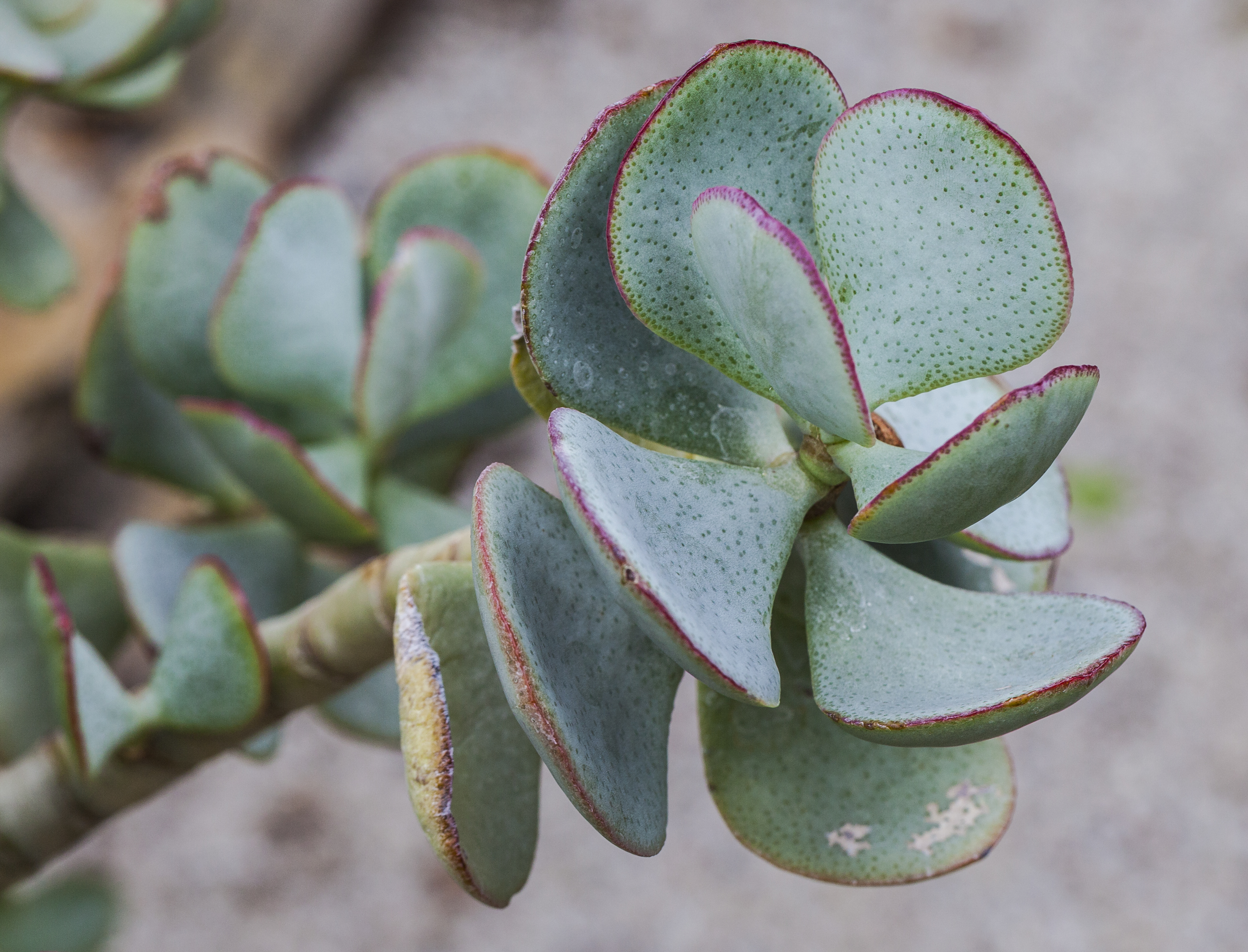
Leaves

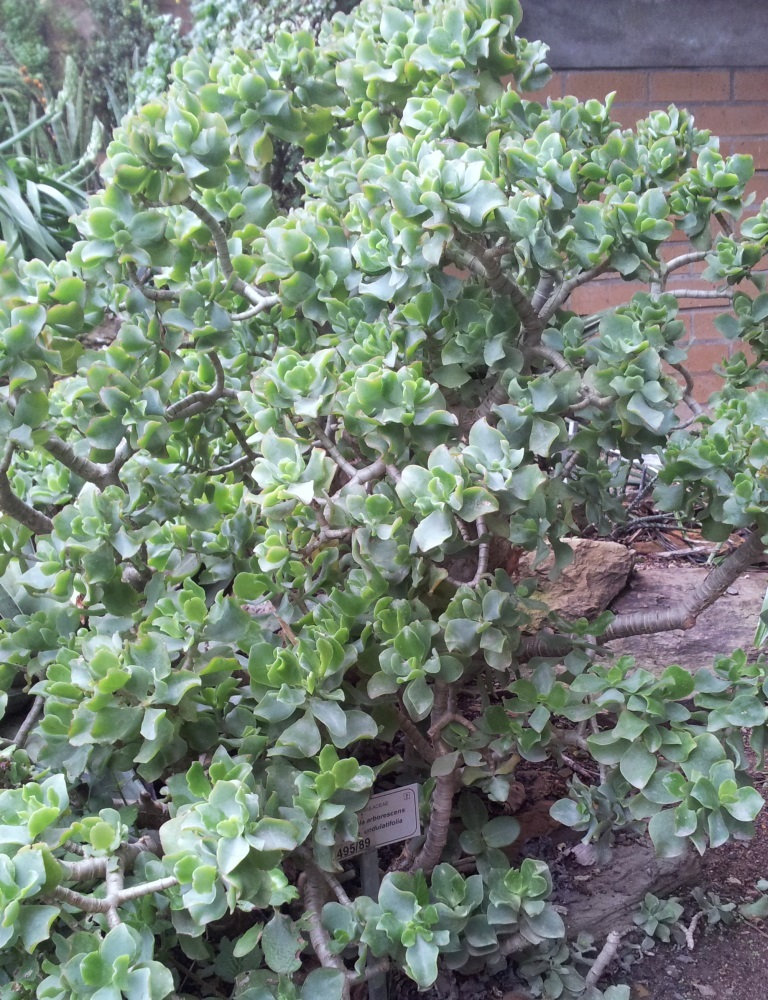
C. arborescens ssp. undulatifolia, Kirstenbosch Nat'l Botanical Garden
