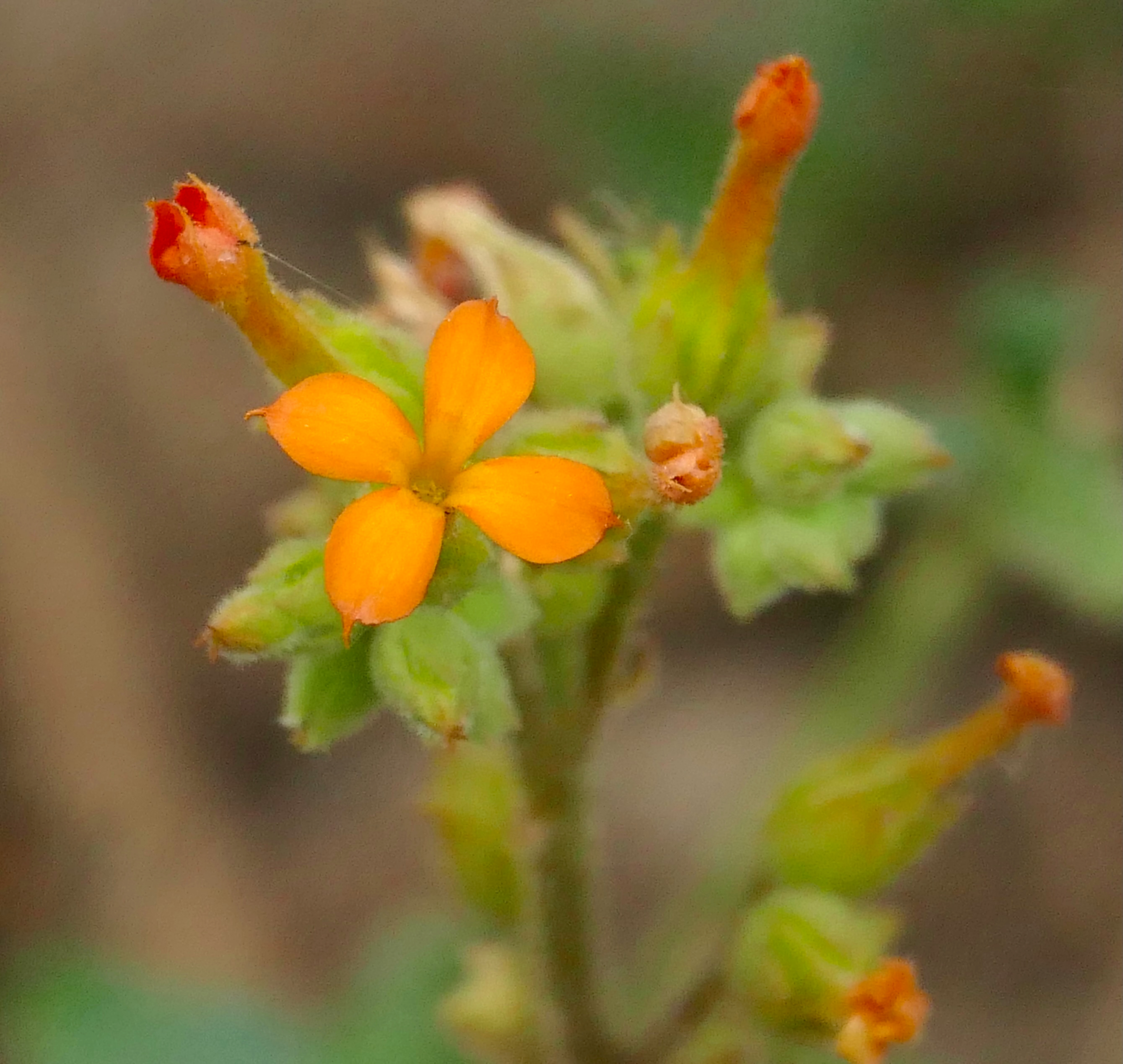

Conservation status
- Least Concern (SANBI Red List)

Scientific classification
- Kingdom: Plantae
- Clade: Tracheophytes
- Clade: Angiosperms
- Clade: Eudicots
- Order: Saxifragales
- Family: Crassulaceae
- Genus: Kalanchoe
- Species: K. lanceolata

Binomial name
- Kalanchoe lanceolata (Forssk.) Pers. (1805)

Synonyms
- Cotyledon lanceolata Forssk.; Verea lanceolata (Forssk.) Spreng.; Kalanchoe glandulosa Hochst. ex A.Rich.; Kalanchoe goetzei Engl.; Kalanchoe gregaria Dinter; Kalanchoe pilosa Baker; Kalanchoe platysepala Welw. ex Britten; Kalanchoe brachycalyx A.Rich.; Kalanchoe homblei De Wild.; Kalanchoe junodii Schinz; Kalanchoe pentheri Schltr.; Kalanchoe ellacombei N.E.Br.; Kalanchoe modesta Kotschy & Peyr.

= Kalanchoe lanceolata =

Species of succulent plant

Kalanchoe lanceolata, commonly known as the narrow-leaved kalanchoe, is a species of succulent plant in the family Crassulaceae. It is native to tropical and southern Africa, Madagascar, the southwestern Arabian Peninsula, and the Indian subcontinent. The plant is widely used in traditional medicine across Africa and India, and is also cultivated as an ornamental.

== Description ==
Kalanchoe lanceolata is an annual to biennial succulent herb with an erect, usually unbranched stem that reaches 11.5 to 150 cm (4.5 to 59.1 in) in height, occasionally up to 2 m (6.6 ft). The stem is distinctly 4-angled (quadrangular), green or yellowish-green, and covered with long glandular hairs up to 3.5 mm (0.14 in) long, particularly in the upper portions. The plant develops from a fairly swollen rootstock.

The leaves are sessile (lacking a petiole) and arranged oppositely on the stem. They are succulent but not thickly fleshy, papery to membranous in texture, and pale green to yellowish-green when dried. The leaf shape varies from obovate, obovate-oblong, to narrowly oblong- or linear-lanceolate, measuring 3 to 23 cm (1.2 to 9.1 in) in length and 0.7 to 9 cm (0.28 to 3.54 in) in width. The leaf margins are entire (smooth) on upper leaves and scalloped (crenate) on lower leaves. The leaf surfaces may be smooth or covered with short glandular hairs.

The flowers are erect, borne in dense terminal dichasia or thyrse-like inflorescences up to 50 cm (20 in) long. The flowers are small, tubular to bell-shaped, with colors ranging from pale apricot-orange to deep orange-red, and rarely yellow or pinkish. The corolla tube is 8 to 15 mm (0.31 to 0.59 in) long, with four obovate lobes 2.6 to 6.5 mm (0.10 to 0.26 in) long. The flowers have four stamens inserted above the middle of the corolla tube, and the carpels are 6 to 9 mm (0.24 to 0.35 in) long.

The fruit is a small capsule containing numerous tiny seeds, each 0.5 to 0.75 mm (0.020 to 0.030 in) long.

== Taxonomy ==
The species was first described as Cotyledon lanceolata by the Swedish botanist Peter Forsskål in his posthumous work Flora Aegyptiaco-Arabica (1775), based on collections from Arabia. It was later reclassified into the genus Kalanchoe by the German botanist Christiaan Hendrik Persoon in 1805.

The genus name Kalanchoe is derived from the Chinese words "Kalan Chauchy," meaning "that which falls, grows," referring to the asexual reproduction in the genus, where plantlets form on leaf margins and fall to the ground to produce new plants. The specific epithet lanceolata is Latin for "lance-shaped," describing the characteristic shape of the leaves.

The species is highly variable in leaf shape, hair density, and flower color across its wide range. This variation has led to the description of numerous synonyms. Some authorities have attempted to distinguish subspecific taxa, but the existence of intermediate forms makes such distinctions difficult.

== Distribution and habitat ==
Kalanchoe lanceolata has a remarkably wide native range, spanning tropical and southern Africa, southwestern Madagascar, the southwestern Arabian Peninsula (Yemen), and the Indian subcontinent. Its African distribution includes Senegal, Guinea, Mali, Ghana, Nigeria, Cameroon, Sudan, Eritrea, Ethiopia, Somalia, Uganda, Kenya, Tanzania, Angola, Zambia, Malawi, Mozambique, Zimbabwe, Botswana, Namibia, Eswatini, and South Africa (where it occurs in the provinces of Limpopo, Gauteng, North West, and Mpumalanga).

The species grows primarily in the seasonally dry tropical biome, at elevations from 900 to 2,100 m (3,000 to 6,900 ft). Its typical habitats include open dry woodlands, wooded grasslands, rocky hillsides, and well-drained savannas. It is often found in sheltered positions under trees and bushes, as well as on damp termite mounds and along river banks. The plant prefers well-drained sandy, loamy, or heavy clay soils, and occasionally grows epiphytically on trees.

== Ecology ==
Kalanchoe lanceolata flowers from April to July in southern Africa, attracting livestock such as goats, sheep, and cows during drought periods when grazing is scarce. The leaves and flowers contain a group of toxic glycosides known as bufadienolides, which can cause acute cardiac toxicity and death when ingested in large quantities. Despite its toxicity to mammals, the plant is a host for two Lepidoptera species: the tailed black eye butterfly (Leptomyrina hirundo) and the common hairtail butterfly (Anthene definita definita).

== Cultivation ==
Kalanchoe lanceolata is cultivated as an ornamental plant in gardens and as a houseplant.

=== Propagation ===
The species is easily propagated by stem cuttings: a single leaf with part of its stem, when placed on soil, will produce roots and grow into a new plant. It can also be grown from seed.

== Uses ==
=== Traditional medicine ===
Different cultures use the plant to treat a variety of ailments:

- Among the Tswana people of southern Africa, the plant is known as moithimodiso ("something that makes you sneeze"). The roots are dried and pulverized into a powder and taken as a snuff to treat headaches and neck pains; it is believed that sneezing after taking the powder relieves the pain.
- In India, tribal communities use the leaf juice to cure dysentery.
- In Ethiopia, fresh leaves are heated moderately and applied to wounds to promote healing.
- In Namibia, the Kwanyama tribe boils the leaves to produce an infusion that is poured into a child's ear to reduce fever.
- In Zimbabwe, the plant is known as intelezi (meaning "juju" or charm) among the Ndebele people and is used in traditional rituals.

=== Phytochemical research ===
A 2025 study investigated the antioxidant and anti-Parkinson activities of Kalanchoe lanceolata extracts in rats, finding that various fractions of the plant possessed flavonoids, alkaloids, terpenoids, saponins, tannins, and anthraquinones. The study suggested potential therapeutic applications, though further research is needed.

== Toxicity ==
The leaves and flowers contain bufadienolides, cardiac glycosides that can cause acute cardiac toxicity and death in livestock when consumed in large quantities.

== Common names ==
The species is known by various common names across its range:

- English: Narrow-leaved kalanchoe, sneeze plant, lance-leaved kalanchoe, Madagascar widow's thrill
- Setswana: Moithimodiso ("something that makes you sneeze")
- Ndebele: Intelezi ("juju" or charm)
- Afrikaans: Smidspasie, smitspasie

== Conservation status ==
Kalanchoe lanceolata is classified as Least Concern (LC) on the South African National Biodiversity Institute (SANBI) Red List. The species has not been formally assessed by the IUCN Red List, but its wide distribution and abundance suggest it is not currently at risk of extinction.
