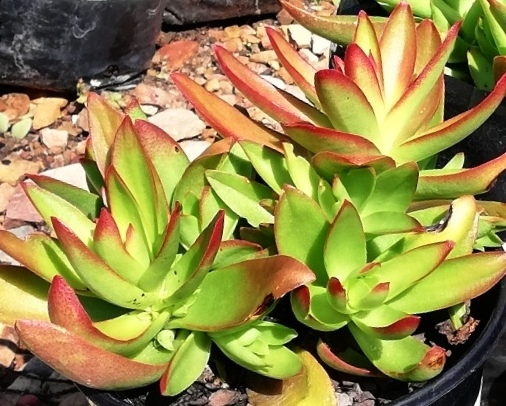
- Crassula capitella

Scientific classification
- Kingdom: Plantae
- Clade: Tracheophytes
- Clade: Angiosperms
- Clade: Eudicots
- Order: Saxifragales
- Family: Crassulaceae
- Genus: Crassula
- Species: C. capitella

Binomial name
- Crassula capitella Thunb., 1778

= Crassula capitella =

Campfire Plant

Species of succulent

Crassula capitella, (red flames, red pagoda or campfire plant) is a perennial succulent plant native to southern Africa.

== Description ==
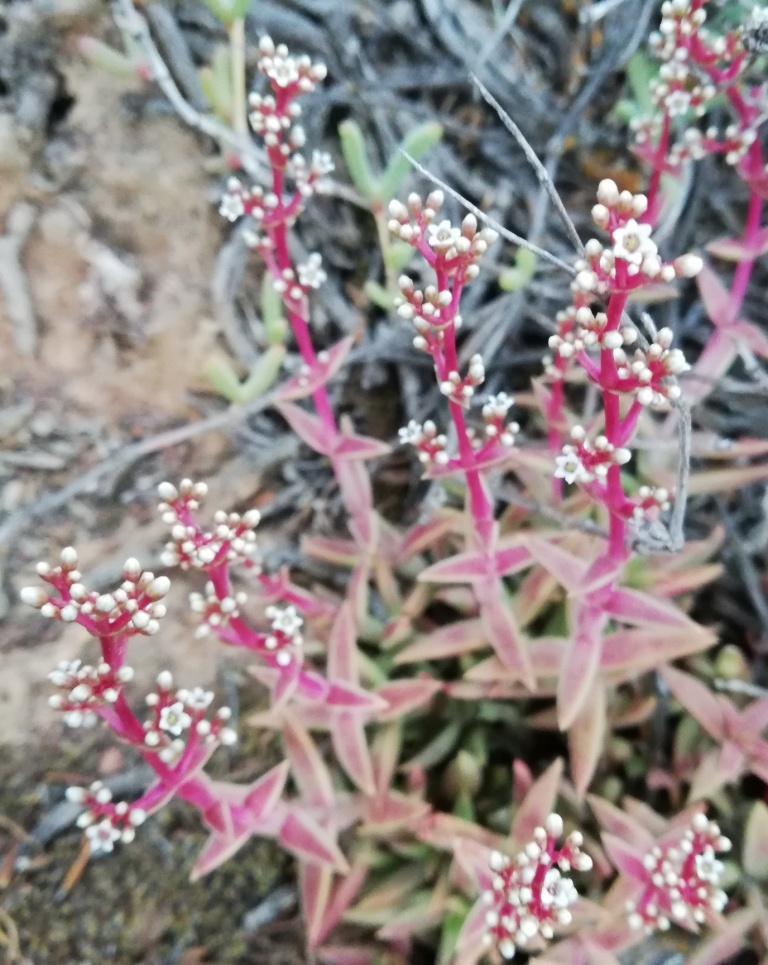
Flowers of Crassula capitella subsp thyrsiflora, growing in the Robertson Karoo

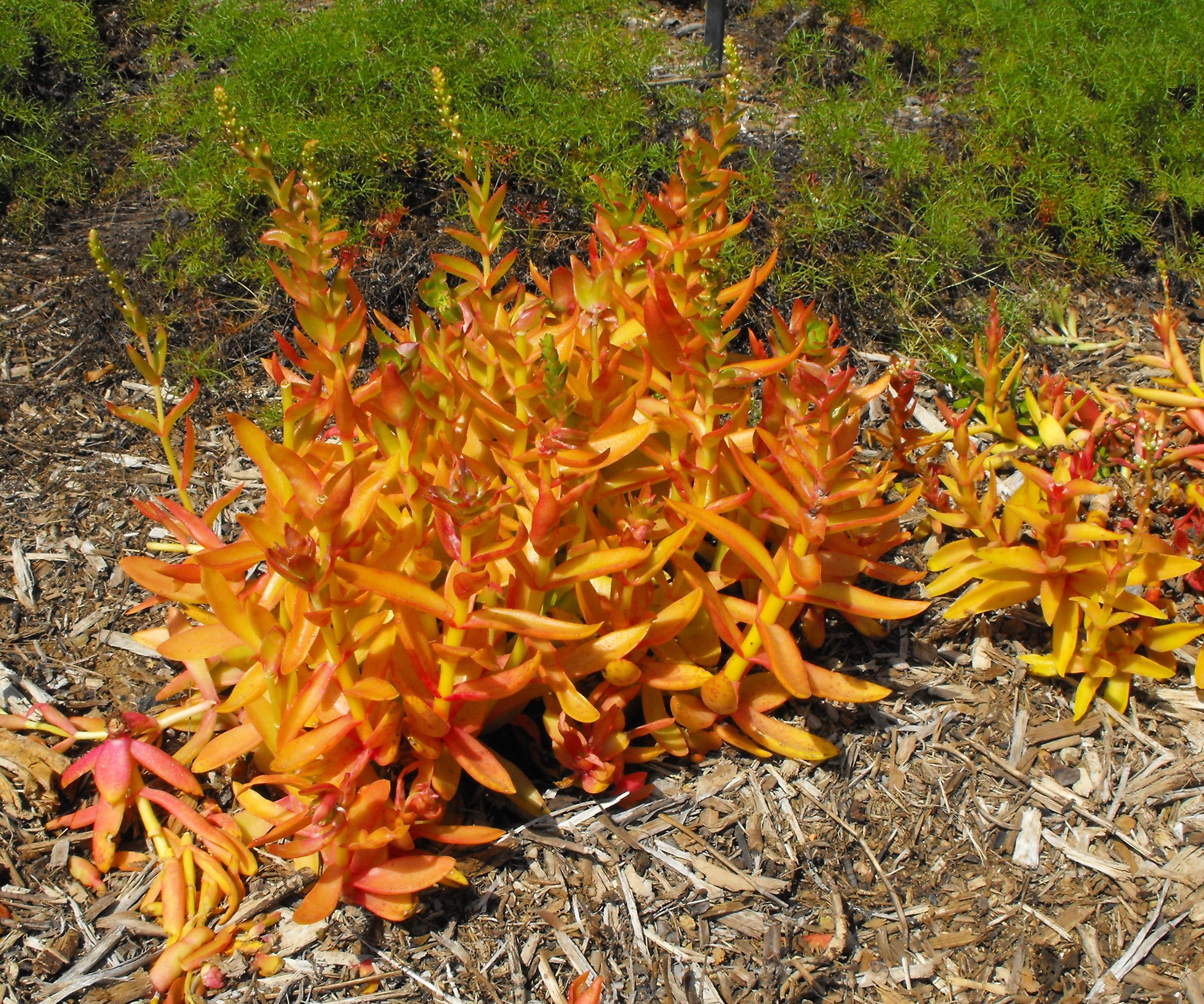
The "campfire" cultivar

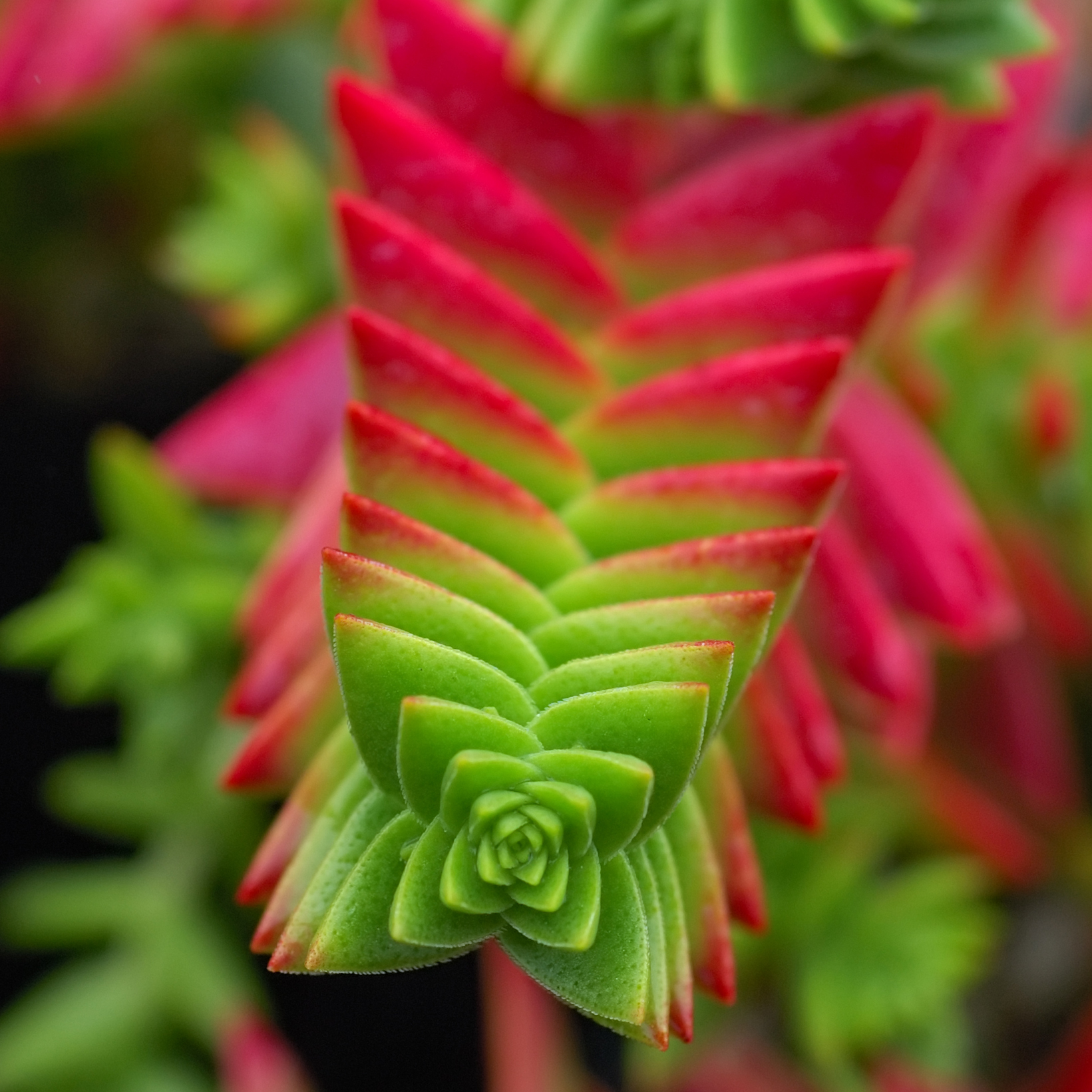
Compact form of Crassula capitella subsp thyrsiflora

An extremely variable species. The narrow, pointed, splayed ("propeller-like") leaves are initially a light green, but become a strong reddish colour in the sun.

The leaves are stacked, and near the base of the rosette they are larger. Near the top of a rosette, the leaves gradually get smaller and change into floral bracts, as the stem forms a long, pointed inflorescence.

It is a small, succulent herb (15–40 cm in height) - with stems that are either erect or rambling and mat-forming. Each stem forms roots at its internodes, which take root if the stem lies against the ground.

C.capitella is mostly biennial, blooming in the summer, with small, white, star-shaped flowers forming all around each thick, upright stem. It grows to a height of about 6 inches tall, and will be damaged when exposed to temperatures below 30 °F (−1 °C).

== Cultivation ==
Crassula capitella prefer full sun to partial shade, with average watering needs, and it should not be exposed to temperatures below 30 °F (−1 °C). It may suffer from foliage edema, which may be the result of rapid changes in moisture.

== Distribution ==
Crassula capitella is native to southern Africa; it is found in Transvaal, Free State, Eastern Cape, and in some parts of southern Namibia and Botswana.

== Subspecies ==
- Crassula capitella subsp. capitella: biennial basal rosette with smooth (hairless) stems and unbranched spike inflorescence. Found in Free State, Eastern Cape, Northern Cape, and Ladismith, Western Cape, South Africa.
- Crassula capitella subsp. enantiophylla
- Crassula capitella subsp. meyeri: a decumbent subspecies from the sandy coastline of KwaZulu-Natal.
- Crassula capitella subsp. nodulosa: a perennial green shrub with one or two rosettes on hairy stems, with scattered reddish blotches and vertical flower spikes. Found in Botswana, Namibia, South Africa, and Zimbabwe, in grassland habitats with scattered, gravelly slopes or kopje formations (inselbergs).
- Crassula capitella subsp. sessilicymula: a perennial shrub (40 cm) with a woody trunk and branched inflorescence. Found in Gauteng and Limpopo (South Africa).
- Crassula capitella subsp. thyrsiflora: a low perennial shrub with multiple pinkish-red rosettes that become stacked in a 'pagoda'-like form (vars. 'Pagoda Village', 'Red Pagoda', 'Red Shark Tooth'), with an unbranched spike inflorescence. From the Western Cape.
- Crassula capitella subsp. corymbulosa: synonymous with C. capitella ssp. thyrsiflora, it is essentially an all-green form of the species. This form may sunburn easily in exposed, sunny locations and prefers dappled shade or bright indirect light to look its best. Often marketed as Crassula corymbulosa 'Shark Tooth' or 'Green Shark Tooth'.
