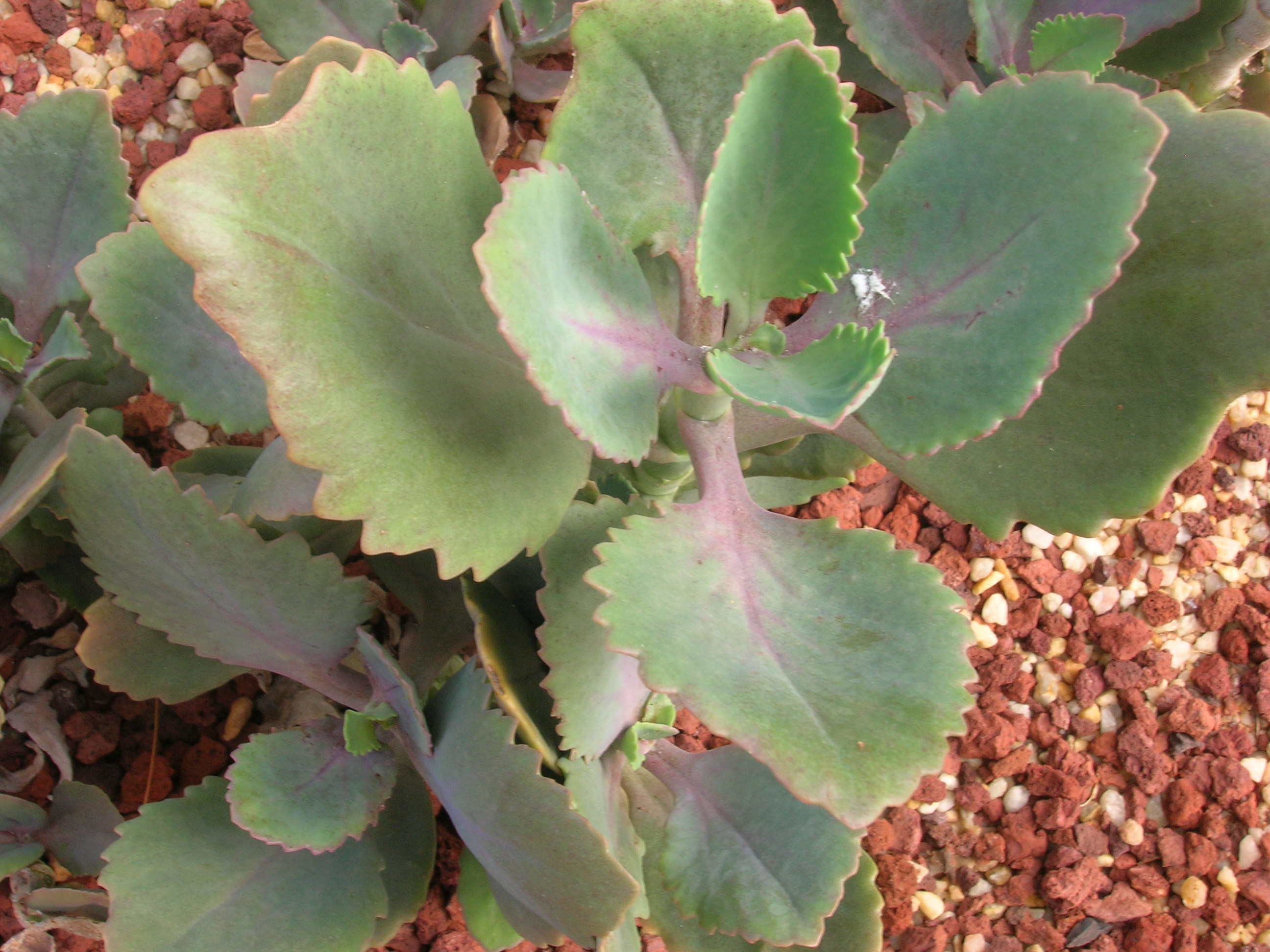

Scientific classification
- Kingdom: Plantae
- Clade: Tracheophytes
- Clade: Angiosperms
- Clade: Eudicots
- Order: Saxifragales
- Family: Crassulaceae
- Genus: Kalanchoe
- Species: K. longiflora

Binomial name
- Kalanchoe longiflora Schltr.

= Kalanchoe longiflora =

Species of succulent

Kalanchoe longiflora, also known as tugela cliff-kalanchoe or long-flower kalanchoe, is a species of the succulent genus Kalanchoe, in the family Crassulaceae. An obscure shrub native to South Africa, it is known for its multi-coloured foliage and yellow flowers, which bloom in autumn to winter.

== Distribution ==
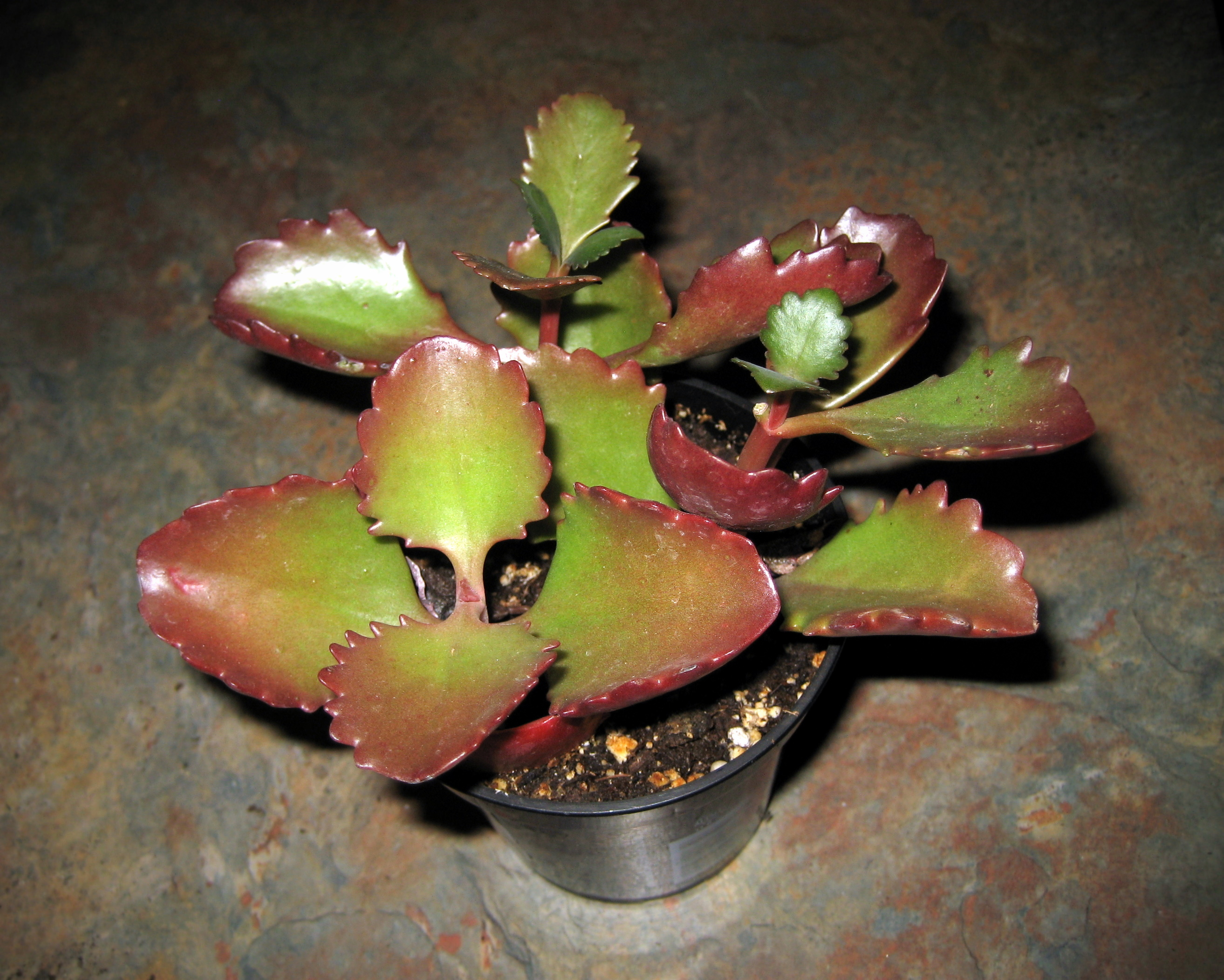
Potted plant

A cliff-denizen, the plant is mainly found on rock edges and shale slopes at an altitude of 800-1700m, in the central Tugela catchment basin, from Tugela Ferry to Muden, in KwaZulu-Natal in South Africa. This species is named for its protracted corolla tubes: longiflora which translates to 'long flowered' from the Latin longus meaning long, and floreo flower.

A vulnerable and rare plant, Kalanchoe longiflora is elusively known and is currently found in less than five regions which are proximate to compactly populated areas, thus degrading the surrounding natural areas due to grazing, trampling and agriculture. Nonetheless, as this plant prefers rocky sites, it could be protected from most human-caused damages and, as such, its population is stable.

== Description ==
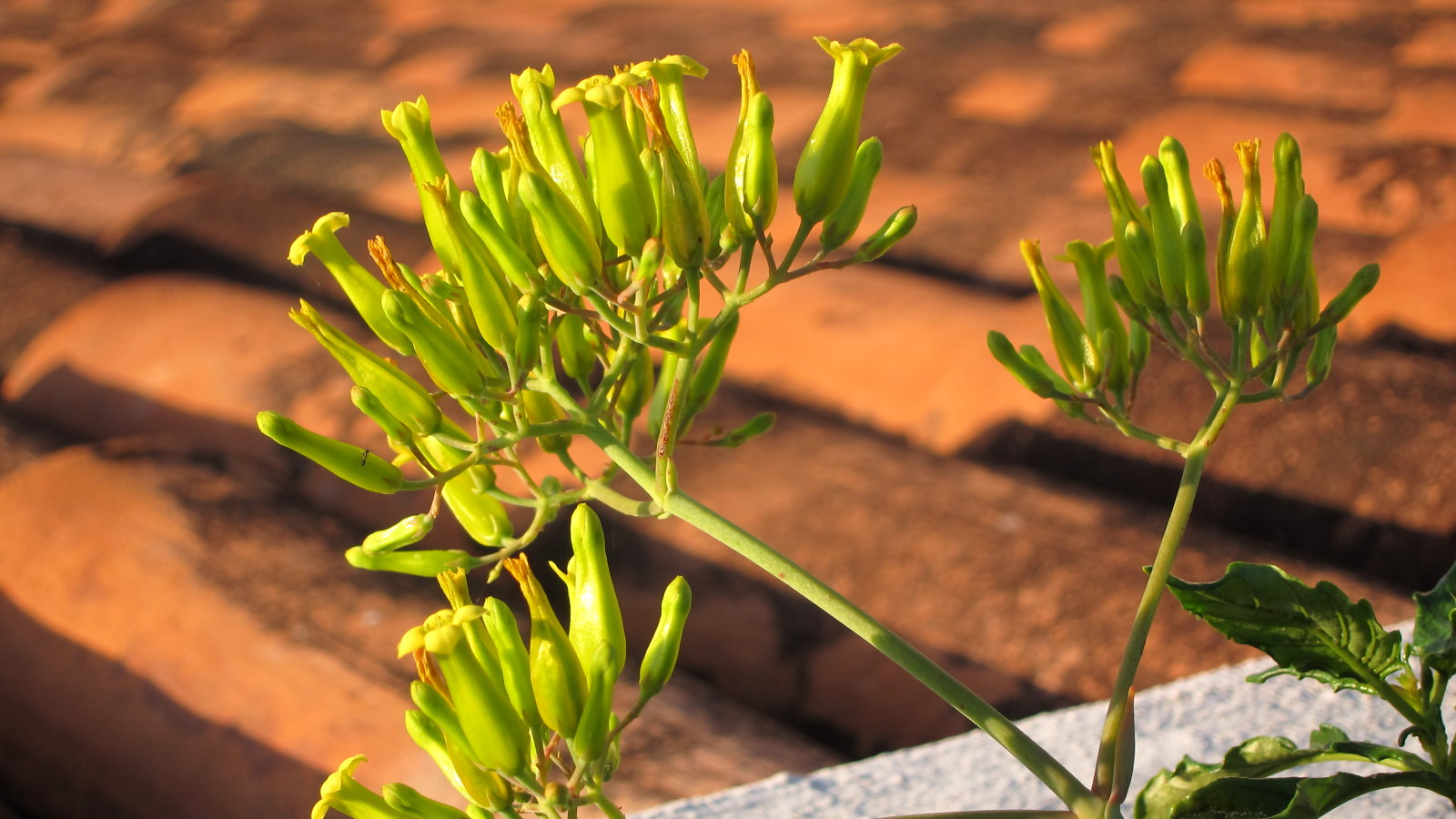
Budding flowers.

Heat and drought tolerant, its leaves can transform from a deep green to crimson depending on the environment. A thin shrub up to 400mm high, its quadrangular, fleshy but woody-based, branches lie on the ground with its tips growing upward. Having fibrous roots, its leaves are fleshy and limpet shell-shaped with rounded tip and teeth, and the base is wedge-shaped. The leaves are a showy, light, bluish grey-green, cloaked in a waxy blossom, with the edges and aged leaves being pinkish to reddish brown.

Yellow flowers appear on its capitulum between late autumn and winter, which are made up of four petals coalesced into a lengthened tube 11-14mm long with disseminating, thin triangular lobes 2-3mm long.

The plant can be confused with Kalanchoe sexangularis, but should be differentiated by its four-angled stems, grey patelliform leaves, and its longer corolla tube. Furthermore, the stems of K. sexangularis are cylindrical to irregularly ridged and its corolla tube is 7-10mm long.

== Cultivation ==
Appropriate for containers, rock gardens, groundcover, prolonged walls and arid gardens, the plant would grow well on well-drained porous soil in clay pots and would need abundance of airflow, bright light or full sun. It is to be watered when its soil is dry to the touch and it must be protected from frost. If grown in a cooler, shadier spot, the plant will not display the ruddy colouration of the leaf tips as powerfully, and it will also incline to have larger leaves. Moreover, routine watering and feeding with compost will make the plant sturdier and a rapid grower.

=== Propagation ===
Propagated by cuttings, it can be planted immediately in the soil or instantly in the garden and will root without the need of rooting hormone or mist. The plant is easily propagated by a single leaf and a fallen stem piece on the ground would root promptly on soil. This is an adaptation to survive treading by surrounding animals, or rocks falling on them.
