= Strawberry saxifrage =

Strawberry saxifrage is a common name for several plants and may refer to:

- Saxifraga stolonifera, broadly distributed in the northern hemisphere
- Saxifragopsis fragarioides, native to western North America
