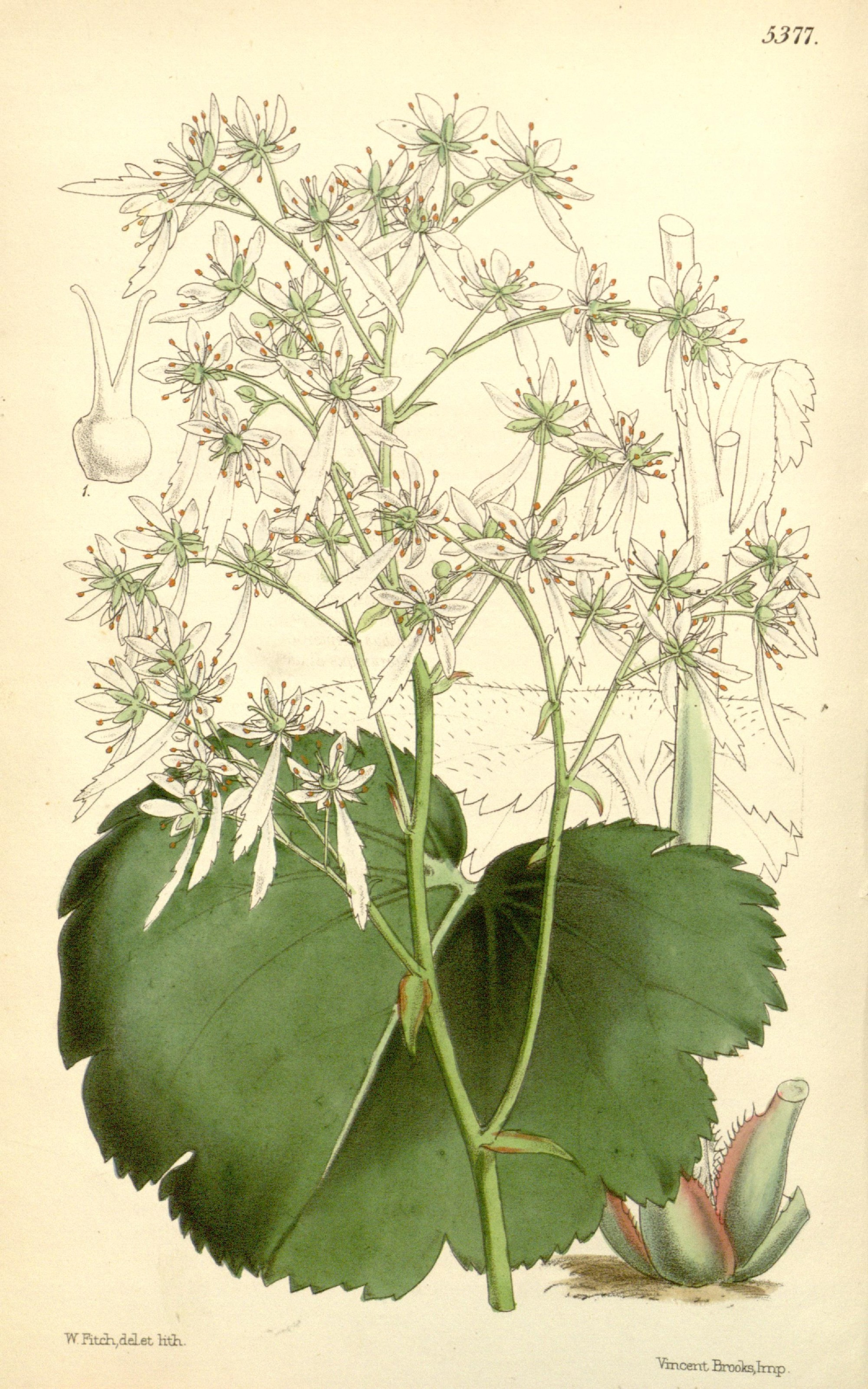

Scientific classification
- Kingdom: Plantae
- Clade: Tracheophytes
- Clade: Angiosperms
- Clade: Eudicots
- Order: Saxifragales
- Family: Saxifragaceae
- Genus: Saxifraga
- Species: S. fortunei

Binomial name
- Saxifraga fortunei Hook.

= Saxifraga fortunei =

Species of flowering plant

Saxifraga fortunei (齿瓣虎耳草), the fortune saxifrage, is a species of flowering plant in the family Saxifragaceae, native to China, Japan and Korea. Growing to just 40 cm (16 in) tall and broad, it is a shade-loving herbaceous perennial with large round fleshy leaves. Slender branched stalks bear panicles of small white starry flowers in summer. The two lower petals of each bloom are significantly longer than the others. Both the flowers and the leaves are sometimes flushed red or pink.

== Cultivation ==
As a garden plant, Saxifraga fortunei flourishes in deep or partial shade, in soil which is well-drained but reliably moist. It has gained the Royal Horticultural Society's Award of Garden Merit. S. fortunei is a parent of many hybrids and cultivars, some of which have also won this award:-

- 'Angelina Johnson'
- 'Blackberry and Apple Pie'
- 'Conwy Snow'
- 'Moe'
- 'Mount Nachi'
- 'Pink Haze'
- 'Rokujo'
- 'Shiranami'
- 'Sue Drew'
- Sugar Plum Fairy='Toujya'

== Lower Taxa ==
- Saxifraga fortunei var. fortunei
- Saxifraga fortunei var. koraiensis Nakai
