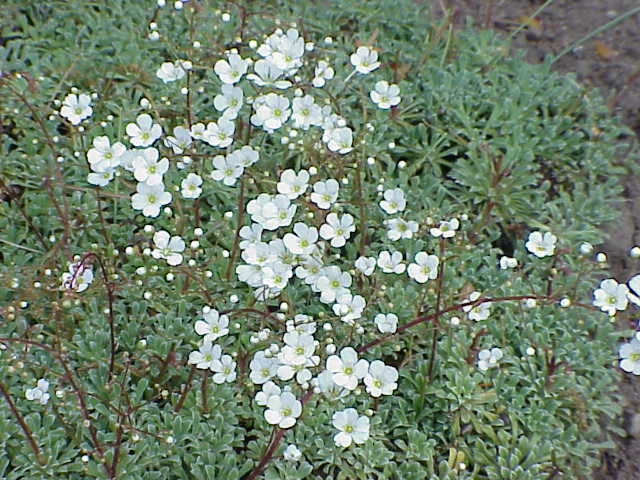
- Saxifraga cochlearis

Scientific classification
- Kingdom: Plantae
- Clade: Embryophytes
- Clade: Tracheophytes
- Clade: Angiosperms
- Clade: Eudicots
- Order: Saxifragales
- Family: Saxifragaceae
- Genus: Saxifraga; Tourn. ex L. (1753)

Type species
- Saxifraga granulata L.

Sections
- See text

Synonyms
- Synonyms: Adenogyna Raf. (1836), nom. superfl.; Antiphylla Haw. (1821); Aphomonix Raf. (1837); Boecherarctica Á.Löve (1984); Chondrosea Haw. (1821); Ciliaria Haw. (1821); Cymbalariella Nappi (1903); Dactyloides Nieuwl. (1915), nom. superfl.; Diptera Borkh. (1794), nom. superfl.; Ditriclita Raf. (1836), nom. nud.; Evaiezoa Raf. (1837); Geryonia Schrank ex Hoppe (1818); Geum Mill. (1754), nom. illeg.; Hirculus Haw. (1821); Kingstonia Gray (1821 publ. 1822); Leptasea Haw. (1821); Ligularia Duval (1809), nom. superfl.; Lobaria Haw. (1821), nom. illeg.; Miscopetalum Haw. (1812); Muscaria Haw. (1821); Oreosplenium Zahlbr. ex Endl.(1839), pro syn.; Ponista Raf. (1837); Robertsonia Haw. (1812); Rupifraga L. ex Raf. (1837), nom. superfl.; Saxifragella Engl. (1891); Sekika Medik. (1791); Tridactylites Haw. (1821); Tristylea Jord. & Fourr. (1870); Tulorima Raf. (1837); Zahlbrucknera Rchb. (1832)

= Saxifraga =

Genus of flowering plants

Saxifraga is the largest genus in the family Saxifragaceae, containing about 473 species of holarctic perennial plants, known as saxifrages or rockfoils. The Latin word saxifraga means literally "stone-breaker", from Latin saxum ("rock" or "stone") + frangere ("to break"). It is usually thought to indicate a medicinal use for treatment of urinary calculi (known as kidney or bladder stones), rather than breaking rocks apart.

== Description ==
Most saxifrages are small perennial, biennial (e.g., S. adscendens) or annual (e.g., S. tridactylites) herbaceous plants whose basal or cauline leaves grow close to the ground, often in a rosette. The leaves typically have a more or less incised margin; they may be succulent, needle-like and/or hairy, reducing evaporation.

The inflorescence or single flower clusters rise above the main plant body on naked stalks. The small actinomorphic hermaphrodite flowers have five petals and sepals and are usually white, but red to yellow in some species. Stamens, usually ten, rarely eight, insert at the junction of the floral tube and ovary wall, with filaments subulate or clavate. As in other primitive eudicots, some of the five or ten stamens may appear petal-like. It lives in tundral ecosystems.

== Taxonomy ==
A genus of about 473 species. The former monotypic genus Saxifragella has been submersed within Saxifraga, the largest genus in Saxifragaceae, as Saxifraga bicuspidata. Also, the genus Saxifragopsis (strawberry saxifrage) was previously included in Saxifraga.

=== Subdivision ===
Based on morphological criteria, up to 15 sections were recognised. Subsequent molecular phylogenetic studies reduced this to 13 sections with 9 subsections. The former sections Micranthes and Merkianae are more closely related to the Boykinia and Heuchera clades. Modern floras separate these groups as the genus Micranthes.

The thirteen sections (with subsections) are:

- Irregulares
- Saxifragella
- Pseudocymbalaria
- Bronchiales
- Ciliatae
- Cymbalaria
- Cotylea
- Gymnopera
- Mesogyne
- Trachyphyllum
- Ligulatae
- Porphyrion
  - Squarrosae
  - Mutatae
  - Oppositifoliae
  - Florulentae
  - Kabschia
- Saxifraga
  - Tridactylites
  - Androsaceae
  - Arachnoideae
  - Saxifraga

=== Selected species ===
As of August 2026, 476 species and many hybrids are accepted.

- Saxifraga adscendens L. – ascending saxifrage
- Saxifraga aizoides L. – Yellow mountain saxifrage, yellow saxifrage
- Saxifraga anadyrensis Losinsk.
- Saxifraga androsacea L.
- Saxifraga aquatica Lapeyr.
- Saxifraga arachnoidea Sternb.
- Saxifraga × arendsii Engl. – mossy saxifrage, mossy rockfoil (artificial hybrid of S. hypnoides × S. moschata × S. rosacea)
- Saxifraga aspera L. – rough saxifrage, stiff-haired saxifrage
- Saxifraga bicuspidata Hook.f.
- Saxifraga biflora All.
- Saxifraga brachypoda D.Don
- Saxifraga bronchialis L. – matte saxifrage
- Saxifraga bryoides L. – mossy saxifrage
- Saxifraga burseriana L. – AGM
- Saxifraga caesia L. – blue green saxifrage
- Saxifraga callosa Sm. – limestone saxifrage
- Saxifraga canaliculata Boiss. & Reut. ex Engl.
- Saxifraga carpatica Sternb.
- Saxifraga cernua L. – drooping saxifrage, nodding saxifrage, bulblet saxifrage
- Saxifraga cespitosa L. – tufted saxifrage
- Saxifraga cochlearis Rchb. – spoon-leaved saxifrage
- Saxifraga columnaris Schmalh.
- Saxifraga corsica (Ser.) Gren. & Godr.
- Saxifraga consanguinea W.W.Sm.
- Saxifraga cotyledon L. – great alpine rockfoil, greater evergreen saxifrage
- Saxifraga crustata Vest. – crusted-leaved saxifraga, silver saxifrage, encrusted saxifrage
- Saxifraga cuneifolia L. – shield-leaved saxifrage, lesser London pride
- Saxifraga cymbalaria L. – celandine saxifrage
- Saxifraga dinnikii Schmalh.
- Saxifraga duthiei Gand.
- Saxifraga eschscholtzii Sternb. – cushion saxifrage
- Saxifraga exarata Vill. – furrowed saxifrage
- Saxifraga federici-augusti Biasol.
- Saxifraga flagellaris Willd. ex Sternb. – whiplash saxifrage, spider saxifrage, "spider plant"
- Saxifraga florulenta Moretti
- Saxifraga fortunei Hook.f. – fortune saxifrage
- Saxifraga × geum L. – Robertsoniana saxifrage (S. hirsuta x S. umbrosa)
- Saxifraga globulifera Desf. – Gibraltar saxifrage
- Saxifraga granulata L. – meadow saxifrage, bulbous saxifrage, fair maids of France (type species)
- Saxifraga hederacea L.
- Saxifraga hirculus L. – yellow marsh saxifrage, marsh saxifrage, "bog saxifrage"
- Saxifraga hirsuta L. – kidney saxifrage
- Saxifraga hyperborea R.Br. – pygmy saxifrage
- Saxifraga hypnoides L. – mossy saxifrage, Dovedale moss
- Saxifraga juniperifolia Adams
- Saxifraga korshinskii Kom.
- Saxifraga lactea Turcz.
- Saxifraga longifolia Lapeyr. – Pyrenean saxifrage
- Saxifraga maderensis D.Don – Madeira saxifrage, Madeira breakstone
- Saxifraga marginata Sternb.
- Saxifraga moschata Wulfen – musky saxifrage, mossy saxifrage
- Saxifraga muscoides All.
- Saxifraga mutata L.
- Saxifraga nathorstii (Dusén) Hayek – East Greenland saxifrage
- Saxifraga nipponica Makino
- Saxifraga oppositifolia L. – purple saxifrage, purple mountain saxifrage
- Saxifraga osloensis Knaben – Oslo saxifrage, a natural hybrid species
- Saxifraga paniculata Mill. – lifelong saxifrage, white mountain saxifrage
- Saxifraga paradoxa Sternb. – Fragile saxifraga
- Saxifraga petraea L.
- Saxifraga platysepala (= S. flagellaris auct. non Willd.) – broadsepal saxifrage
- Saxifraga porophylla Bertol.
- Saxifraga rivularis L. – alpine brook saxifrage, brook saxifrage, highland saxifrage
- Saxifraga rosacea Moench – Irish saxifrage
- Saxifraga rotundifolia L. – round-leaved saxifrage
- Saxifraga roylei Harry Sm.
- Saxifraga rudolphiana Hornsch.
- Saxifraga rufescens Balf.f.
- Saxifraga rufopilosa – redhair saxifrage
- Saxifraga sancta Griseb.
- Saxifraga serpyllifolia Pursh – thymeleaf saxifrage
- Saxifraga sibirica L. – Siberian saxifrage
- Saxifraga spathularis Brot. – Saint Patrick's cabbage
- Saxifraga squarrosa Sieber – Dolomites saxifrage
- Saxifraga stolonifera Curtis – creeping saxifrage, strawberry saxifrage, creeping rockfoil, strawberry begonia, strawberry geranium, Aaron's beard
  - Saxifraga stolonifera f. aptera (Makino) H.Hara – hoshizaki-yukinoshita (Japanese)
  - Saxifraga stolonifera 'Cuscutiformis' (Saxifraga cuscutiformis Lodd.) – Dodder-like saxifrage
- Saxifraga subverticillata Boiss.
- Saxifraga svalbardensis Øvstedal
- Saxifraga taygetea Boiss. & Heldr.
- Saxifraga taylorii Calder & Savile – Taylor's saxifrage
- Saxifraga tenella Wulfen
- Saxifraga tombeanensis Boiss. ex Engl.
- Saxifraga tricuspidata Rottb. – prickly saxifrage
- Saxifraga tridactylites L. – rue-leaved saxifrage, "nailwort"
- Saxifraga trifurcata Schrad.
- Saxifraga umbrosa L. – Pyrenean saxifrage
- Saxifraga × urbium D.A.Webb – London pride (artificial hybrid of S. spathularis × S. umbrosa)
- Saxifraga vandelli Sternb.
- Saxifraga wahlenbergii Ball

=== Formerly placed here ===
Plants formerly placed in Saxifraga are mainly but not exclusively Saxifragaceae. They include:

- Astilboides tabularis, as S. tabularis
- Bergenia crassifolia, as S. cordifolia, S. crassifolia
- Bergenia pacumbis, as S. ligulata, S. pacumbis
- Bergenia purpurascens, as S. delavayi, S. purpurascens
- Boykinia jamesii, as S. jamesii
- Boykinia occidentalis (Coastal Brookfoam), as S. elata
- Boykinia richardsonii (Richardson's Brookfoam), as S. richardsonii
- Darmera peltata (Indian Rhubarb), as S. peltata
- Leptarrhena pyrolifolia, as S. pyrolifolia
- Luetkea pectinata (Partridgefoot), as S. pectinata
- Micranthes, including:
  - Micranthes integrifolia (wholeleaf saxifrage)
  - Micranthes howellii (Howell's saxifrage), as S. howellii
  - Micranthes mertensiana (Bong.) Rosend., as S. mertensiana
  - Micranthes stellaris (Starry saxifrage), as S. stellaris
- Mukdenia rossii (Mukdenia), as S. rossii

=== Other "saxifragous" plants ===
Several plant genera have names referring to saxifrages, although they might not be close relatives of Saxifraga. They include:

- Golden-saxifrages, Chrysosplenium
- Burnet-saxifrages, Pimpinella
- Pepper-saxifrage, Silaum silaus. The name "silaum" comes from the Latin word sil, which means yellow ochre. This refers to the sulphurous yellow colour of the flowers.

Some plants refer to Saxifraga in their generic names or specific epithets, either because they are also "rock-breaking" or because they resemble members of the saxifrage genus:

- Campanula saxifraga
- Celmisia saxifraga (Benth.) W.M.Curtis
- Cineraria saxifraga DC.
- Dryopteris saxifraga
- Petrorhagia saxifraga – Tunicflower
- Pimpinella saxifraga – Burnet saxifrage
- Ptychotis saxifraga
- Saxifragella
- Saxifragodes
- Saxifragopsis Small

== Ecology ==
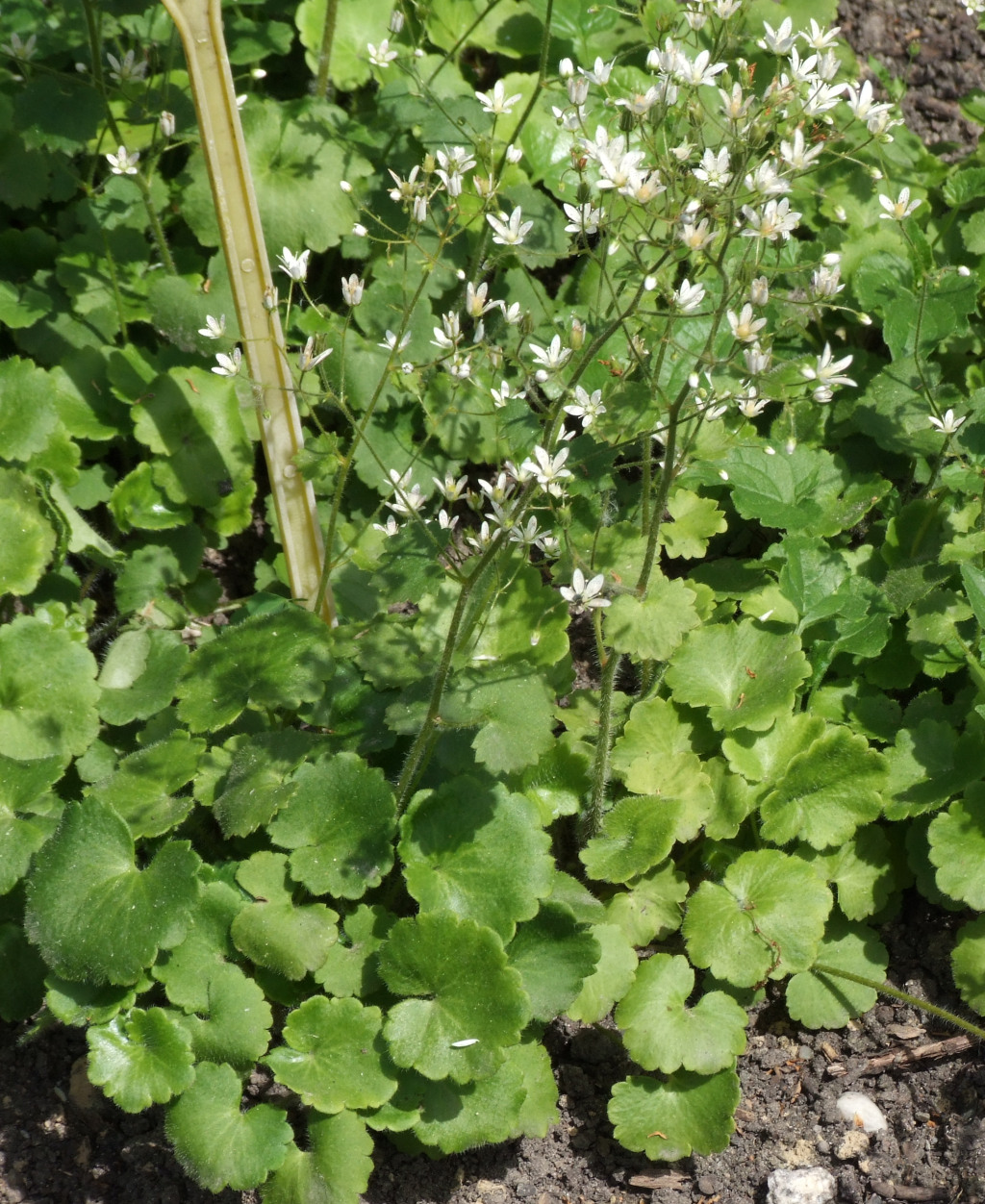
Round-leaved saxifrage (S. rotundifolia), whose sticky leaves seem to catch small invertebrates

Saxifrages are typical inhabitants of Arctic–alpine ecosystems, and are hardly ever found outside the temperate parts of the Northern Hemisphere; most members of this genus are found in subarctic climates. A good number of species grow in glacial habitats, such as S. biflora which can be found some 4,000 m (13,000 ft) above sea level in the Alps, or the East Greenland saxifrage (S. nathorstii). The genus is also abundant in the Eastern and Western Himalayan alpine shrub and meadows. Though the archetypal saxifrage is a small plant huddling between rocks high up on a mountain, many species do not occur in such a habitat and are larger (though still rather delicate) plants found on wet meadows.

Various Saxifraga species are used as food plants by the caterpillars of some butterflies and moths, such as the Phoebus Apollo (Parnassius phoebus).

Charles Darwin – erroneously believing Saxifraga to be allied to the sundew family (Droseraceae) – suspected the sticky-leaved round-leaved saxifrage (S. rotundifolia), rue-leaved saxifrage (S. tridactylites) and Pyrenean saxifrage (S. umbrosa) to be protocarnivorous plants, and conducted some experiments whose results supported his observations. In 2026, Saxifraga candelabrum was confirmed to be carnivorous. The experiment used labelled Nitrogen-14 isotope-fed Drosophila which were placed on the sticky leaves. The proteins of the flies was broken down and the nitrogen was found to be absorbed into the plants to confirm carnivory.

== Cultivation ==
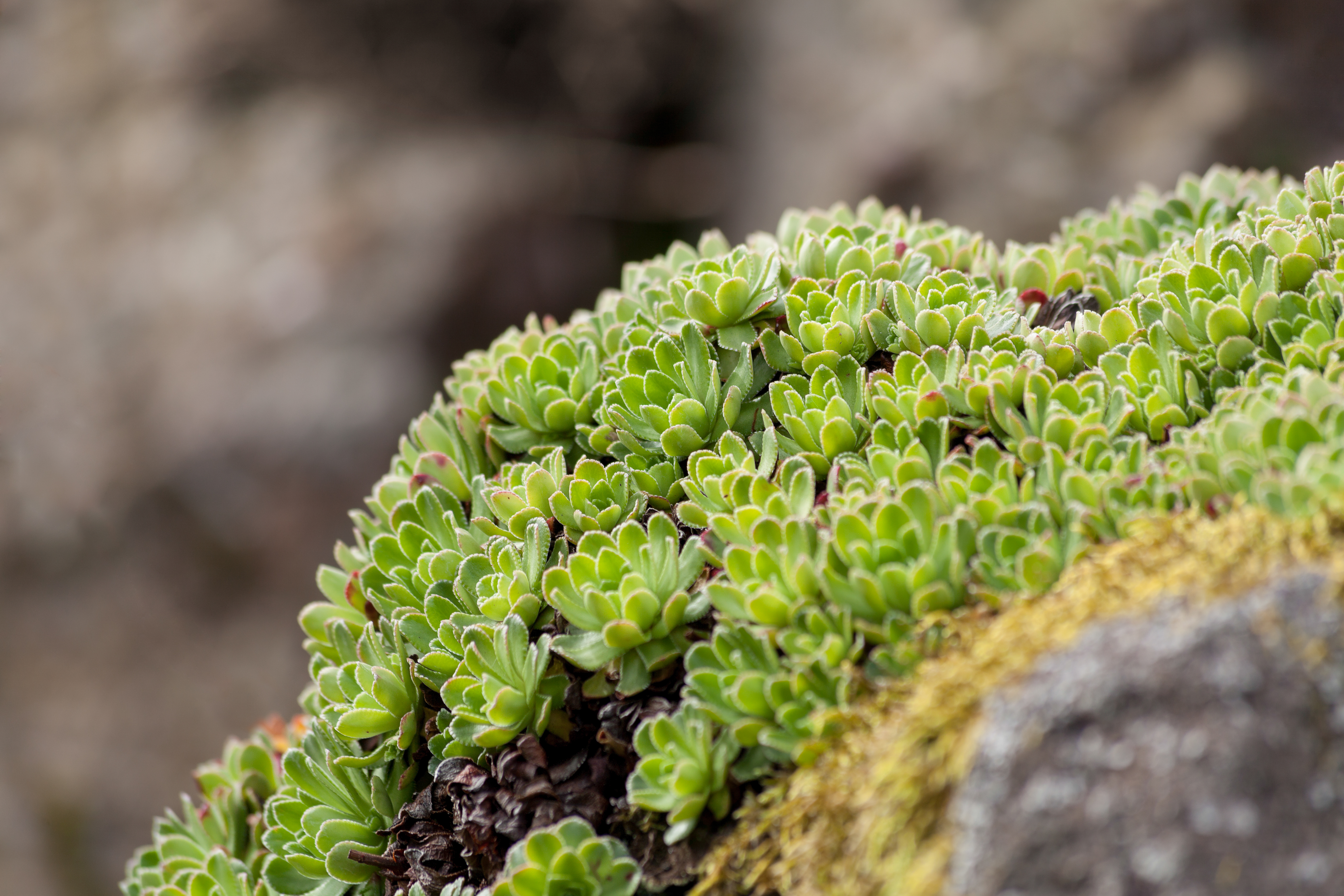
Saxifraga urumoffii at the Royal Botanic Garden Edinburgh

Numerous species and cultivars of saxifrage are cultivated as ornamental garden plants, valued particularly as groundcover or as cushion plants in rock gardens and alpine gardens. Many require alkaline or neutral soil to thrive.

S. × urbium (London pride), a hybrid between Pyrenean saxifrage (S. umbrosa) and St. Patrick's cabbage (S. spathularis), is commonly grown as an ornamental plant. Another horticultural hybrid is Robertsoniana saxifrage (S. × geum), derived from kidney saxifrage (S. hirsuta) and Pyrenean saxifrage. Some wild species are also used in gardening. Cambridge University Botanic Garden hosts the United Kingdom's national collection of saxifrages.

=== Award of Garden Merit ===
The following species and cultivars have gained the Royal Horticultural Society's Award of Garden Merit:-

- 'Angelina Johnson' (fortunei)
- 'Blackberry and Apple Pie' (fortunei)
- S. callosa (limestone saxifrage)
- 'Conwy Snow' (fortunei)
- 'Coolock Kate'
- 'Cumulus'
- S. fortunei
- 'Gregor Mendel' (× apiculata)
- 'Lagraveana' (paniculata)
- 'Lutea'
- 'Minor'
- 'Moe' (fortunei)
- 'Monarch'
- 'Mount Nachi' (fortunei)
- 'Peach Melba'
- 'Reginald Farrer' (Silver Farreri Group)
- 'Rokujo' (fortunei)
- 'Rosea'
- 'Shiranami' (fortunei)
- 'Slack's Ruby Southside' (Southside Seedling Group)
- 'Snowflake' (Silver Farreri Group)
- 'Southside Star' (Southside Seedling Group)
- S. stolonifera (strawberry saxifrage)
- 'Sue Drew' (fortunei)
- 'Sugar Plum Fairy'='Toujya' (fortunei)
- 'Theoden'
- 'Tumbling Waters'
- S. × urbium (London pride)
- 'Venetia' (paniculata)
- 'Whitehill'

== Uses ==
The leaves of some saxifrage species, such as creeping saxifrage (S. stolonifera) and S. pensylvanica, are edible. The former is a food in Korea and Japan. The flowers of purple saxifrage (S. oppositifolia) are eaten in Nunavut, Canada and the leaves and stems brewed as a tea.

Species are also used in traditional medicine, such as creeping saxifrage in East Asia and round-leaved saxifrage (S. rotundifolia) in Europe.

Two species—purple saxifrage and creeping saxifrage—are popular floral emblems. They are official flowers for:

- Nunavut, Canada - purple saxifrage
- County Londonderry, Northern Ireland - purple saxifrage
- Tsukuba, Japan - creeping saxifrage, "hoshizaki" form (S. stolonifera Curtis f. aptera)
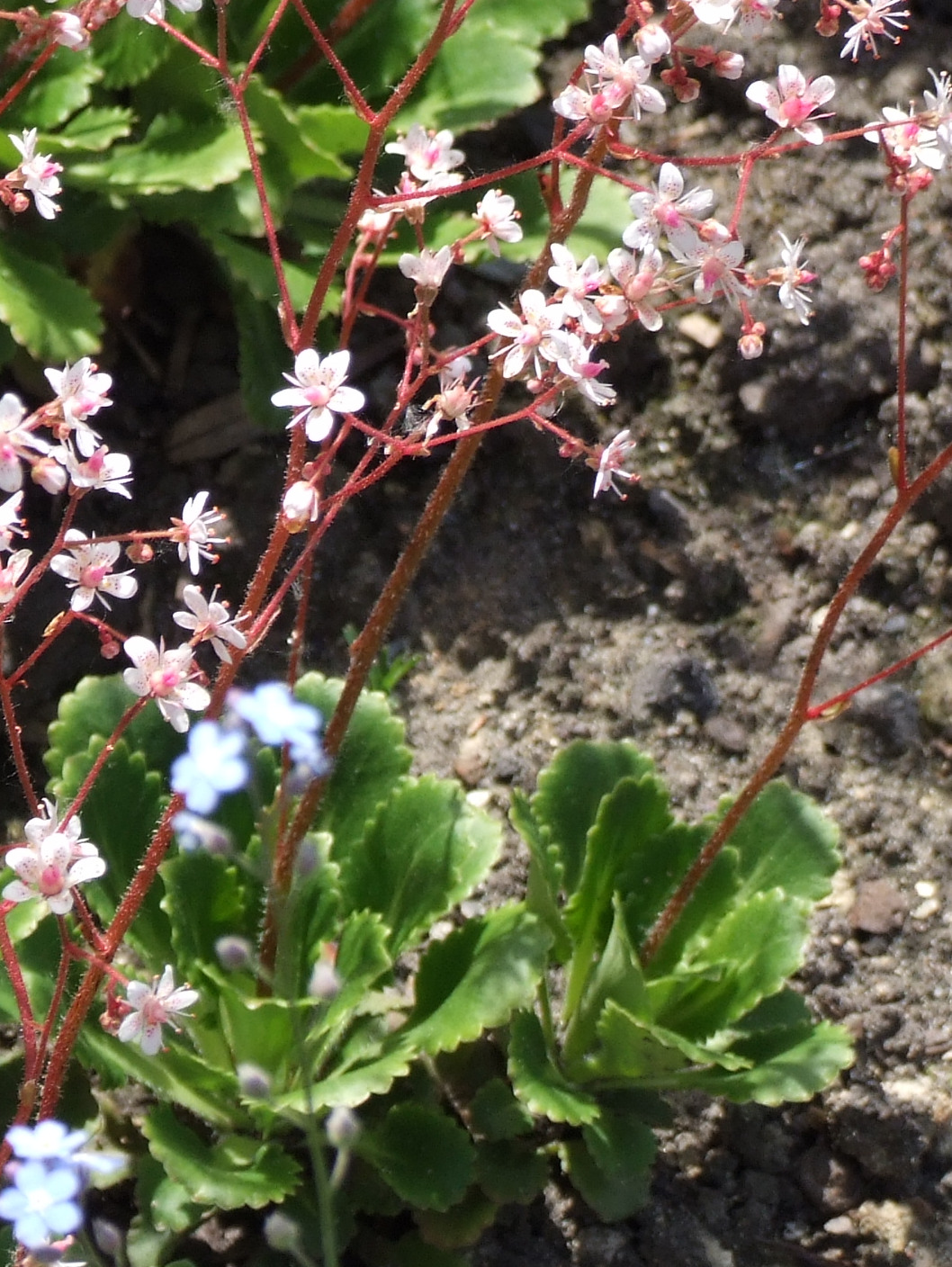
Pyrenean saxifrage (S. umbrosa), ancestor to horticultural hybrid saxifrages

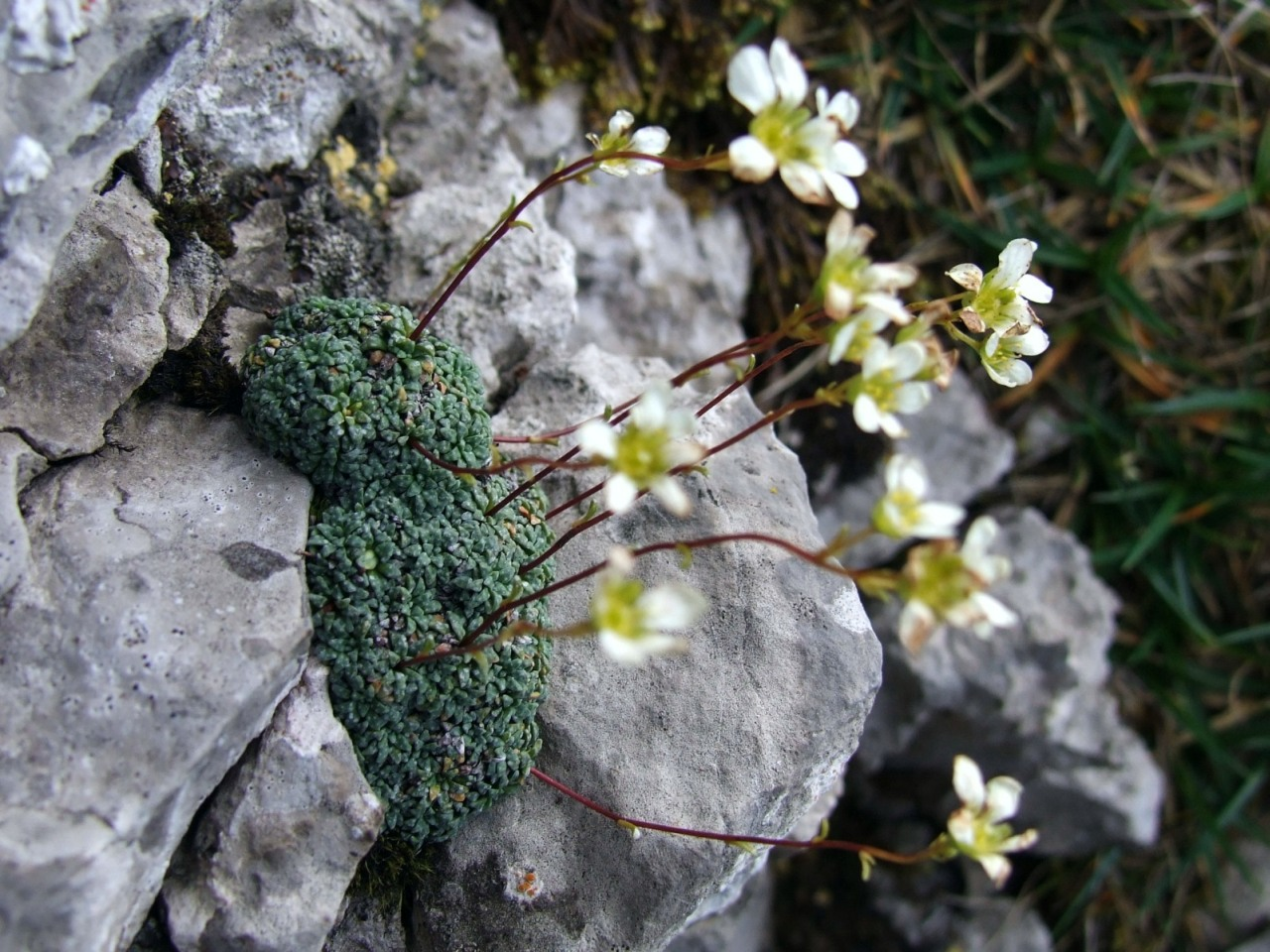
Saxifraga caesia

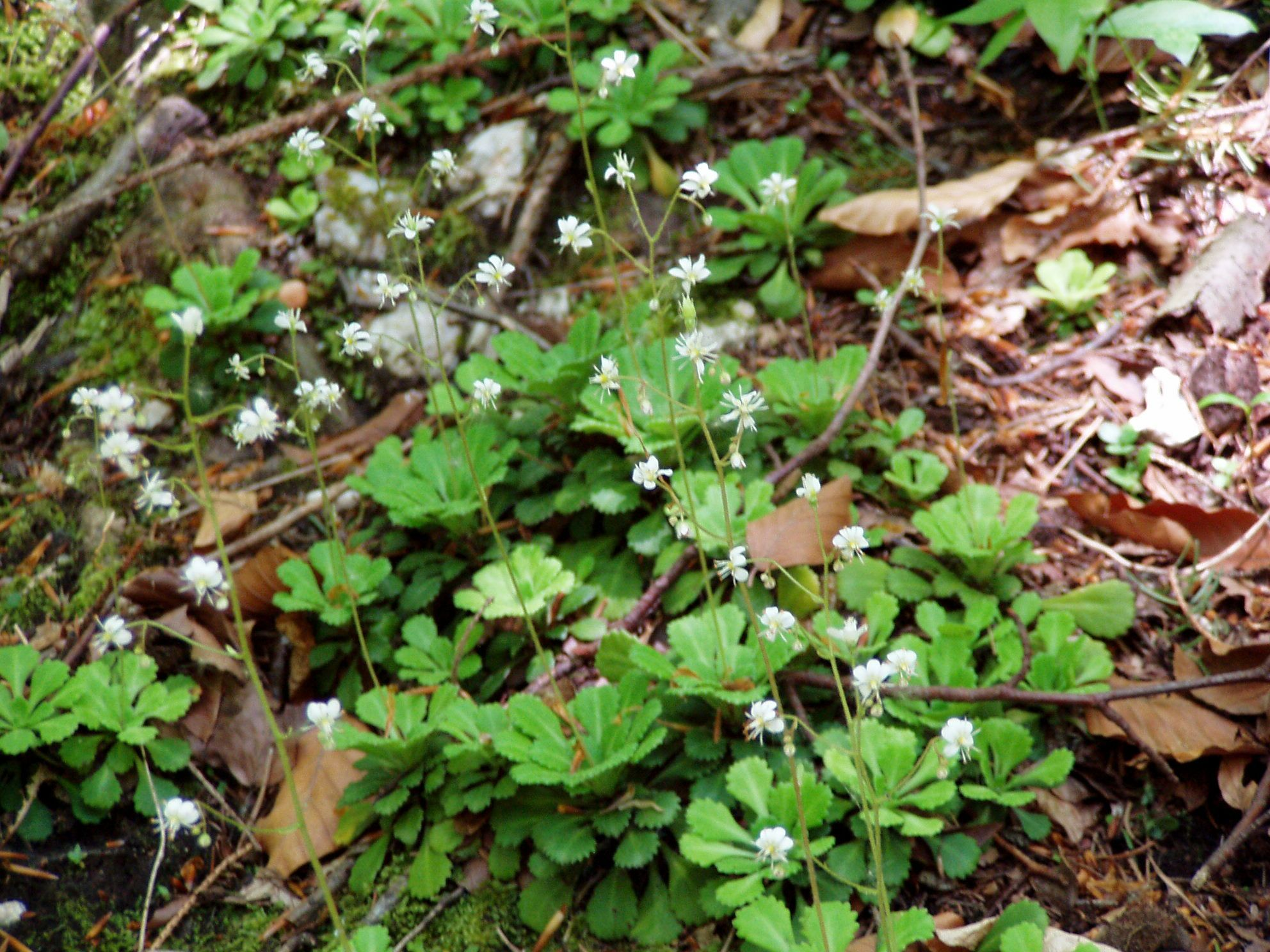
Lesser London pride (Saxifraga cuneifolia)

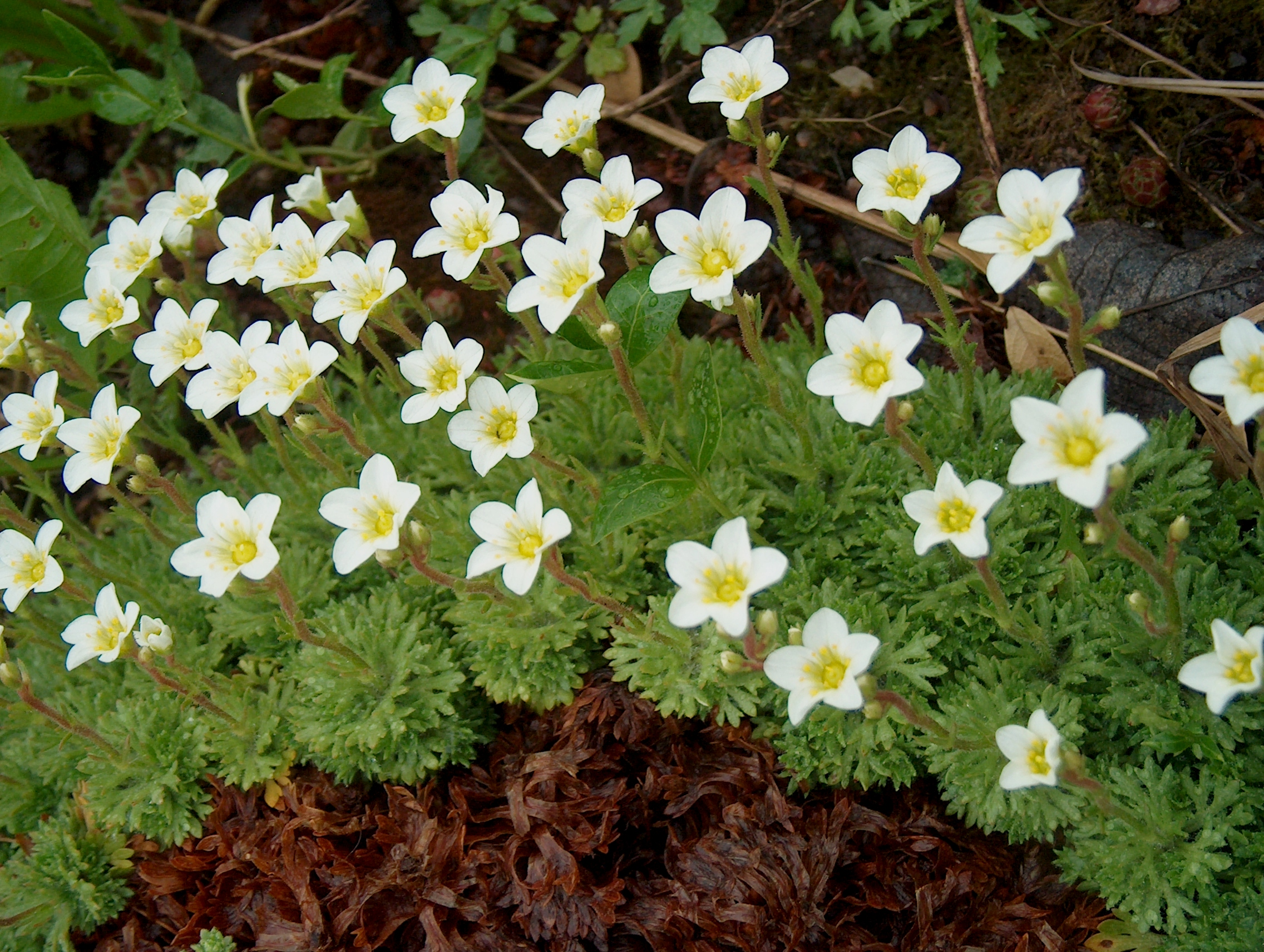
Saxifraga decipiens

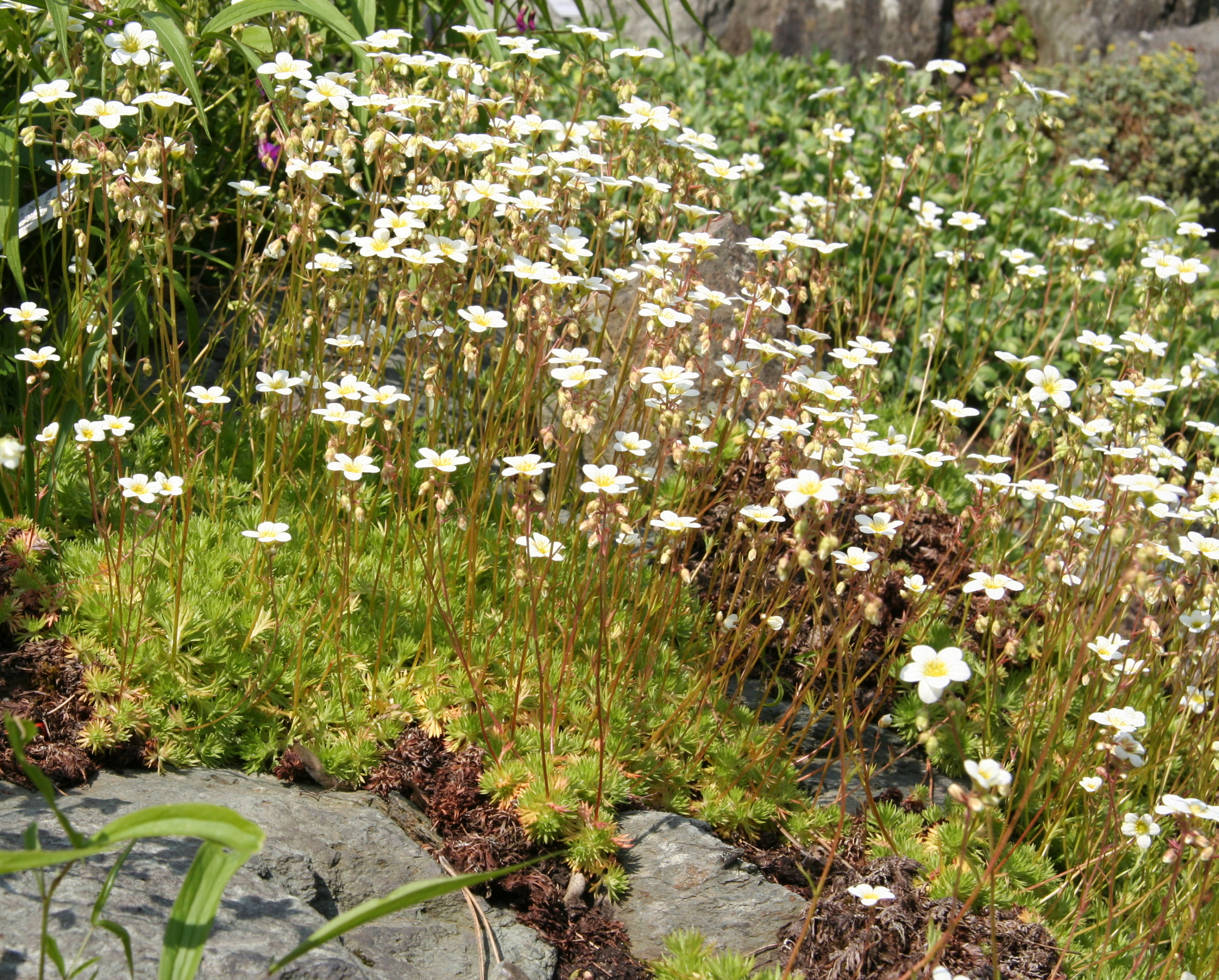
Irish saxifrage (Saxifraga rosacea)

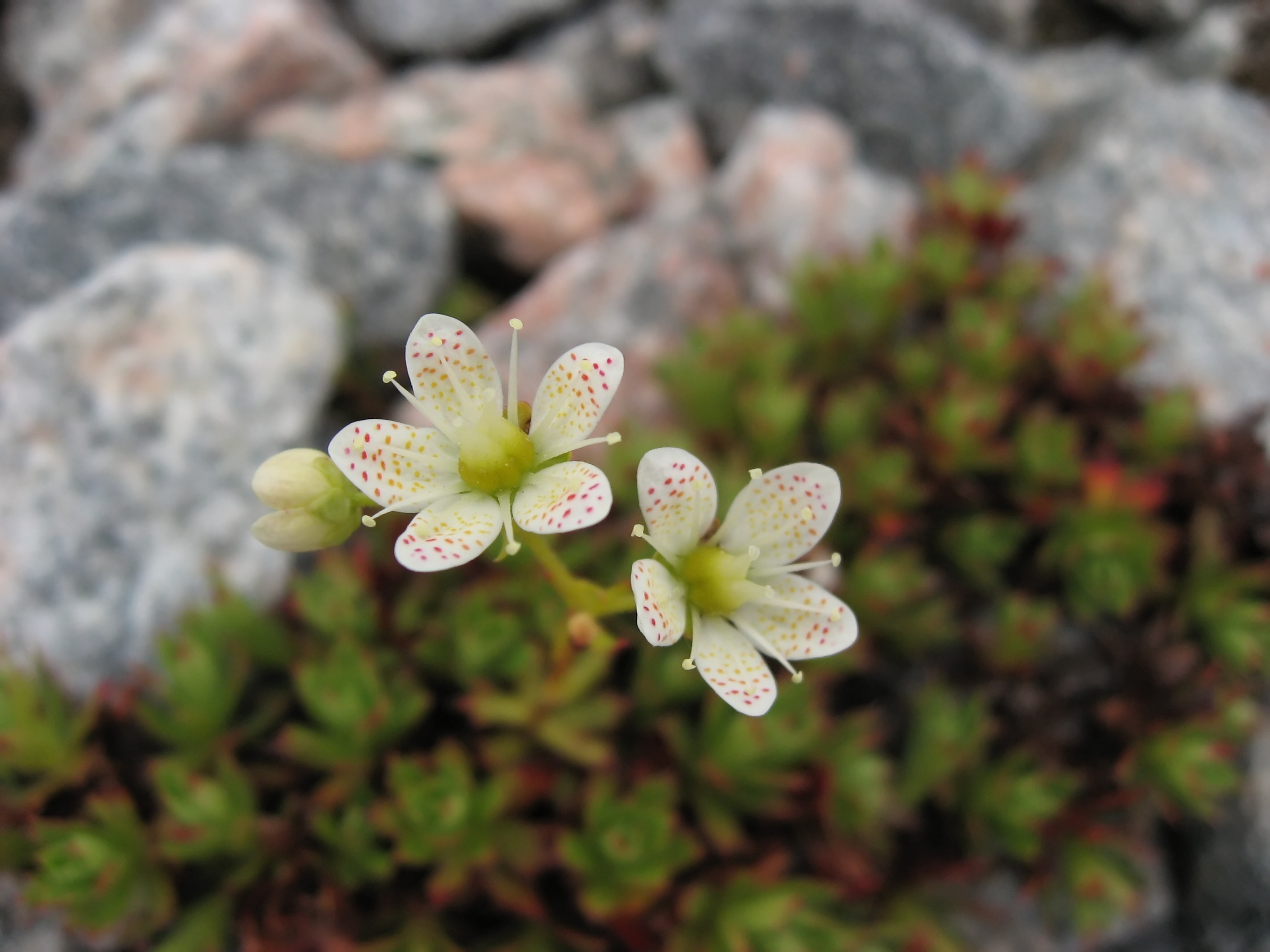
Prickly saxifrage (Saxifraga tricuspidata) flowers

== Bibliography ==
Books

- Gornall, RJ (2011) [1984]. "Saxifraga". In Cullen, James; Knees, Sabina G.; Cubey, H. Suzanne (eds.). The European Garden Flora Flowering Plants: A Manual for the Identification of Plants Cultivated in Europe, Both Out-of-Doors and Under Glass. Vol. III Angoiospermae - Dicotyledons (Resedaceae - Cyrillaceae) (2nd ed.). Cambridge University Press. pp. 102–131. ISBN 978-0-521-76155-0.
- Soltis, D E (2007). "Saxifragaceae". In Kubitzki, Klaus (ed.). Flowering Plants. Eudicots: Berberidopsidales, Buxales, Crossosomatales, Fabales p.p., Geraniales, Gunnerales, Myrtales p.p., Proteales, Saxifragales, Vitales, Zygophyllales, Clusiaceae Alliance, Passifloraceae Alliance, Dilleniaceae, Huaceae, Picramniaceae, Sabiaceae. The Families and Genera of Vascular Plants. Vol. IX. Springer. pp. 418–435. ISBN 978-3-540-32219-1.

Articles

- Chisholm, Hugh, ed. (1911). "Saxifrage" . Encyclopædia Britannica. Vol. 24 (11th ed.). Cambridge University Press. p. 264.
- Deng, Jia-bin; Drew, Bryan T.; Mavrodiev, Evgeny V.; Gitzendanner, Matthew A.; Soltis, Pamela S.; Soltis, Douglas E. (February 2015). "Phylogeny, divergence times, and historical biogeography of the angiosperm family Saxifragaceae". Molecular Phylogenetics and Evolution. 83: 86–98. Bibcode:2015MolPE..83...86D. doi:10.1016/j.ympev.2014.11.011. PMID 25479063.
- Gornall, Richard J. (December 1987). "An outline of a revised classification of Saxifraga L.". Botanical Journal of the Linnean Society. 95 (4): 273–292. doi:10.1111/j.1095-8339.1987.tb01860.x.
- Gornall, Richard J.; Ohba, Hideaki; Jintang, Pan (2000). "New Taxa, Names, and Combinations in the Saxifraga (Saxifragaceae) for the Flora of China". Novon. 10 (4): 375–377. Bibcode:2000Novon..10..375G. doi:10.2307/3392990. JSTOR 3392990.
- Soltis, Douglas E.; Kuzoff, Robert K.; Conti, Elena; Gornall, Richard; Ferguson, Keith (March 1996). "matK and rbcL Gene Sequence Data Indicate that Saxifraga (Saxifragaceae) is Polyphyletic". American Journal of Botany. 83 (3): 371. doi:10.2307/2446171. JSTOR 2446171.
- Tkach, Natalia; Röser, Martin; Miehe, Georg; Muellner-Riehl, Alexandra N.; Ebersbach, Jana; Favre, Adrien; Hoffmann, Matthias H. (31 December 2015). "Molecular phylogenetics, morphology and a revised classification of the complex genus Saxifraga (Saxifragaceae)". Taxon. 64 (6): 1159–1187. Bibcode:2015Taxon..64.1159T. doi:10.12705/646.4.

Websites

- POWO (2019). "Saxifraga Tourn. ex L." Plants of the World Online. Royal Botanic Gardens, Kew.
- WFO (2020). "Saxifraga L." World Flora Online.
- "The Saxifrage Society". 2020.

Floras

- Jintang, Pan; Gornall, Richard; Ohba, Hideaki (2004). "Saxifraga Linnaeus, Sp. Pl. 1: 398. 1753 (虎耳草属hu er cao shu)". p. 280., in Flora of China online vol. 8 see also PDF
- Brouillet, Luc; Elvander, Patrick E. (2008). "Saxifraga Linnaeus, Sp. Pl. 1: 398. 1753; Gen. Pl. ed. 5, 189. 1754". Flora of North America vol. 8. New York: Oxford University Press. pp. 43–146.
