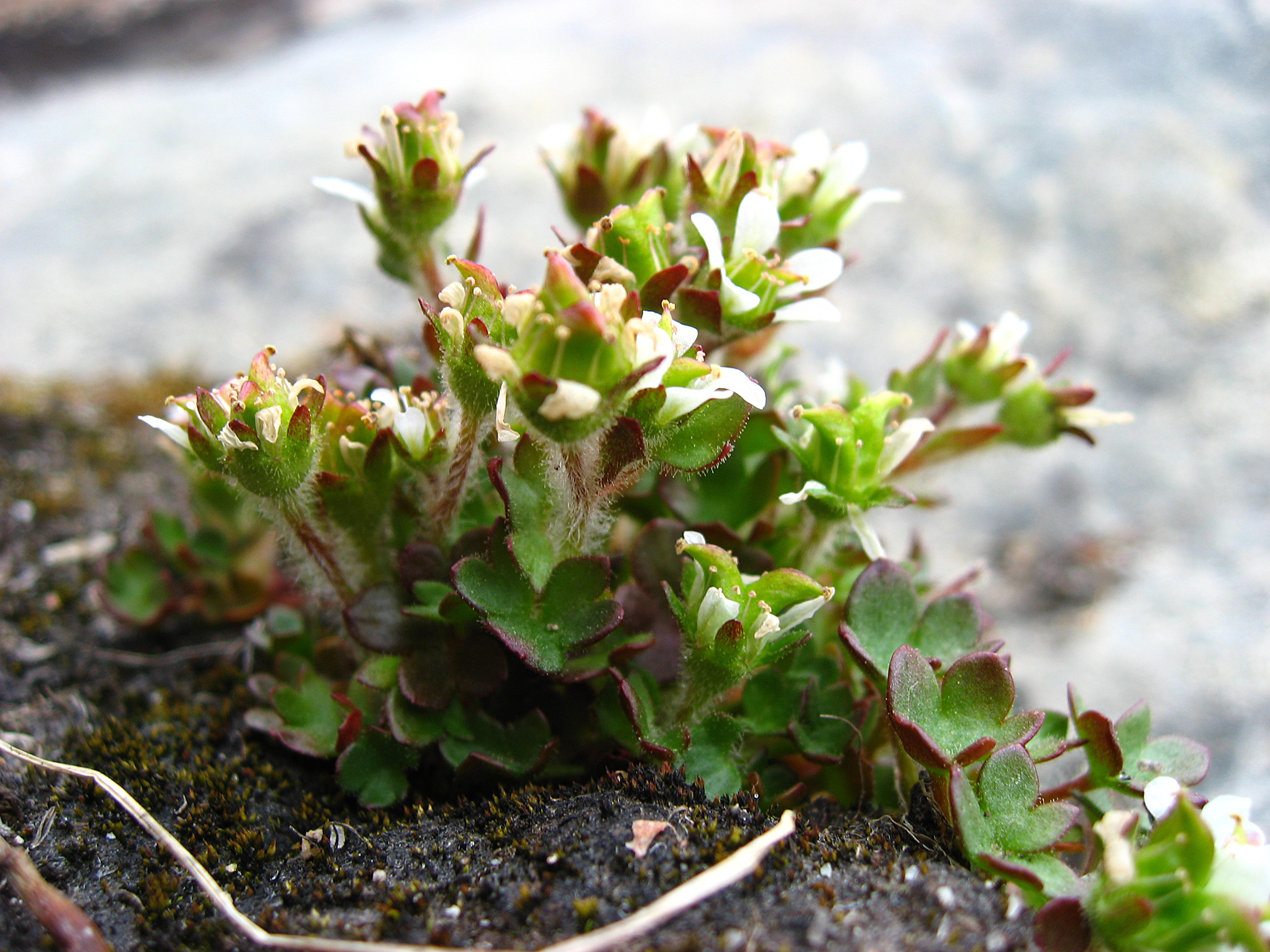
- Saxifraga hyperborea

Scientific classification
- Kingdom: Plantae
- Clade: Tracheophytes
- Clade: Angiosperms
- Clade: Eudicots
- Order: Saxifragales
- Family: Saxifragaceae
- Genus: Saxifraga
- Species: S. hyperborea

Binomial name
- Saxifraga hyperborea R. Br.

Synonyms
- Saxifraga cernua var. debilis (Engelm. ex A. Gray) Engl.; Saxifraga debilis Engelm.; Saxifraga flexuosa Sternb.; Saxifraga hyperborea subsp. debilis (Engelm.) Á.Löve, D.Löve & B.M.Kapoor; Saxifraga rivularis var. debilis (Engelm.) Dorn; Saxifraga rivularis subsp. hyperborea (R. Br.) Dorn; Saxifraga rivularis var. flexuosa (Sternb.) Engl. & Irmsch.; Saxifraga rivularis var. hyperborea (R. Br.) Hook.; Saxifraga rivularis var. purpurascens Lange

= Saxifraga hyperborea =

Pygmy saxifrage

Species of flowering plant

Saxifraga hyperborea, the pygmy saxifrage, is a plant species native to Canada, Alaska, Greenland, Russia, Spitsbergen, and from mountainous areas in the western United States. One report from Mount Washington in New Hampshire is unverified. The plant grows in wet tundra, snow banks, stream banks and lake sides at elevations up to 3000 m. The US populations have been called S. debilis or S. rivularis in various publications.

Saxifraga hyperborea is a small mat-forming herb sometimes appearing purple, with a woody caudex. Flowers are purple or white, up to 5 mm across.
