= Saxifraga consanguinea =

Scientific classification
- Kingdom: Plantae
- Clade: Tracheophytes
- Clade: Angiosperms
- Clade: Eudicots
- Order: Saxifragales
- Family: Saxifragaceae
- Genus: Saxifraga
- Species: S. consanguinea

Binomial name
- Saxifraga consanguinea W.W. Sm.

Synonyms
- Saxifraga propagulifera H. Sm.; Saxifraga muliensis Hand.-Mazz.; Hirculus propaguliferus (H. Sm.) Losinsk.

Species of flowering plant

Saxifraga consanguinea is a flowering plant species in the genus Saxifraga of the family Saxifragaceae.

== History ==
It was described by William Wright Smith.
