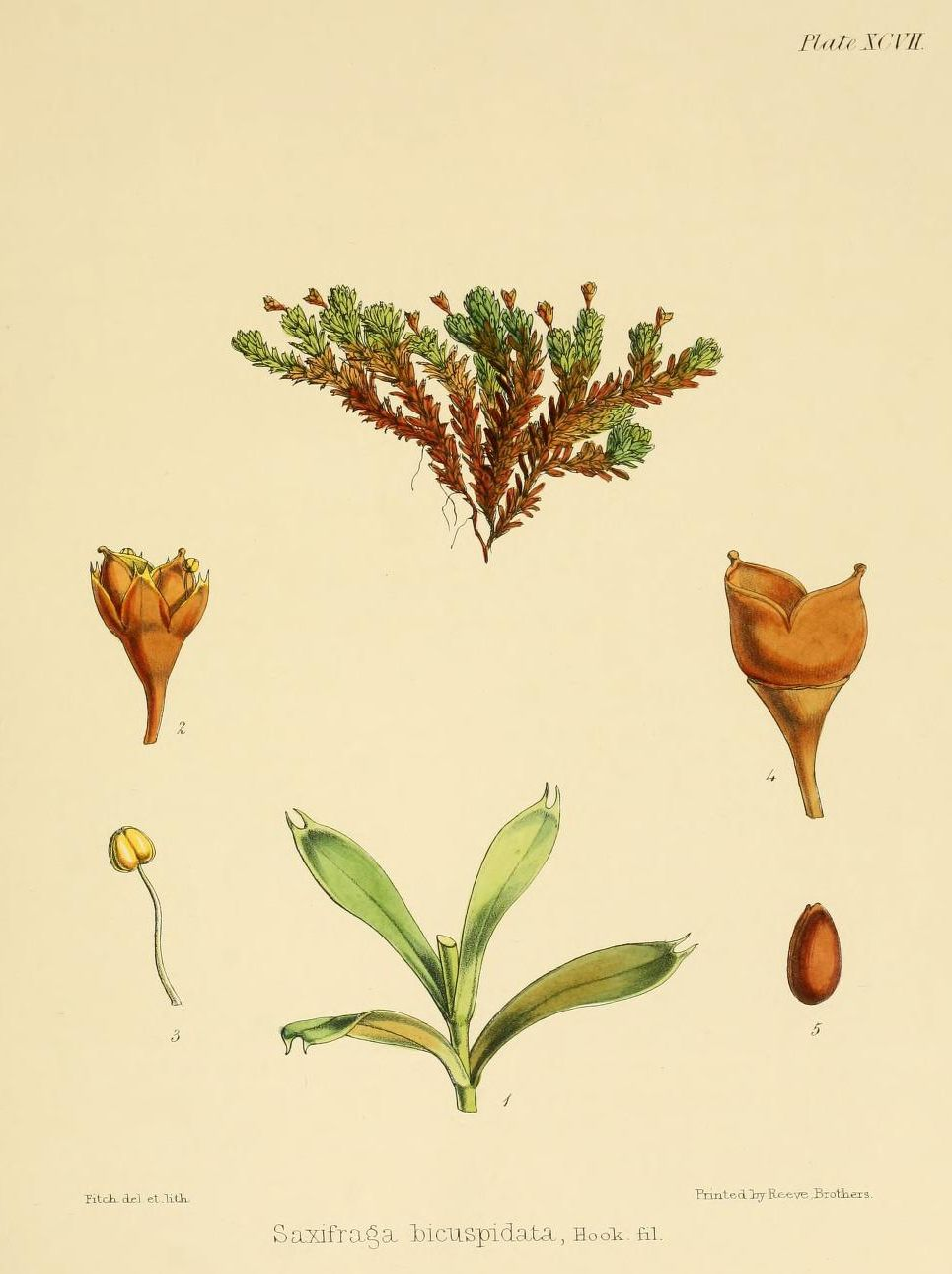
- Botanical illustration from Hooker's Flora Antarctica, 1844.

Scientific classification
- Kingdom: Plantae
- Clade: Tracheophytes
- Clade: Angiosperms
- Clade: Eudicots
- Order: Saxifragales
- Family: Saxifragaceae
- Genus: Saxifraga
- Species: S. bicuspidata

Binomial name
- Saxifraga bicuspidata Hook.f.

= Saxifraga bicuspidata =

Species of plant

Saxifraga bicuspidata is a species of flowering plant in the family Saxifragaceae. It is a perennial herb native to southern Chile and Argentina. In Chile, it is distributed between the Los Lagos and Magallanes regions.
