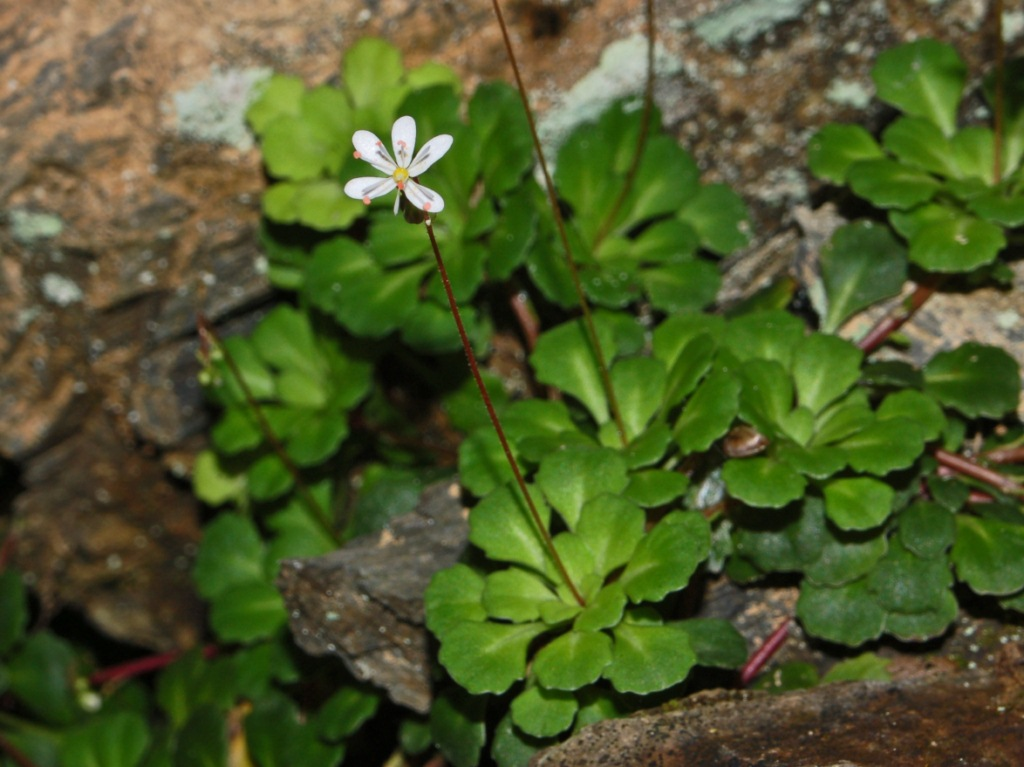

Scientific classification
- Kingdom: Plantae
- Clade: Tracheophytes
- Clade: Angiosperms
- Clade: Eudicots
- Order: Saxifragales
- Family: Saxifragaceae
- Genus: Saxifraga
- Species: S. cuneifolia

Binomial name
- Saxifraga cuneifolia L.

Synonyms
- Saxifraga cuneifolia subsp. robusta D.A. Webb

= Saxifraga cuneifolia =

Species of flowering plant

Saxifraga cuneifolia, the lesser Londonpride, shield-leaved saxifrage or spoon-leaved saxifrage, is a herbaceous perennial plant belonging to the Saxifragaceae family.

== Etymology ==
Saxifraga cuneifolia was first described by Carl Linnaeus in the 1759 10th edition of Systema Naturae. The Latin word "Saxifraga" means literally "stone-breaker", from Latin "saxum" meaning "stone" + "frangere" meaning "to break". It is usually explained by reference to certain saxifrages' ability to settle in the cracks of rocks. The species' Latin epithet cuneifolia means “wedge-shaped leaves”.

== Description ==
Saxifraga cuneifolia reaches on average 10–25 centimetres (4–10 in) in height. The stem is woody and creeping. The leaves are alternate and arranged in a basal rosette. They are fleshy and slightly leathery, wedge-shaped, obovate or roundish and notched on the margins. The flowers are gathered in a loose and irregularly branched inflorescence, with 5-15 flowers. The five petals are white, 2.5 to 4 mm long. The flowering period extends from May through July. Pollination is by insects. The fruit is a capsule.

== Distribution ==
Lesser Londonpride is a native of the mountains of central and southern Europe, from northwestern Spain over the Pyrenees, the Cevennes, the Alps and the Apennines, up to the eastern and southern Carpathians and the north of Croatia and Bosnia-Herzegovina.

== Habitat ==
This plant grows in woods (mainly beech or chestnut), on shaded rocks and boulders. It occurs mainly in humid areas with humus rich soil, at an altitude of 400–1,600 metres (1,300–5,200 ft) above sea level.
