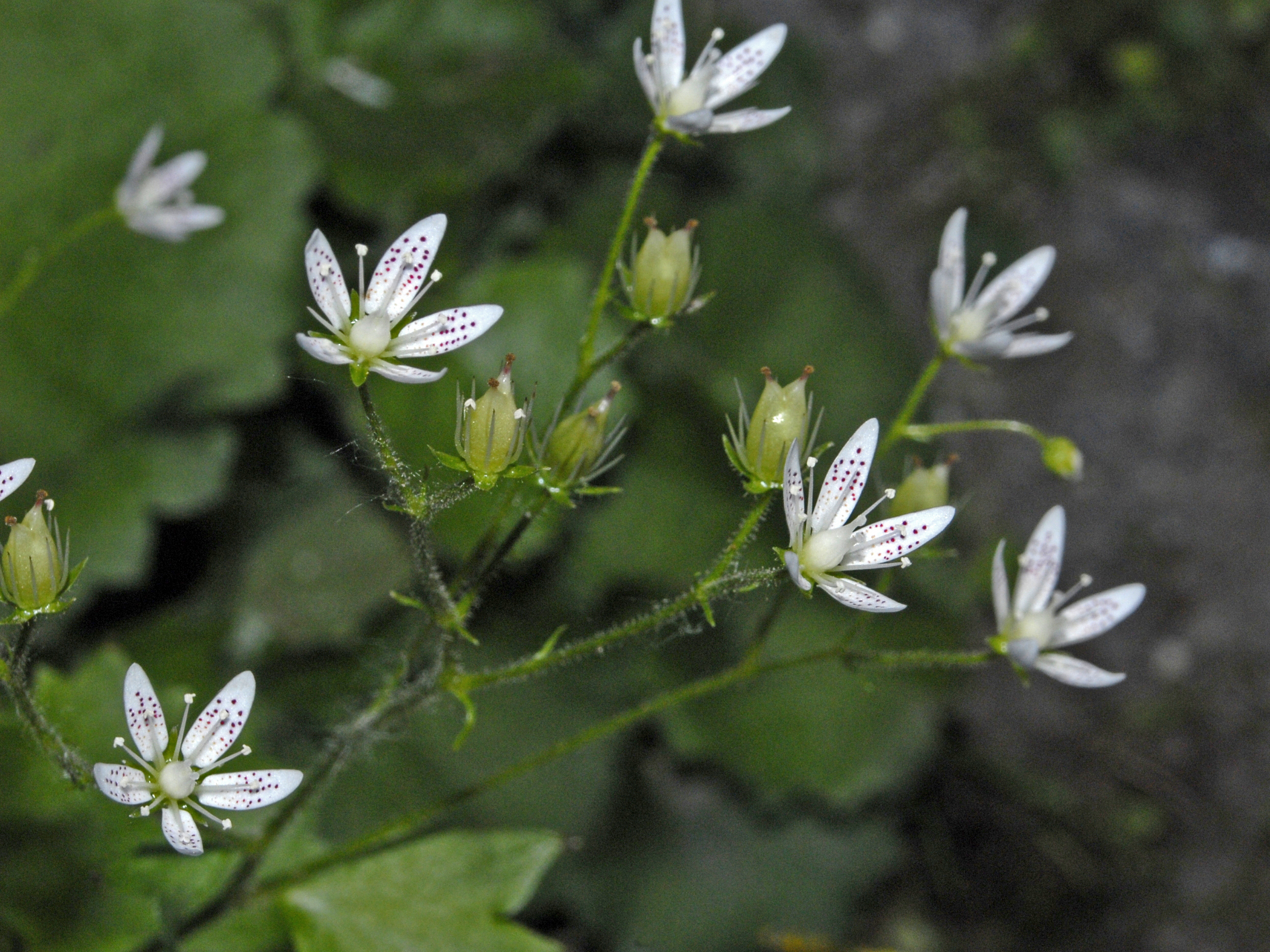
- Flowers of Saxifraga rotundifolia at the Giardino Botanico Alpino Chanousia

Scientific classification
- Kingdom: Plantae
- Clade: Tracheophytes
- Clade: Angiosperms
- Clade: Eudicots
- Order: Saxifragales
- Family: Saxifragaceae
- Genus: Saxifraga
- Species: S. rotundifolia

Binomial name
- Saxifraga rotundifolia L.

= Saxifraga rotundifolia =

Species of flowering plant

Saxifraga rotundifolia, common name round-leaved saxifrage, is a flowering herb and alpine plant of the genus Saxifraga.

== Subspecies ==
- Saxifraga rotundifolia subsp. heucherifolia (Grisebach & Schrenk.) Ciocarlan
- Saxifraga rotundifolia subsp. rotundifolia

== Description ==
Saxifraga rotundifolia can reach a height of 20–50 centimetres (7.9–19.7 in). This perennial herbaceous plant has fleshy leaves arranged in dense basal rosette. They are petiolate (up to 10 cm), up to 5 cm across, dark green, hairy, simple, rounded or almost heart-shaped, bordered by numerous triangular notches. The flowering stems are erect, pubescent, branched at the top, bearing narrow panicles of star-shaped flowers. These flowers have five lanceolate petals, usually white with numerous minute pink-purple specks. They bloom from April to August.

== Distribution ==
This species is present in the central and southern Europe in the Iberian Peninsula, the Alps and the Balkans.

== Habitat ==
Saxifraga rotundifolia prefers shady forests, damps, cliffs, stony soils and margins of streams at elevation of 700–2,200 metres (2,300–7,200 ft) above sea level.
