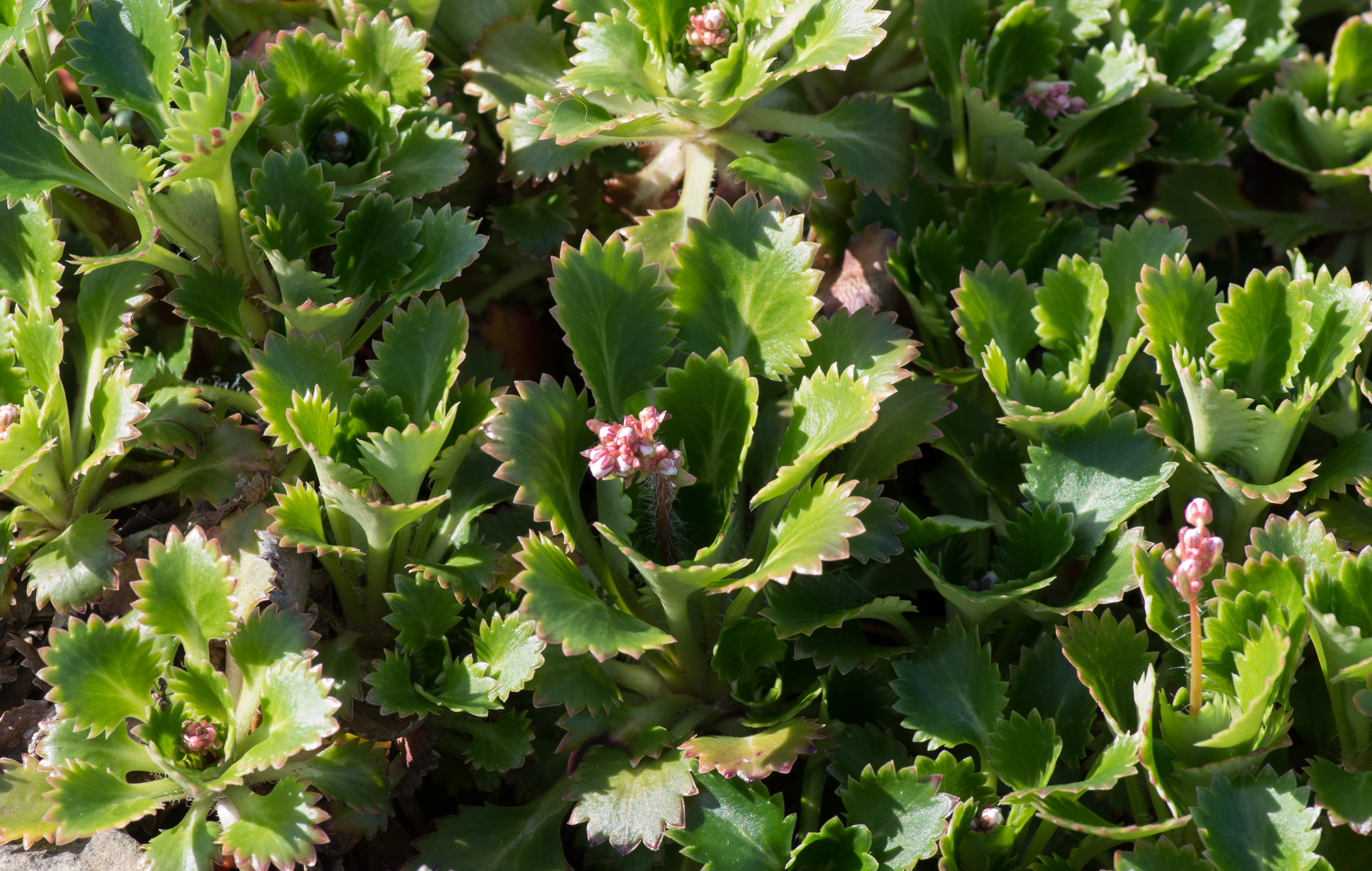

Scientific classification
- Kingdom: Plantae
- Clade: Tracheophytes
- Clade: Angiosperms
- Clade: Eudicots
- Order: Saxifragales
- Family: Saxifragaceae
- Genus: Saxifraga
- Species: S. spathularis

Binomial name
- Saxifraga spathularis Brot.

= Saxifraga spathularis =

Species of saxifrage

Saxifraga spathularis, the St Patrick's cabbage, is a species of saxifrage native to Ireland, Portugal, and Spain. It is a member of the so-called Lusitanian flora, a small set of plants which are native to Ireland but inexplicably absent from Great Britain. It consists of a basal rosette of elongate obovate succulent leaves around an upright leafless flowering stem. It seems to grow best in humus-rich alpine habitats among acidic rocks. With Saxifraga umbrosa it is a parent of Saxifraga × urbium (London pride).
