= Saxifraga duthiei =

Scientific classification
- Kingdom: Plantae
- Clade: Tracheophytes
- Clade: Angiosperms
- Clade: Eudicots
- Order: Saxifragales
- Family: Saxifragaceae
- Genus: Saxifraga
- Species: S. duthiei

Binomial name
- Saxifraga duthiei Gand.

Plant species

Saxifraga duthiei is a plant species that was first published in 1899 in the Bulletin of the French Botanical Society. It is also considered a synonym for Saxifraga oppositifolia subsp. oppositifolia. This plant is believed to be native to Baltistan and can be found growing at an altitude of approximately 3300 inches.

The leaves of Saxifraga duthiei are densely packed and grow in an opposite pattern. They are smooth, ovate in shape, and have an obtuse tip. The leaves are also keeled on the underside and have small pits on the upper surface. The flowers of this plant are pale pink and grow individually. The sepals are ovate and blunt, with sparse glandular hairs. The petals are narrow and obovate, about twice as long as the sepals. The filaments of the stamens are equal in length to the petals.

== Conservation status ==
Saxifraga duthiei is now extinct.
