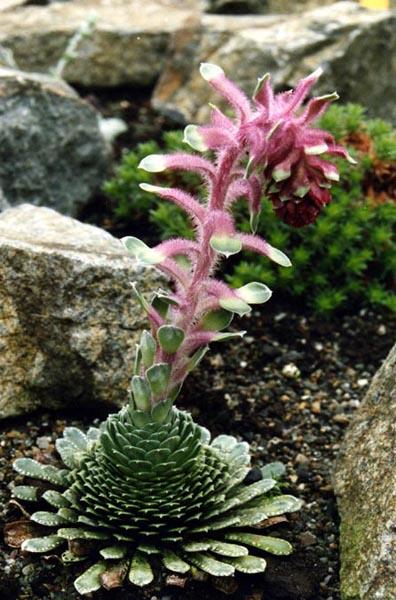
- Saxifraga federici-augusti subsp. grisebachii
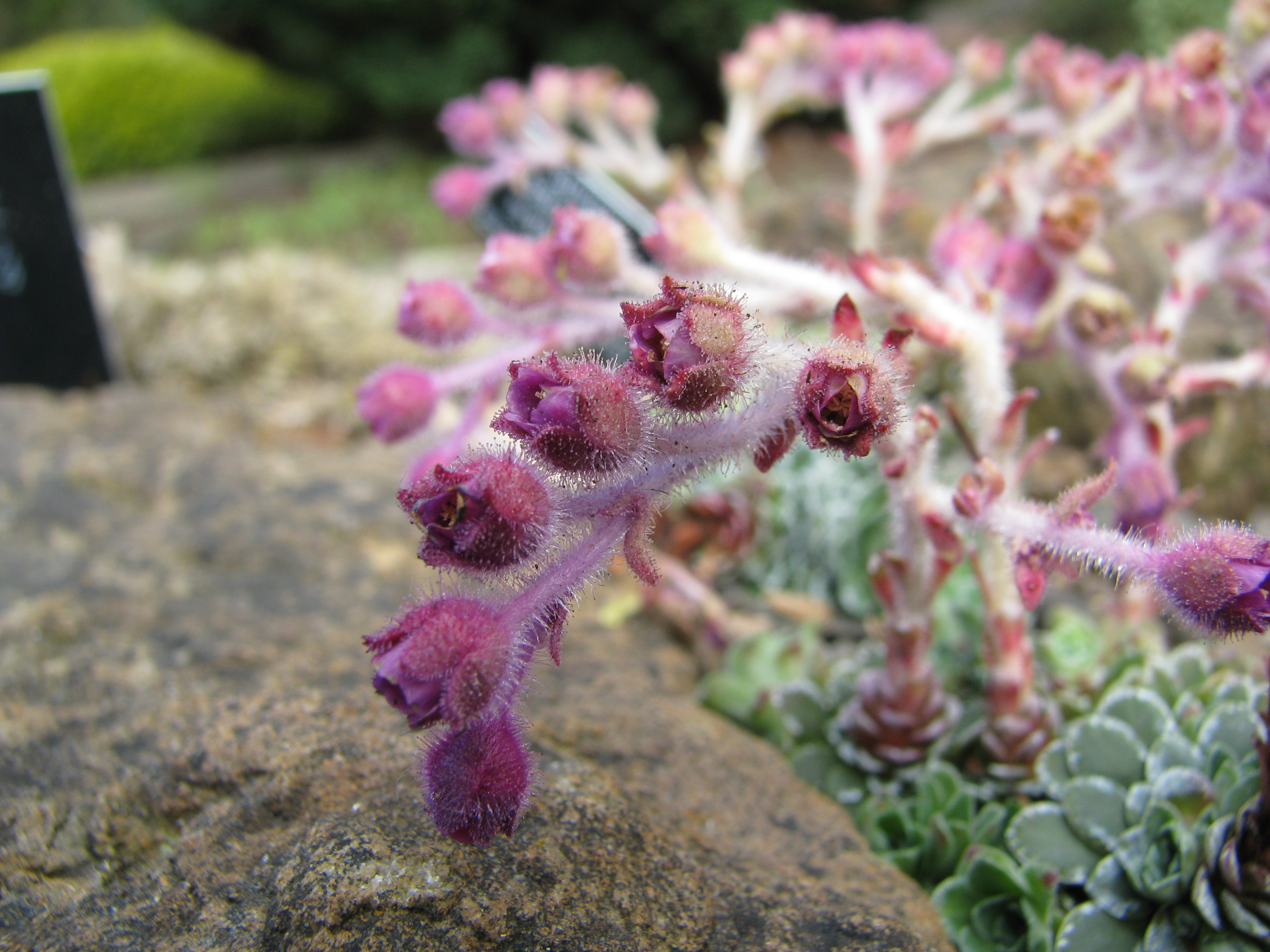
- Close up of flowers

Scientific classification
- Kingdom: Plantae
- Clade: Embryophytes
- Clade: Tracheophytes
- Clade: Angiosperms
- Clade: Eudicots
- Order: Saxifragales
- Family: Saxifragaceae
- Genus: Saxifraga
- Species: S. federici-augusti

Binomial name
- Saxifraga federici-augusti Biasol.

Synonyms
- Saxifraga grisebachii Degen & Dörfl.

= Saxifraga federici-augusti =

Species of flowering plant

Saxifraga federici-augusti (syn. Saxifraga grisebachii), common name Engleria saxifrage, is a herbaceous perennial plant belonging to the Saxifragaceae family. Its subspecies Saxifraga federici‑augusti subsp. grisebachii and the 'Wisley' cultivar of that subspecies have both gained the Royal Horticultural Society's Award of Garden Merit.

== Description ==
Saxifraga federici-augusti reaches on average 15 centimetres (5.9 in) in height. The flowers are red-purple. The flowering period extends from January through March.

== Distribution ==
This plant is native to Greece, Albania, and the former Yugoslavia.

== Subspecies ==
The following subspecies are accepted:

- Saxifraga federici-augusti subsp. federici-augusti
- Saxifraga federici-augusti subsp. grisebachii (Degen & Dörfl.) D.A.Webb
