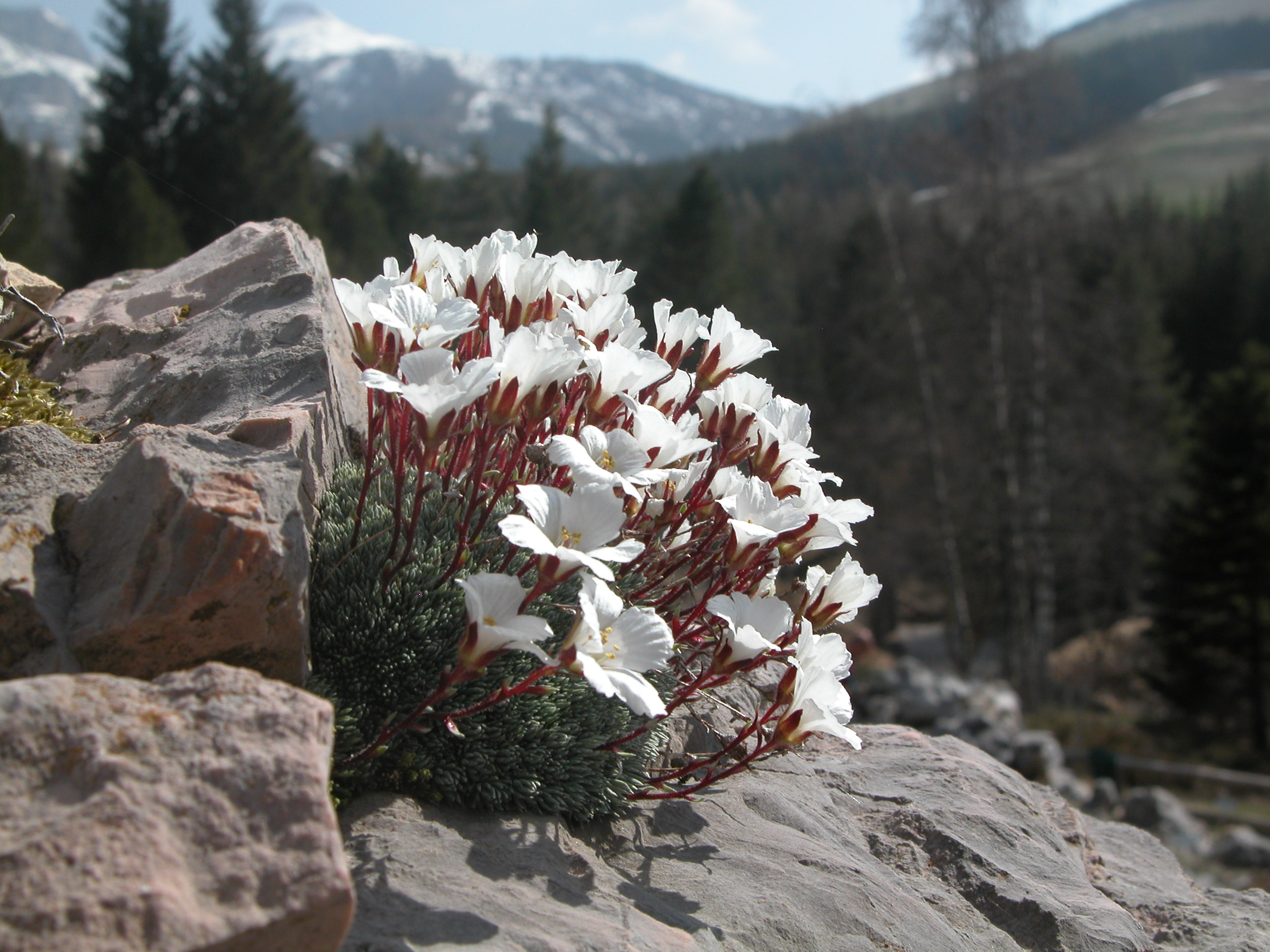
- In the wild in Italy
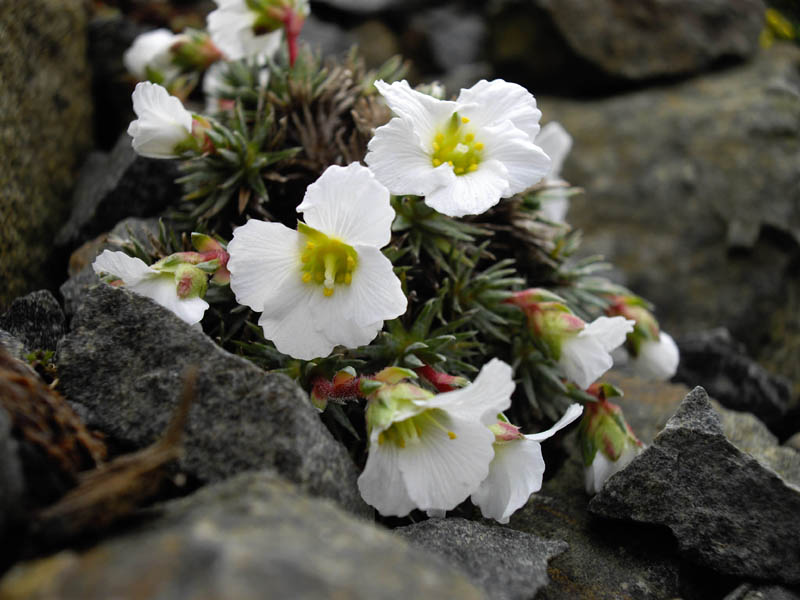
- Saxifraga burseriana 'Crenata'

Scientific classification
- Kingdom: Plantae
- Clade: Tracheophytes
- Clade: Angiosperms
- Clade: Eudicots
- Order: Saxifragales
- Family: Saxifragaceae
- Genus: Saxifraga
- Species: S. burseriana

Binomial name
- Saxifraga burseriana L.

Synonyms
- Chondrosea burseriana (L.) Haw.; Evaiezoa burseriana (L.) Raf.

= Saxifraga burseriana =

Species of flowering plant

Saxifraga burseriana, called the early white-flowered saxifrage, is a species of flowering plant in the genus Saxifraga, native to the eastern Alps; Germany, Austria, Liechtenstein, Italy, and Slovenia. Its cultivar 'Crenata' has gained the Royal Horticultural Society's Award of Garden Merit.
