= Saxifraga nathorstii =

Scientific classification
- Kingdom: Plantae
- Clade: Tracheophytes
- Clade: Angiosperms
- Clade: Eudicots
- Order: Saxifragales
- Family: Saxifragaceae
- Genus: Saxifraga
- Species: S. nathorstii

Binomial name
- Saxifraga nathorstii (Dusén) Hayek

Synonyms
- Boecherarctica narthorstii (Dusén) Á.Löve; Saxifraga oppositifolia narthorstii (Dusén) Farrer; Saxifraga oppositifolia var. narthorstii Dusén

Species of flowering plant

Saxifraga nathorstii, or Nathorst's saxifrage, is a species of flowering plant belonging to the family Saxifragaceae. Saxifraga nathorstii is a putative allotetraploid hydrid between S. aizoides and S. oppositifolia, and morphologically intermediate, even in terms of pollen, between the parent species.

It is native and endemic to Greenland, with a limited distribution in Northeast Greenland.

== Description ==
It is a somewhat densely tufted perennial with 3 – 6 cm high ascending stems. The singular sordid pink to fleshy coloured flowers are 8 – 15 mm wide, have 5 petals, which do not overlap, and 5 sepals 2 – 3 mm long.

Stems with alternate to opposite 4 – 9 mm long lance-shaped leaves with a pointed oval apex.

== Distribution and habitat ==
Commonly found on moist sandy to gravelly soils, e.g. in riverbeds sand and gravel or desiccated ponds.

Distribution ranges from Danmarks Island (70°30'N) to Jonsbu, Hochstetter Foreland (75°20'N).

== Conservation status ==
Despite is its limited distribution range and endemic status it is not a threatened species. The Greenland red list 2018 assesses the species to be of Least concern, but a species of national responsibility due to it endemic status. S. nathorstii have not been assessed on the IUCN red list.
