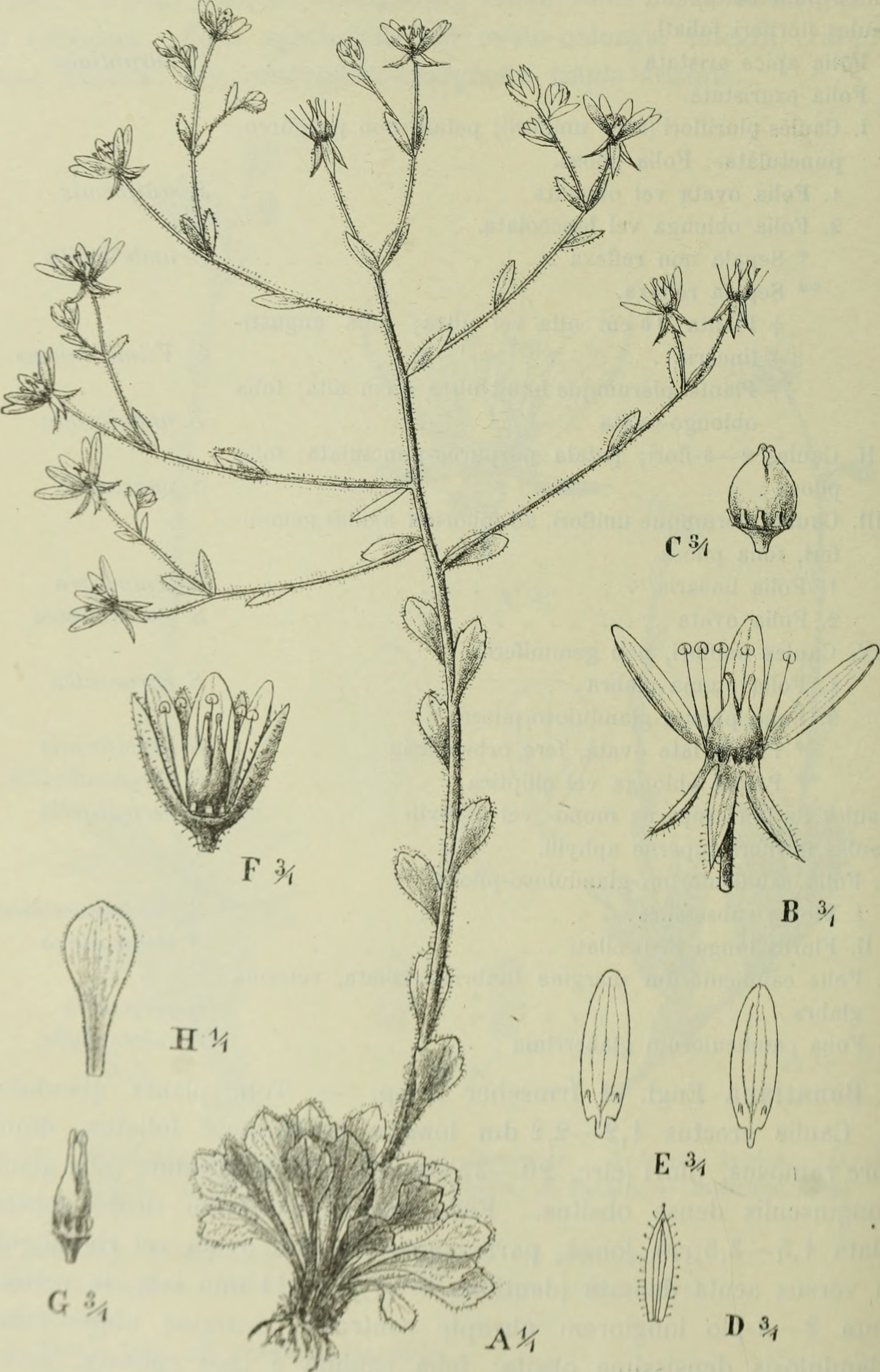
- Botanical illustration

Scientific classification
- Kingdom: Plantae
- Clade: Embryophytes
- Clade: Tracheophytes
- Clade: Angiosperms
- Clade: Eudicots
- Order: Saxifragales
- Family: Saxifragaceae
- Genus: Saxifraga
- Species: S. candelabrum

Binomial name
- Saxifraga candelabrum Franch.

Synonyms
- Hirculus bonatianus Losinsk.; Hirculus candelabrum Losinsk.; Saxifraga bonatiana Engl. & Irmsch.; Saxifraga candelabrum var. patentiramea Engl. & Irmsch.

= Saxifraga candelabrum =

Species of plant

Saxifraga candelabrum is a species of flowering plant in the family Saxifragaceae. It is native to northwestern Sichuan and northern Yunnan, China. A perennial herb reaching 15 to 38 cm (6 to 15 in), it is found in a variety of habitats, including forests, forest edges, high meadows, and rocky crevices at elevations from 2,000 to 4,200 m (6,600 to 13,800 ft). A 2026 study found that it is carnivorous, trapping insects in the glandular hairs of its leaves and digesting them.
