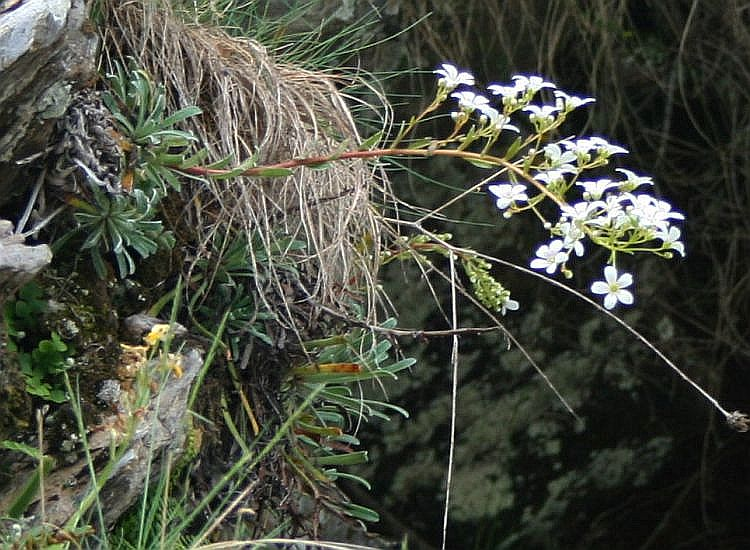
- S. callosa subsp. callosa

Scientific classification
- Kingdom: Plantae
- Clade: Tracheophytes
- Clade: Angiosperms
- Clade: Eudicots
- Order: Saxifragales
- Family: Saxifragaceae
- Genus: Saxifraga
- Species: S. callosa

Binomial name
- Saxifraga callosa Sm.

Synonyms
- Evaiezoa callosa; Saxifraga australis; Saxifraga lantoscana; Saxifraga lingulata; Saxifraga thyrsoides

= Saxifraga callosa =

Species of flowering plant

Saxifraga callosa, the limestone saxifrage, is a species of flowering plant in the family Saxifragaceae, that is native to maritime alpine habitats in Western Europe (Italy, France and Spain). Growing to 50 cm (20 in) tall by 100 cm (39 in) broad, it is a clump-forming evergreen perennial with rosettes of narrow grey-green leaves that are coated in lime. The starry, pure white flowers are borne in long panicles in spring.

The Latin specific epithet callosa means "thick-skinned, with calluses".

== Lower taxa ==
Saxifraga callosa is a variable species depending on location, Two subspecies and at least two varieties are recognised:-

- Saxifraga callosa subsp. callosa
  - var. australis
  - var. callosa
- Saxifraga callosa subsp. catalaunica

== Cultivation ==
Saxifraga callosa is cultivated as an ornamental garden plant. As it requires well-drained alkaline soil in full sun, it is often grown in an alpine house, where specialist conditions can be provided. It has gained the Royal Horticultural Society's Award of Garden Merit.
