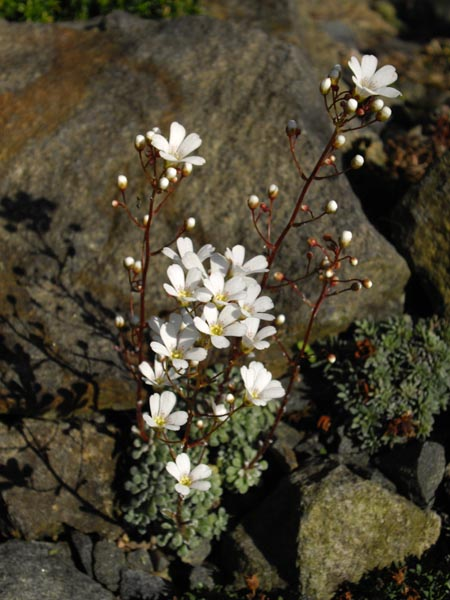
- Saxifraga cochlearis 'Probynii'
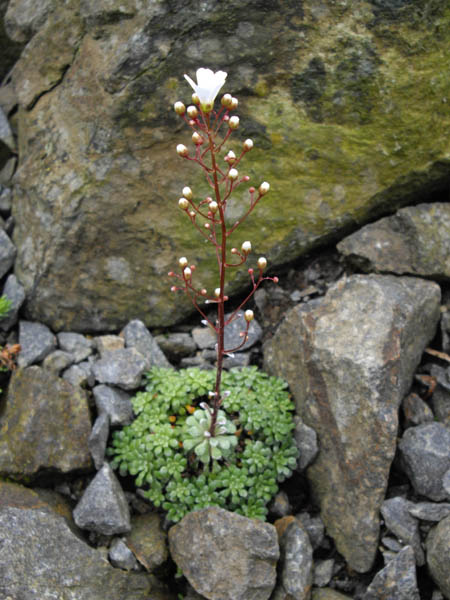
- Saxifraga cochlearis 'Minor'

Scientific classification
- Kingdom: Plantae
- Clade: Tracheophytes
- Clade: Angiosperms
- Clade: Eudicots
- Order: Saxifragales
- Family: Saxifragaceae
- Genus: Saxifraga
- Species: S. cochlearis

Binomial name
- Saxifraga cochlearis Rchb.

Synonyms
- Saxifraga probynii Correvon

= Saxifraga cochlearis =

Species of flowering plant

Saxifraga cochlearis, called the spoon-leaved saxifrage, is a species of flowering plant in the genus Saxifraga, native to the Alpes Maritimes of France and the adjoining Italian region of Liguria. Its 'Minor' subtaxon has gained the Royal Horticultural Society's Award of Garden Merit.
