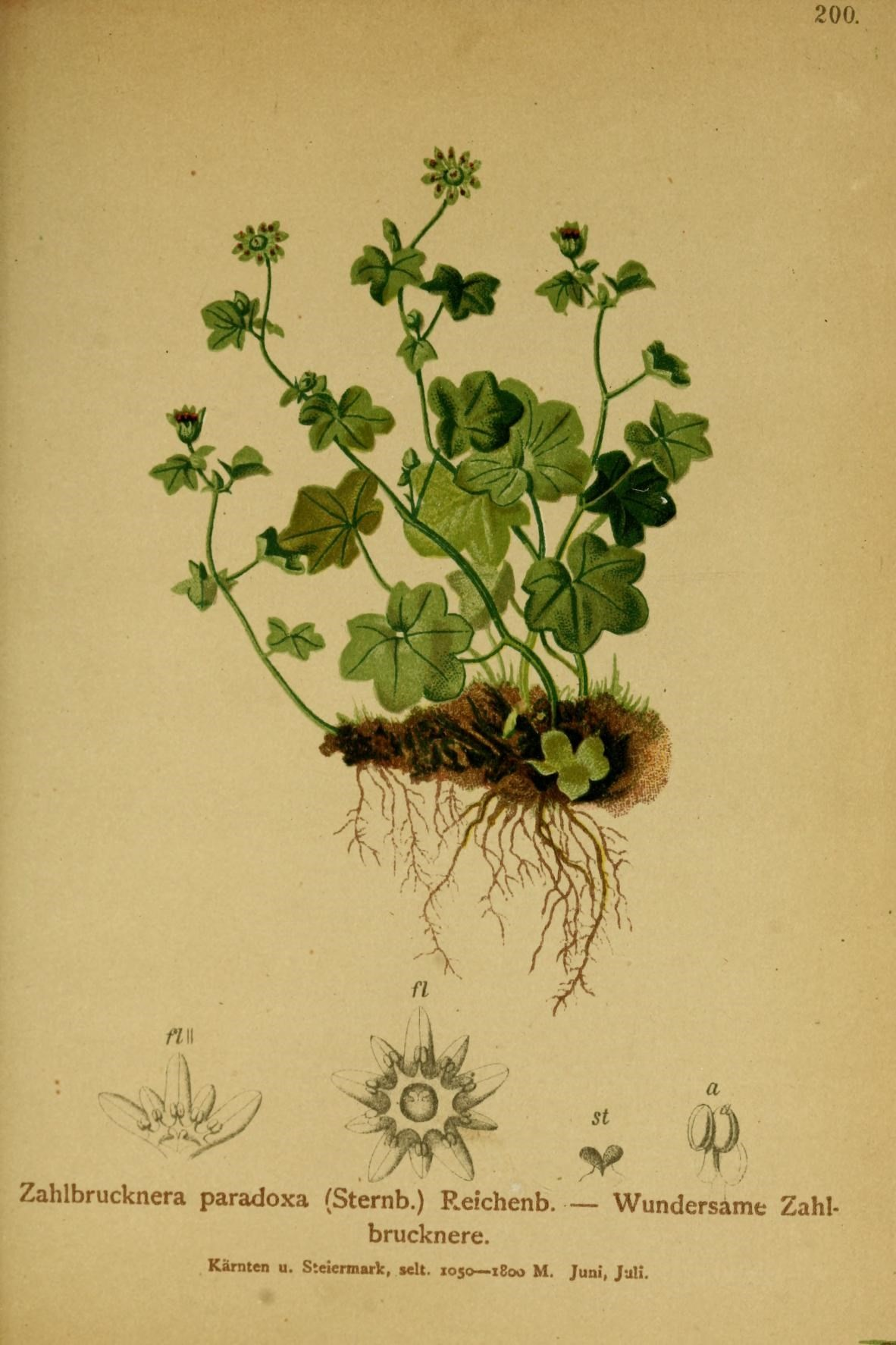

Scientific classification
- Kingdom: Plantae
- Clade: Tracheophytes
- Clade: Angiosperms
- Clade: Eudicots
- Order: Saxifragales
- Family: Saxifragaceae
- Genus: Saxifraga
- Species: S. paradoxa

Binomial name
- Saxifraga paradoxa Sternb.

Synonyms
- Cymbalariella paradoxa Nappi; Lobaria paradoxa Haw.; Zahlbrucknera paradoxa Rchb.

= Saxifraga paradoxa =

Species of plant

Saxifraga paradoxa, commonly known as the fragile saxifrage, is a perennial plant species in the family Saxifragaceae, which occurs as a tertiary relict and endemic Saxifraga species in the South-Eastern Alps. Count Kaspar Maria von Sternberg described this species in his work Revisio Saxifragarum iconibus of 1810.

== Description ==
This perennial species is a deciduous to semi-deciduous low-growing plant that can reach up to 20 cm (8 in) in height and can spread around for approximately 30 cm (12 in) with its ascending to decumbent stems. Its shining and small leaves are mid- to bright green, in shape usually reniform (kidney-like) and slightly lobed. Saxifraga paradoxa characteristic are also small pale green coloured flowers that have linearly-shaped petals, red anthers and are arranged into an axillary cyme. The plant's flowering period is between May and August.

== Distribution and conservation ==
This Saxifraga species native range are South-Eastern Alps, with most of its populations inhabiting Slovenia and Austria. In Austria Saxifraga paradoxa occurs in Carinthia and Styria, while in Slovenia its growing area includes valleys of rivers Hudinja and Lobnica (tributary of Drava) near Pohorje, as well as Kozjak mountains and Košenjak. Its habitat usually consists of damp and shaded rocky screes with non-calcareous basis, mostly containing granite and gneiss. After this species Slovak botanist Ladislav Mucina named plant community Saxifragetum paradoxae, with Saxifraga paradoxa being its characteristic species.

Saxifraga paradoxa has not yet been evaluated for the IUCN Red List.

== Taxonomy ==
So-called European purple saxifrages (members of Saxifraga's section Porphyrion and subsection Oppositifoliae) are a big group of numerous taxa with uncertain taxonomic position, widely distributed in mountain ranges of central and southern Europe. Researchers studied their evolutionary relationship with a use of amplified fragment length polymorphism (AFLP) fingerprinting and Saxifraga paradoxa was shown not to be genetically divergent taxon. Recent research treats Saxifraga paradoxa as a member of Saxifraga's section Saxifraga and subsection Arachnoideae.
