= Saxifraga brachypoda =

Scientific classification
- Kingdom: Plantae
- Clade: Tracheophytes
- Clade: Angiosperms
- Clade: Eudicots
- Order: Saxifragales
- Family: Saxifragaceae
- Genus: Saxifraga
- Species: S. brachypoda

Binomial name
- Saxifraga brachypoda D.Don

Varieties
- Saxifraga brachypoda var. brachypoda; Saxifraga brachypoda var. eglandulosa (Harry Sm.) S.Akiyama, H.Ohba & S.K.Wu; Saxifraga brachypoda var. gouldii (C.E.C.Fisch.) S.Akiyama, H.Ohba & S.K.Wu

Synonyms
- synonyms of var. brachypoda: Brachycaulos simplicifolius Dikshit & Panigrahi; Hirculus brachypodus Losinsk.; Saxifraga glandulosa Wall.; synonyms of var. eglandulosa: Saxifraga gouldii var. eglandulosa Harry Sm.; synonyms of var. gouldii: Saxifraga gouldii C.E.C.Fisch.

Genus of flowering plants

Saxifraga brachypoda is a species of flowering plant in the saxifrage family, Saxifragaceae. It is a perennial or subshrub native to subalpine regions of the Himalayas, ranging from the Western Himalayas through Nepal, Tibet, and northeastern India to Myanmar and south-central China.

Three varieties are accepted:

- Saxifraga brachypoda var. brachypoda
- Saxifraga brachypoda var. eglandulosa (Harry Sm.) S.Akiyama, H.Ohba & S.K.Wu
- Saxifraga brachypoda var. gouldii (C.E.C.Fisch.) S.Akiyama, H.Ohba & S.K.Wu
