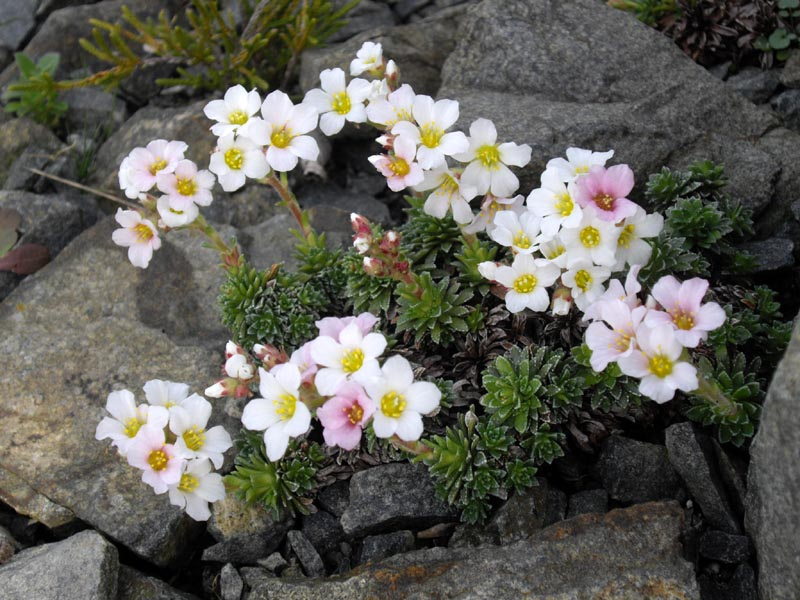
- Flowers and foliage
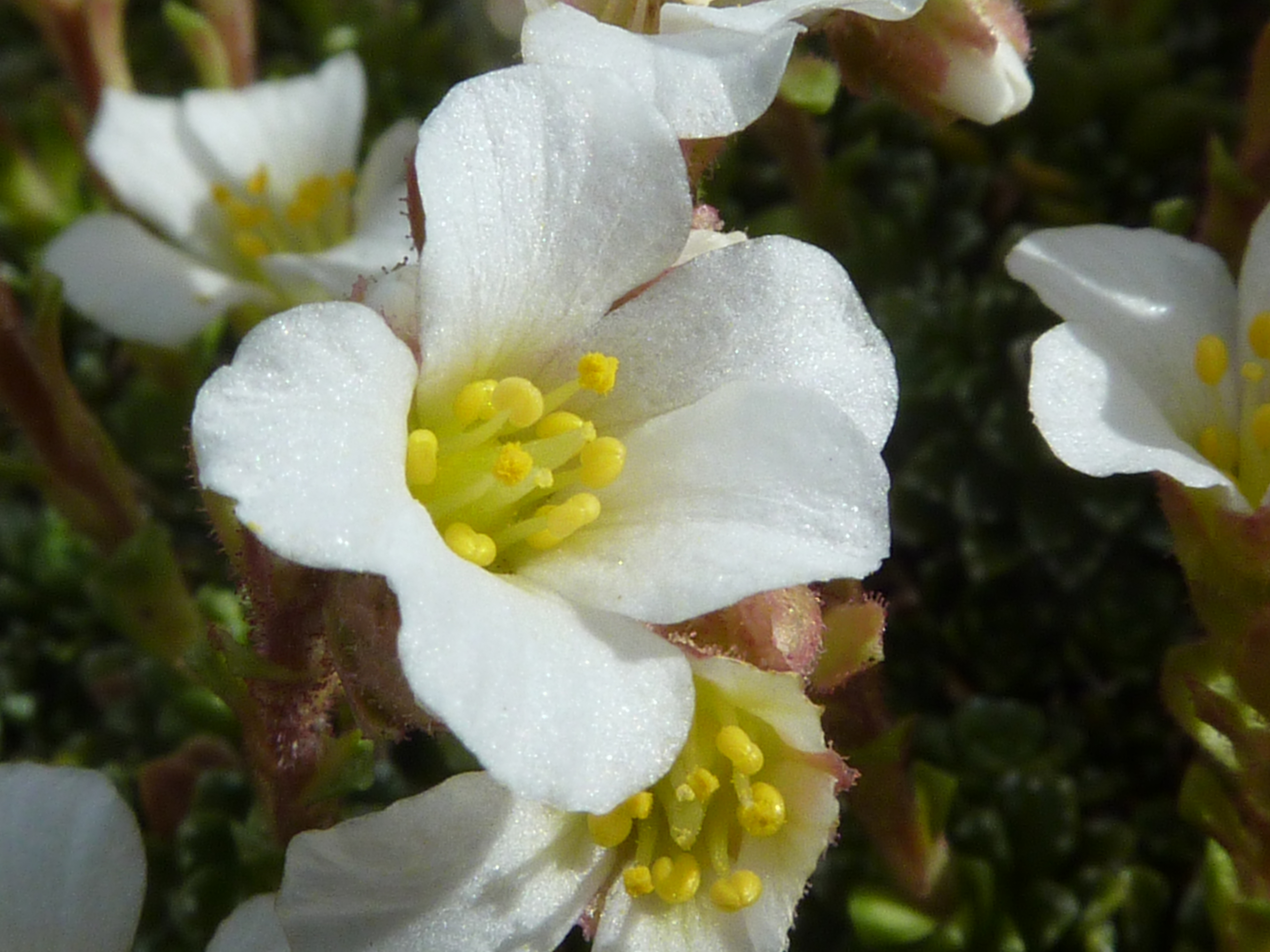
- Close-up of flower

Scientific classification
- Kingdom: Plantae
- Clade: Embryophytes
- Clade: Tracheophytes
- Clade: Spermatophytes
- Clade: Angiosperms
- Clade: Eudicots
- Order: Saxifragales
- Family: Saxifragaceae
- Genus: Saxifraga
- Species: S. marginata

Binomial name
- Saxifraga marginata Sternb.

Synonyms
- List: Saxifraga boryi Boiss. & Heldr.; Saxifraga carpathica N.Terracc.; Saxifraga coriophylla Griseb.; Saxifraga marginata var. bubakii (Rohlena) Horný & Webr; Saxifraga pseudocaesia Rochel; Saxifraga recta Ten.; Saxifraga rigens Kit.; Saxifraga rocheliana Sternb.

= Saxifraga marginata =

Species of flowering plant

Saxifraga marginata, the Kabschia saxifrage, is a species of flowering plant in the family Saxifragaceae, native to southeastern Europe. It and its cultivar 'Balkan' (formerly the rocheliana subtaxon) have both gained the Royal Horticultural Society's Award of Garden Merit as ornamentals.
