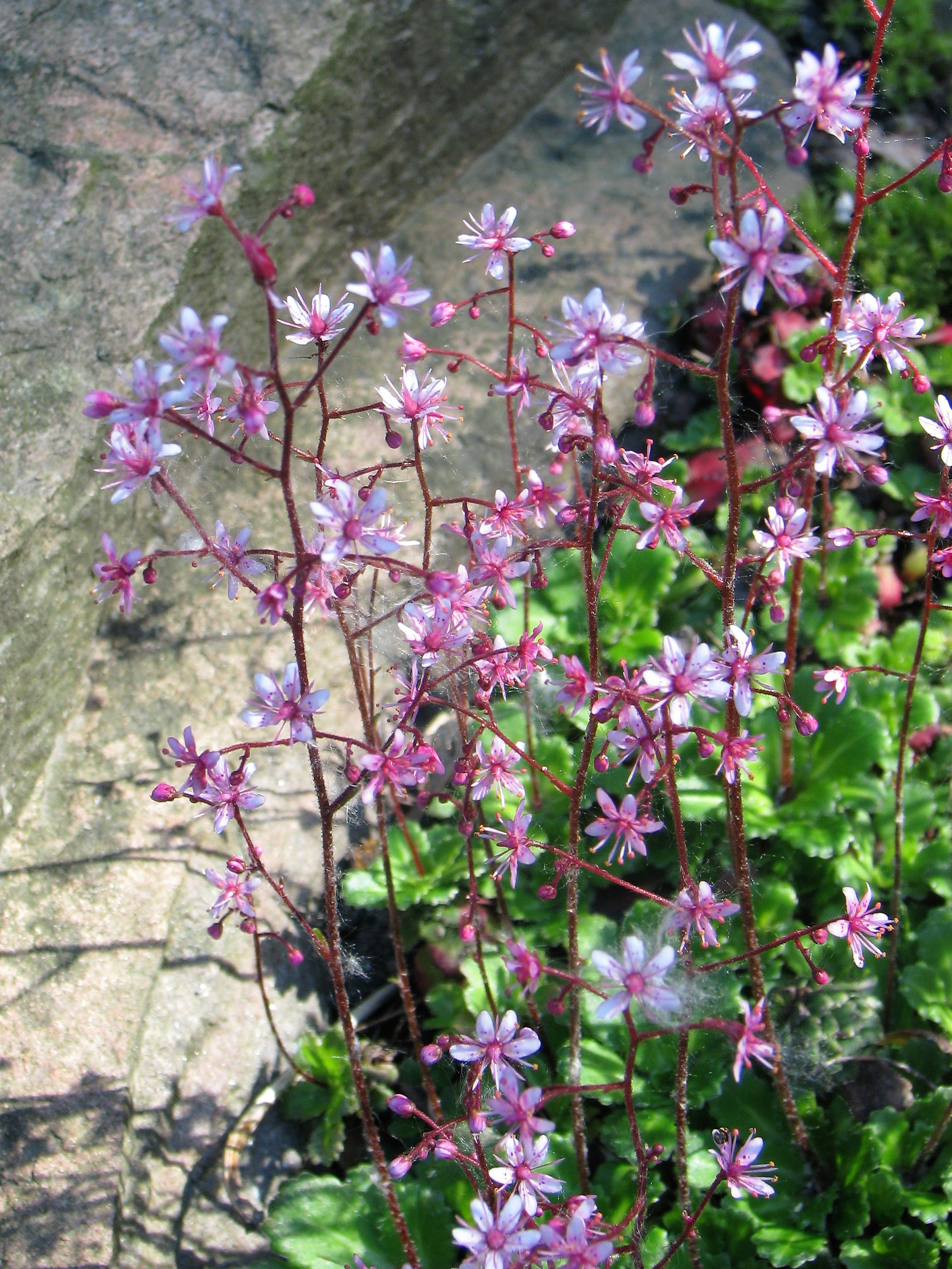
- At the botanical garden of the University of Wrocław
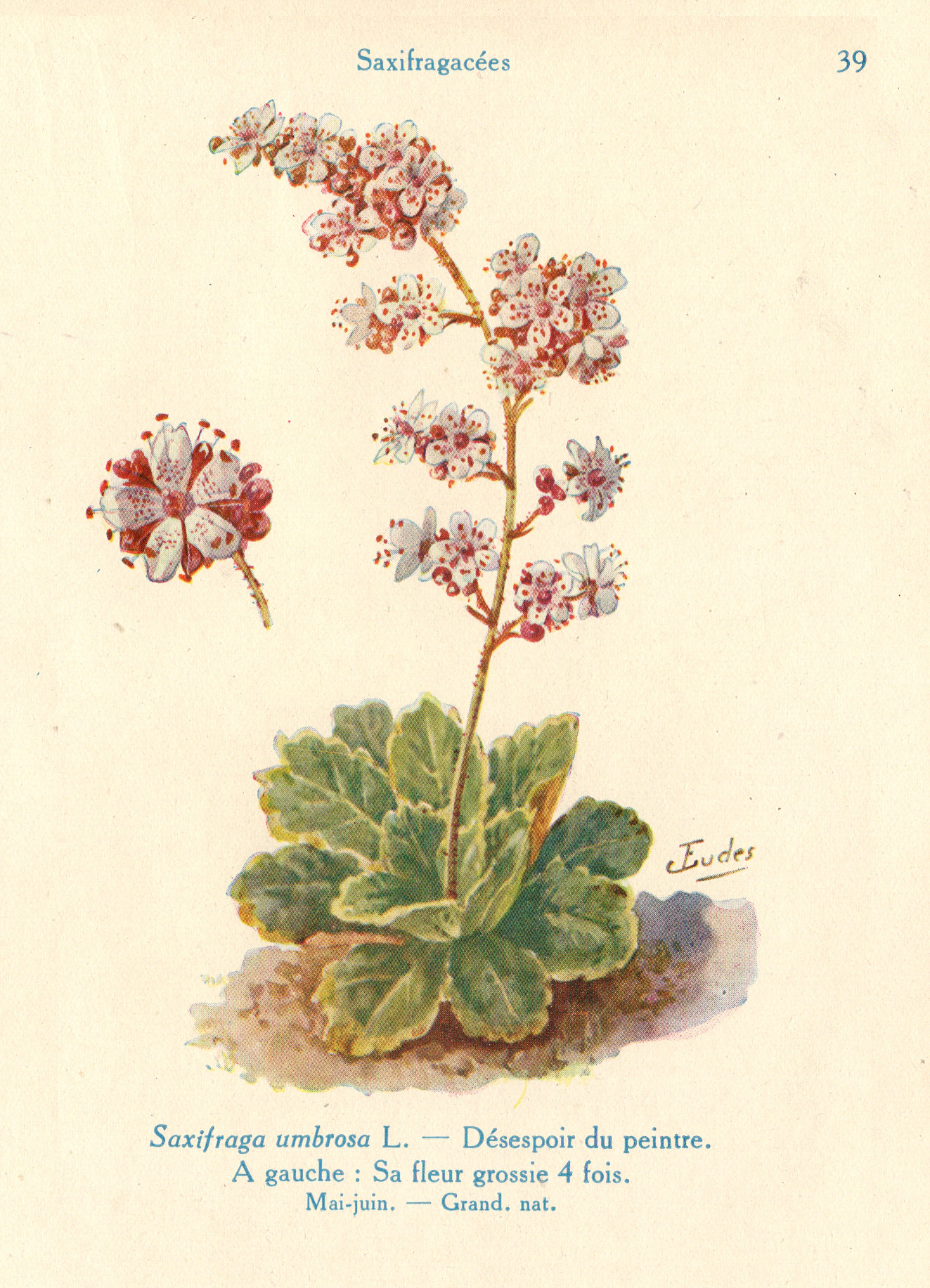
- Botanical illustration

Scientific classification
- Kingdom: Plantae
- Clade: Tracheophytes
- Clade: Angiosperms
- Clade: Eudicots
- Order: Saxifragales
- Family: Saxifragaceae
- Genus: Saxifraga
- Species: S. umbrosa

Binomial name
- Saxifraga umbrosa L.

Synonyms
- List: Geum umbrosum (L.) Moench; Hydatica umbrosa (L.) Raf.; Robertsonia hybrida (Vill. ex Lapeyr.) Link; Robertsonia sphaeroidea Haw.; Robertsonia umbrosa (L.) Haw.; Saxifraga dentata Link; Saxifraga haworthii Sweet; Saxifraga hybrida Vill. ex Lapeyr.; Saxifraga polita Ser.; Saxifraga sphaeroidea (Haw.) Sweet; Steiranisia punctata Raf.

= Saxifraga umbrosa =

Species of flowering plant

Saxifraga umbrosa, called true London pride, none-so-pretty, king's feather, kiss-me-quick, leaf of St Patrick, look-up-and-kiss-me, mignonette of the French, Nancy-pretty, prattling Parnell, Pyrenean saxifrage, sailor plant, St Anne's needlework, St Patrick's cabbage, and whimsey, although some of these names may more properly belong to Saxifraga spathularis, or its hybrid with S. spathularis, Saxifraga × urbium, is a species of flowering plant in the family Saxifragaceae. It is native to the Pyrenees, and has been introduced elsewhere in Europe, and to southern Chile. Its cultivar 'Clarence Elliott' has gained the Royal Horticultural Society's Award of Garden Merit.

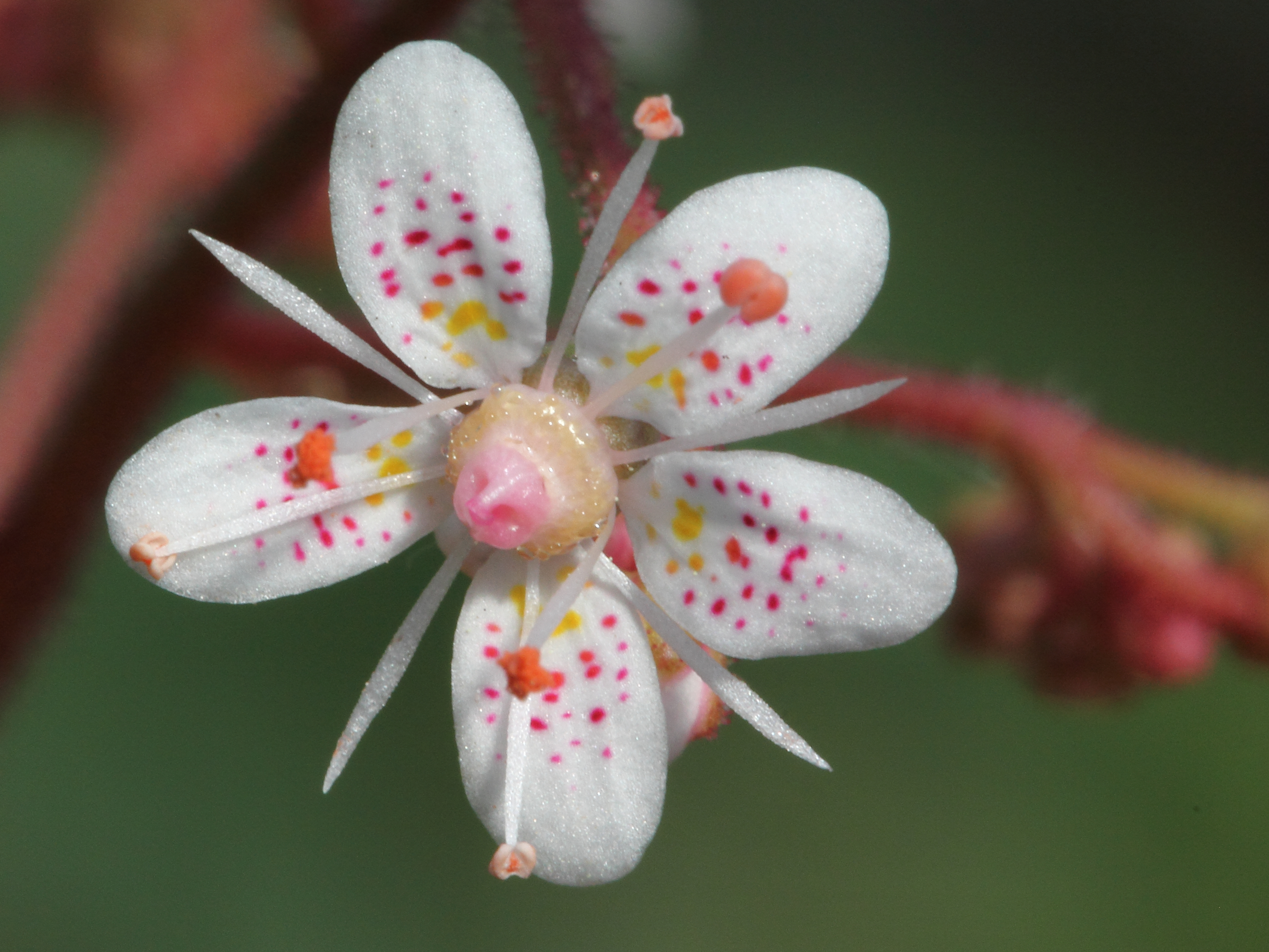
Close-up of flower

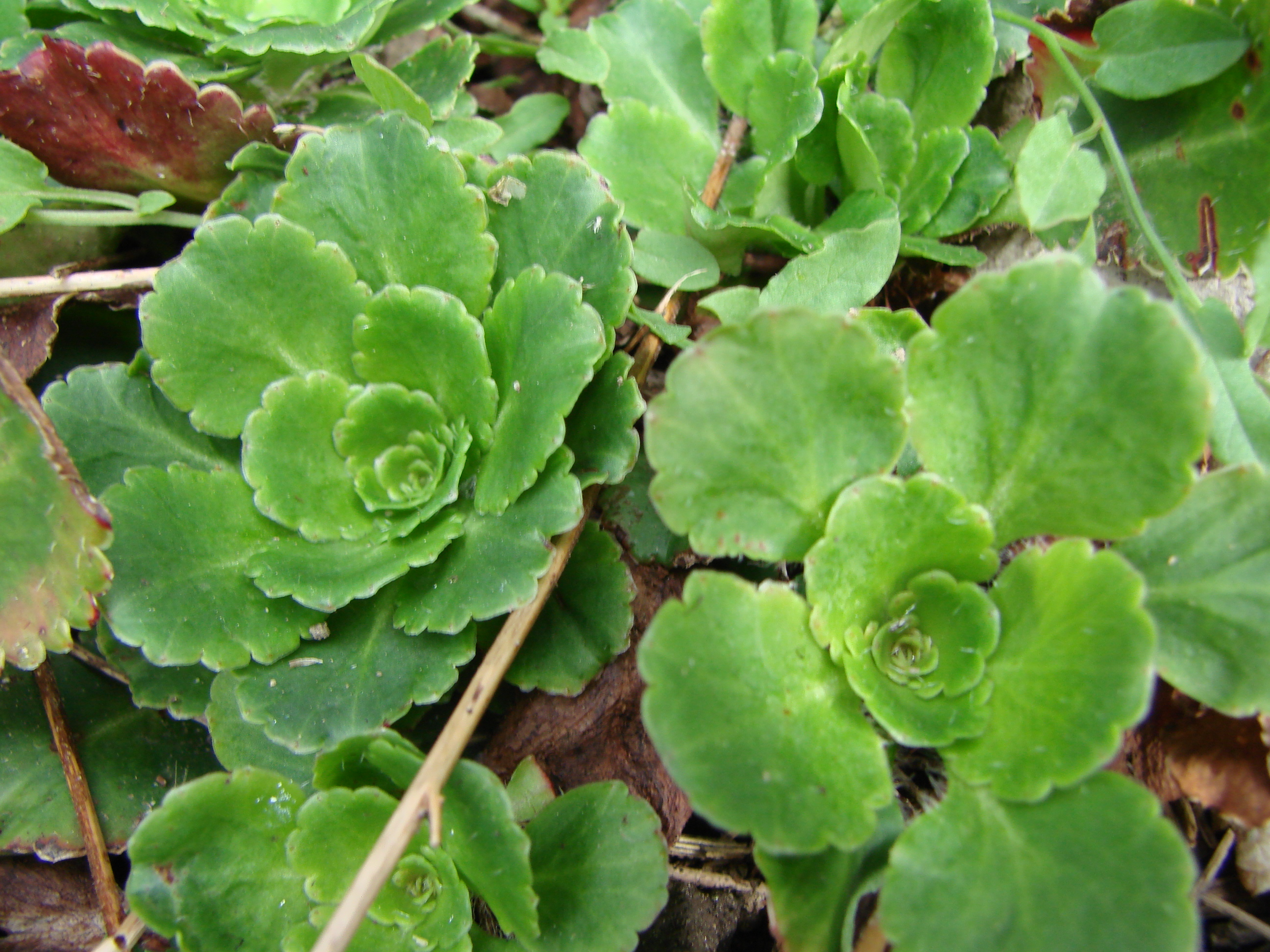
Foliage

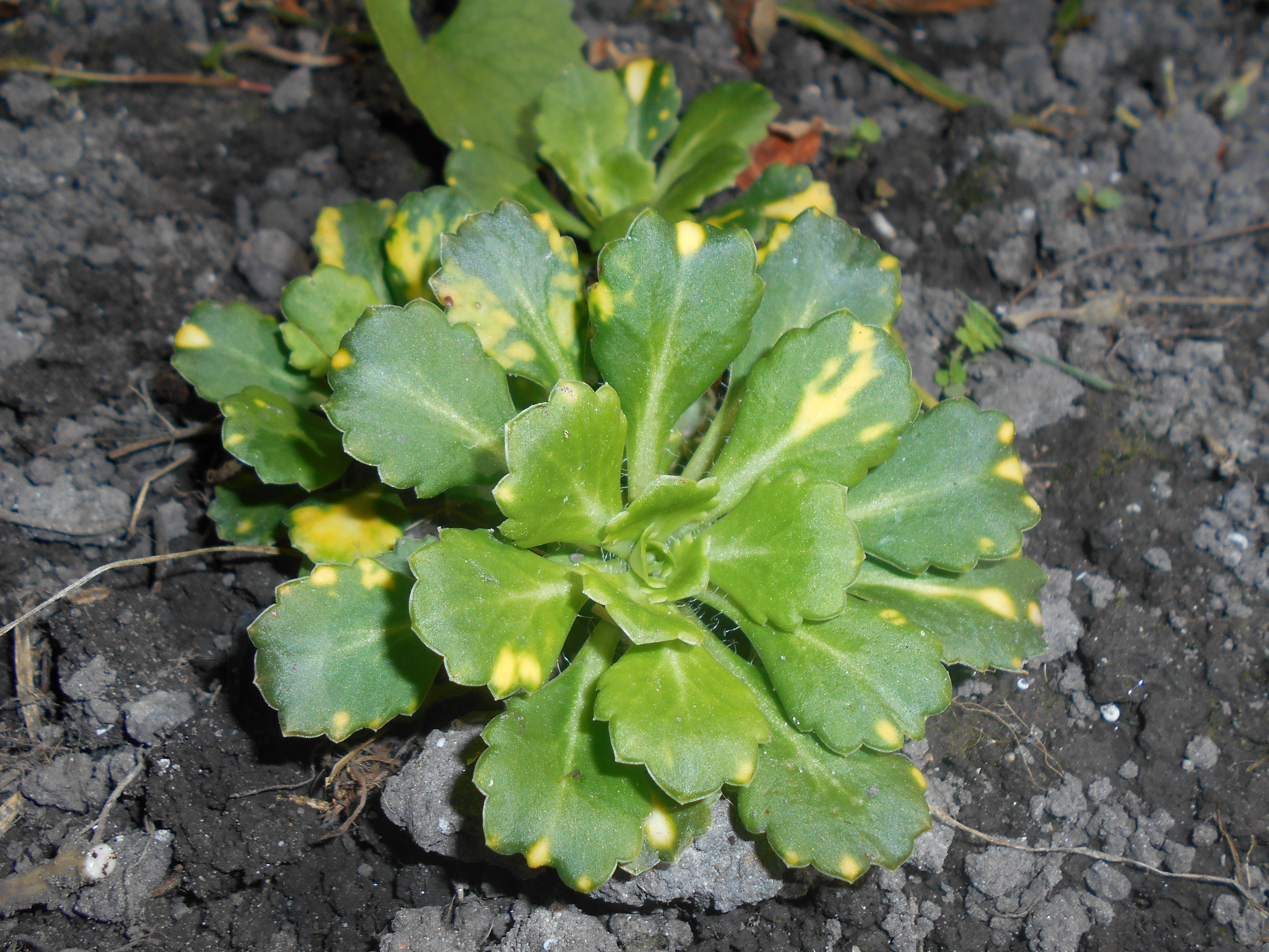
Variegated cultivar

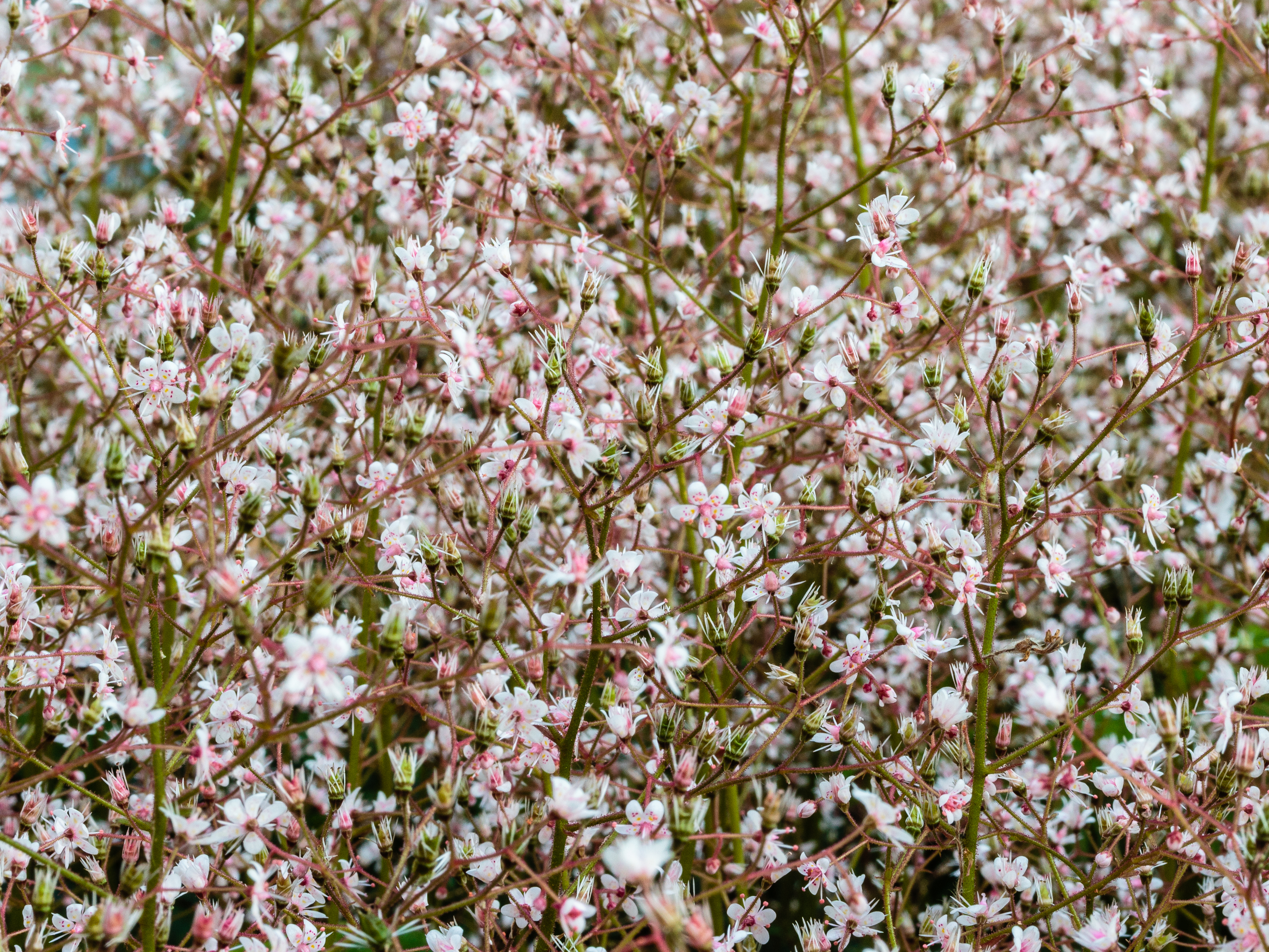
Mass effect
