= Saxifraga svalbardensis =

Scientific classification
- Kingdom: Plantae
- Clade: Embryophytes
- Clade: Tracheophytes
- Clade: Spermatophytes
- Clade: Angiosperms
- Clade: Eudicots
- Order: Saxifragales
- Family: Saxifragaceae
- Genus: Saxifraga
- Species: S. svalbardensis

Binomial name
- Saxifraga svalbardensis Øvstedal

Species of flowering plant

Saxifraga svalbardensis is a species of flowering plant in the family Saxifragaceae, endemic to Svalbard. It arose, probably after the end of the last ice age, as a hybrid between Saxifraga rivularis (the seed parent) and S. cernua (the pollen parent).
