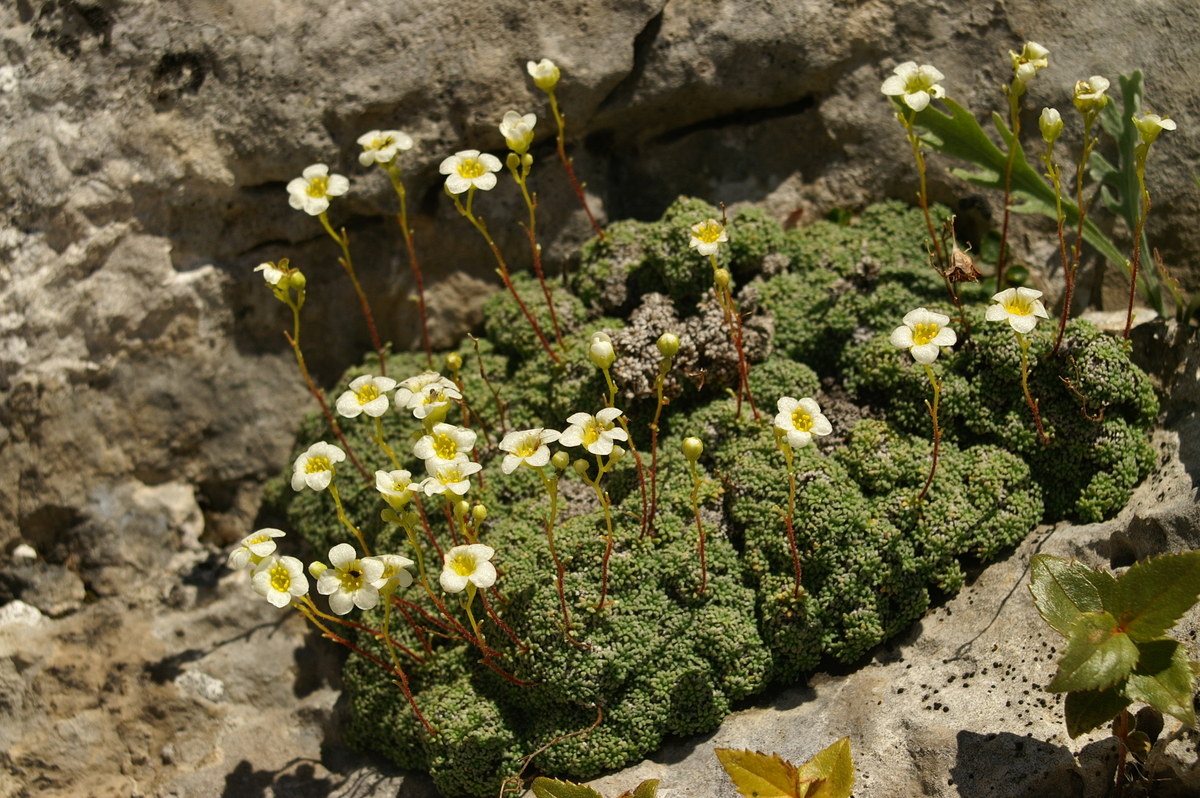

Scientific classification
- Kingdom: Plantae
- Clade: Tracheophytes
- Clade: Angiosperms
- Clade: Eudicots
- Order: Saxifragales
- Family: Saxifragaceae
- Genus: Saxifraga
- Species: S. squarrosa

Binomial name
- Saxifraga squarrosa (Sieber, 1821)

= Saxifraga squarrosa =

Species of flowering plant

Saxifraga squarrosa, the Dolomites saxifrage, is a species of flowering plant belonging to the family Saxifragaceae. It is native to the Eastern Alps.
