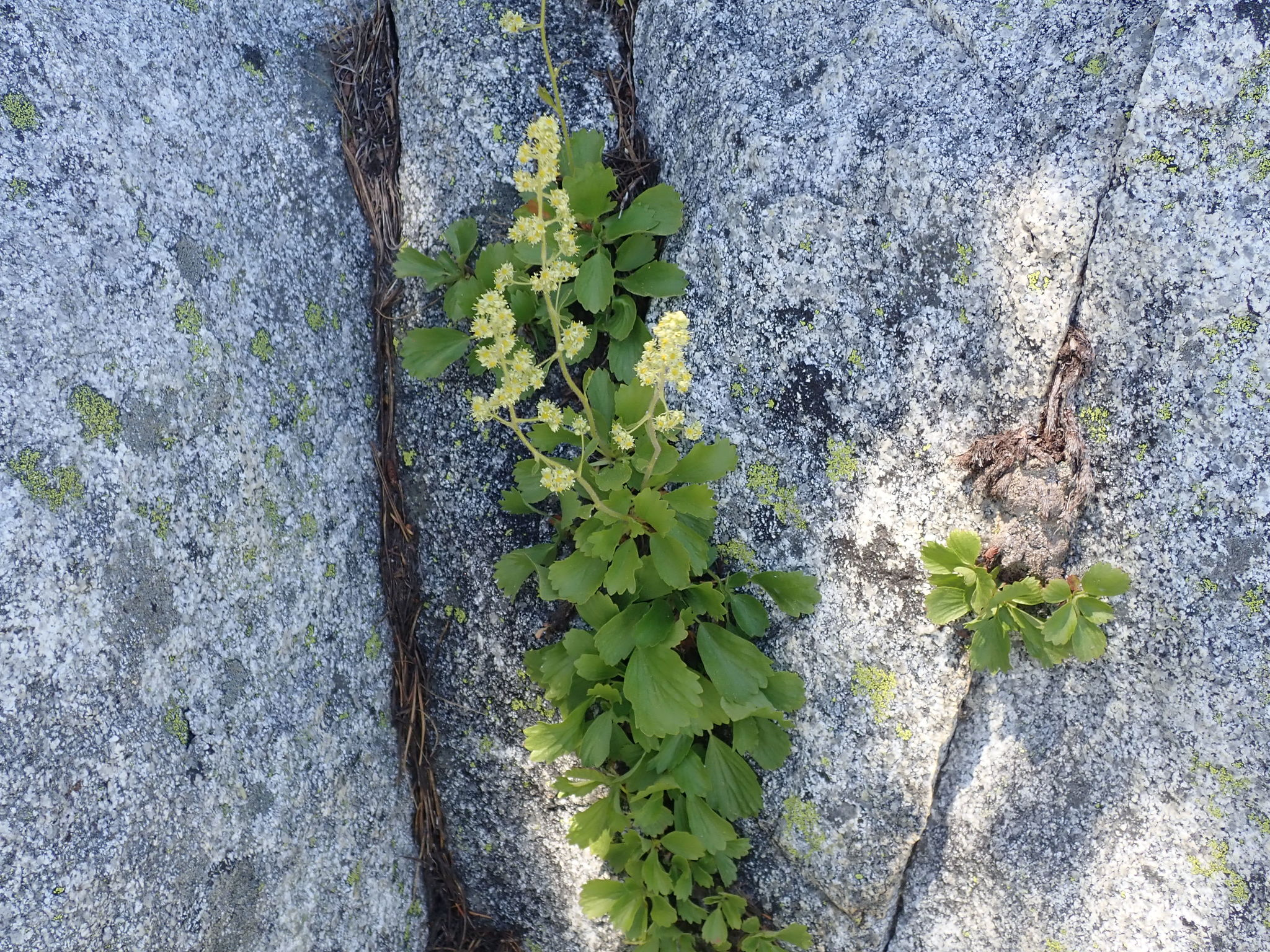

Conservation status
- Vulnerable (NatureServe)

Scientific classification
- Kingdom: Plantae
- Clade: Tracheophytes
- Clade: Angiosperms
- Clade: Eudicots
- Order: Saxifragales
- Family: Saxifragaceae
- Genus: Saxifragopsis; Small (1896)
- Species: S. fragarioides

Binomial name
- Saxifragopsis fragarioides (Greene) Small (1896)

Synonyms
- Saxifraga fragarioides Greene (1881)

= Saxifragopsis =

Genus of flowering plants

Saxifragopsis is a monotypic genus of flowering plants in the saxifrage family containing the single species Saxifragopsis fragarioides, which is known by the common name strawberry saxifrage. This plant is sometimes included in genus Saxifraga. It is native to the northwestern United States, where it is mostly limited to the Klamath Mountains of southern Oregon and northern California, with some disjunct occurrences known from Washington. It grows in rocky mountain habitat, such as talus. This is a mat-forming perennial herb growing from a thick, woody caudex and system of rhizomes. Leaves are mostly located at ground level, the toothed oval blade attached to the long petiole by a joint and easily broken off. Smaller, reduced leaves are located along the stem. The inflorescence arises on an erect, hairy, glandular peduncle and is made up of many small clusters of white-petaled flowers.
