= Kubitzkia =

Scientific classification
- Kingdom: Plantae
- Clade: Tracheophytes
- Clade: Angiosperms
- Clade: Magnoliids
- Order: Laurales
- Family: Lauraceae
- Genus: Kubitzkia van der Werff

Species
- Kubitzkia macrantha (Kosterm.) van der Werff; Kubitzkia mezii (Kosterm.) van der Werff

Genus of flowering plants

Kubitzia is a neotropical flowering plant genus in the family Lauraceae with two species native to the Guianas, Venezuela, and northern Brazil in northern South America.

== Description ==
They are evergreen trees up to 25 m high with spicy odor and hermaphrodites. The leaves are alternate, entire, elliptical or narrowly elliptical glossy in appearance, pointed oval in shape with an apical mucro, or 'drip tip', which permit the leaves to shed water despite the humidity, allowing perspiration and respiration from plant in wet laurel forest habitat. The fruit is a berry dispersed mostly by birds. They are present in low and mountain cloud forest in Caribbean islands, Central America, and northern to central South America. The genus was described by van der Werff published in Taxon 35 (1): 165 in 1986. The type species is Kubitzkia mezii (Kosterm.) Van der Werff.

== Ecology ==
The neotropical genus Kubitzia of the family Lauraceae currently includes 2 species, the differences are ecological adaptations to different environments over a relatively dry-wet climate. Species in less humid environment are smaller or less robust, with less abundant and thinner foliage and have oleifera cells that give trees a more fragrant aroma. They are poorly defined botanically. The most known trees are used by the timber industry. The wood has a high commercial value. The genera Kubitzia is closely related to genera Dicypellium, Phyllostemonodaphne, Systemonodaphne, and Urbanodendron.

Its distribution extends from the islands of the Antilles in the Caribbean throughout the Guianas and the Amazon region but also in the Pacific coastal areas of Colombia. They grow mostly in tropical forests and Andean cloud forest.

They do not form large stands but rather small groups of trees with a density of up to one individual per five hectares. Due to the low density, exploitation of the natural populations is to the detriment of the rainforest. Overexploitation is ease due to the distribution in inaccessible rainforest regions and its low density, it is very hard to survey population trends in figures, but overexploitation is evident. Proposals of exploitation must be made before overexploitation of nature poblations causes problems for commercial utilisation.

== Species ==
Two species are accepted:

- Kubitzkia macrantha (Kosterm.) van der Werff
- Kubitzkia mezii (Kosterm.) van der Werff
