= Urbanodendron verrucosum =

Conservation status
- Least Concern (IUCN 3.1)

Scientific classification
- Kingdom: Plantae
- Clade: Tracheophytes
- Clade: Angiosperms
- Clade: Magnoliids
- Order: Laurales
- Family: Lauraceae
- Genus: Urbanodendron
- Species: U. verrucosum

Binomial name
- Urbanodendron verrucosum (Nees) Mez

Synonyms
- Aydendron verrucosum Nees; Aydendron verrucosum var. attenuatum Meisn.; Aydendron verrucosum var. elongatum Meisn.; Licaria triplicalyx Pedralli

Species of flowering plant

Urbanodendron verrucosum is a species of flowering plant in the family Lauraceae. It is a tree endemic to southeastern Brazil.
