= Urbanodendron bahiense =

Conservation status
- Endangered (IUCN 3.1)

Scientific classification
- Kingdom: Plantae
- Clade: Tracheophytes
- Clade: Angiosperms
- Clade: Magnoliids
- Order: Laurales
- Family: Lauraceae
- Genus: Urbanodendron
- Species: U. bahiense

Binomial name
- Urbanodendron bahiense (Meisn.) Rohwer

Synonyms
- Mespilodaphne bahiensis Meisn.; Ocotea bahiensis Mez; Pleurothyrium bahiense (Mez) Barroso

Species of flowering plant

Urbanodendron bahiense is a species of flowering plant in the Lauraceae. It is a tree endemic to Rio de Janeiro, Brazil. The species epithet derives from the mistaken belief that the plant is from Bahia.
