= Ishpingo =

Ishpingo is a common name for several South American plants. The name is derived from the Quechua word ispinku which may be Hispanicized as ishpingo or eshpingo.

Ishpingo may refer to:

- Amburana cearensis, used to produce timber
- Nectandra, several species used medicinally
- Ocotea quixos, used as a spice
