= Syndiclis lotungensis =

Conservation status
- Critically Endangered (IUCN 3.1)

Scientific classification
- Kingdom: Plantae
- Clade: Tracheophytes
- Clade: Angiosperms
- Clade: Magnoliids
- Order: Laurales
- Family: Lauraceae
- Genus: Syndiclis
- Species: S. lotungensis

Binomial name
- Syndiclis lotungensis S.K.Lee

Synonyms
- Potameia lotungensis (S.K.Lee) Kim Dao

Species of flowering plant

Syndiclis lotungensis is a species of plant in the family Lauraceae. It is found in southern China (Hainan) and Vietnam.
