= Urbanodendron macrophyllum =

Conservation status
- Data Deficient (IUCN 3.1)

Scientific classification
- Kingdom: Plantae
- Clade: Tracheophytes
- Clade: Angiosperms
- Clade: Magnoliids
- Order: Laurales
- Family: Lauraceae
- Genus: Urbanodendron
- Species: U. macrophyllum

Binomial name
- Urbanodendron macrophyllum Rohwer

Species of flowering plant

Urbanodendron macrophyllum is a species of flowering plant in the family Lauraceae. It is a tree endemic to Rio de Janeiro state in southeastern Brazil.
