= Pleurothyrium giganthum =

Conservation status
- Endangered (IUCN 3.1)

Scientific classification
- Kingdom: Plantae
- Clade: Tracheophytes
- Clade: Angiosperms
- Clade: Magnoliids
- Order: Laurales
- Family: Lauraceae
- Genus: Pleurothyrium
- Species: P. giganthum

Binomial name
- Pleurothyrium giganthum van der Werff

Species of flowering plant

Pleurothyrium giganthum is a species of plant in the family Lauraceae. It is endemic to Ecuador. Its natural habitats are subtropical or tropical moist lowland forests and subtropical or tropical moist montane forests.
