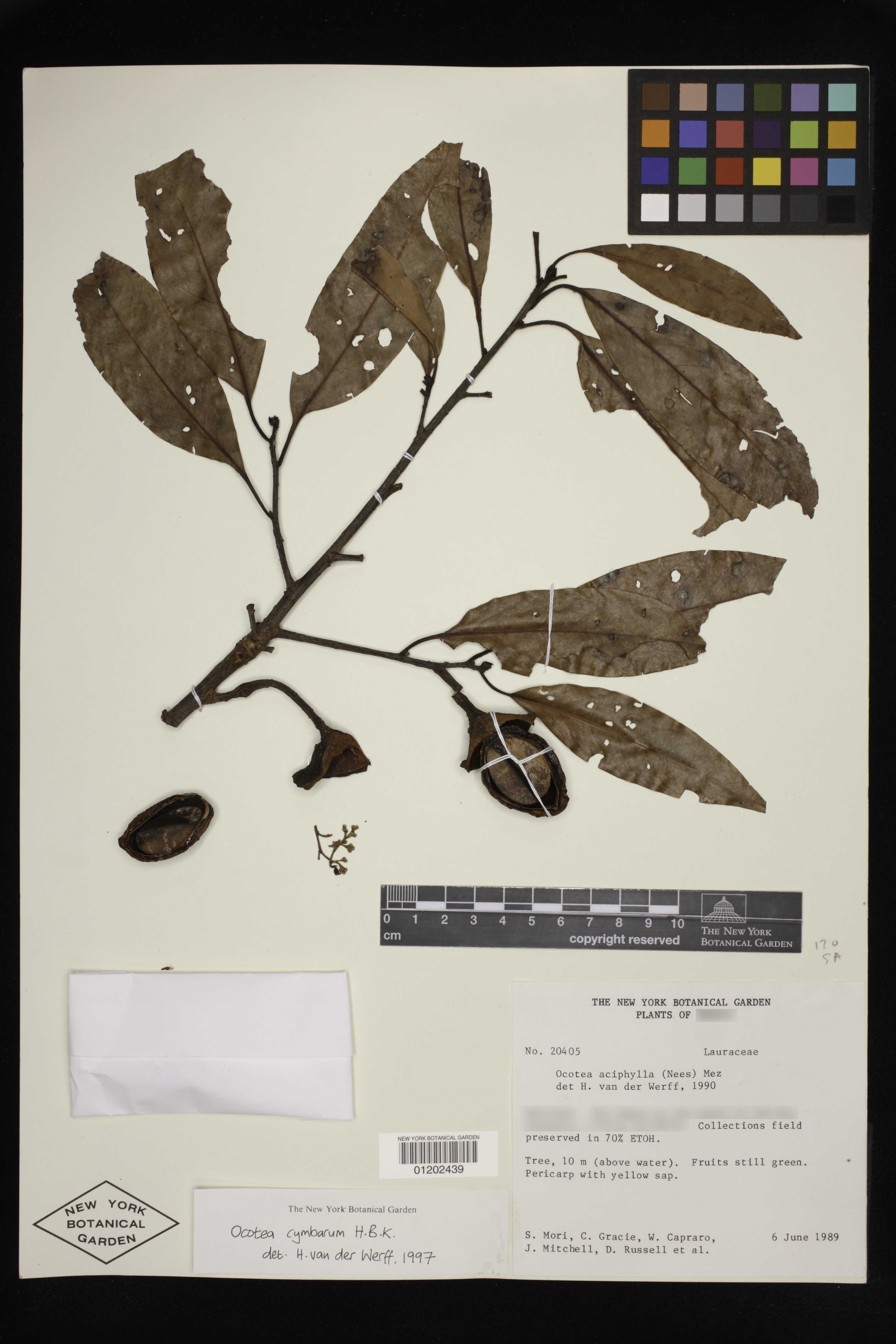

Conservation status
- Least Concern (IUCN 3.1)

Scientific classification
- Kingdom: Plantae
- Clade: Tracheophytes
- Clade: Angiosperms
- Clade: Magnoliids
- Order: Laurales
- Family: Lauraceae
- Genus: Mespilodaphne
- Species: M. cymbarum

Binomial name
- Mespilodaphne cymbarum (Kunth) Trofimov

Synonyms
- Alseodaphne amara (Mart.) Kostel.; Alseodaphne cymbarum (Kunth) Kostel.; Laurus coruscans Willd. ex Nees; Licaria cymbarum (Kunth) Pittier; Misanteca cymbarum (Kunth) Lundell; Nectandra amara Nees ex Meisn., not validly publ.; Nectandra barcellensis Meisn.; Nectandra caparrapii Sand.-Groot ex Nates; Nectandra cymbarum (Kunth) Nees; Nectandra elaiophora Barb.Rodr.; Nectandra oleifera Posada-Ar. ex Nates; Ocotea amara Mart. (1830); Ocotea amara Mart. (1831), nom. illeg.; Ocotea barcellensis (Meisn.) Mez; Ocotea caparrapii (Sand.-Groot ex Nates) Dugand; Ocotea cymbarum Kunth (basionym); Oreodaphne oleifera Posada-Ar.

= Mespilodaphne cymbarum =

Species of tree

Mespilodaphne cymbarum is a species of flowering plant in the family Lauraceae. It is an evergreen tree found in northern Brazil, Colombia, French Guiana, Guyana, Suriname, and Venezuela.

== Medical uses ==
The essential oils from Mespilodaphne cymbarum are often used in the synthesis of MDMA (contracted form of 3,4-methylenedioxy-methamphetamine); a psychoactive drug of the substituted methylenedioxyphenethylamine and substituted amphetamine classes of drugs that is consumed primarily for its euphoric and empathogenic effects. Pharmacologically, MDMA acts as a serotonin-norepinephrine-dopamine releasing agent and reuptake inhibitor.
