= Sinopora =

Sinopora may refer to:

- Sinopora (cnidarian), a fossil genus of cnidarians in the family Sinoporidae
- Sinopora (plant), a genus of plants in the family Lauraceae
