= Pleurothyrium hexaglandulosum =

Conservation status
- Endangered (IUCN 3.1)

Scientific classification
- Kingdom: Plantae
- Clade: Tracheophytes
- Clade: Angiosperms
- Clade: Magnoliids
- Order: Laurales
- Family: Lauraceae
- Genus: Pleurothyrium
- Species: P. hexaglandulosum

Binomial name
- Pleurothyrium hexaglandulosum van der Werff

Species of flowering plant

Pleurothyrium hexaglandulosum is a species of flowering plant in the family Lauraceae. It is a tree native to Costa Rica and Panama.
