= Pleurothyrium obovatum =

Conservation status
- Endangered (IUCN 3.1)

Scientific classification
- Kingdom: Plantae
- Clade: Tracheophytes
- Clade: Angiosperms
- Clade: Magnoliids
- Order: Laurales
- Family: Lauraceae
- Genus: Pleurothyrium
- Species: P. obovatum

Binomial name
- Pleurothyrium obovatum van der Werff

Species of flowering plant

Pleurothyrium obovatum is a species of plant in the family Lauraceae. It is endemic to Ecuador. Its natural habitat is subtropical or tropical moist montane forests.
