= Caryodaphnopsis cogolloi =

Conservation status
- Endangered (IUCN 3.1)

Scientific classification
- Kingdom: Plantae
- Clade: Tracheophytes
- Clade: Angiosperms
- Clade: Magnoliids
- Order: Laurales
- Family: Lauraceae
- Genus: Caryodaphnopsis
- Species: C. cogolloi

Binomial name
- Caryodaphnopsis cogolloi van der Werff

Species of flowering plant

Caryodaphnopsis cogolloi is a species of plant in the family Lauraceae endemic to Colombia.
