= Yasunia =

Scientific classification
- Kingdom: Plantae
- Clade: Embryophytes
- Clade: Tracheophytes
- Clade: Angiosperms
- Clade: Magnoliids
- Order: Laurales
- Family: Lauraceae
- Genus: Yasunia van der Werff

Species
- See text

Genus of flowering plants

Yasunia is a genus of flowering plants in the family Lauraceae, found in Ecuador and Peru. Yasunia appears to be nested within Beilschmiedia.

== Species ==
Currently accepted species include:

- Yasunia quadrata van der Werff
- Yasunia sessiliflora van der Werff
