= Paraia =

Conservation status
- Least Concern (IUCN 3.1)

Scientific classification
- Kingdom: Plantae
- Clade: Tracheophytes
- Clade: Angiosperms
- Clade: Magnoliids
- Order: Laurales
- Family: Lauraceae
- Genus: Paraia; Rohwer, H.G.Richt. & van der Werff
- Species: P. bracteata

Binomial name
- Paraia bracteata Rohwer, H.G. Richt. & van der Werff

Genus of flowering plants

Paraia is a genus of plant in family Lauraceae. It is a Neotropical genus with just one species, Paraia bracteata, native to the south-east of Brazil.

The genus was described in 1991. Paraia is a hardwood evergreen tree that usually grows to 8 m tall; one individual has been recorded as 20 m. It occurs in an extensive area in the Brazilian states of Pará and Amazonas, in the drainage area of the Amazon Basin to the Atlantic rainforest of southern Brazil at the Trombetas River. The fruit is a berry.
