= Aspidostemon =

Scientific classification
- Kingdom: Plantae
- Clade: Tracheophytes
- Clade: Angiosperms
- Clade: Magnoliids
- Order: Laurales
- Family: Lauraceae
- Genus: Aspidostemon; Rohwer & H.G.Richt.

Species
- See text

Synonyms
- Cryptocarya subgen. Hexanthera Kosterm.; Cryptocarya subgen. Trianthera Kosterm.

Genus of flowering plants

Aspidostemon is a genus of flowering plants belonging to the family Lauraceae. It occurs in Madagascar.

== Taxonomy ==
The genus was described by Jens Gunter Rohwer & Hans Georg Richter in Jahrbuch für Botanische Systematik, Pflanzengeschichte und Pflanzengeographie 109 (1): 74 in 1987. The type species is Aspidostemon perrieri (Danguy) Rohwer. The number of collections available is not large. The identification was done at the Missouri Botanical Garden.

== Description ==
They are shrubs or trees up to 25 m high, hermaphrodites. The leaves are entire, elliptical or narrowly elliptical. The fruit is a berry-like drupe dispersed mostly by birds. Aspidostemon species are no exception among the Lauraceae; they are trees with small flowers, hard to detect and collect and often overlooked or ignored when plants easier to collect or with showier flowers are at hand.

Aspidostemon is characterized by its opposite leaves, flowers with three or six stamens (compared to 9 in Cryptocarya), and a fruit which is completely enclosed in the enlarged hypanthium with persistent floral parts attached to the top of the fruit. When the genus was described by Rohwer & Richter in 1987, they recognized 11 species, but today 28 species are accepted. Some species are endangered or almost extinct. Based on a combination of wood anatomical, vegetative, and floral characters, noted by such earlier botanists as Kostermans in 1957, the species of genus Aspidostemon were placed formerly as belonging to subgenera Hexanthera and Trianthera of Cryptocarya.

== Ecology ==
Aspidostemon species have the large trees characteristic of rainforest in montane laurel forest habitats in Madagascar and nearby islands and restricted to this region. They belong to an ancient isolated Gondwanian element of Laurales. A great number of species are in danger of extinction due to overexploitation as timber extraction and loss of habitat.

They are leafy canopy trees with erect or spreading branches. They grow to heights of up to 25 m, or some species to 40 m. Their stout trunks are up to 1 m in diameter. The genus is easily recognizable by its bark which is soft and cheese-like. The thick, leathery leaves are dark green. The leaves are glossy laurel type. The leaves of Aspidostemon species are not infrequently acuminate, with an acumen folded into a short tube. On opening a few of these inrolled apices, egg cases similar to those found in leaf domatia are found; epiphyllous hepatics were also found. These inrolled apices apparently function as domatia and shelter mites that clean the leaves.

The fruit is an important food source for birds, usually from specialized genera. Birds eat the whole fruit and regurgitate or defecate the seeds intact, expanding the seeds in the best conditions for germination (ornithochory). In some species, seed dispersal is carried out by mammals.

== Accepted species ==
As of September 2026, the following 31 species are accepted by Plants of the World Online:

- Aspidostemon andohahelensis van der Werff
- Aspidostemon antongilensis van der Werff
- Aspidostemon apiculatus van der Werff
- Aspidostemon capuronii van der Werff
- Aspidostemon caudatus Rohwer
- Aspidostemon conoideus van der Werff
- Aspidostemon dolichocarpus (Kosterm.) Rohwer
- Aspidostemon dorrii van der Werff
- Aspidostemon fungiformis van der Werff
- Aspidostemon glaber van der Werff
- Aspidostemon glandulosus Rohwer
- Aspidostemon grayi van der Werff
- Aspidostemon humbertianus (Kosterm.) Rohwer
- Aspidostemon inconspicuus Rohwer
- Aspidostemon insignis van der Werff
- Aspidostemon lacrimans (Kosterm.) Rohwer
- Aspidostemon litoralis van der Werff
- Aspidostemon longipedicellatus van der Werff
- Aspidostemon lucens van der Werff
- Aspidostemon macrophyllus van der Werff
- Aspidostemon manongarivensis van der Werff
- Aspidostemon masoalensis van der Werff
- Aspidostemon microphyllus van der Werff
- Aspidostemon occultus van der Werff
- Aspidostemon parvifolius (Scott Elliot) van der Werff
- Aspidostemon percoriaceus (Kosterm.) Rohwer
- Aspidostemon perrieri (Danguy) Rohwer
- Aspidostemon reticulatus van der Werff
- Aspidostemon synandra Rohwer
- Aspidostemon trianthera (Kosterm.) Rohwer
- Aspidostemon trichandra van der Werff
