= Parasassafras =

Conservation status
- Least Concern (IUCN 3.1)

Scientific classification
- Kingdom: Plantae
- Clade: Tracheophytes
- Clade: Angiosperms
- Clade: Magnoliids
- Order: Laurales
- Family: Lauraceae
- Genus: Parasassafras; D.G.Long
- Species: P. confertiflora

Binomial name
- Parasassafras confertiflora (Meisn.) D.G.Long

Synonyms
- Actinodaphne confertiflora Meisn.; Litsea confertiflora (Meisn.) Kosterm.; Neocinnamomum confertiflorum (Meisn.) Kosterm.

Genus of flowering plants

Parasassafras is a monotypic genus of flowering plants in the family Lauraceae, containing the single species Parasassafras confertiflora.

P. confertiflora is native to the eastern Himalayas, northern Myanmar, and Yunnan Province of China.
