= Sextonia =

Scientific classification
- Kingdom: Plantae
- Clade: Tracheophytes
- Clade: Angiosperms
- Clade: Magnoliids
- Order: Laurales
- Family: Lauraceae
- Genus: Sextonia van der Werff

Genus of plants

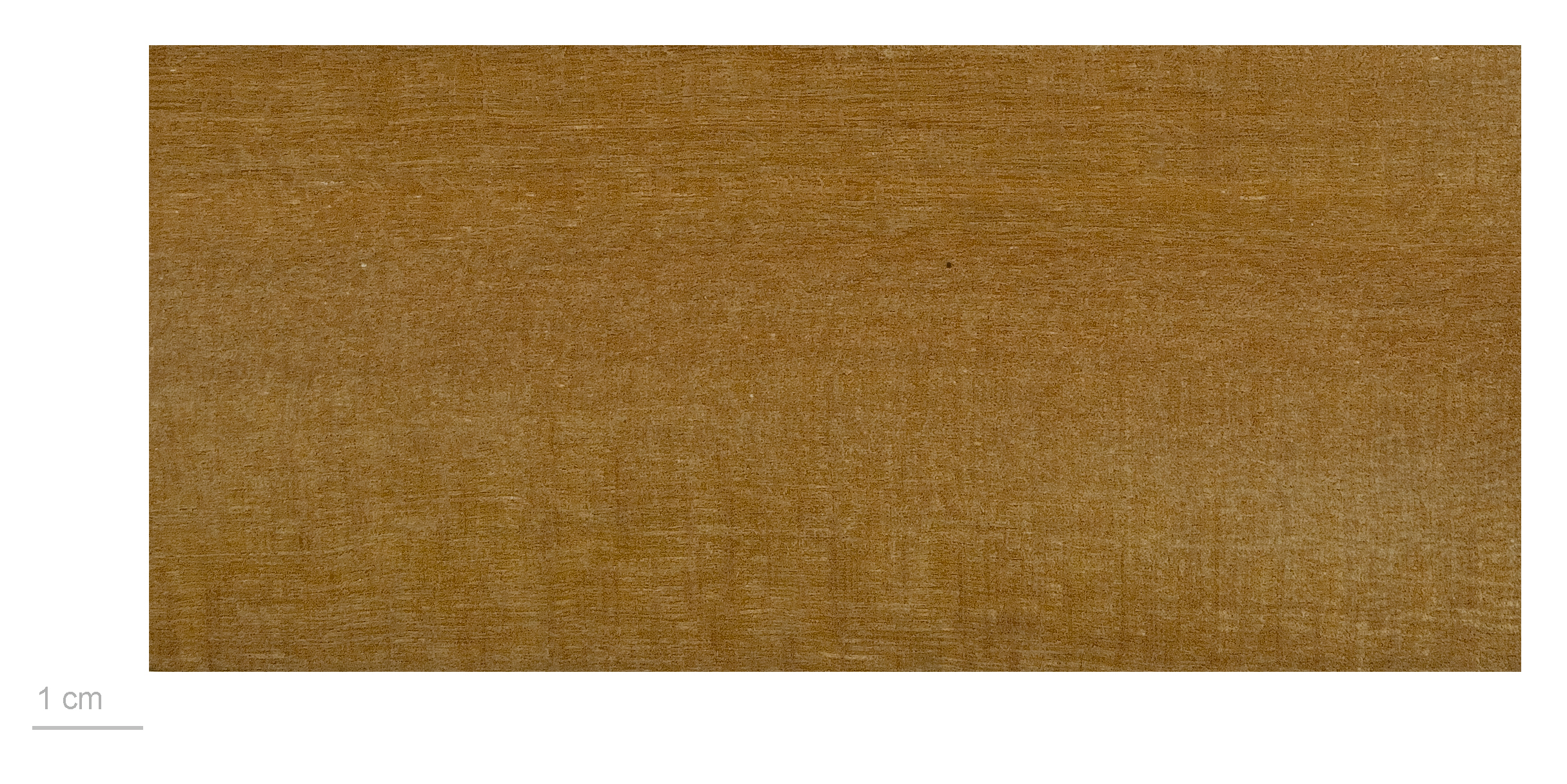
Sextonia rubra wood - MHNT

Sextonia is a neotropical genus of plants in the family Lauraceae, native to South America. There are two species. They grow in moist forest from 900 to 1600 m.

The flowers are hermaphrodite. Occurring in Northern South America: Bolivia, Peru, Colombia, Ecuador, Venezuela, Guyana, Surinam, French Guiana and Brazil: in the river valleys of Amapa, Maranhao and Para. In the Caribbean area: Trinidad and Tobago.

== Species ==
The genus contains the following species:

- Sextonia pubescens van der Werff
- Sextonia rubra (Mez) van der Werff, common name red louro
