= Potoxylon =

Conservation status
- Least Concern (IUCN 3.1)

Scientific classification
- Kingdom: Plantae
- Clade: Tracheophytes
- Clade: Angiosperms
- Clade: Magnoliids
- Order: Laurales
- Family: Lauraceae
- Genus: Potoxylon; Kosterm.
- Species: P. melagangai

Binomial name
- Potoxylon melagangai (Symington) Kosterm.

Synonyms
- Eusideroxylon melagangai Symington

Genus of plants

Potoxylon is a monotypic genus of evergreen trees belonging to the Laurel family, Lauraceae. Its only species, Potoxylon melagangai, is endemic to Borneo.

== Description ==
Potoxylon melagangai is an evergreen tree which grows up to 25 metres tall. It has gray bark. Leaves are alternate, simple, leathery, with entire margins and pinnate venation. The inflorescences are grouped in axillary spikes. The flowers are bisexual and actinomorphic with six tepals in two whorls, 9 stamens in three whorls, the ovary superior and unilocular. The fruit, a berry-like drupe, is ellipsoid and dispersed by birds.

== Range and habitat ==
Potoxylon melagangai is endemic to Borneo, where it is known from western Sabah and northern Sarawak (Malaysia), Brunei, and East Kalimantan (Indonesia).

It grows in lowland rain forests from 400 to 625 metres elevation.

== Evolutionary history ==
Phylogenetic analysis shows that Potoxylon diverged early from other Lauraceae. Potoxylon, like the related genus Eusideroxylon, has an evolutionary history that is difficult to resolve because of the complex geological history of its native range, which has components from both the Gondwanan and Laurasian supercontinents, and consequently it is unclear whether Potoxylon evolved on Gondwana.
