= Syndiclis =

Scientific classification
- Kingdom: Plantae
- Clade: Tracheophytes
- Clade: Angiosperms
- Clade: Magnoliids
- Order: Laurales
- Family: Lauraceae
- Genus: Syndiclis; Hook.f.

Genus of plants

Syndiclis is a genus of flowering plants in the family Lauraceae. It contains ten species, which are native to China (seven species), Vietnam and Hainan (two species), and Bhutan (one species).

== Characteristics ==
Evergreen trees with lauroid leaves subopposite or alternate, or clustered at apex of branchlet, pinninerved. Panicle axillary, pedunculate, bracteate or ebracteate; bracts and bracteoles subulate, minute, caducous. Small flowers bisexual, pedicellate, 2-merous. Perianth tube obconical; perianth 4 or 5 or 6 lobes, broadly ovate-triangular or transversely oblong, small; perianth wholly deciduous. 4 or 5 or 6 fertile stamens, antitepalous, always exserted, hairy and glandular; filaments short; anthers broadly ovate, dilated, 2-celled or fused into 1 cell; cells introrse. 4 small staminodes, linear or lanceolate, densely hairy, enveloping ovary in an arc when in bud. Ovary ovoid-conical, glabrous, attenuate at apex into a style; stigma is small. The fruit is a large berry, a drupe containing a single seed. The berry is globose or turbinate or oblate. The peduncle and pedicel is indistinctive when in fruit, all thickened after anthesis. Plants of Syndiclis have large oily fruits and the oil extracted is edible and is also used in industry.

== Ecology ==
Evergreen endemic species of the tropical seasonal semi-deciduous montane forests, Cloud forest from 1000 to 1600 m. The ecological requirements of the genus are those of the laurel forest and like most of their counterparts laurifolia in the world, they are vigorous species with a great ability to populate the habitat that is conducive. The natural habitat is rainforest which is cloud-covered for much of the year. The species is found in forests that face threats of destruction by human deforestation.

Because of the special lack of worldwide knowledge about the family lauraceae in general, very little is known about their diversity. Recent monographs of the small and medium genera of lauraceae with up to 100 species per genus have produced a high increase in the number of known species. This high increase is expected for other genera as well, particularly for those with more than 150 species recorded, bringing an expected considerable increase in the total number of species of the family.

A related vegetal community evolved millions of years ago on the supercontinent of Gondwana, and species of this community are now found on several separate areas of the Southern Hemisphere, including South America, Africa, New Zealand, Australia and New Caledonia.

== Accepted species ==
Ten species are accepted:

- Syndiclis anlungensis H.W.Li – China (southwestern Guizhou)
- Syndiclis chinensis C.K.Allen – Vietnam and southern Hainan
- Syndiclis fooningensis H.W.Li – China (southeastern Yunnan)
- Syndiclis furfuracea H.W.Li – China (southeastern Yunnan)
- Syndiclis kwangsiensis (Kostermans) H.W.Li – China (southwestern Guangxi)
- Syndiclis lotungensis S.K.Lee – Vietnam and southwestern Hainan
- Syndiclis marlipoensis H.W.Li – China (southeastern Yunnan)
- Syndiclis paradoxa Hook.f. – Bhutan
- Syndiclis pingbienensis H.W.Li – China (southeastern Yunnan)
- Syndiclis sichourensis H.W.Li – China (southeastern Yunnan)
