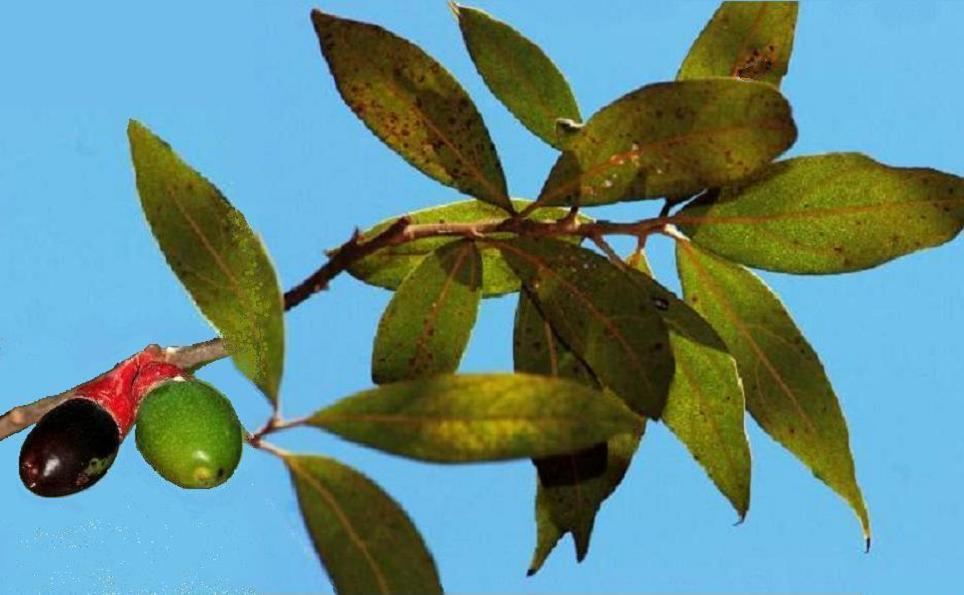
- Endlicheria paniculata

Scientific classification
- Kingdom: Plantae
- Clade: Tracheophytes
- Clade: Angiosperms
- Clade: Magnoliids
- Order: Laurales
- Family: Lauraceae
- Genus: Endlicheria; Nees

Species
- See text

Synonyms
- Ampelodaphne Meisn.; Goeppertia Nees (1836), nom. illeg., not Nees (1831); Huberodaphne Ducke

= Endlicheria =

Genus of flowering plants

Endlicheria is a neotropical plant genus consisting of approximately 60 species, occurring mostly in northern South America and the Amazon region. Most species are medium-sized trees, sometime up to 40 metres in height, but a few species are shrubs. DNA molecular data shows that it is closely related to Rhodostemonodaphne and Ocotea.

This genus has many species of high commercial value to the wood industry.

Endlicheria species occur mostly in the drainage area of the Amazon from South America, and low coast rainforest and mountain tropical forest in the Greater Antilles, Guianas, Ecuador, Colombia, Venezuela, Peru, Bolivia, Paraguay, to the south of Brazil, and in the Andean cloud forest in tropical America. The species of Endlicheria occur in moist forest habitats from elevations of around sea level to 2.500 meters in the Andean and Guianian highlands. At least two species are present in mountain cloud forest and Atlantic forest of south east Brazil, and two other species in Caribbean Lesser Antilles mountain cloud forest.

== Taxonomy ==
Traditionally, Endlicheria was placed near Aniba and the other Lauraceae with two locellate anthers. However, it has been suggested that the two-locellate anthers that distinguish Endlicheria from Rhodostemonodaphne evolved repeatedly. The two genera form a group of approximately 100 known species.

== Characteristics ==
Leaves congested at the apex of the branches, flowers in panicles with racemose endings.

The plants are dioecious, i.e., male and female flowers appear on different trees.

== Species ==
60 species are accepted.

- Endlicheria acuminata Kosterm.
- Endlicheria anomala (Nees) Mez
- Endlicheria arachnocome Chanderb.
- Endlicheria arenosa Chanderb.
- Endlicheria argentea Chanderb.
- Endlicheria arunciflora (Meisn.) Mez
- Endlicheria aurea Chanderb.
- Endlicheria bracteata Mez
- Endlicheria bracteolata (Meisn.) C.K.Allen
- Endlicheria browniana (Meisn.) Mez
- Endlicheria bullata Ducke
- Endlicheria canescens Chanderbali
- Endlicheria chalisea Chanderbali
- Endlicheria chrysovelutina Chanderb.
- Endlicheria citriodora van der Werff
- Endlicheria cocuirey Kosterm.
- Endlicheria columbiana (Meissner) Mez
- Endlicheria coriacea Chanderb.
- Endlicheria dictifarinosa C.K.Allen
- Endlicheria directonervia C.K.Allen
- Endlicheria duotincta Chanderb.
- Endlicheria dysodantha (Ruiz & Pav.) Mez
- Endlicheria ferruginosa Chanderb.
- Endlicheria formosa A.C.Sm.
- Endlicheria glomerata Mez
- Endlicheria gracilis Kosterm.
- Endlicheria griseosericea Chanderb.
- Endlicheria jefensis van der Werff ex Chanderb.
- Endlicheria klugii O.C.Schmidt
- Endlicheria krukovii (A.C.Sm.) Kosterm.
- Endlicheria levelii C.K.Allen
- Endlicheria lhotzkyi (Nees) Mez
- Endlicheria longicaudata (Ducke) Kosterm.
- Endlicheria lorastemon Chanderb.
- Endlicheria macrophylla (Meisn.) Mez
- Endlicheria melinonii Benoist
- Endlicheria metallica Kosterm.
- Endlicheria mishuyacensis A.C.Sm.
- Endlicheria multiflora (Miq.) Mez
- Endlicheria nilssonii C.K.Allen
- Endlicheria oreocola Chanderb.
- Endlicheria paniculata (Spreng.) J.F.Macbr.
- Endlicheria paradoxa Mez
- Endlicheria punctulata (Mez) C.K.Allen
- Endlicheria pyriformis (Nees) Mez
- Endlicheria reflectens (Nees) Mez
- Endlicheria robusta (A.C.Sm.) Kosterm.
- Endlicheria rubra Chanderb.
- Endlicheria rubriflora Mez
- Endlicheria ruforamula Chanderb.
- Endlicheria sericea Nees
- Endlicheria sprucei (Meisn.) Mez
- Endlicheria szyszylowiczii Mez
- Endlicheria tessmannii O.C.Schmidt
- Endlicheria tomentosa Chanderb.
- Endlicheria tschudyana (Lasser) Kosterm.
- Endlicheria verticillata Mez
- Endlicheria vinotincta C.K.Allen
- Endlicheria williamsii O.C.Schmidt
- Endlicheria xerampela Chanderb.
