= Cinnadenia =

Scientific classification
- Kingdom: Plantae
- Clade: Tracheophytes
- Clade: Angiosperms
- Clade: Magnoliids
- Order: Laurales
- Family: Lauraceae
- Genus: Cinnadenia; Kosterm.

Species
- Cinnadenia liyuyingii (H.Liu) de Kok & Sengun; Cinnadenia malayana Kosterm.; Cinnadenia paniculata (Hook.f.) Kosterm.

Genus of flowering plants

Cinnadenia is a flowering plant genus belonging to the family Lauraceae. They are present in low and mountain cloud forests in Southeast Asia.

The genus was described originally from Vietnam by André Joseph Guillaume Henri Kostermans, and published in 1973. The type species is Cinnadenia paniculata.

== Description ==
The Cinnadenia are trees can grow up to 40 meters tall, though most are between 3 and 30 meters. They are hermaphrodites, and some species grow slowly as canopy trees. The leaves are alternate, entire, and elliptical or narrowly elliptical; they are 10 to 25 cm long and 3 to 8 cm wide. Many species have valuable timber; others´ wood and bark are pleasantly scented, like most of the genera of the Lauraceae, such as Cinnamomum. The oils extracted are used as ingredients in the manufacture of perfumes.

== Species ==
Three species are accepted.

- Cinnadenia liyuyingii (H.Liu) de Kok & Sengun – southern Yunnan, Laos, and northern Vietnam
- Cinnadenia malayana Kosterm. – Peninsular Malaysia
- Cinnadenia paniculata (Hook.f.) Kosterm. – Bhutan, Assam, and Myanmar

== Ecology ==
They grow in evergreen tropical forests. Species in less humid environment are smaller or less robust, with less abundant and thinner foliage and have oleifera cells that give trees a more fragrant aroma. It is present in the Himalayas Mountain cloud forest in Bhutan, Assam, Myanmar, and Vietnam. They grow also in evergreen lowlands tropical laurel forests. They do not form large stands, but rather small groups of trees with a density of up to one individual per five hectares.

The ecological requirements of the genus are those of fog moisture precipitating almost continuously in a natural habitat, cloud-covered for much of the year. These species are found in tropical forests, subtropical temperate evergreen, or montane evergreen forests, which are a type of rainforest or cloud forest. The ecosystem is characterized by high humidity, no seasonal changes, and a wide variety of botanical and zoological species, but also highly fragile against external aggressions. The temperate evergreen and evergreen forests are typically multispecies with evergreen and hardwood trees, reaching up to 40 m in height. The forests are made up of laurel-leaved evergreen hardwood trees, harbouring a rich biota of understorey plants, invertebrates, birds, and mammals. It is present in tropical and subtropical montane rainforest, laurel forest, in the weed-tree forests in valleys, mixed forests of coniferous and deciduous broad-leaved trees, Tsuga forests; 2,000–2,600 metres (6,600–8,500 ft) from northern Vietnam to the Himalayas.

Cinnadenia species require continuously moist soil, and do not tolerate drought. The laurel trees falls within the broad-leaved forests; mid-montane deciduous forests; and high-montane mixed stunted forests. Some species growing to high elevation forests at 1,500–3,300 metres (4,900–10,800 ft). Three taxa are commonly found at tree line: an evergreen, needle-leaved gymnosperm (Abies pindrow Spach.), an evergreen, broad-leaved sclerophyllous oak (Quercus semecarpifolia Sm.), and a deciduous, broad-leaved birch (Betula utilis Don). Vernal flowering is common at this elevation in Central Himalaya. In general, in their elevational distribution and structural-functional attributes, these high-elevation forests are similar to other forests of cool temperate zones in Himalaya.

The most known trees are used by the timber industry.

In 2025, the Cinnadenia malayana is on The Red List of Threatened Species as ‘Vulnerable’.
