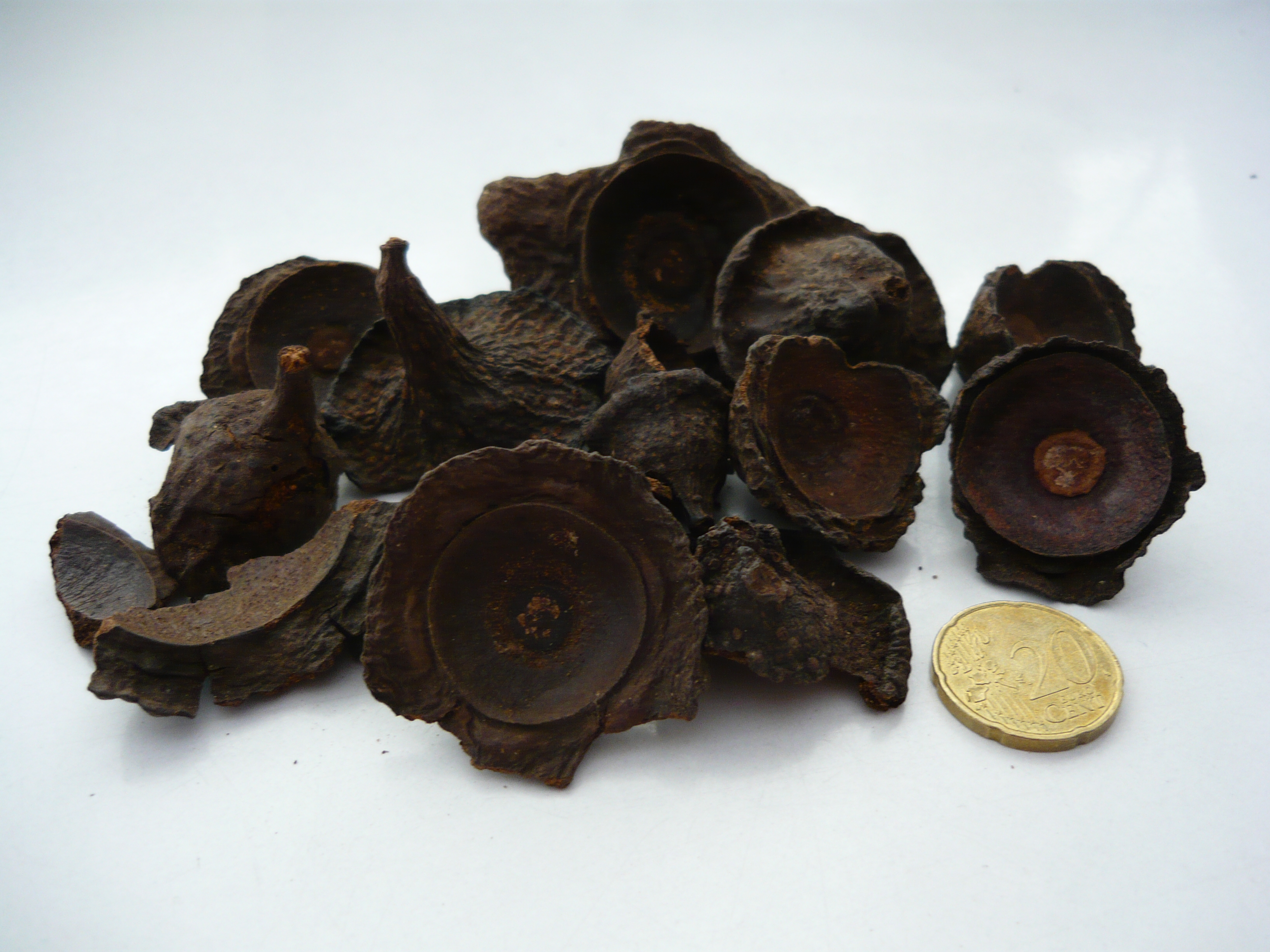
- Dried ispinku (O. quixos) cupules

Conservation status
- Least Concern (IUCN 3.1)

Scientific classification
- Kingdom: Plantae
- Clade: Tracheophytes
- Clade: Angiosperms
- Clade: Magnoliids
- Order: Laurales
- Family: Lauraceae
- Genus: Mespilodaphne
- Species: M. quixos

Binomial name
- Mespilodaphne quixos (Lam.) Rohwer

Synonyms
- Acrodiclidium cinnamomoides (Mutis ex Kunth) Mez; Borbonia peruviana Juss. ex Steud.; Laurus cinnamomoides Mutis ex Kunth; Laurus quixos Lam. (basionym); Licaria quixos (Lam.) Kosterm.; Mespilodaphne pretiosa Nees & Mart., nom. superfl.; Mespilodaphne pretiosa var. angustifolia Nees, nom. superfl.; Misanteca quixos (Lam.) Lundell; Nectandra cinnamomoides (Mutis ex Kunth) Nees; Ocotea cinnamomoides (Mutis ex Kunth) Kosterm.; Ocotea quixos (Lam.) Kosterm.

= Mespilodaphne quixos =

Species of tree

Mespilodaphne quixos is a species of evergreen tree in the family Lauraceae, native to Ecuador, Colombia, and Peru. It is one of the South American trees with a cinnamon-like aroma and is used as a spice called ispinku in Southern Quechua or ishpinku in Kichwa (Hispanicized spellings ishpingo, eshpingo).

It is native to lowland and foothill rainforests in the western Amazon Basin below 1000 meters elevation.

== Growth ==
Ispinku seeds have a diameter of almost 1 inch and grow in soil which is mildly acidic. It grows at an annual rate of roughly 6 inches for the first three years of its life. After flowering starts, the flowers are produced once every two years.

== Use as a flavouring ==
The bark is used to produce 'Ecuadorian' (or 'American') cinnamon which bears some resemblance to common cinnamon (which also comes from a tree in this family). The tree is known in Quechua languages as ispinku, which specifically refers to the flowers, and more recently as Flor de Canela.

The taste of Ecuadorian cinnamon is thought to come from the presence of methyl cinnamate and trans-cinnamaldehyde which are also found in the essential oils which come from the flower calices of the plant.

Some reports show it has been used as a flavouring since Incaic times, and modern Ecuadorians still use this spice during general cooking and the production of food for rituals. Offerings to family ancestors for the Day of the Dead for example. These include food such as colada morada (purple pudding) and beverages such as the alcoholic drink alajua, both of which require the use of ispinku as a key ingredient.

== Medicinal uses ==
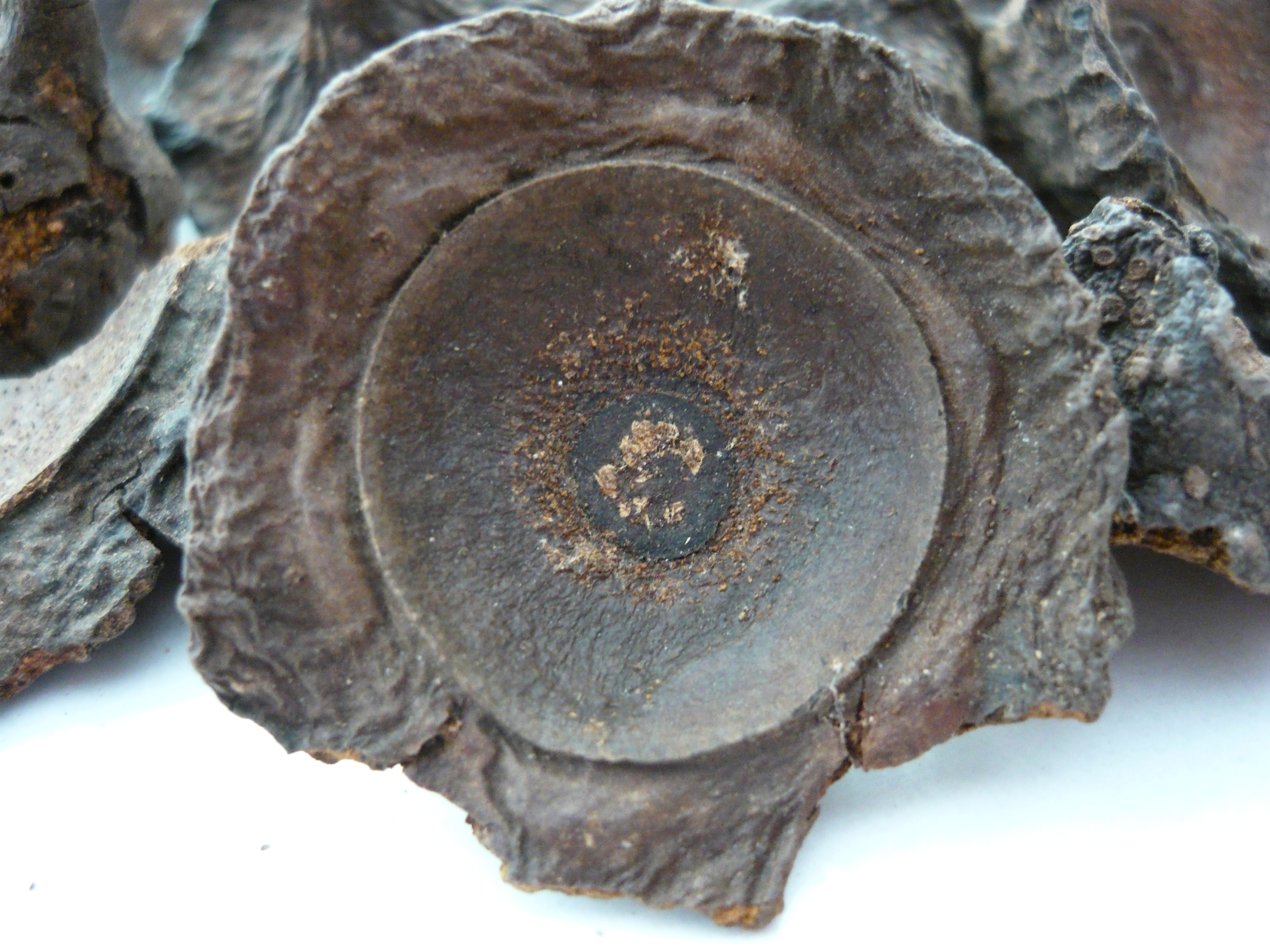
front cupule

The oils have previously been used in the traditional medicine of some Amazonian tribes for their anti-inflammatory properties and some peer-reviewed data also support this theory. Investigation of trans-cinnamaldehyde showed that it significantly reduced the production of NO by macrophages (cells of the immune system), which is something that normally occurs during inflammation. The same study of methyl cinnamate did not show this effect. It has also been shown that this oil can reduce the chance of blood clot formation by preventing platelet aggregation in the blood.
