= Rhodostemonodaphne =

Scientific classification
- Kingdom: Plantae
- Clade: Tracheophytes
- Clade: Angiosperms
- Clade: Magnoliids
- Order: Laurales
- Family: Lauraceae
- Genus: Rhodostemonodaphne; Rohwer & Kubitzki

Species
- See text

Synonyms
- Synandrodaphne Meisn.

Genus of flowering plants

Rhodostemonodaphne is a genus of flowering plants in the family Lauraceae. It is a neotropical genus consisting of approximately 41 species occurring in Central America and northern South America. This genus has many species that are valued for timber. The classification of the genus is unclear since the species in the genus fall into a well-supported but unresolved clade that also includes species with unisexual flowers currently placed in the genera Endlicheria and part of Ocotea.

== Description ==
Rhodostemonodaphne are shrubs and trees up to 30 m tall, mostly hardwood evergreen trees. They are dioecious (male and female flowers are on separate trees). The stamens have four locelli situated in a shallow arch towards the apex of the anthers. The leaves are alternately arranged, elliptic with recurved margins, and thin (chartaceous). The inflorescence of small flowers is a panicle with racemose terminations.

== Species ==
41 species are accepted.

- Rhodostemonodaphne anomala (Mez) Rohwer
- Rhodostemonodaphne antioquensis Madriñán
- Rhodostemonodaphne avilensis Madriñán
- Rhodostemonodaphne capixabensis Baitello & Coe-Teix.
- Rhodostemonodaphne celiana (C.K.Allen) Rohwer
- Rhodostemonodaphne crenaticupula Madriñán
- Rhodostemonodaphne curicuriariensis Madriñán
- Rhodostemonodaphne cyclops Madriñán
- Rhodostemonodaphne debilis (Kosterm.) Chanderb.
- Rhodostemonodaphne dioica (Mez) Rohwer
- Rhodostemonodaphne elephantopus Madriñán
- Rhodostemonodaphne frontinensis Madriñán
- Rhodostemonodaphne grandis (Mez) Rohwer
- Rhodostemonodaphne juruensis (A.C. Sm.) Chanderbali
- Rhodostemonodaphne kunthiana (Nees) Rohwer
- Rhodostemonodaphne laxa Rohwer
- Rhodostemonodaphne leptoclada Madriñán
- Rhodostemonodaphne licanioides (A.C. Sm.) Madriñán
- Rhodostemonodaphne longiflora Madriñán
- Rhodostemonodaphne longipetiolata Madriñán
- Rhodostemonodaphne macrocalyx (Meisn.) Rohwer ex Madriñán
- Rhodostemonodaphne miranda (Sandwith) Rohwer
- Rhodostemonodaphne mirecolorata (C.K. Allen) Rohwer
- Rhodostemonodaphne morii Madriñán
- Rhodostemonodaphne napoensis Madriñán
- Rhodostemonodaphne negrensis Madriñán
- Rhodostemonodaphne ovatifolia Madriñán
- Rhodostemonodaphne parvifolia Madriñán
- Rhodostemonodaphne peneia Madriñán
- Rhodostemonodaphne praeclara (Sandwith) Madriñán
- Rhodostemonodaphne recurva van der Werff
- Rhodostemonodaphne revolutifolia Madriñán
- Rhodostemonodaphne rufovirgata Madriñán
- Rhodostemonodaphne saulensis Madriñán
- Rhodostemonodaphne scandens Madriñán
- Rhodostemonodaphne sordida Madriñán
- Rhodostemonodaphne steyermarkiana (C.K.Allen) van der Werff
- Rhodostemonodaphne synandra van der Werff
- Rhodostemonodaphne tumucumaquensis Madriñán
- Rhodostemonodaphne velutina (Mez) Madriñán
