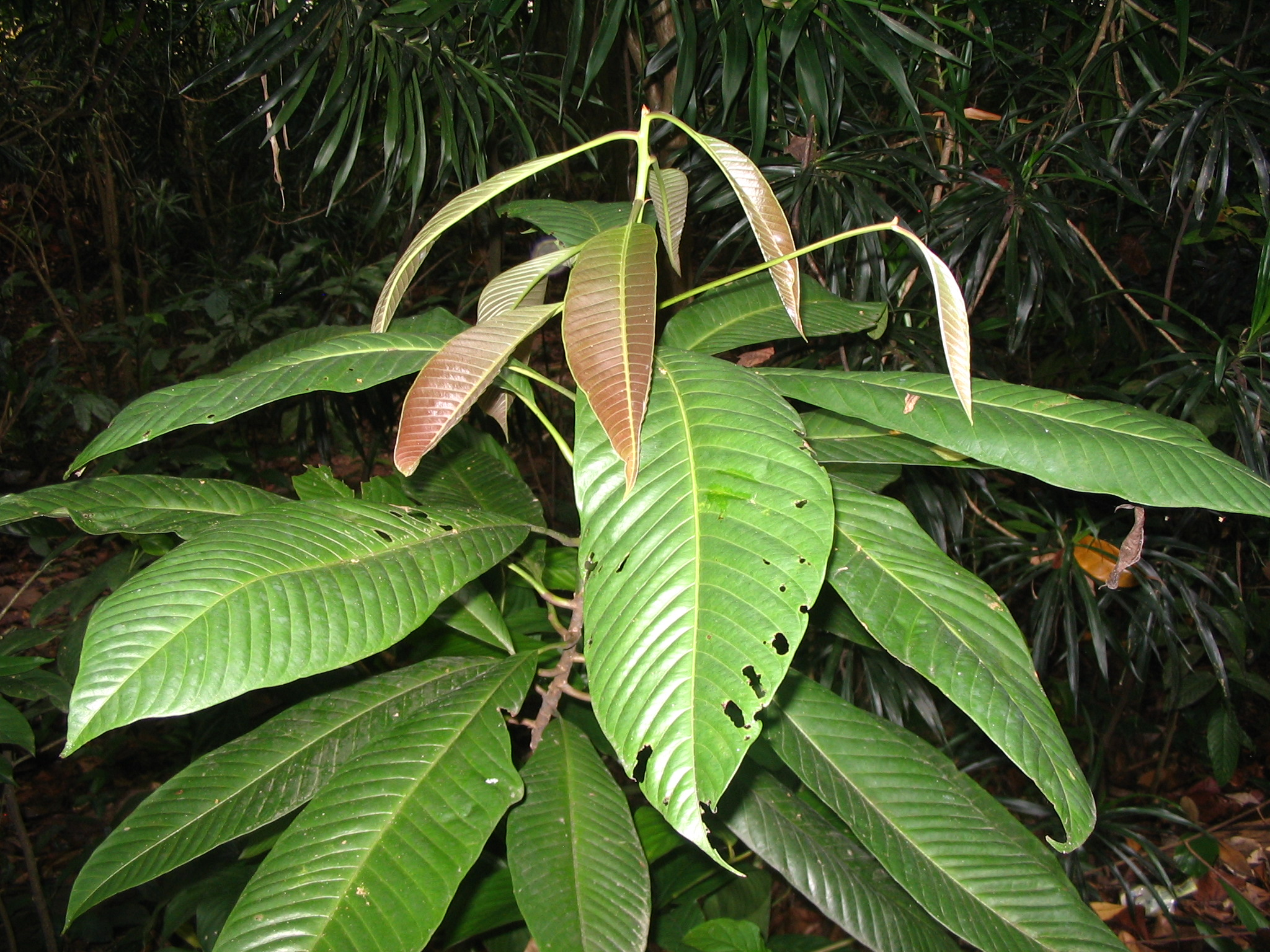
- Young tree of Eusideroxylon zwageri

Conservation status
- Vulnerable (IUCN 3.1)

Scientific classification
- Kingdom: Plantae
- Clade: Tracheophytes
- Clade: Angiosperms
- Clade: Magnoliids
- Order: Laurales
- Family: Lauraceae
- Genus: Eusideroxylon; Teijsm. & Binn.
- Species: E. zwageri

Binomial name
- Eusideroxylon zwageri Teijsm. & Binn.

Synonyms
- Bihania borneensis Meisn. Eusideroxylon borneense Fern.-Vill.

= Eusideroxylon =

Genus of flowering plants

Eusideroxylon is a genus of evergreen trees of the family Lauraceae. The genus is monotypic, and includes one accepted species, Eusideroxylon zwageri. The species is commonly known as Bornean ironwood, or by the Malay names belian and ulin. It is predominantly found in Borneo and Sumatra, where it grows in lowland rainforests, but may also occur in the Philippines. The Bornean ironwood is an extremely slow growing tree, reaching up to 50 metres (160 ft) in height, with trunks over 2 metres (6 ft 7 in) in diameter.

Eusideroxylon is classified as a hardwood tree, producing commercially valuable timber known for its high durability, as well as resistance to termites, rot, and fungi. This wood can last up to 100 years in contact with the ground. Due to extensive logging, it is listed as vulnerable in the IUCN Red List.

== Nomenclature ==
The name Eusideroxylon is Latinised Greek, derived from Greek; sideros meaning iron, and xylon meaning wood, with the prefix eu- meaning good, true, and original; the name of the genus thus means "true iron wood".

Eusideroxylon zwageri is the only valid species; Potoxylon melagangai was formerly placed in this genus as Eusideroxylon melagangai, though some sources retain it in Eusideroxylon.

Embryological studies suggest Eusideroxylon clades together with the Cryptocaryeae.

== Description ==
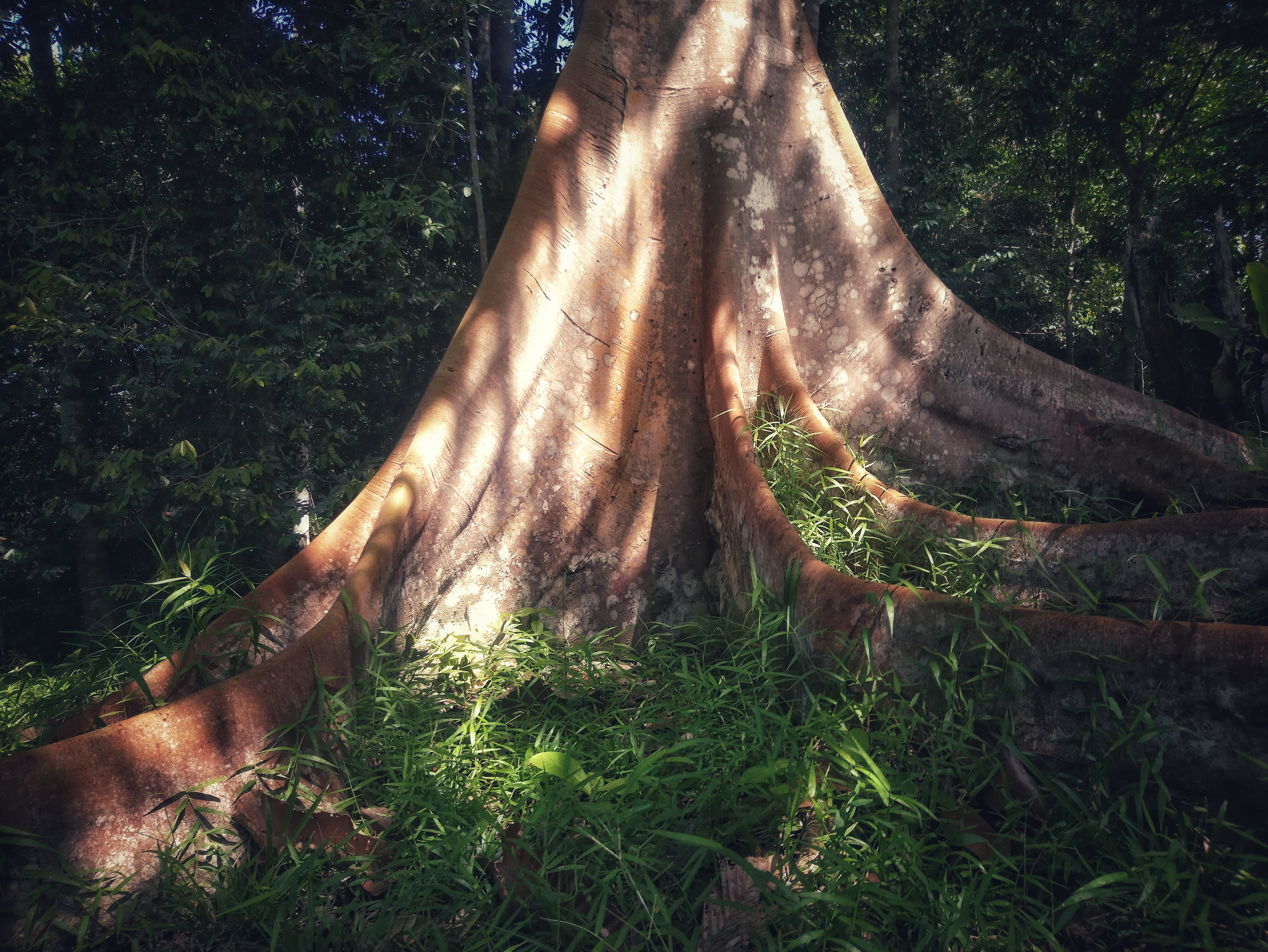
This species has buttress-like roots

Eusideroxylon zwageri is a canopy tree species with erect or spreading branches and extremely durable and decay-resistant wood. They are slow growing (0.5 m (1 ft 8 in) per year) tall evergreen trees with a straight bole (usually host to Cassytha, a parasitic vine with leaves reduced to scales, up to half of the tree's height). It is slightly fluted at the base, up to 150 to 220 cm (59 to 87 in) in diameter. The trunk has many small, rounded "buttresses" that give the base an almost elephant-foot like appearance.

Common commercially exploitable trees attain a height of around 30 m (98 ft), with trunk diameters of exploitable trees up to 92 cm (36 in). Protected trees are towering giants of the forest attaining a height of up to 50 m (160 ft) and a diameter of 220 cm – though height is routinely reduced by lightning strikes. An Ulin tree discovered in 1993 in Kutai National Park is one of the largest plants in Indonesia. It is an estimated 1,000 years old, and has increased its diameter from 241 to 247 cm (95 to 97 in) in the 20 years since its discovery. Its height was however reduced from about 30 m (98 ft) to only 20 m (66 ft) after a lightning strike. Another at Sangkimah in the west of the park has a diameter of 225 cm (89 in) and a height of some 45 m (148 ft). Odoardo Beccari reported a specimen with a girth of 10 metres.

The leaves are dark green, simple, leathery, and elliptical to ovate. They are 14–18 cm (6–7 in) long and 5–11 cm (2–4 in) wide, and grow along the stem alternately, rarely whorled or opposite, without stipules and petiolate. The leaf blade is entire (unlobed or lobed in Sassafras) and occasionally with domatia (crevices or hollows serving as lodging for mites) in axils of main lateral veins (present in Cinnamomum). Young leaves are reddish brown to yellowish red. They have a generous layer of wax, making them glossy in appearance, and are narrow, pointed oval in shape with an apical mucro, or 'drip tip', which enables the leaves to shed excess water in a humid environment.

The flowers are pale yellow to yellow. The flower is hermaphrodite, actinomorphic, with 6 tepals, distributed in two whorls that overlap. There are six staminodes, three stamens, and a simple pistil that consists of one carpel. Pollination is done by bees and other insects. The fruits are drupes, varying in size and shape from oblong to ovate or sub-cylindrical to asymmetric elongated or rounded. They are 8–13 cm (3.1–5.1 in) long, 4–5 cm (1.6–2.0 in) in diameter, and weigh 90–170 g (3.2–6.0 oz).

Based on morphology, four varieties (var.) are recognized, being exilis, ovoidus, grandis, and zwageri.

Generation length is thought to be around 100 years, and carbon dating of timber segments collected from 15 logged stumps in Kubah National Park, Sarawak, Malaysia, found that E. zwageri can live more than 1000 years. Growth rate of this species is very slow, with a mean radial growth rate of 0.058 cm per year. The cutting of old trees of E. zwageri results in the species being replaced by faster growing species. The long life span and reduced growth rate of this species may be a result of its dense and durable wood containing abundant defensive compounds.

Genetic variability is relatively high in Indonesia, and populations that are geographically close may be more distant genetically. A number of populations from Kalimantan exhibit evidence of inbreeding.

== Ecology ==
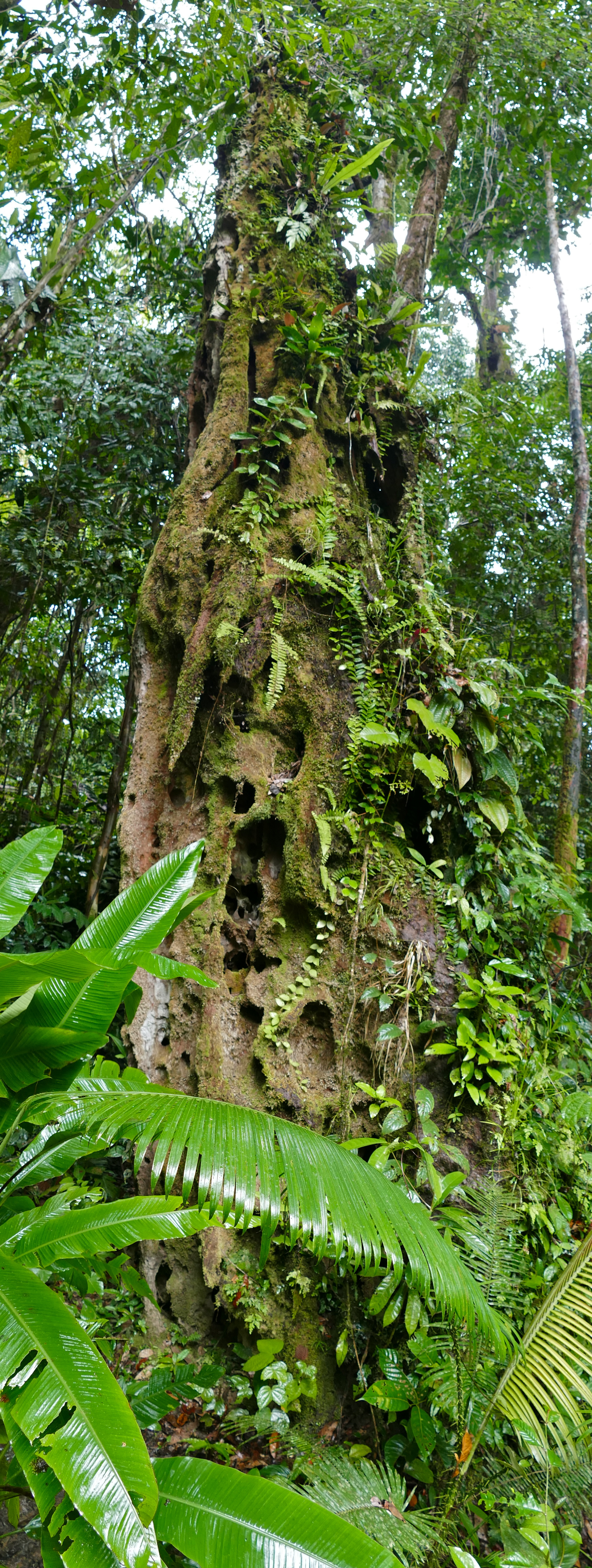
Dead Eusideroxylon covered in epiphytes

Eusideroxylon zwageri seedlings require some shade, while older trees need plenty of light. It can be found in valleys and on hillsides and even on low ridges when soil moisture is sufficient, throughout elevations between sea level and 650 m (2,130 ft). It may be found in secondary forests and a variety of soil types. The species is fire resistant, and is used for nesting by orangutans, hornbills, and raptors. The Malayan sun bear (Helarctos malayanus malayanus) is known to "shatter" the trunks of this species; generally, sun bears damage standing tree trunks in the pursuit of honey (of Apis dorsata, A. cerana indica, and Meliponini).

Seed dispersal is accomplished by primates and rodents, for which the fruits are an important food source. Long-tailed porcupines may cache the seeds of this species; abandoned caches may allow the seeds to germinate. Megafauna such as the Bornean rhino and various extinct species may have dispersed them as well. The seeds may drift out to sea and have been found on offshore islands such as Maratua.

== Relation to humans ==
The species is considered unsuitable for large-scale plantations due to slow growth and inadequate seed and seedling supply. Manual selection of trees in natural forests is common. The standing timber volume of trees with a diameter of over 50 cm (20 in) may be as much as 90–112 m^{3} (3,200–4,000 cu ft).

=== Properties ===
The wood is dense, and texture is moderately fine to fine and even. Also attractive to users is the resistance to insects, bacteria, fungi and marine borers. The wood has antibacterial properties (for local medicinal use).

The heartwood, when cut, is coloured light brown to almost bright yellow. During the aging process the heartwood darkens to a deep reddish brown, very dark brown, or near black. The sapwood is bright yellow when cut, and darkens slightly. The wood texture is fine and even, with a straight grain or only slightly interlocked. The timber retains a pleasant lemon odour; this odour, along with the wood's natural high lustre, makes it prized by cabinet-makers and fine furniture craftsmen.

Vessels are diffuse-porous, medium-sized, and generally evenly distributed, arranged in short radial rows (2–3 vessels). Moderate abundance of aliform paratracheal parenchyma. Growth rings' boundaries are indistinct or absent. Tyloses are often present. The wood has a radial shrinkage rate of 2–4.5% and a tangential shrinkage rate of 4.5–7.5%. The timber dries slowly, and care is needed to avoid checks and splits.

The heartwood is rated as very durable and immune to termite attack; a service life of up to 100 years in direct soil contact, and more than 20 years for marine work in tropical waters has been reported.

The wood is famed for its easy working characteristics, despite high density. The wood planes, bores and turns cleanly, producing smooth and often lustrous surfaces. Nailing requires pre-bores prior to nailing. Saw blades and other cutting instruments are moderately blunted during working the timber. The wood is apparently difficult to glue with synthetic resins.

=== Usage ===
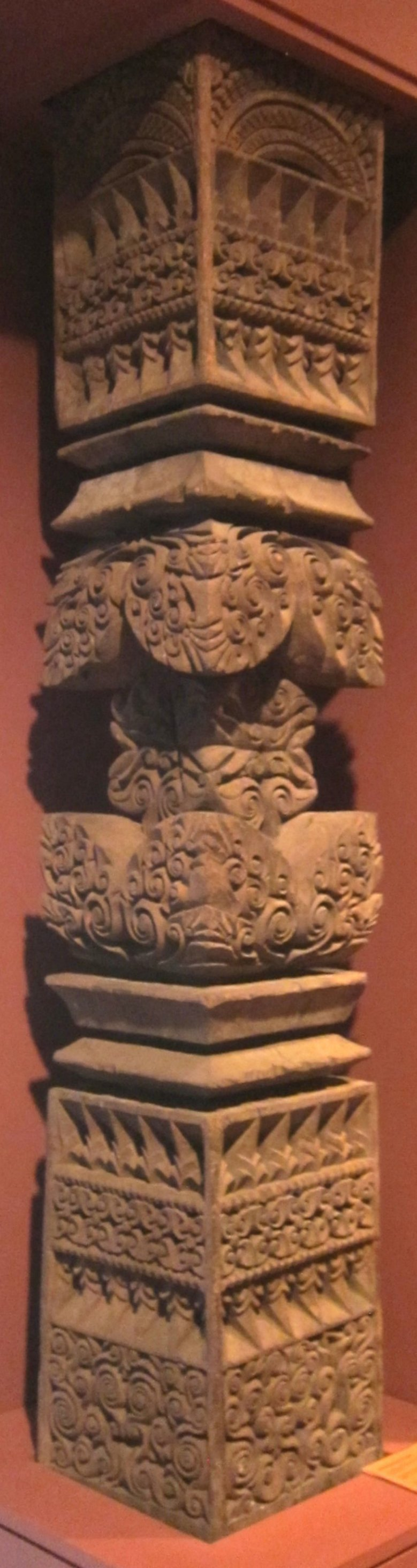
Post carved from ironwood, from Northern Lampung

Due to the excellent resistance to bacterial, fungal, insect, and marine borer attack, the wood is highly prized for many outdoor uses, especially as decking. Additionally, the wood's high density and easy workability lend it particular desirability in maritime structures, dock construction, and ship building, especially Indonesia's pinisi sail-boat. Common local uses include house construction, door construction, water butts and troughs, boat building (such as for pinisi), tools, tool handles, talisman, jewellery, medicinal slivers (for wounds, cuts, abrasions, bites and tooth-ache/infection), bridges, blowpipes and spear shafts, shingles, and flooring. The tree is important to the Dayak and Berwan peoples, and is assigned by them mystical powers, such as protection against large animals.

Internationally, it is renowned for heavy construction such as a buffer between transportation trailers and heavy steel fabrications (such as boilers, pressure vessels, reactors and many others). It is also frequently found in dry docks as a timber to separate the hull of ships from the steel supporting stands. It is also frequently used in boats and ships, industrial flooring, roofing (as shingles), fine indoor and outdoor furniture, coffin wood (esteemed by Chinese due to ability to withstand rot and insect attack), and tool handles — especially those exposed to continual high impact (the wood does not splinter and thus injure hands, eyes, nor endanger the operator on catastrophic failure) such as shovels, axes, block splitters, sledge hammers, heavy mallets, demolition hammers, mattocks, picks, hoes, and other types of hammer. Some expert cabinet-makers treasure an ulin-headed carpenter's mallet as an excellent intermediate density hammer face between the usual wood and a metal one and is able to quite easily tap or "whack" stubborn, highly polished metal fixtures without damage to the face or the fixture.

Other sources indicate that ulin wood is often used for marine constructions such as pilings, wharfs, docks, sluices, dams, ships, and bridges, but also used for power line poles, masts, roof shingles, and house posts, and, to a minor extent, as framing, board, heavy duty flooring, railway sleepers, fencing material, furniture, and likely more.

Ironwood extract (essential oils) may be a promising source of antioxidants and termite control substances. Flavonoids have also been extracted from this species.

=== Conservation ===
The government of Indonesia and the state government of Sarawak have formally banned the export of this species; however, illegal logging and smuggling continue to be a major problem. Population decline is estimated to be around 30% over the last 300 years.

Conservation efforts are underway, with several countries banning imports.
