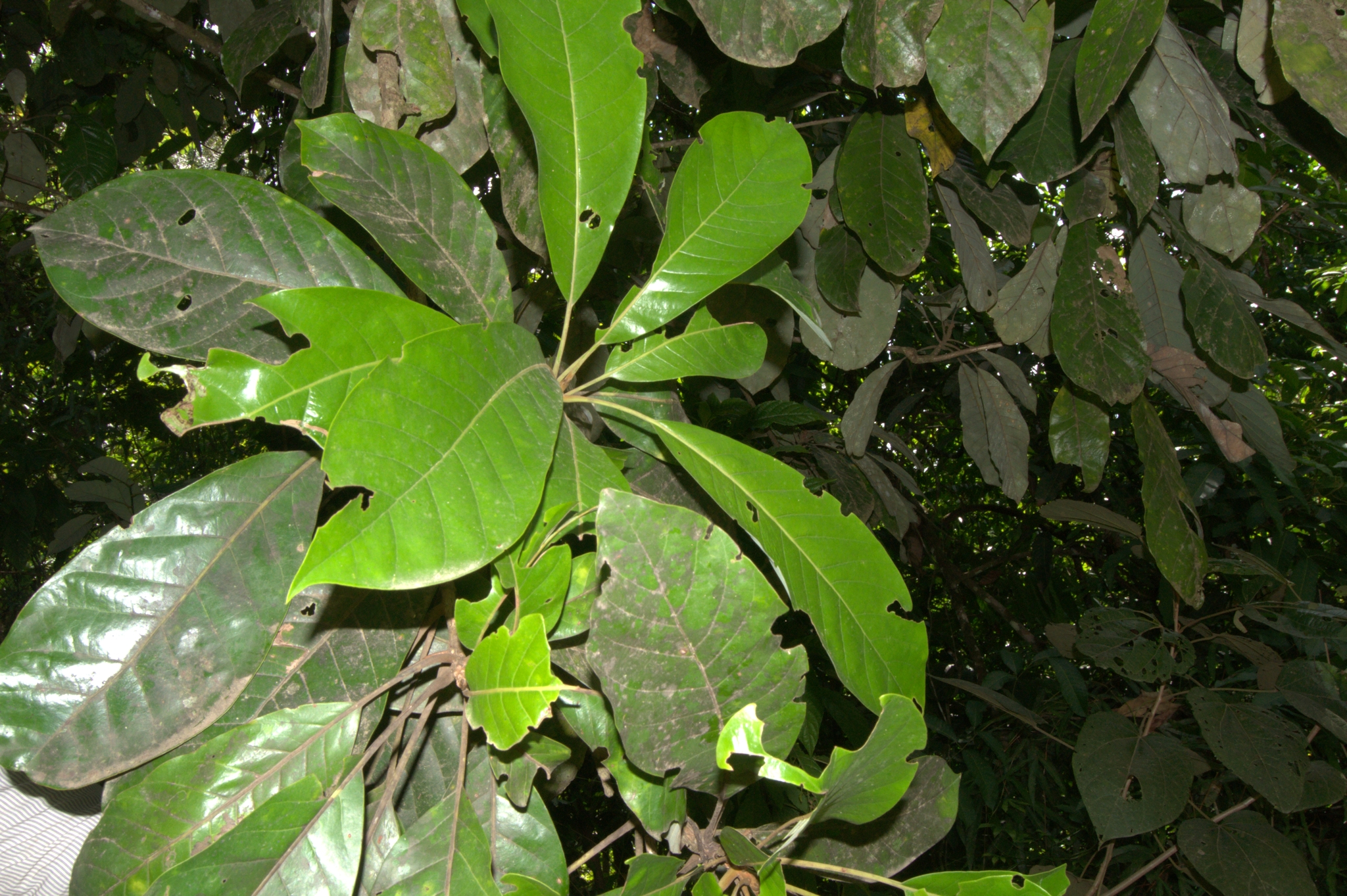
- Williamodendron glaucophyllum

Scientific classification
- Kingdom: Plantae
- Clade: Tracheophytes
- Clade: Angiosperms
- Clade: Magnoliids
- Order: Laurales
- Family: Lauraceae
- Genus: Williamodendron; Kubitzki & H.G.Richt.

= Williamodendron =

Genus of trees

Williamodendron is a genus of evergreen trees belonging to the Laurel family, Lauraceae, in South America.

== Description ==
Fruit is globose and subtended by the small persistent tepals, which form a collar at the base of the fruit. The floral characters and the wood and bark anatomy indicate a close relationship between Williamodendron and Mezilaurus.

== Species ==
Five species are accepted.

- Williamodendron cinnamomeum van der Werff
- Williamodendron glaucophyllum (van der Werff) Kubitzki & H.G.Richt.
- Williamodendron itamarajuense P.L.R.Moraes
- Williamodendron quadrilocellatum (van der Werff) Kubitzki & H.G. Richt.
- Williamodendron spectabile Kubitzki & H.G.Richt.
