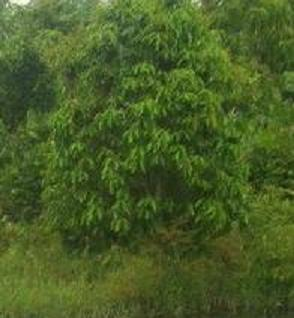

Scientific classification
- Kingdom: Plantae
- Clade: Tracheophytes
- Clade: Angiosperms
- Clade: Magnoliids
- Order: Laurales
- Family: Lauraceae
- Genus: Caryodaphnopsis; Airy Shaw

Species
- See text.

= Caryodaphnopsis =

Genus of flowering plants

Caryodaphnopsis is a genus of 23 species belonging to the flowering plant family Lauraceae, distributed in tropical areas in southern North America, northern South America, and East and Southeast Asia.

They vary from 50 m high trees to small trees or shrubs in lowland evergreen forest and rainforest.

The genus is distributed across the Pacific, with a marked geographical disjunction between Southeast Asia (South China, Vietnam, Laos, Cambodia, Indonesia, and the Philippines) and tropical America (Costa Rica to Brazil, crossing Peru, Ecuador, Colombia, and Venezuela).

== Taxonomic history ==
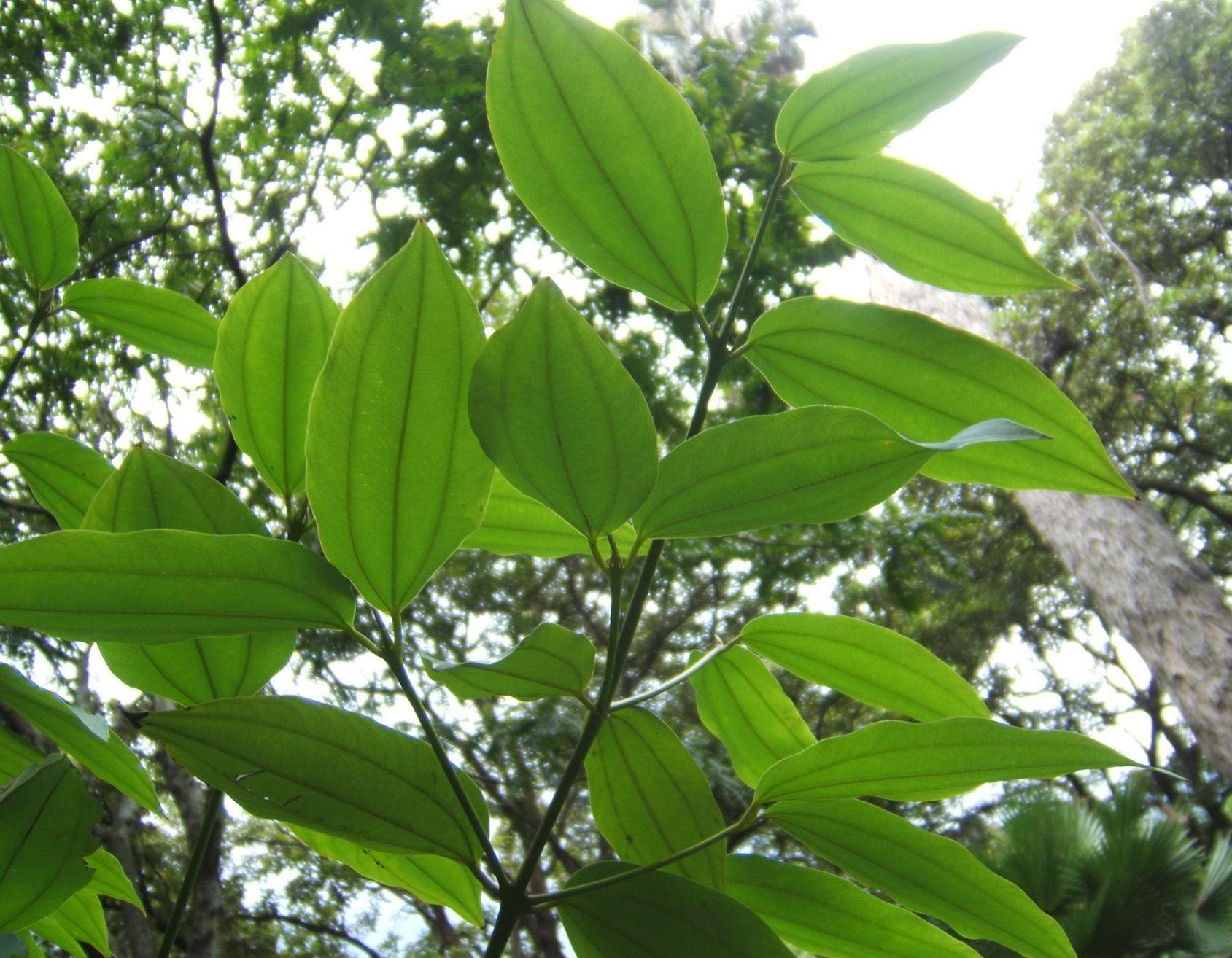
Caryodaphnopsis burgeri leaves

Until 1985, the genus was only reported for tropical Asia, but van der Werff and Richter transferred two South American species of the genus Persea to Caryodaphnopsis.

== Species ==
As of September 2026, Plants of the World Online accepts the following 23 species:

- Caryodaphnopsis baviensis (Lecomte) Airy Shaw
- Caryodaphnopsis bilocellata van der Werff & Dao
- Caryodaphnopsis burgeri N.Zamora & Poveda
- Caryodaphnopsis cangyuanensis Bing Liu, Y.Yang, Qiang Zhang bis & T.T.Sun
- Caryodaphnopsis carmensis Humberto Mend., J.D.Quiroga & Díaz-Rueda
- Caryodaphnopsis cogolloi van der Werff
- Caryodaphnopsis fieldii Aymard & G.A.Romero
- Caryodaphnopsis fosteri van der Werff
- Caryodaphnopsis hekouensis Bing Liu, Y.Yang, Qiang Zhang bis & T.T.Sun
- Caryodaphnopsis henryi Airy Shaw
- Caryodaphnopsis inaequalis (A.C.Sm.) van der Werff & H.G.Richt.
- Caryodaphnopsis laotica Airy Shaw
- Caryodaphnopsis latifolia W.T.Wang
- Caryodaphnopsis malipoensis Bing Liu & Y.Yang
- Caryodaphnopsis metallica Kosterm.
- Caryodaphnopsis parviflora van der Werff
- Caryodaphnopsis poilanei Kosterm.
- Caryodaphnopsis quanbaensis van der Werff & Dao
- Caryodaphnopsis rubrinervis Bing Liu, Y.Yang, Qiang Zhang bis & T.T.Sun
- Caryodaphnopsis theobromifolia (A.H.Gentry) van der Werff & H.G. Richt.
- Caryodaphnopsis tomentosa van der Werff
- Caryodaphnopsis tonkinensis (Lecomte) Airy Shaw
- Caryodaphnopsis yariguiensis Humberto Mend., Díaz-Rueda & Aymard
