= Pleurothyrium =

Scientific classification
- Kingdom: Plantae
- Clade: Tracheophytes
- Clade: Angiosperms
- Clade: Magnoliids
- Order: Laurales
- Family: Lauraceae
- Genus: Pleurothyrium; Nees

Genus of flowering plants

Pleurothyrium is a genus of flowering plants in the family Lauraceae. It includes 48 species, which are native to Central America and northern South America. Many of the species were first described in a 1993 revision of the genus.

== Species ==
48 species are currently accepted:

- Pleurothyrium acuminatum van der Werff
- Pleurothyrium amapaense C.K.Allen
- Pleurothyrium amplifolium (Mez) Rohwer
- Pleurothyrium arcuatum van der Werff
- Pleurothyrium bifidum Nees
- Pleurothyrium bilocellatum van der Werff
- Pleurothyrium bracteatum van der Werff
- Pleurothyrium brochidodromum van der Werff
- Pleurothyrium chrysothyrsus Meisn.
- Pleurothyrium cinereum van der Werff
- Pleurothyrium cordatum van der Werff
- Pleurothyrium costanense van der Werff
- Pleurothyrium crassitepalum van der Werff
- Pleurothyrium cuneifolium Nees
- Pleurothyrium giganthum van der Werff
- Pleurothyrium glabrifolium van der Werff
- Pleurothyrium glabritepalum van der Werff
- Pleurothyrium golfodulcense W.C.Burger & N.Zamora
- Pleurothyrium grandiflorum van der Werff
- Pleurothyrium guindonii van der Werff
- Pleurothyrium hexaglandulosum van der Werff
- Pleurothyrium immersum van der Werff
- Pleurothyrium insigne van der Werff
- Pleurothyrium intermedium (Mez) Rohwer
- Pleurothyrium marginale van der Werff
- Pleurothyrium maximum O.C.Schmidt
- Pleurothyrium oblongum van der Werff
- Pleurothyrium obovatum van der Werff
- Pleurothyrium obscurinerve van der Werff
- Pleurothyrium palmanum (Mez & Donn.Sm.) Rohwer
- Pleurothyrium panurense (Meisn.) Mez
- Pleurothyrium parviflorum Ducke
- Pleurothyrium pascoense van der Werff
- Pleurothyrium pauciflorum van der Werff & Hammel
- Pleurothyrium pilosum van der Werff
- Pleurothyrium poeppigii Nees
- Pleurothyrium prancei van der Werff
- Pleurothyrium racemosum van der Werff
- Pleurothyrium steyermarkianum C.K.Allen
- Pleurothyrium synandrum van der Werff
- Pleurothyrium tomentellum van der Werff
- Pleurothyrium tomiwahlii van der Werff
- Pleurothyrium trianae (Mez) Rohwer
- Pleurothyrium triflorum van der Werff
- Pleurothyrium undulatum (Meisn.) Rohwer
- Pleurothyrium vasquezii van der Werff
- Pleurothyrium westphaliae van der Werff
- Pleurothyrium williamsii O.C.Schmidt
