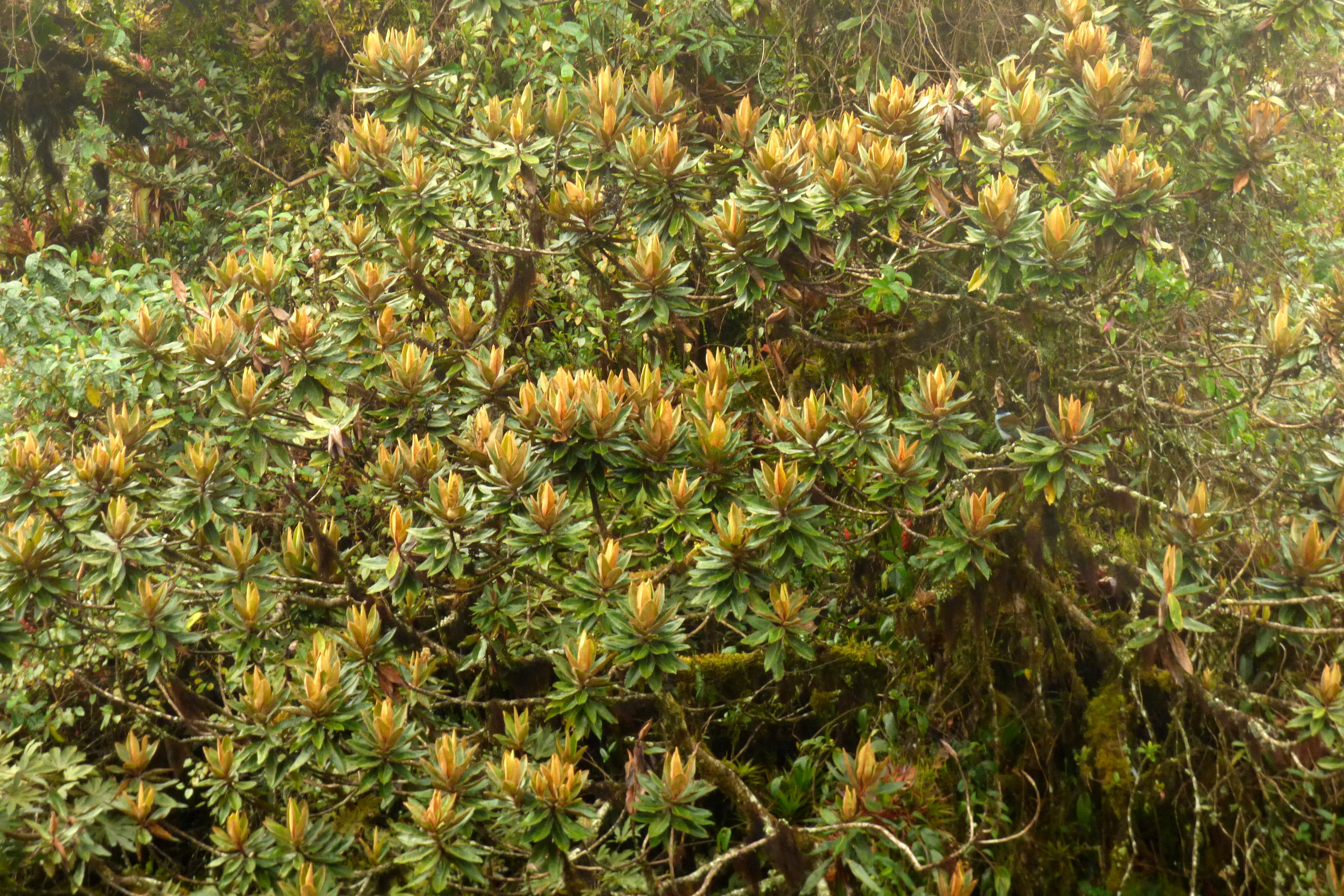
- Andea sericea in Armenia, Colombia

Scientific classification
- Kingdom: Plantae
- Clade: Tracheophytes
- Clade: Angiosperms
- Clade: Magnoliids
- Order: Laurales
- Family: Lauraceae
- Genus: Andea van der Werff

Species
- 26; see text

= Andea =

Genus of flowering plants

Andea is a genus of flowering plants in the family Lauraceae. It includes 26 species of trees and shrubs native to the tropical Americas, including Costa Rica, Colombia, Venezuela, Ecuador, and Peru. Most species grow in the northern Andes mountains, after which the genus is named, in tropical montane forests above 1000 meters elevation. One species (A. fulvescens) is native to the Cordillera de Talamanca of Costa Rica.

Plants in the genus are gynodioecious, with some individual plants bearing female flowers only while others bear bisexual (hermaphrodite) flowers. The species were formerly placed in genus Ocotea, and are distinguished from other gynodioecious Ocotea species by their thick terete twigs (generally 6 mm or more in diameter, and 4–7 mm in diameter in a few species), sessile or nearly sessile leaves without domatia, and large flowers (6 mm or more in diameter) with rotate tepals and (shallowly) bowl-shaped cupules.

== Species ==
As of September 2023, the follow 26 species are accepted by Plants of the World Online.

- Andea adusta (van der Werff) van der Werff
- Andea antioquiensis (van der Werff) van der Werff
- Andea argyrea (van der Werff) van der Werff
- Andea carchiensis (van der Werff) van der Werff
- Andea ceronii (van der Werff) van der Werff
- Andea crinita (van der Werff) van der Werff
- Andea ferruginea van der Werff
- Andea fulvescens (Standl. & L.O.Williams) van der Werff
- Andea homeieri (van der Werff) van der Werff
- Andea hueckii (Bernardi) van der Werff
- Andea infrafoveolata (van der Werff) van der Werff
- Andea kolera (van der Werff) van der Werff
- Andea lorda (van der Werff) van der Werff
- Andea micans (Mez) van der Werff
- Andea multinervis (van der Werff) van der Werff
- Andea nidiae (van der Werff) van der Werff
- Andea oreophila (van der Werff) van der Werff
- Andea otara (van der Werff) van der Werff
- Andea raymondiana (van der Werff) van der Werff
- Andea santamartae (van der Werff) van der Werff
- Andea sericea (Kunth) van der Werff
- Andea smithiana (O.C.Schmidt) van der Werff
- Andea sodiroana (Mez) van der Werff
- Andea subparamicola (van der Werff) van der Werff
- Andea tunquiensis (van der Werff) van der Werff
- Andea velutina (Meisn.) van der Werff
