= Triadodaphne =

Scientific classification
- Kingdom: Plantae
- Clade: Tracheophytes
- Clade: Angiosperms
- Clade: Magnoliids
- Order: Laurales
- Family: Lauraceae
- Genus: Triadodaphne; Kosterm.

Genus of flowering plants

Triadodaphne is a genus of flowering plants belonging to the family Lauraceae.

Its native range is Borneo and Papuasia.

Species:

- Triadodaphne inaequitepala (Kosterm.) Kosterm. – New Guinea
- Triadodaphne myristicoides Kosterm. – Borneo
- Triadodaphne pachytepala Kosterm. – Solomon Islands
