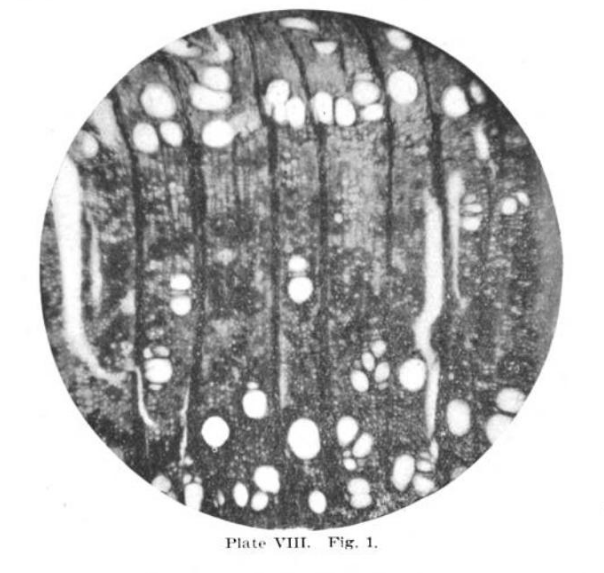

Scientific classification
- Kingdom: Plantae
- Clade: Tracheophytes
- Clade: Angiosperms
- Clade: Magnoliids
- Order: Laurales
- Family: Lauraceae
- Genus: †Ulminium; Unger

Type species
- †Ulminium diluviale Unger in Endl., 1842

Species
- See text

= Ulminium =

Ulminium Temporal range: Maastrichtian–Pliocene

Extinct genus of flowering plants

Ulminium is an extinct genus of flowering plants known from fossil wood.

== Species ==
Numerous species based on fossil woods have been placed into the genus since it was first described.

- †Ulminium columbianum (Penh.) Nagalhard, 1922
- †Ulminium diluviale Unger in Endl., 1842
- †Ulminium hungaricum (Lingelsh.) W.N.Edwards, 1931
- †Ulminium kleinii (Tuzson) W.N.Edwards, 1931
- †Ulminium lapidariorum (Unger in Endl.) W.N.Edwards, 1931
- †Ulminium lovisatoi (Falqui) W.N.Edwards, 1931
- †Ulminium mulleri V.M.Page, 1967
- †Ulminium parenchymatosum E.A.Wheeler, R.A.Scott, Bargh., 1977
- †Ulminium pattersonense V.M.Page, 1967
- †Ulminium pliocenicum Pampal., 1904
- †Ulminium protoamericanum (Penh.) Nagalhard, 1922
- †Ulminium protoracemosum (Penh.) Nagalhard, 1922
- †Ulminium simrothii (Platen) W.N.Edwards, 1931
- †Ulminium zelkowiforme Watari, 1941

A number of species have subsequently been moved from the genus:

- †Ulminium artabeae now Laurinoxylon artabeae
- †Ulminium atlanticum now Laurinoxylon atlanticum
- †Ulminium chubutense now Laurinoxylon chubutense
- †Ulminium elliottii now Laurinoxylon elliottii
- †Ulminium eocenicum now Laurinoxylon eocenicum
- †Ulminium kokubunii now Laurinoxylon kokubunii
- †Ulminium magnioleiferum now Laurinoxylon magnioleiferum
- †Ulminium mucilaginosum now Laurinoxylon mucilaginosum
- †Ulminium palibinii now Ulmoxylon palibinii
- †Ulminium porosum now Laurinoxylon porosum
- †Ulminium scalariforme now Paraperseoxylon scalariforme
- †Ulminium wakimizui now Ulmus wakimizui
- †Ulminium wheelerae now Laurinoxylon wheelerae

== Gallery of species ==
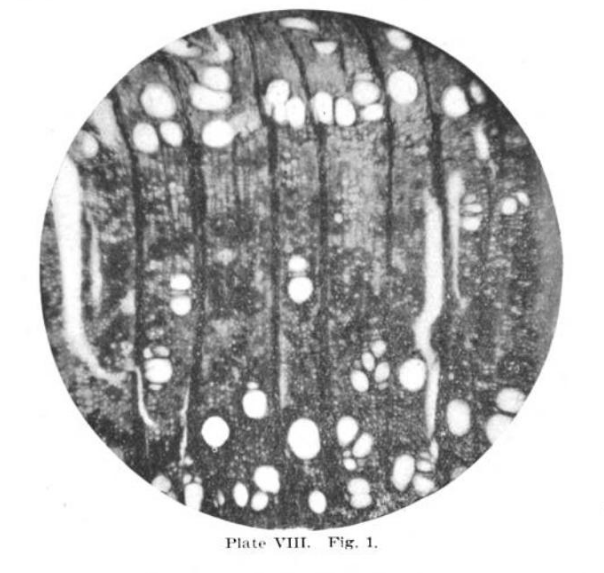
Ulminium columbianum

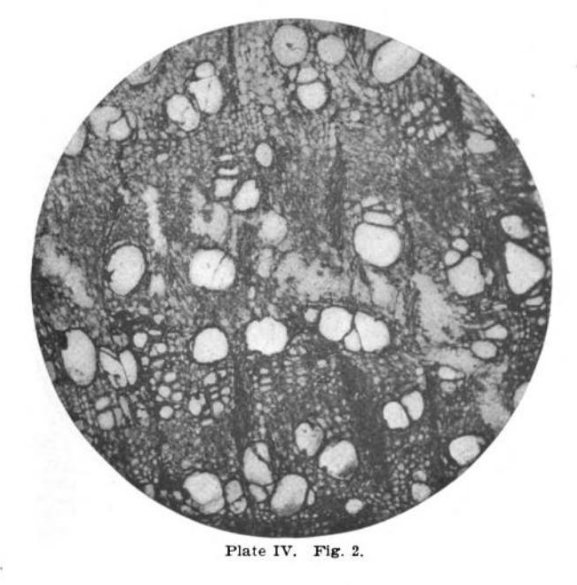
Ulmus (Ulminium) protoracemosa

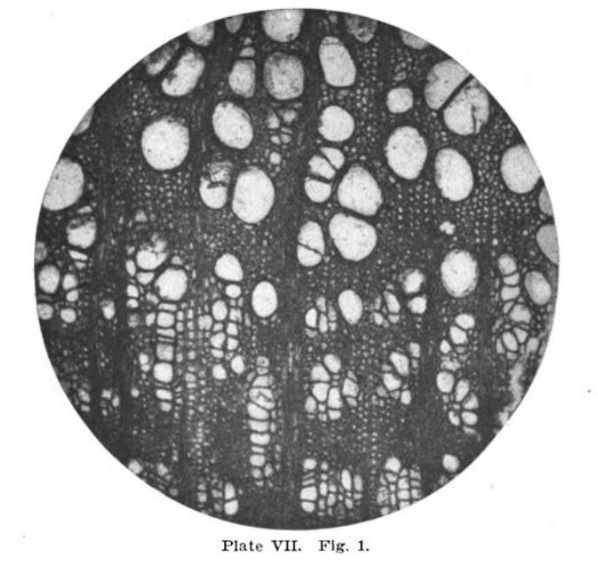
Ulmus (Ulminium) protoamericana
