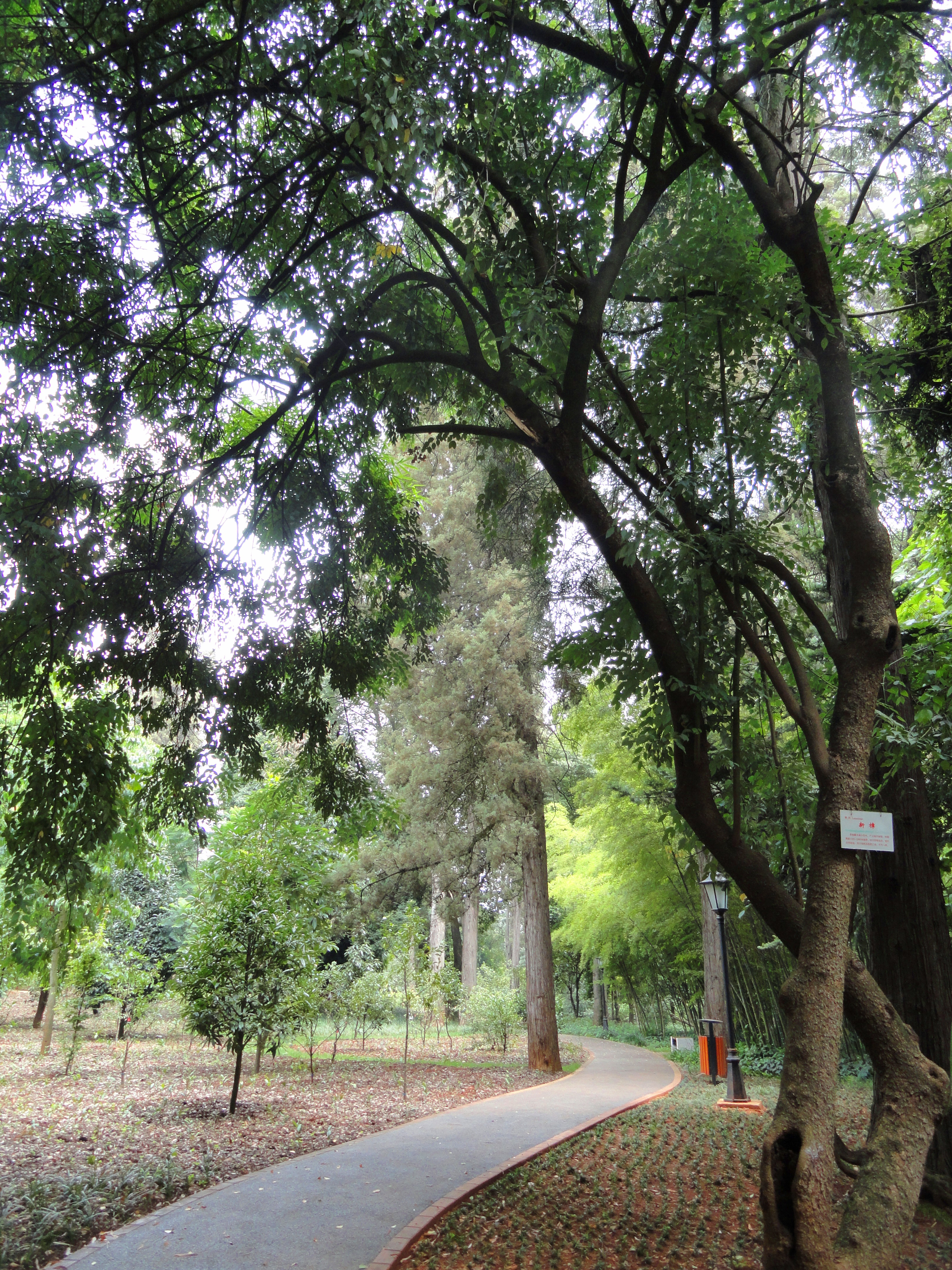
- Neocinnamomum delavayi

Scientific classification
- Kingdom: Plantae
- Clade: Tracheophytes
- Clade: Angiosperms
- Clade: Magnoliids
- Order: Laurales
- Family: Lauraceae
- Genus: Neocinnamomum; H.Liu

Species
- See text

= Neocinnamomum =

Genus of shrubs

Neocinnamomum (新樟属, xin zhang shu) is a genus of flowering plants belonging to the family Lauraceae. They are evergreen shrubs or small trees, indigenous to Bhutan, China, northeastern India, Indonesia (Sumatra), Myanmar, Nepal, Thailand, and Vietnam.

Neocinnamomum require a warm and wet climate with no extremes of heat and cold. They occupy mid to high elevations and montane laurel forests.

Neocinnamomum leaves resemble those of true cinnamon (Cinnamomum) in possessing strongly three-veined blades, but they are arranged alternately rather than oppositely. The flowers are very small and bisexual. The inflorescences are highly condensed, with poorly defined branching, their overall shape described as "glomerules". Pollination is by insects. The seeds are dispersed by birds, which eat the fruit which are berry-like drupes. The red fruits of N. caudatum are eaten by humans. The fruits are ellipsoid or globose (round). Some species also propagate vegetatively.

Neocinnamomum mekongense is a species that grows in the mountains north of Dali, China. It is popular with butterflies, which possibly are attracted by secretions from extrafloral nectaries.

It has been suggested that fossil flowers from the late Cretaceous of North America known as Neusenia tetrasporangi are a close match to Neocinnamomum, and phylogenetic analysis from living plants might also indicate that Neocinnamomum is one of the earliest surviving lineages of the Lauraceae.

== Species ==
Seven species are accepted.

- Neocinnamomum atjehense Kosterm.
- Neocinnamomum caudatum (Nees) Merrill
- Neocinnamomum delavayi (Lecomte) H.Liu
- Neocinnamomum fargesii (Lecomte) Kosterm.
- Neocinnamomum huongsonensis Dao ex de Kok
- Neocinnamomum lecomtei H.Liu
- Neocinnamomum mekongense (Hand.-Mazz.) Kosterm.
