= Mespilodaphne =

Scientific classification
- Kingdom: Plantae
- Clade: Tracheophytes
- Clade: Angiosperms
- Clade: Magnoliids
- Order: Laurales
- Family: Lauraceae
- Genus: Mespilodaphne; Nees

Species
- 9; see text

Synonyms
- Dendrodaphne Beurl.; Sassafridium Meisn.

Genus of flowering plants

Mespilodaphne is a genus of flowering plants in the family Lauraceae. It includes nine species native to the tropical Americas, ranging from Mexico through Central and northern South America to northern Brazil and Peru.

== Species ==
Nine species are accepted.

- Mespilodaphne cymbarum (Kunth) Trofimov
- Mespilodaphne fragrantissima (Ducke) Trofimov
- Mespilodaphne ligulata (van der Werff) van der Werff
- Mespilodaphne macrophylla (Beurl.) Trofimov
- Mespilodaphne morae (Gómez-Laur.) Trofimov
- Mespilodaphne paradoxa (Mez) Hammel
- Mespilodaphne quixos (Lam.) Rohwer
- Mespilodaphne staminea (Griseb.) Trofimov
- Mespilodaphne veraguensis (Meisn.) Rohwer
