= Hypodaphnis =

Conservation status
- Least Concern (IUCN 3.1)

Scientific classification
- Kingdom: Plantae
- Clade: Tracheophytes
- Clade: Angiosperms
- Clade: Magnoliids
- Order: Laurales
- Family: Lauraceae
- Genus: Hypodaphnis (Engl.) Stapf
- Species: H. zenkeri

Binomial name
- Hypodaphnis zenkeri (Engl.) Stapf

Synonyms
- Ocotea zenkeri Engl.

Genus of flowering plants

Hypodaphnis is a monotypic genus of flowering plants of the family Lauraceae. Its only extant species, Hypodaphnis zenkeri, is native to Gabon. Although only one living species is known, fossils of some species of this genus are present in North America, especially in Northern Mexico. In most phylogenetic analysis, Hypodaphnis appears as the basal branch, the sister group of the rest of the family Lauraceae.

== Description ==
Some trees are reaching 6-10 (-20) m high and 60 cm trunk diameter. The small tree up to 15(–20) m tall, is a stoloniferous, aromatic shrub or little tree, in the laurel family. The trees are having vesicular-arbuscular mycorrhizae. The bole often is twisted, up to 60 cm in diameter; bark surface dark grey or blackish brown, usually smooth, but sometimes rough and scaly. it has a fibrous pale cream-colored inner bark.

It has a crown bushy, dark green. The branches are reddish, hairy when young becoming glabrous when older. Leaves alternate, simple and entire; stipules absent; petiole up to 5 cm long; blade elliptical to obovate, 12–30 cm × 6–15 cm, base shortly cuneate, apex acuminate, papery, upper surface slightly shiny, green, lower surface dull, paler green, pinnately veined with 4–6 pairs of lateral veins. The Inflorescence are axillary, umbel-like panicle 3–8 cm long, reddish hairy, many-flowered; bracts caducous. Flowers bisexual, characterized by having the ovary in an inferior position. The flower is regular, yellowish, orange, yellow to orange or brown. It has a red furry (reddish hairy), cup-shaped perianth 4 mm long, with 6 lobes; stamens in 3 whorls, with basal glands, staminodes are absent. The fruit is an ovoid drupe up to 6 cm × 5 cm, bright red. The drupe is single-seeded. Seed 3–3.5 cm long. In Gabon the tree flowering from March to April and fruiting in August. In Nigeria flowers from February to July, and fruits from May to November.
