= Sinopora (plant) =

Scientific classification
- Kingdom: Plantae
- Clade: Tracheophytes
- Clade: Angiosperms
- Clade: Magnoliids
- Order: Laurales
- Family: Lauraceae
- Genus: Sinopora; J.Li, N.H.Xia & H.W.Li
- Species: S. hongkongensis

Binomial name
- Sinopora hongkongensis (N.H.Xia, Y.F.Deng & K.L.Yip) J.Li, N.H.Xia & H.W.Li

Synonyms
- Syndiclis hongkongensis N.H.Xia, Y.F.Deng & K.L.Yip

Genus of plants

Sinopora is a monotypic genus of flowering plants belonging to the family Lauraceae. It contains a single species, Sinopora hongkongensis, a tree native to southeastern China.

Its native range is Southeastern China. The species is classified under the IUCN Red List Assessment criteria as Critically Endangered B1þ2ab,C2a(i),D with only a few individuals known to occur. Although the habitat in which the last remaining individuals are found is under protective legislation and close monitoring, the species is balancing on the brink of extinction. The complete chloroplast genome of Sinopora hongkongensis was published in 2021.
