= Propenylphenol =

Propenylphenols broadly are compounds containing a propenyl group bonded to a phenol ring. These include many phenylpropanoids, where there are typically other substituents bonded to the aromatic ring. Propenylphenol specifically may refer to the following isomers of C_{9}H_{10}O (molar mass 134.17 g/mol):

- Anol (4-propenylphenol)
- Chavicol (4-(2-propenyl)phenol)
