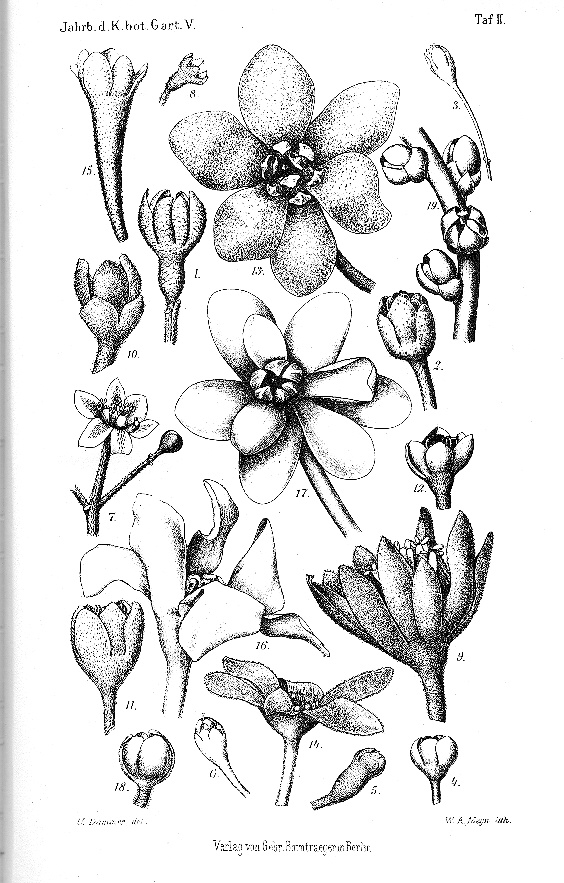
- Illustration 17: Dicypellium caryophyllatum

Scientific classification
- Kingdom: Plantae
- Clade: Tracheophytes
- Clade: Angiosperms
- Clade: Magnoliids
- Order: Laurales
- Family: Lauraceae
- Genus: Dicypellium; Nees & Mart.

Species
- Dicypellium anisum F.M.Alves & Zappi; Dicypellium caryophyllatum (Mart.) Nees; Dicypellium manausense W.A.Rodrigues

= Dicypellium =

Genus of flowering plants

Dicypellium is a genus of three species of flowering plants in the family Lauraceae, native to tropical South America, in Amazon Basin.

Diagnostic characters: they are trees, with the flowers not involucrated, ovary superior, nine or fewer fertile stamens, anthers four-locular and nine tepals, and the fruit with cupules (see illustration).

Dicypellium caryophyllatum, known as "pau-cravo" in Brazil, has bark that smells like cloves.
