= Urbanodendron =

Scientific classification
- Kingdom: Plantae
- Clade: Embryophytes
- Clade: Tracheophytes
- Clade: Spermatophytes
- Clade: Angiosperms
- Clade: Magnoliids
- Order: Laurales
- Family: Lauraceae
- Genus: Urbanodendron; Mez

Genus of flowering plants

Urbanodendron is a genus of flowering plants in the family Lauraceae. The three species are native to Brazil.

Little information is available about the genus because the species are rare and endangered.

These are evergreen monoecious trees with alternately arranged leaves. The flowers have six tepals and nine stamens.

These are endemic species of the Brazilian tropical seasonal semi-deciduous montane forests, the cloud forest. In 1978, after five centuries of occupation and the effects of various economic cycles, the Brazilian Atlantic Forest, has been reduced to about only 7.6% of its original extension, in a drastic deforestation.

== Species ==
There are three species:

- Urbanodendron bahiense (Meisn.) Rohwer
- Urbanodendron macrophyllum Rohwer
- Urbanodendron verrucosum (Nees) Mez
