= Phyllostemonodaphne =

Conservation status
- Endangered (IUCN 2.3)

Scientific classification
- Kingdom: Plantae
- Clade: Tracheophytes
- Clade: Angiosperms
- Clade: Magnoliids
- Order: Laurales
- Family: Lauraceae
- Genus: Phyllostemonodaphne; Kosterm.
- Species: P. geminiflora

Binomial name
- Phyllostemonodaphne geminiflora (Desv. ex Ham.) Kosterm.

Synonyms
- Systemonodaphne Mez; Acrodiclidium geminiflorum (Desv. ex Ham.) Mez; Goeppertia geminiflora (Desv. ex Ham.) Meisn.; Laurus geminiflora Desv. ex Ham.; Systemonodaphne geminiflora (Desv. ex Ham.) Mez

Genus of flowering plants

Phyllostemonodaphne is a monotypic genus of flowering plants in the family Lauraceae containing the single species Phyllostemonodaphne geminiflora. It is endemic to Brazil, where it is known from Espírito Santo, Minas Gerais, and the state of Rio de Janeiro. Most collections have been made near the city of Rio de Janeiro.
