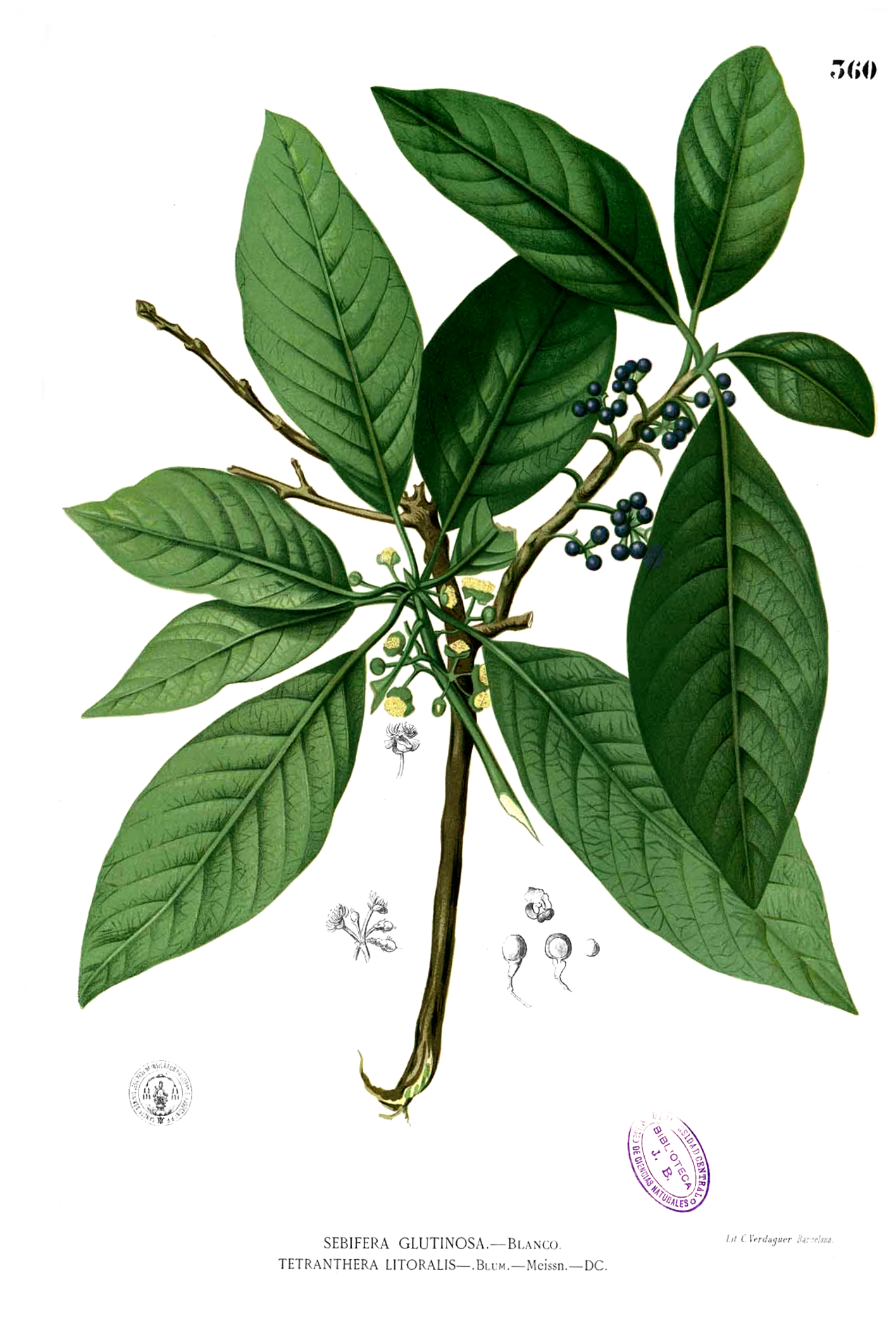
- Litsea glutinosa illustration from Flora de Filipinas, 1880–1883, by Francisco Manuel Blanco

Scientific classification
- Kingdom: Plantae
- Clade: Tracheophytes
- Clade: Angiosperms
- Clade: Magnoliids
- Order: Laurales
- Family: Lauraceae; Juss.

Genera
- Many; see § Genera

= Lauraceae =

Lauraceae Temporal range: Cretaceous-Recent (Cenomanian-Holocene), 100–0 Ma Possible Albian record

Family of flowering plants

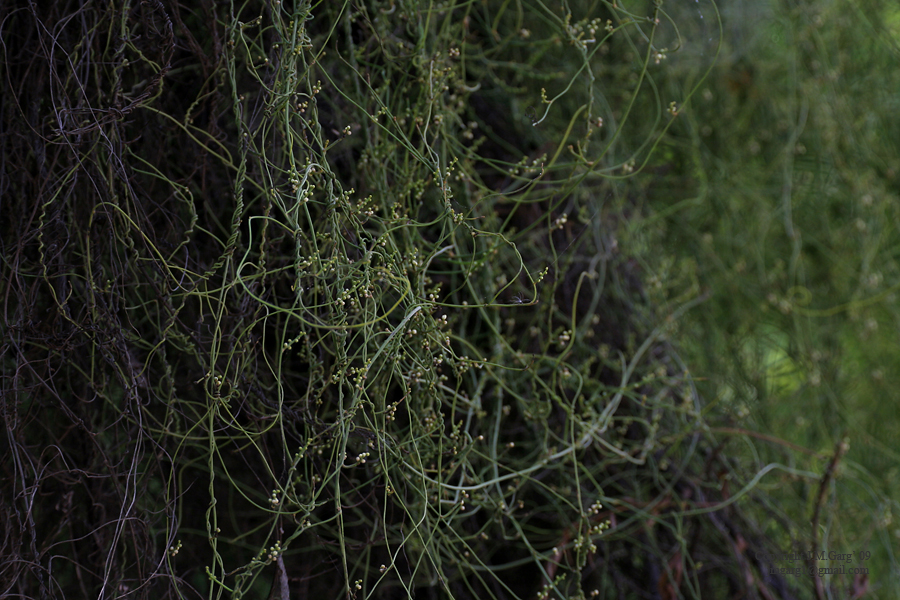
Cassytha filiformis

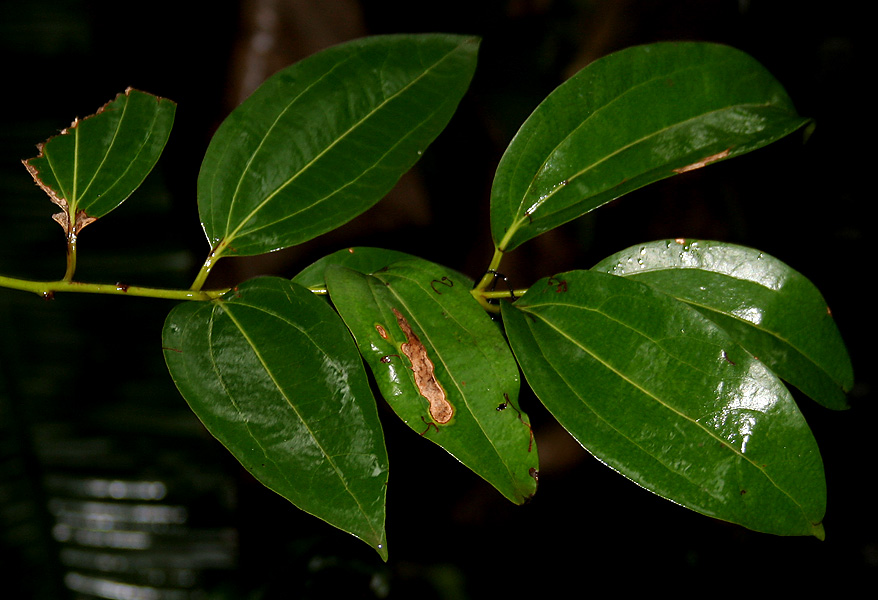
Leaves of Cinnamomum tamala - (malabathrum or tejpat)

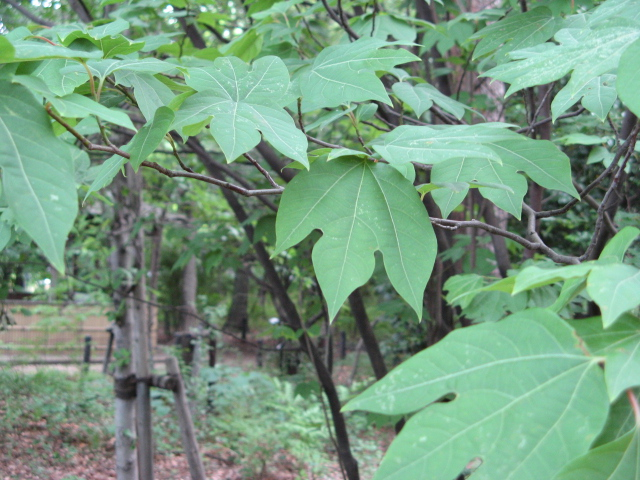
Lindera triloba leaves

Lauraceae, or the laurels, is a plant family that includes the true laurel and its closest relatives. This family comprises about 2850 known species in about 45 genera worldwide. They are dicotyledons, and occur mainly in warm temperate and tropical regions, especially Southeast Asia and South America. Many are aromatic evergreen trees or shrubs, but some, such as Sassafras, are deciduous, or include both deciduous and evergreen trees and shrubs, especially in tropical and temperate climates. The genus Cassytha is unique in the Lauraceae in that its members are parasitic vines. Many species within the laurel family are highly toxic; however, some, such as the avocado (Persea americana), are edible and widely consumed. Members of the laurel family have played a significant role in the spice trade, particularly genera like Cinnamomum, which produce aromatic oils used extensively in cooking, perfumery, and traditional medicine.

== Overview ==
The family has a worldwide distribution in tropical and warm climates. The Lauraceae are important components of tropical forests ranging from low-lying to montane. In several forested regions, Lauraceae are among the top five families in terms of the number of species present.

The Lauraceae give their name to habitats known as laurel forests, which have many trees that superficially resemble the Lauraceae, though they may belong to other plant families such as Magnoliaceae or Myrtaceae. Laurel forests of various types occur on most continents and on many major islands.

Although the taxonomy of the Lauraceae is still not settled, conservative estimates suggest some 52 genera worldwide, including 3,000 to 3,500 species. Compared to other plant families, the taxonomy of Lauraceae still is poorly understood. This is partly due to its great diversity, the difficulty of identifying the species, and partly because of inadequate investment in taxonomic work.

Recent monographs on small and medium-sized genera of Lauraceae (up to about 100 species) have revealed many new species. Similar increases in the numbers of species recognised in other larger genera are to be expected.

Laurels are common in the fossil record and have been widespread since the Cretaceous.

== Description ==
Most of the Lauraceae are evergreen or deciduous trees in habit. Exceptions include some two dozen species of Cassytha, all of which are obligately parasitic vines.

The fruits of Lauraceae are drupes, one-seeded fleshy fruit with a hard layer, the endocarp, surrounding the seed. However, the endocarp is very thin, so the fruit resemble a one-seeded berry. The fruit in some species (particularly in the genus Ocotea) are partly immersed or covered in a cup-shaped or deep thick cupule, which is formed from the tube of the calyx where the peduncle joins the fruit; this gives the fruit an appearance similar to an acorn. In some Lindera species, the fruit have a hypocarpium at the base of the fruit.

== Distribution and uses ==
Lauraceae is an ancient lineage of flowering plants, but its present-day distribution reflects a combination of historical biogeography and later dispersal; although it was once interpreted as a classic Gondwanan pattern, subsequent work has suggested that some distribution patterns are more recent in origin. Relict forests retain endemic fauna and flora in communities of great value in inferring the palaeontological succession and climate change that followed the breakups of the supercontinents.

- Many Lauraceae contain high concentrations of essential oils, some of which are valued for spices and perfumes. Within the plants, most such substances are components of irritant or toxic sap or tissues that repel or poison many herbivorous or parasitic organisms.
- Some of the essential oils are valued as fragrances, such as in the traditional laurel wreath of classical antiquity, or in cabinet making, where the fragrant woods are prized for making insect-repellant furniture chests.
- Some are valued in cooking, for example, bay leaves are a popular ingredient in European, American, and Asian cuisines.
- Avocados are important oil-rich fruit that are cultivated in warm climates around the world.
- Many species are exploited for timber.
- Some species are valued as sources of medicinal material.

These genera include some of the best-known species of particular commercial value:

- Cinnamomum: cinnamon (Cinnamonum verum) and cassia (Cinnamomum cassia)
- Camphora: camphor tree (Camphora officinarum)
- Laurus: bay laurel (Laurus nobilis)
- Persea: avocado (Persea americana)

Loss of habitat and overexploitation for such products has put many species in danger of extinction as a result of overcutting, extensive illegal logging, and habitat conversion.

Conversely, some species, though commercially valuable in some countries, are regarded as aggressive invaders in other regions. For example, Cinnamomum camphora, though a valued ornamental and medicinal plant, is so invasive as to have been declared a weed in subtropical forested areas of South Africa.

== Ecology ==
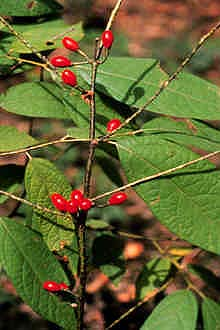
Lindera melissifolia: This endangered species is native to the southeastern United States, and its demise is associated with habitat loss from extensive drainage of wetlands for agriculture and forestry.

Lauraceae flowers are protogynous, often with a complex flowering system to prevent inbreeding. The fruits are an important food source for birds, on which some Palaeognathae are highly dependent. Other birds that rely heavily on the fruit for their diets include members of the families Cotingidae, Columbidae, Trogonidae, Turdidae, and Ramphastidae, amongst others. Birds that are specialised frugivores tend to eat the whole fruit and regurgitate seeds intact, thereby releasing the seeds in favourable situations for germination (ornithochory). Some other birds that swallow the fruit pass the seed intact through their guts.

Seed dispersal of various species in the family is also carried out by monkeys, arboreal rodents, porcupines, opossums, and fishes. Hydrochory occurs in Caryodaphnopsis.

The leaves of some species in the Lauraceae have domatia in the axils of their veins. The domatia are home to certain mites. Other lauraceous species, members of the genus Pleurothyrium in particular, have a symbiotic relationship with ants that protect and defend the tree. Some Ocotea species are also used as nesting sites by ants, which may live in leaf pockets or in hollowed-out stems.

Defense mechanisms that occur among members of the Lauraceae include irritant or toxic sap or tissues that repel or poison many herbivorous organisms.

Trees of the family predominate in the world's laurel forests and cloud forests, which occur in tropical to mild temperate regions of both northern and southern hemispheres. Other members of the family however, occur pantropically in general lowland and Afromontane forest, and in Africa for example there are species endemic to countries such as Cameroon, Sudan, Tanzania, Uganda and Congo. Several relict species in the Lauraceae occur in temperate areas of both hemispheres. Many botanical species in other families have similar foliage to the Lauraceae due to convergent evolution, and forests of such plants are called laurel forest. These plants are adapted to high rainfall and humidity, and have leaves with a generous layer of wax, making them glossy in appearance, and a narrow, pointed-oval shape with a 'drip tip', which permits the leaves to shed water despite the humidity, allowing transpiration to continue. Scientific names similar to Daphne (e.g., Daphnidium, Daphniphyllum) or "laurel" (e.g.,Laureliopsis, Skimmia laureola) indicate other plant families that resemble Lauraceae.

Some Lauraceae species have adapted to demanding conditions in semiarid climates, but they tend to depend on favorable edaphic conditions, for example, perennial aquifers, periodic groundwater flows, or periodically flooded forests in sand that contains hardly any nutrients. Various species have adapted to swampy conditions by growing pneumatophores, roots that grow upward, that project above the levels of periodic floods that drown competing plants which lack such adaptations.

Paleobotanists have suggested the family originated some 174±32 million years ago (Mya), while others do not believe they are older than the mid-Cretaceous. Fossil flowers attributed to this family occur in Cenomanian clays (mid-Cretaceous, 90–98 Mya) of the Eastern United States (Mauldinia mirabilis). Fossils of Lauraceae are common in the Tertiary strata of Europe and North America, but they virtually disappeared from central Europe in the Late Miocene. Because of their unusual fragility, the pollens of Lauraceae do not keep well and have been found only in relatively recent strata.

Deciduous members of the Lauraceae lose all of their leaves for part of the year depending on variations in rainfall. The leaf loss coincides with the dry season in tropical, subtropical, and arid regions.

Laurel wilt disease, caused by the virulent fungal pathogen Raffaelea lauricola, a native of southern Asia, was found in the southeast United States in 2002. The fungus spreads between hosts via a wood-boring beetle, Xyleborus glabratus, with which it has a symbiotic relationship. Several Lauraceae species are affected. The beetle and disease are believed to have arrived in the US via infected solid wood packing material and have since spread to several states.

== Classification ==
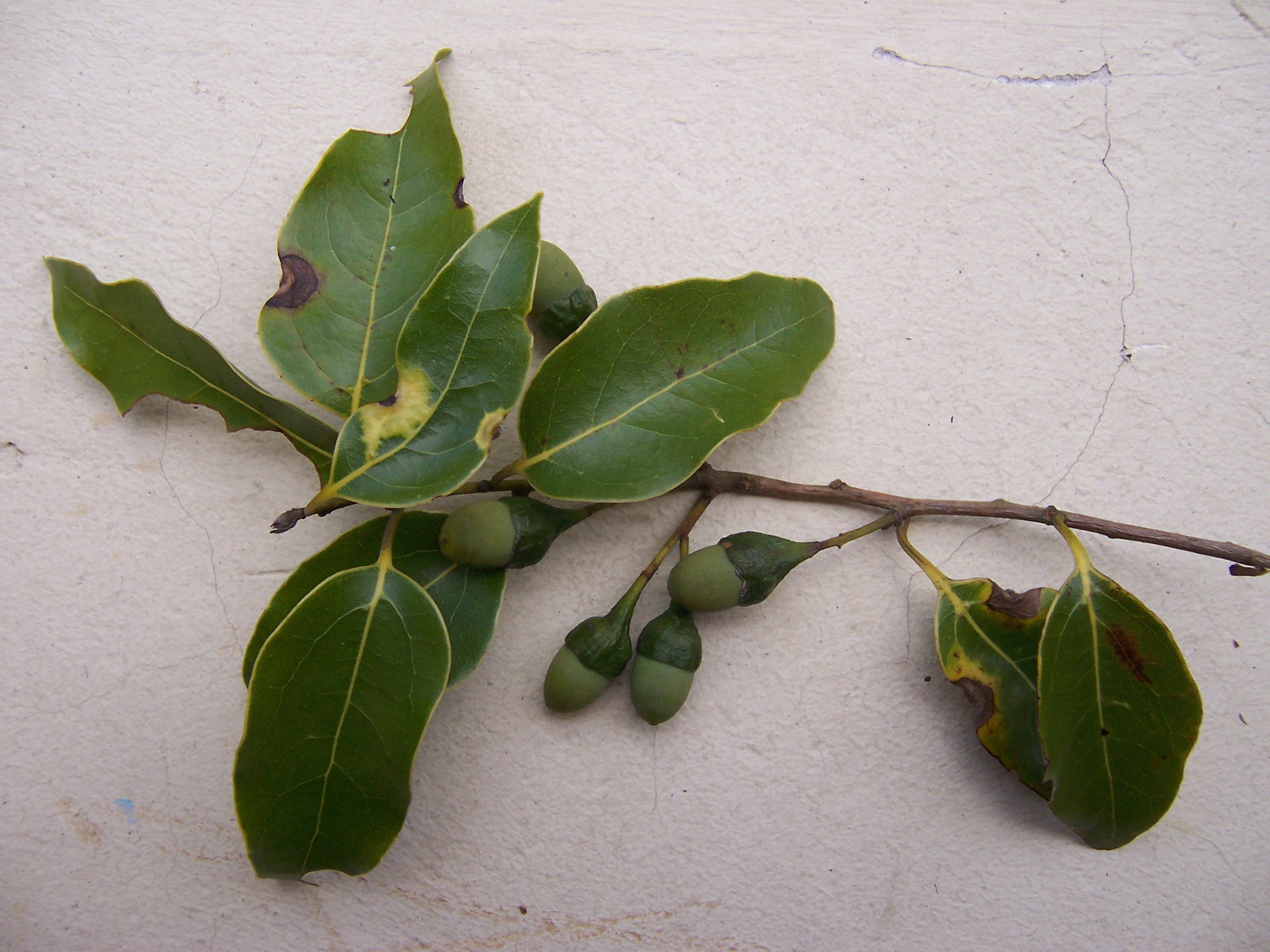
Twig of Ocotea obtusata with unripe fruit with an appearance similar to an acorn

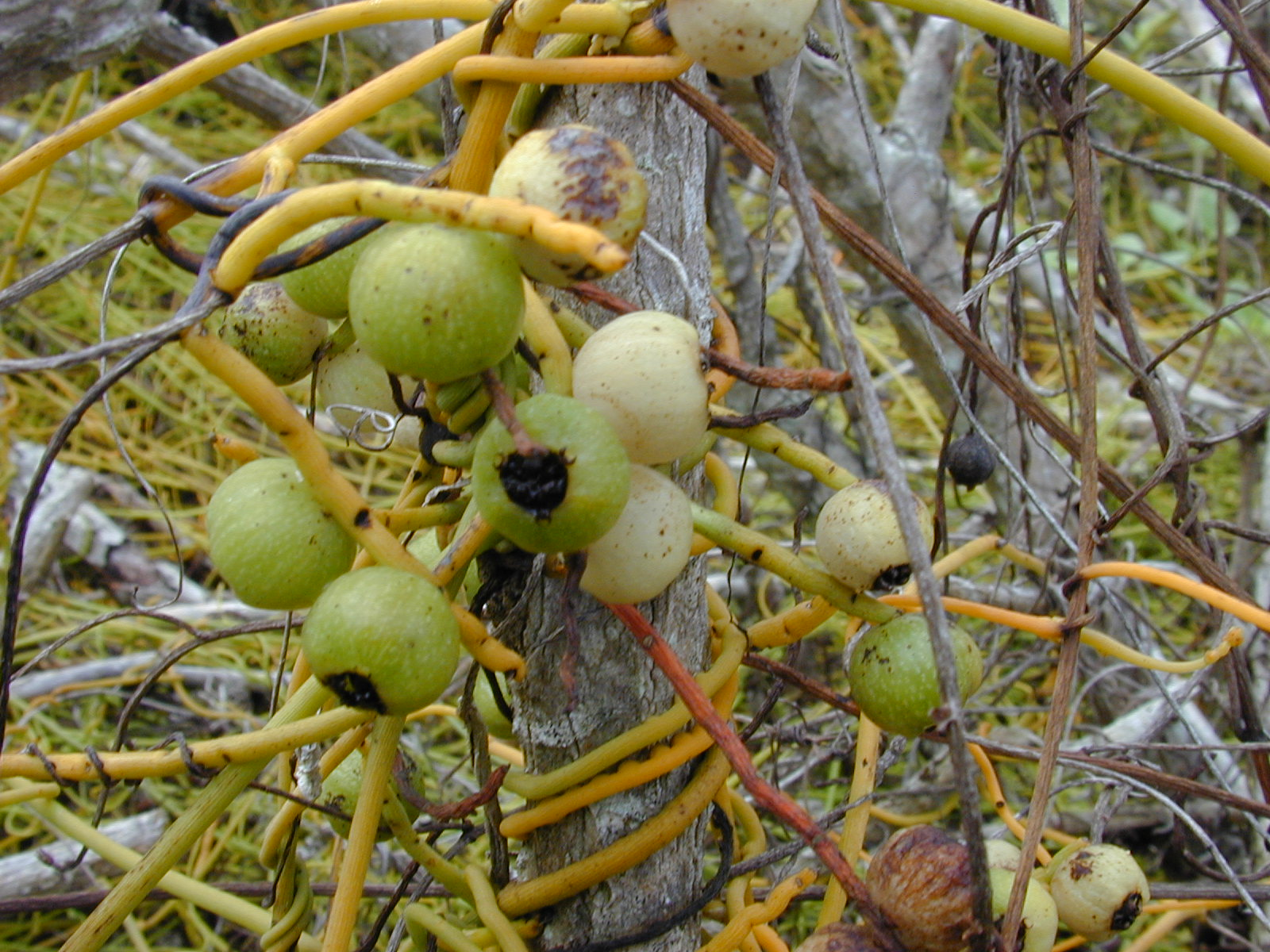
Cassytha filiformis fruits

Classification within the Lauraceae is not fully resolved. Multiple classification schemes based on a variety of morphological and anatomical characteristics have been proposed, but none are fully accepted. According to Judd et al. (2007), the suprageneric classification proposed by van der Werff and Richter (1996) is currently the authority. However, due to an array of molecular and embryological evidence that disagrees with the groupings, it is not fully accepted by the scientific community. Their classification is based on inflorescence structure and wood and bark anatomy. It divides Lauraceae into two subfamilies, Cassythoideae and Lauroideae. The Cassythoideae comprise a single genus, Cassytha, and are defined by their herbaceous, parasitic habit. The Lauroideae are then divided into three tribes: Laureae, Perseeae, and Cryptocaryeae.

The subfamily Cassythoideae is not fully supported. Backing has come from matK sequences of chloroplast genes while a questionable placement of Cassytha has been concluded from analysis of intergenetic spacers of chloroplast and nuclear genomes. Embryological studies also appear contradictory. One study by Heo et al. (1998) supports the subfamily. It found that Cassytha develops an ab initio cellular-type endosperm and the rest of the family (with one exception) develops a nuclear-type endosperm. Kimoto et al. (2006) suggest Cassytha should be placed in the tribe Cryptocaryeae because it shares a glandular anther tapetum and an embryo sac protruding from the nucellus with other members of the Cryptocaryeae.

The tribes Laureae and Perseeae are not well supported by any molecular or embryological studies. Sequences of the matK chloroplast gene, as well as sequences of chloroplast and nuclear genomes, reveal close relationships between the two tribes. Embryological evidence does not support a clear division between the two tribes, either. Genera such as Caryodaphnopsis and Aspidostemon that share embryological characteristics with one tribe and wood and bark characteristics or inflorescence characteristics with another tribe blur the division of these groups. All available evidence, except for inflorescence morphology and wood and bark anatomy, fails to support separate tribes Laureae and Perseeae.

The tribe Cryptocaryeae is partially supported by molecular and embryological studies. Chloroplast and nuclear genomes support a tribal grouping that contains all the genera circumscribed by van der Weff and Richter (1996), as well as three additional genera. Partial support for the tribe is also attained from the matK sequences of chloroplast genes as well as embryology.

Challenges in Lauraceae classification

The knowledge of the species comprising the Lauraceae is incomplete. In 1991, about 25-30% of neotropical Lauraceae species had not been described. In 2001, embryological studies had only been completed on individuals from 26 genera yielding a 38.9% level of knowledge, in terms of embryology, for this family. Additionally, the huge amount of variation within the family poses a major challenge for developing a reliable classification.

== Phytochemistry ==
The adaptation of Lauraceae to new environments has followed a long evolutionary journey which has led to many specializations, including defensive or deterrent systems against other organisms.

Phytochemicals in the Lauraceae are numerous and diverse. Benzylisoquinoline alkaloids include aporphines and oxoaporphines, as well as derivatives of morphinans. Essential oils include terpenoids, benzyl benzoates, allylphenols, and propenylphenols. Lignans and neolignans are present, along with S-methyl-5-O-flavonoids, proanthocyanidins, cinnamoylamides, phenylpyrroles, styryl pyrones, polyketides (acetogenins), furanosesquiterpenes, and germacranolidous, heliangolidous, eudesmanolidous and guaianolidous sesquiterpene lactones.

== Genera ==
58 genera are accepted.

- Actinodaphne Nees
- Aiouea Aubl.
- Alseodaphne Nees
- Alseodaphnopsis H.W.Li & J.Li
- Andea van der Werff
- Aniba Aubl.
- Aspidostemon Rohwer & H.G.Richt.
- Beilschmiedia Nees
- Camphora Fabr.
- Caryodaphnopsis Airy Shaw
- Cassytha Osbeck
- Chlorocardium Rohwer, H.G.Richt. & van der Werff
- Cinnadenia Kosterm.
- Cinnamomum Schaeff.
- Clinostemon Kuhlm. & Samp.
- Cryptocarya R.Br.
- †Marmarthia
- Damburneya Raf.
- Dehaasia Blume
- Dicypellium Nees & Mart.
- Dodecadenia Nees
- Endiandra R.Br.
- Endlicheria Nees
- Eusideroxylon Teijsm. & Binn.
- Hexapora Hook.f.
- Hypodaphnis Stapf
- Kubitzkia van der Werff
- Kuloa Trofimov & Rohwer
- Laurus L.
- Licaria Aubl.
- Lindera Thunb.
- Litsea Lam.
- Machilus Rumph. ex Nees
- Mespilodaphne Nees
- Mezilaurus Kuntze ex Taub.
- Nectandra Rol. ex Rottb.
- Neocinnamomum H.Liu
- Neolitsea Merr.
- Nothaphoebe Blume
- Ocotea Aubl.
- Paraia Rohwer, H.G.Richt. & van der Werff
- Parasassafras D.G.Long
- Persea Mill. (synonym Apollonias Nees)
- Phoebe Nees
- Phyllostemonodaphne Kosterm.
- Pleurothyrium Nees
- Potameia Thouars
- Potoxylon Kosterm.
- Rhodostemonodaphne Rohwer & Kubitzki
- Sassafras J.Presl.
- †Sassafrasoxylon
- Sextonia van der Werff
- Sinopora J.Li, N.H.Xia & H.W.Li
- Syndiclis Hook.f.
- Tamala Raf.
- Triadodaphne Kosterm.
- †Ulminium Unger
- Umbellularia Nutt.
- Urbanodendron Mez
- Williamodendron Kubitzki & H.G.Richt.
- Yasunia van der Werff

== Popular culture ==
A laurel wreath, a round or horseshoe-shaped wreath made of connected laurel branches and leaves, is an ancient symbol of triumph in classical Western culture originating in Greek mythology, and is associated in some countries with academic or literary achievement.
