= Río Pilcomayo National Park =

National park in Argentina

- Parque Nacional Río Pilcomayo
- IUCN category II (national park)
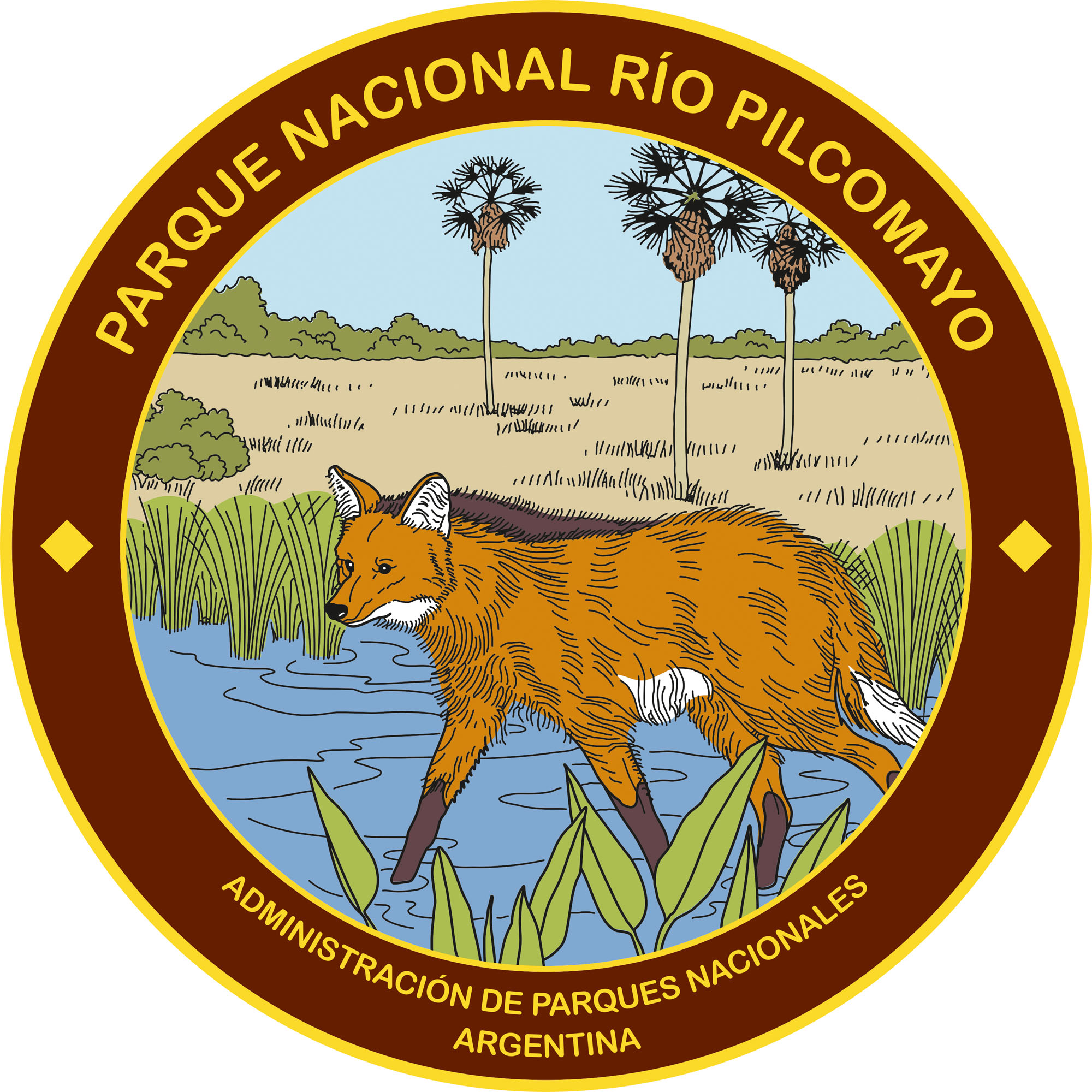
- Emblem of the Río Pilcomayo National Park

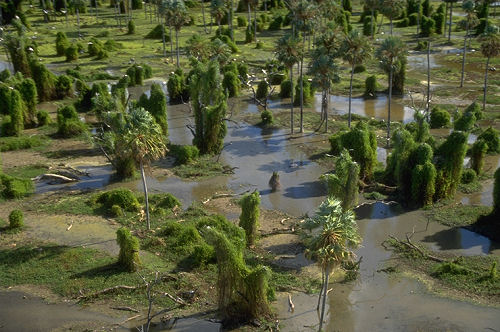
- Marshes of the Río Pilcomayo National Park

- Location within Argentina
- Location: Formosa Province, Argentina
- Coordinates: 25°04′00″S 58°07′00″W
- Area: 51,889 ha (128,220 acres)
- Established: 1951
- Governing body: Administración de Parques Nacionales
- Website: www.parquesnacionales.gob.ar/areas-protegidas/region-noreste/pn-rio-pilcomayo/

Ramsar Wetland
- Official name: Rio Pilcomayo
- Designated: 4 May 1992
- Reference no.: 557

The Río Pilcomayo National Park (Spanish: Parque Nacional Río Pilcomayo) is a national park located in the northeastern part of the Argentine province of Formosa, on the border with Paraguay. Established on September 29, 1951 to protect the natural features (grasslands, marshes, creeks, lakes and forests), typical of the Humid Chaco ecoregion, the park is included in the Ramsar Convention's list of wetlands of international importance.

== Topography ==
The park occupies a large plain, which was formed when a depression in Paleozoic crystalline rocks was filled with organic and inorganic sediments, thus creating a sedimentary basin. The uppermost sediment levels are of fluvial and aeolian origin. The eastern parts of the park are dominated by silts and clays, creating less permeable soils, while the western parts contain soils that are coarser and more porous.

There are faults that were generated during formation of the Andes, lying parallel to the Paraguay River. While the park's territory is gently sloping down from west to east, there is very little variety in elevation. The subtle differences become important in times of heavy rains and floods, when the area becomes inundated with pools of water connected by channels forming in the most low-lying areas.

== Hydrography ==
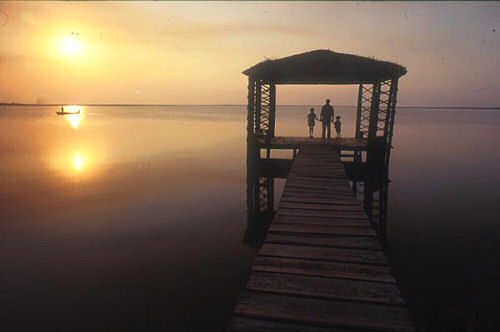
An observation platform overlooking Laguna Blanca.

The Pilcomayo River, after which the park is named, is the main watercourse of the area. During the wet season, the river and its tributaries flood the nearby areas, creating large swaths of interconnected lakes and marshes, most of which are temporary. The southern end of the park contains a larger lake called Laguna Blanca, which is a habitat for many waterfowl species and a resting point for migratory bird species coming from the Northern Hemisphere.

== Climate ==
The park is located in a subtropical zone with annual mean temperature of 23 °C (73 °F) and annual mean precipitation of 1,200 millimetres (47 in). Summer temperatures can exceed 40 °C (104 °F), but during winters, frost is not uncommon. Winters are dry, while precipitation peaks in March and November. The area is affected by frequent tornadoes.

== Flora ==
For the purposes of classifying the park's types of plants, the area can be divided into 4 distinct zones. One is savanna, which is dominated by the Caranday wax palm, an unofficial emblem of the area, towering over a dense cover of herbaceous plants (especially from the genus Scirpus). Other trees include such species as Acacia caven and Prosopis nigra.

Wetlands are dominated by aquatic vegetation. Floating plants include water hyacinths, Limnocharitaceae, Nymphoides and Ludwigia.

Another distinct zone is adjacent to the Pilcomayo River and its former channels, which are frequently flooded. It is dominated by riparian vegetation. Figs and sweetwood trees can be found there, covered by many species of lianas, vines and epiphytes.

The patchy vegetation of the higher lands, forming distinctive "mountain islands", represent the fourth zone. Quebracho trees (Schinopsis balansae and Aspidosperma quebracho-blanco) can frequently be found there.

== Fauna ==
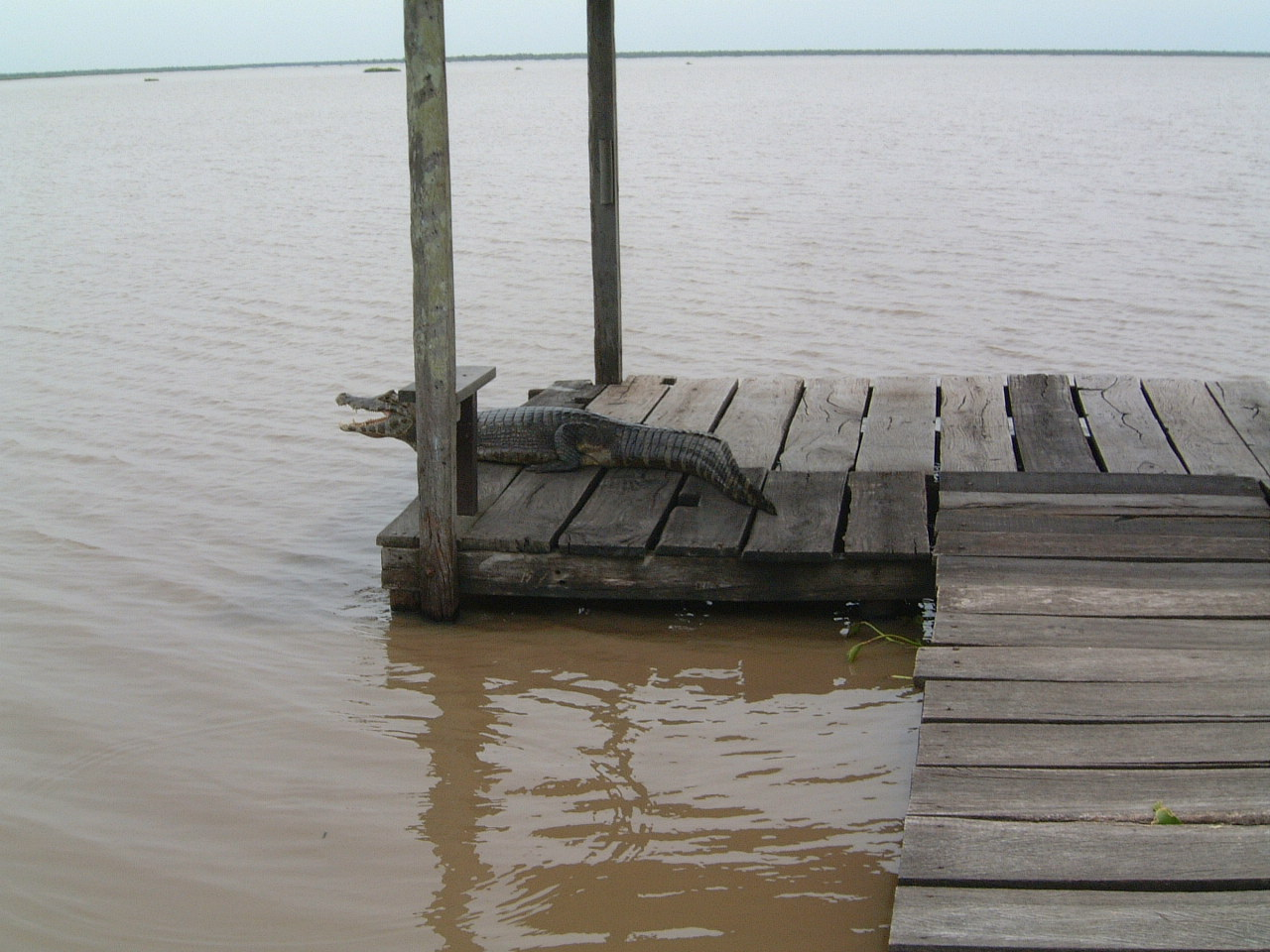
A yacare caiman on a Laguna Blanca observation platform.

Higher lands are inhabited by such mammals as the gray brocket, capybara, peccary, howler monkey and puma; birds include chachalacas and rails. The maned wolf can be found in the lowlands, along with such birds as the greater rhea and seriemas.

The Park is also home to jaguars (Panthera onca palustris), whose populations are seriously threatened in Argentina, and this National Park, together with El Impenetrable in Chaco are the last strongholds of the feline in the Argentine Chaco, along with the populations located in the Yungas of Salta and Jujuy, and in the Misiones jungle.

Aquatic environments are inhabited by storks, herons, roseate spoonbills and ducks. There are two caiman species: the broad-snouted caiman and the yacare caiman. The fish population includes species from the Hoplosternum that can use atmospheric air and thus tolerate droughts that frequently affect shallow water bodies in the area.

The snake population is represented by species such as the yellow anaconda (Eunectes notaeus) and Hydrodynastes gigas, a large water snake.
