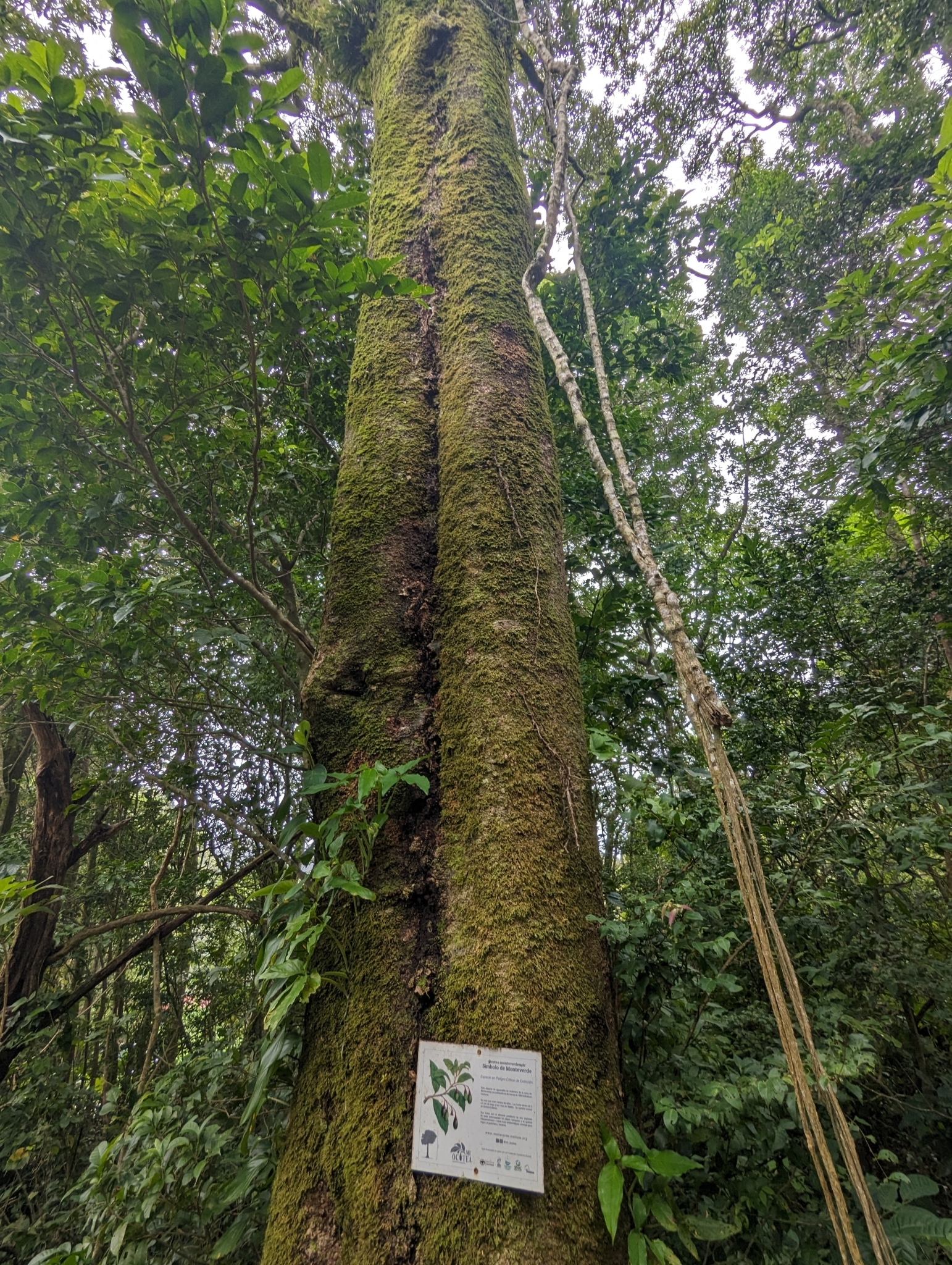

Conservation status
- Critically Endangered (IUCN 3.1)

Scientific classification
- Kingdom: Plantae
- Clade: Tracheophytes
- Clade: Angiosperms
- Clade: Magnoliids
- Order: Laurales
- Family: Lauraceae
- Genus: Ocotea
- Species: O. monteverdensis

Binomial name
- Ocotea monteverdensis William Burger

= Ocotea monteverdensis =

Species of tree

Ocotea monteverdensis (Spanish: aguacatillo, quizarrá blanco, quizarrá amarillo) is a critically endangered tree species in the family Lauraceae, endemic to the cloud forests of Costa Rica. It plays an important ecological role as a food source for several frugivorous birds, including the three-wattled bellbird, which disperses its seeds. The species has declined due to habitat loss, fragmentation, and low regeneration rates.

== Classification ==
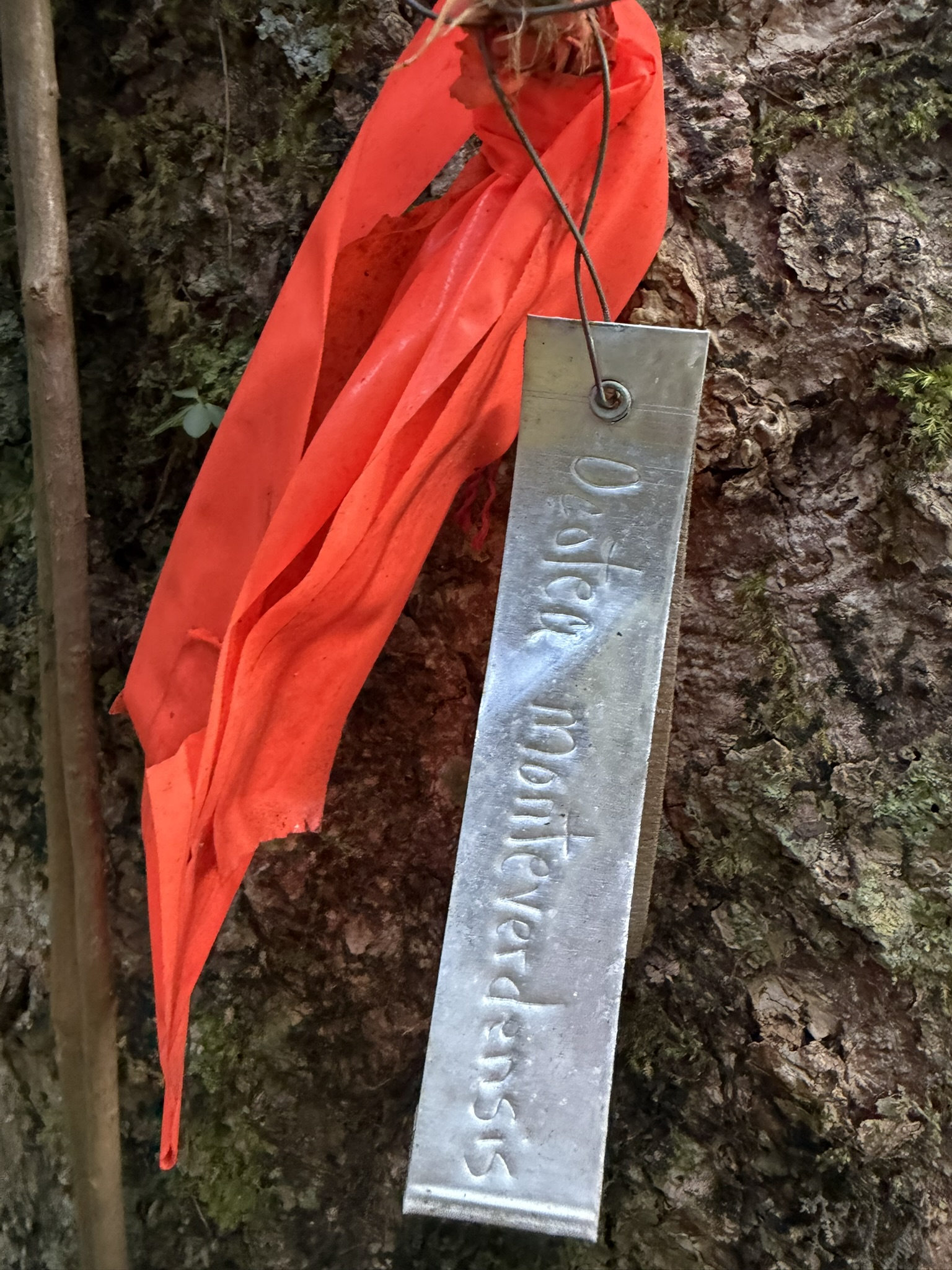
Tree tag of Ocotea monteverdensis

The species was first described by William Burger in 1990. The holotype is housed at the Field Museum of Natural History. As Burger points out, as is the case with all Lauraceae, the exact taxonomic status of O. monteverdensis within the family is complicated, and details continue to be researched. Van der Werff points out that O. monteverdensis is easily confused with other Lauraceae, including Ocotea hartshorniana.

== Ecology ==
The fruit of O. monteverdensis is eaten by many tropical species, including birds and animals. These include the Black guan (Chamaepetes unicolor), the Resplendant quetzal (Pharomachrus mocinno), and especially the Three-wattled bellbird (Procnias tricarunculatus), which plays an important role in seed distribution of O. monteverdensis. The oilbird, Steatornis caripensis, is also known to feed on O. monteverdensis.

Birds known to feed on the fruit of O. monteverdensis

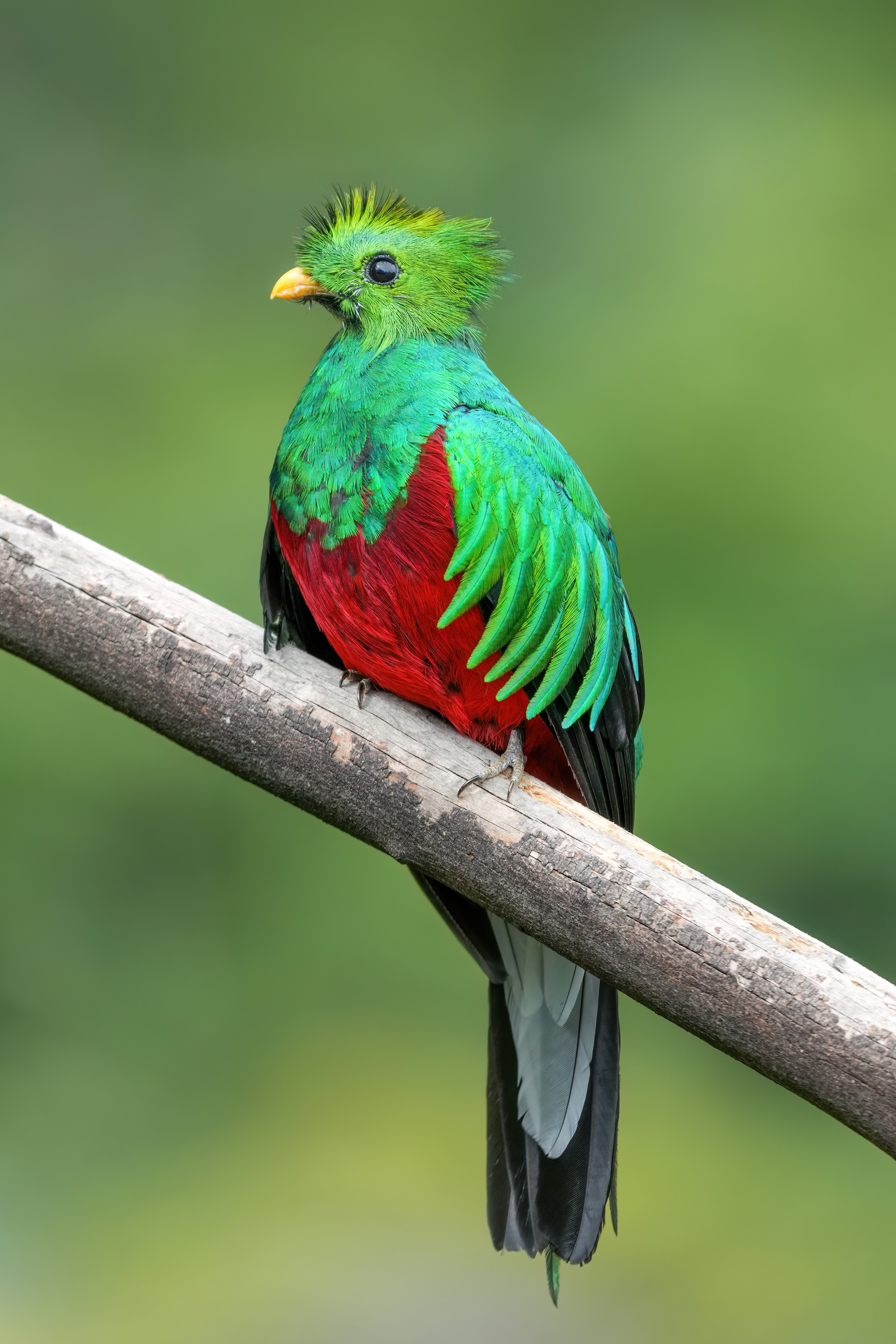
Resplendant quetzal (Pharomachrus mocinno)

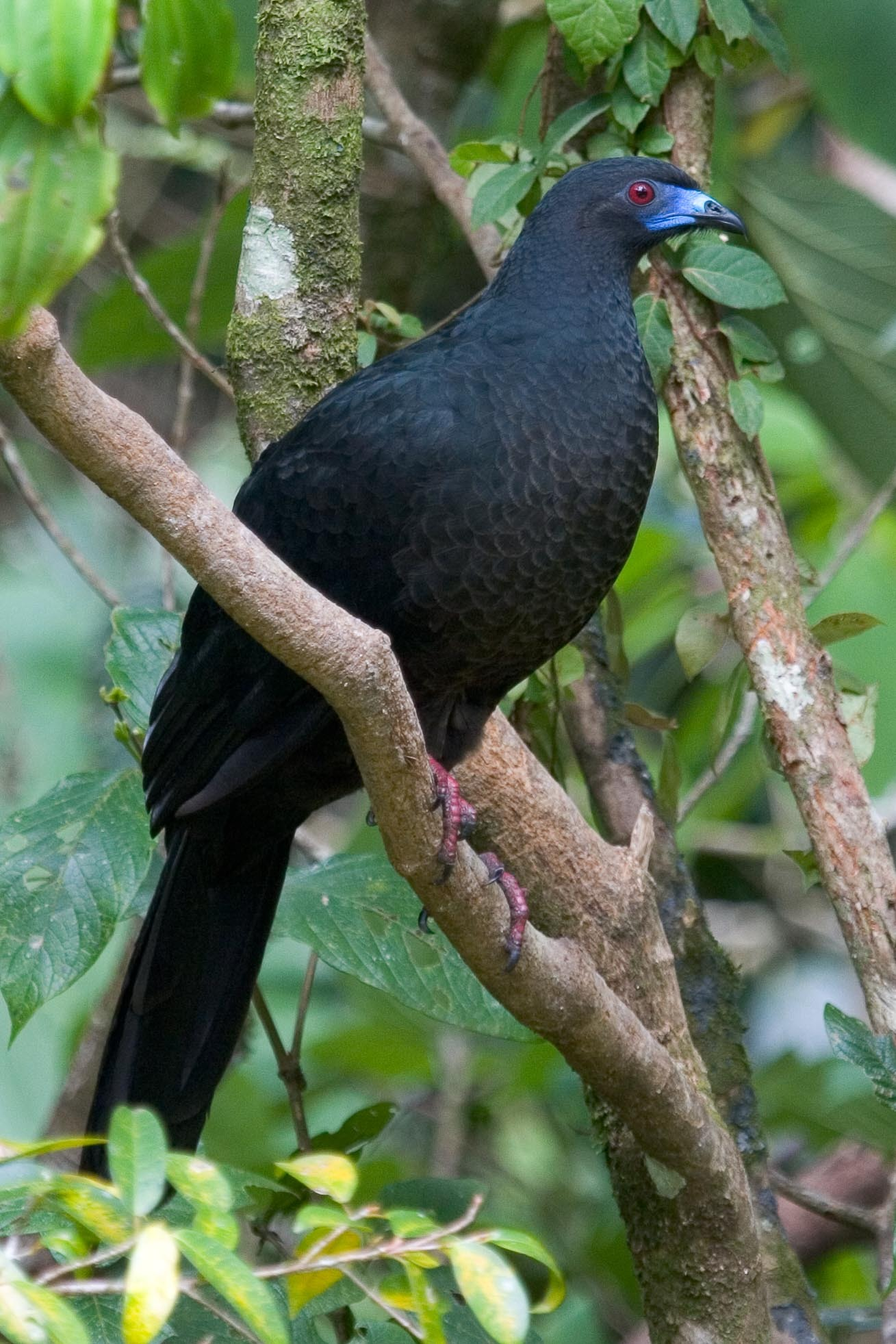
Black guan (Chamaepetes unicolor)

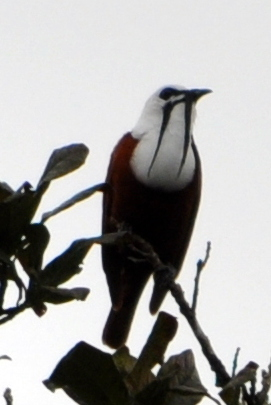
Three-wattled bellbird (Procnias tricarunculatus)

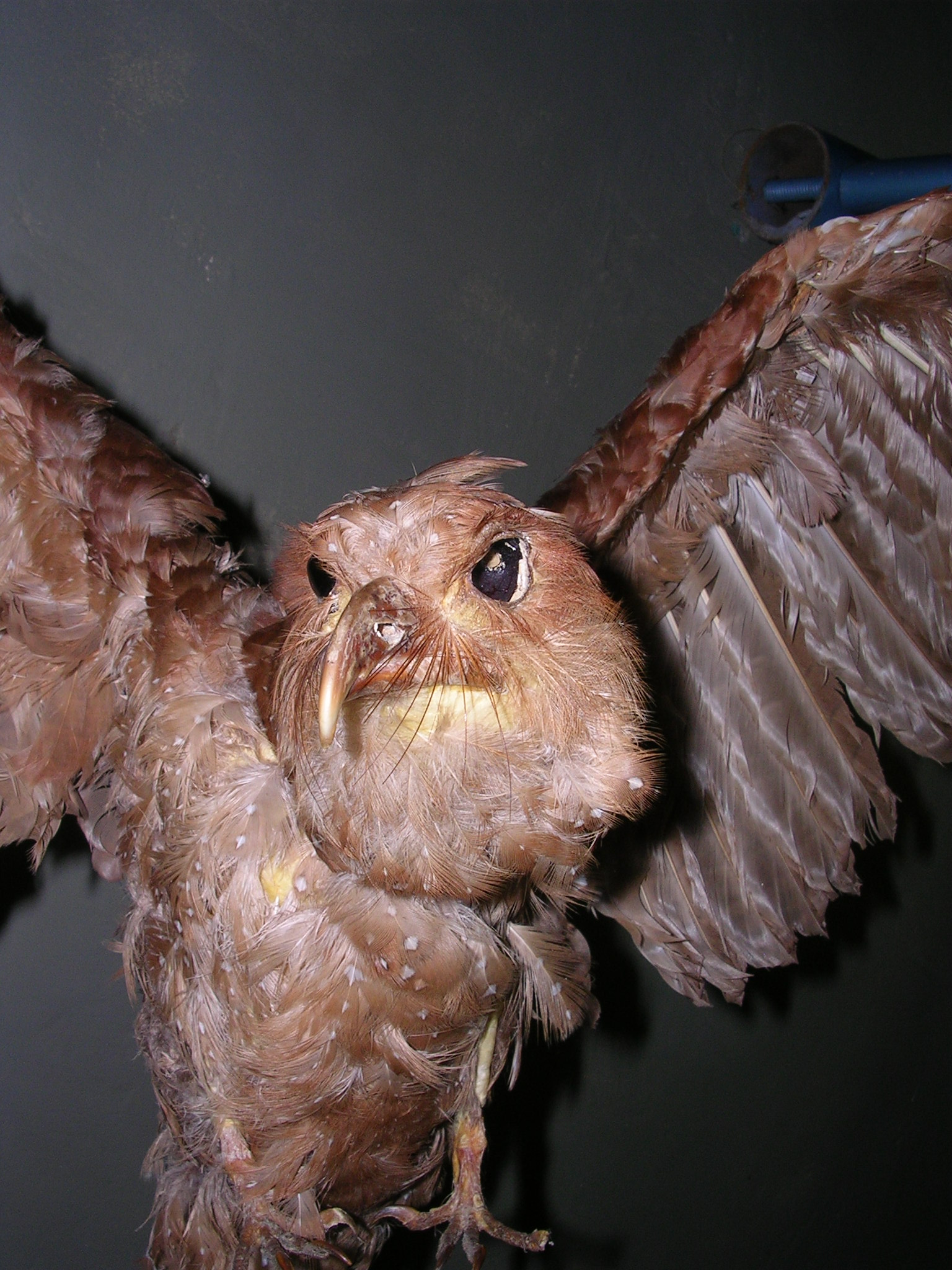
Oilbird (Steatornis caripensis)

The bellbird, in particular, plays a key role in the life cycle of O. monteverdensis. It exhibits a strong preference for consuming the fruit. After consumption, the bird regurgitates the seed from its perch, which tends to be on dead branches. The increased level of sunlight increases the likelihood that seedlings will be viable.

Three-wattled bellbird regurgitating a seed it cannot digest. Filmed in Bajo Tigre Reserve, Monteverde, Costa Rica.

Diagram illustrating the approximate size of the fruit of Ocotea monteverdensis within its red cupola. After Burger and van der Werff (1990).

== Population and distribution ==
Ocotea monteverdensis is endemic to Costa Rica, where it is only found in cloud forest environments at elevations of approximately 1,000 to 1,500 meters above sea level. It is found primarily on the Pacific slope of the Cordillera de Tilaran. Recent estimates put the number of extant mature trees at 870. Of these, 760 are within the Monteverde area, and another 100 trees are found in a fragmented population around the Orosí Volcano complex near Nicaragua. Estimates suggest that the population has reduced by at least 95% over the past 180 years.

Tropicos Elevation Sample
Elevation (m)	Number of specimens
1600	0
1500	2
1400	11
1300	2
1200	2
1100	1
1000	2
900	2
800	2
700	1

== Conservation ==
Ocotea monteverdensis is classified as Critically Endangered. The main threat to the species is habitat loss and deforestation due to agriculture, housing development, and tourist development. Public outreach programs have been have been sponsored by the Franklinia Foundation, the Monteverde Institute, Costa Rican Conservation Foundation, and the Cotyledon Fund. One of the challenges for reforestation of the species is its slow reproduction cycle; it flowers only once every three years, and depends on particular animals for seed dispersal. Furthermore, about 70% of the extant trees are found on private land and are thus unprotected.

The Franklinia Foundation, furthermore, has sponsored several stages of conservation work on O. monteverdensis in partnership with the Monteverde Institute. The project aimed to plant 5,000 O. monteverdensis seedlings, and to carry out public outreach and further research.

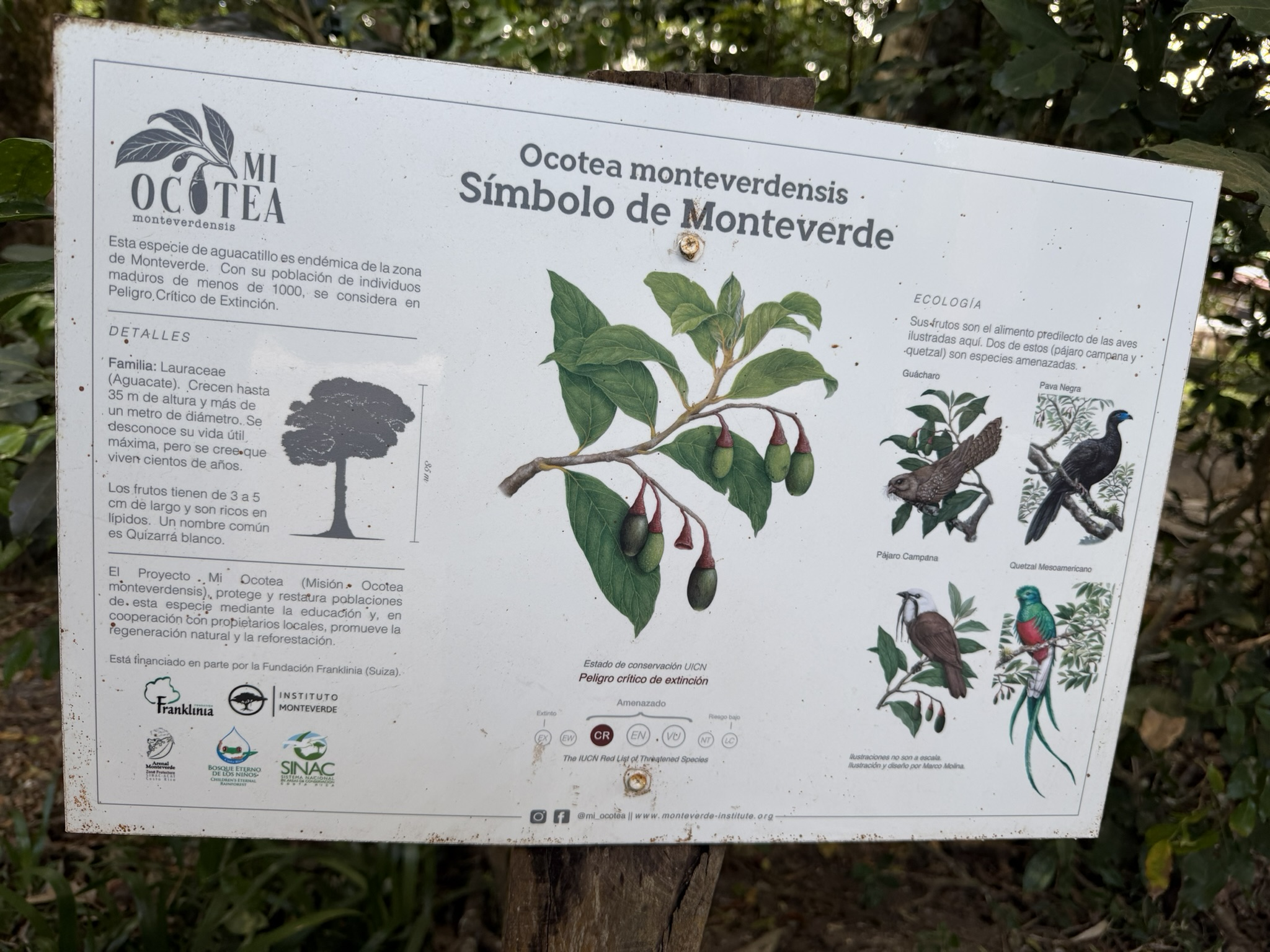
Sign from the Mi Ocotea ("My Ocotea") project describing Ocotea monteverdensis
