= Ocotea quadriporata =

Conservation status
- Near Threatened (IUCN 3.1)

Scientific classification
- Kingdom: Plantae
- Clade: Tracheophytes
- Clade: Angiosperms
- Clade: Magnoliids
- Order: Laurales
- Family: Lauraceae
- Genus: Ocotea
- Species: O. quadriporata

Binomial name
- Ocotea quadriporata (W.C.Burger) Kosterm.

Synonyms
- Povedadaphne quadriporata W.C.Burger

Monotypic genus of plants

Ocotea quadriporata is a species of evergreen "lauroid" tree endemic to Costa Rica. It grows in tropical montane laurel forest habitat, a type of cloud forest.

== Description ==
Ocotea quadriporata is an evergreen hermaphrodite tree of 25 m tall, of tropical mountain cloud forest with leathery leaves alternate, simple and entire. The flowers are bisexual. Known from sites in the San Ramón Forest Reserve, near Ciudad Quesada and east of Sarapiquí river, in Heredia Province of Costa Rica.

== Classification ==
The species was first described as Povedadaphne quadriporata in 1988 by William Carl Burger, who placed in the monotypic genus Povedadaphne. It was moved into genus Ocotea in 1990 by André Joseph Guillaume Henri Kostermans. The genus name, laurel of Poveda, is dedicated to Luis J. Poveda Alvarez. Professor of National University of Costa Rica. O. quadripora resembles the neotropical Lauraceae genus Williamodendron, by the position of the anther cells, at the flat apical portion, of the anthers, which is unusual in Lauraceae. The species is characterized by an extremely rare combination of characters. There is little information regarding the species due to its scarcity.
