= Ocotea uxpanapana =

Conservation status
- Endangered (IUCN 3.1)

Scientific classification
- Kingdom: Plantae
- Clade: Tracheophytes
- Clade: Angiosperms
- Clade: Magnoliids
- Order: Laurales
- Family: Lauraceae
- Genus: Ocotea
- Species: O. uxpanapana

Binomial name
- Ocotea uxpanapana T.Wendt & van der Werff

Species of tree

Ocotea uxpanapana is a species of flowering plant in the family Lauraceae. It is a species of evergreen tree in the genus Ocotea. It is native to Chiapas, Oaxaca, and Veracruz states in southern Mexico.

It is a large tree which can grow up to 30 metres tall with a bole 1 metre in diameter. It generally flowers in February and March and fruits in September and October. It grows in lowland tropical rain forests, riparian forests, and cloud forests from 60 to 1,050 metres elevation. It typically grows at stream or wetland edges or on deep limestone-derived soils. Commonly associated trees include species of Inga, Ficus, and Augusta.
