= Ocotea robertsoniae =

Conservation status
- Vulnerable (IUCN 3.1)

Scientific classification
- Kingdom: Plantae
- Clade: Tracheophytes
- Clade: Angiosperms
- Clade: Magnoliids
- Order: Laurales
- Family: Lauraceae
- Genus: Ocotea
- Species: O. robertsoniae

Binomial name
- Ocotea robertsoniae Proctor

Species of tree

Ocotea robertsoniae is a species of evergreen tree in the flowering plant genus Ocotea of the family Lauraceae. It is endemic to Jamaica.
