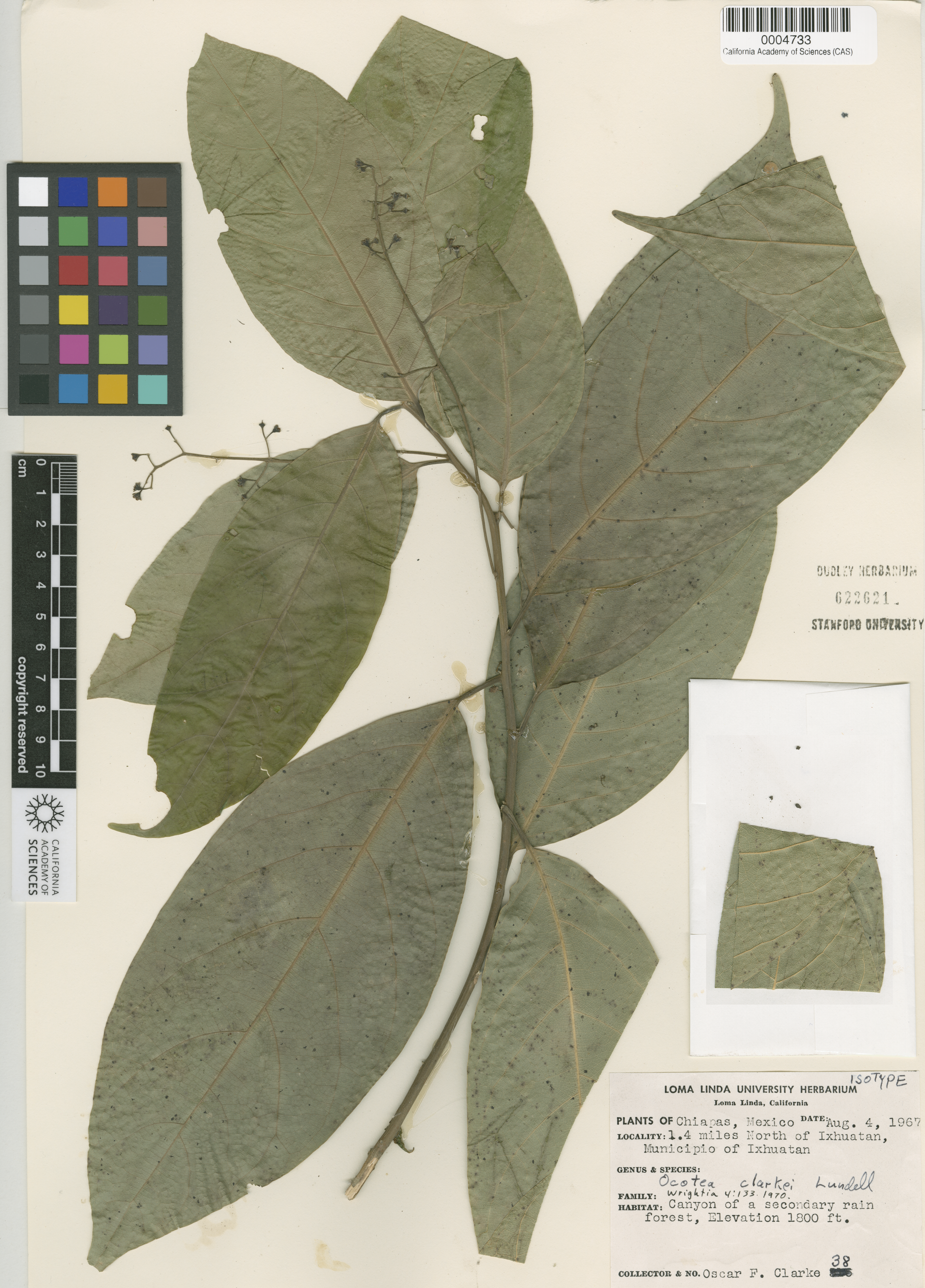

Conservation status
- Least Concern (IUCN 3.1)

Scientific classification
- Kingdom: Plantae
- Clade: Embryophytes
- Clade: Tracheophytes
- Clade: Spermatophytes
- Clade: Angiosperms
- Clade: Magnoliids
- Order: Laurales
- Family: Lauraceae
- Genus: Ocotea
- Species: O. laetevirens

Binomial name
- Ocotea laetevirens Standl. & Steyerm.

Synonyms
- Ocotea clarkei Lundell

= Ocotea laetevirens =

Species of tree

Ocotea laetevirens is a species of Ocotea in the flowering plant family Lauraceae. It is an evergreen tree native to the southern Mexican states of Chiapas, Oaxaca, and Veracruz, and to Guatemala, Honduras, Costa Rica, and Panama in Central America.
