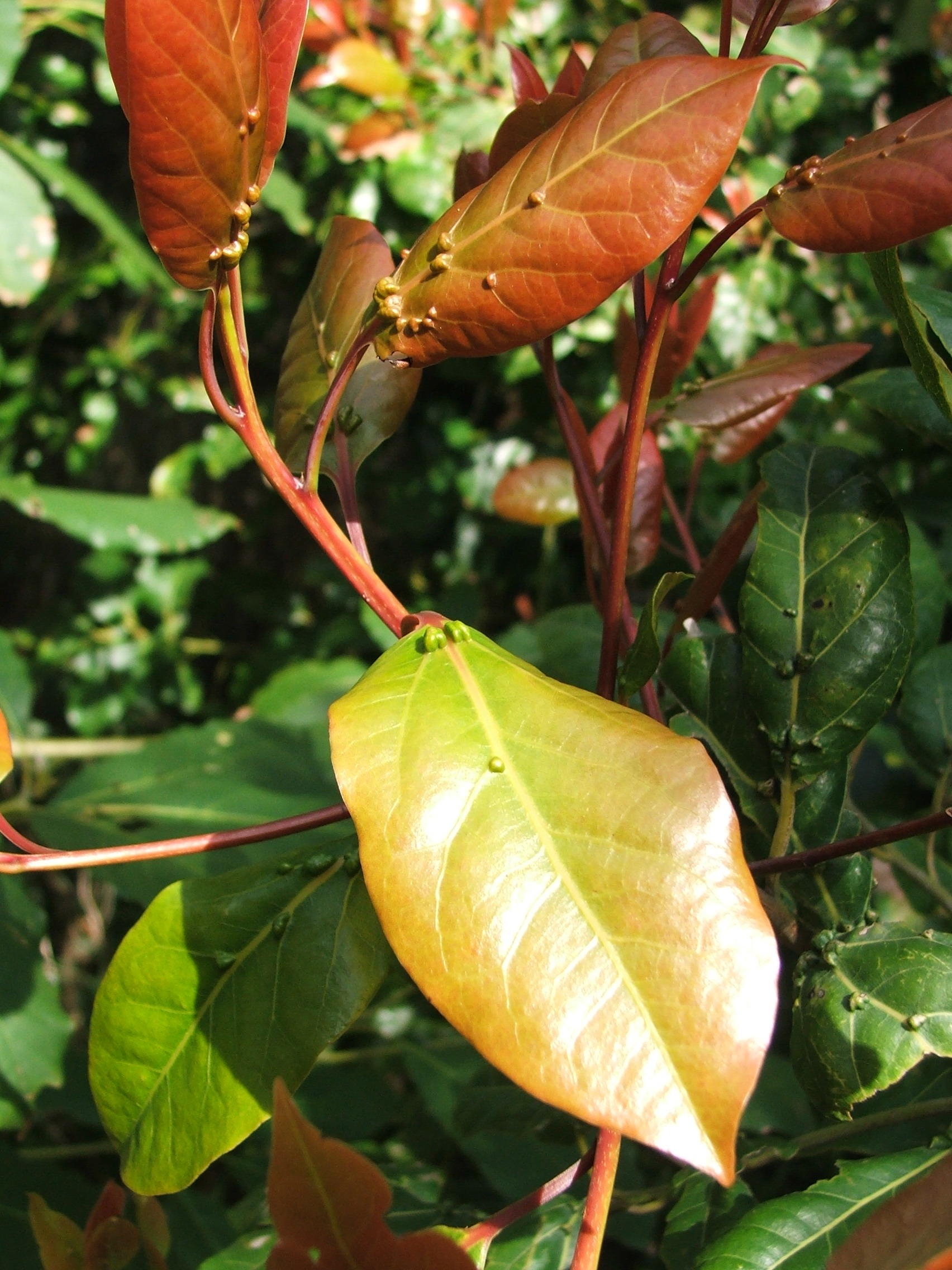

Conservation status
- Endangered (IUCN 3.1)

Scientific classification
- Kingdom: Plantae
- Clade: Tracheophytes
- Clade: Angiosperms
- Clade: Magnoliids
- Order: Laurales
- Family: Lauraceae
- Genus: Ocotea
- Species: O. bullata

Binomial name
- Ocotea bullata (Burch.) Baill. (1870)

Synonyms
- Laurus bullata Burch. (1822); Manglilla racemosa Roem. & Schult. (1819); Mespilodaphne bullata (Burch.) Meisn. (1864); Myrsine racemosa (Roem. & Schult.) Steud. (1841); Oreodaphne bullata (Burch.) Nees (1836); Quercus africana Barrow (1806); Scleroxylum racemosum Willd. ex Roem. & Schult. (1819), pro syn.

= Ocotea bullata =

Species of tree

Ocotea bullata, (stinkwood or black stinkwood, Afrikaans: Stinkhout, Xhosa: Umhlungulu, Zulu: Umnukane) is a species of flowering tree native to South Africa. It produces very fine and valuable timber which was formerly much sought after to make furniture. Due to over-exploitation it is now a protected species. Other names for it are Cape Walnut, Cape laurel, and laurel wood. The name "stinkwood" comes from a strong smell that is released when it is fresh felled.

== Description ==
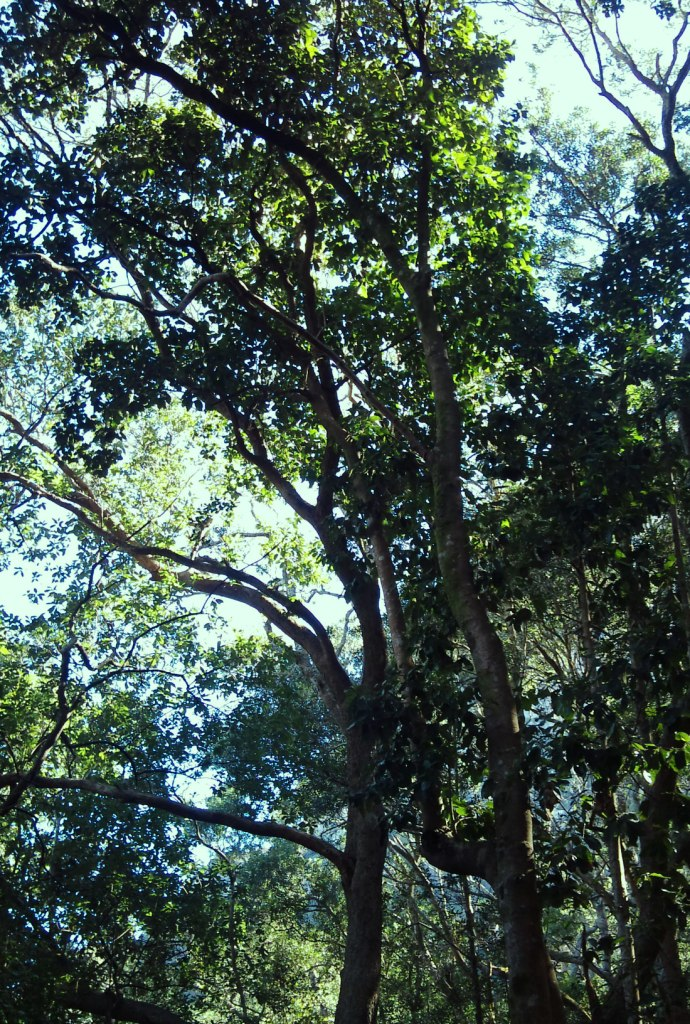
Giant stinkwood tree in indigenous afrotemperate forest, South Africa.

It is a large, evergreen tree, that grows up to 30 m tall. The leaves are dark green and glossy, with bubbles (bullae) produced on the upper surface of the leaves, hence the specific name bullata.
The flowers are often dioecious.

== Distribution ==
This tree is indigenous to the high forests of South Africa, from Table Mountain in the south, to the afro-montane forests of Limpopo in the north.
It has been effectively exterminated on the slopes of Table Mountain where it has been felled for timber and replaced by invasive pine plantations. It is also frequently and fatally stripped of its bark, which is taken for use in traditional medicine. Consequently, it is now a Protected Tree in South Africa.

== Uses ==
The tree yields a beautiful timber much prized by cabinet-makers. The wood is dark walnut or reddish brown to black with a yellow sap-wood, and the grain extremely fine, close, dense and smooth. It is said to be as durable as teak. The tree is badly overexploited and the wood is no longer available commercially.
It is one of the most popular plants traded for traditional medicine in South Africa, mainly for its perceived effectiveness in treating urinary diseases.

== Cultivation ==
Ocotea bullata can be a very impressive tree for a larger garden or park. Care must be taken with their planting and they prefer a shady position but, once established, they are quite fast growing.
Stinkwood trees can be propagated with some difficulty from cuttings. It can also be grown from seed, which must be freshly picked, cleaned and planted immediately. Germination takes around 30 days.

== Pests and diseases ==
Ocotea bullata can be attacked by the fungus-like pathogen Phytophthora cinnamomi, which causes dieback. Trees are more prone to attack in areas of indigenous forest that have been disturbed for commercial purposes.

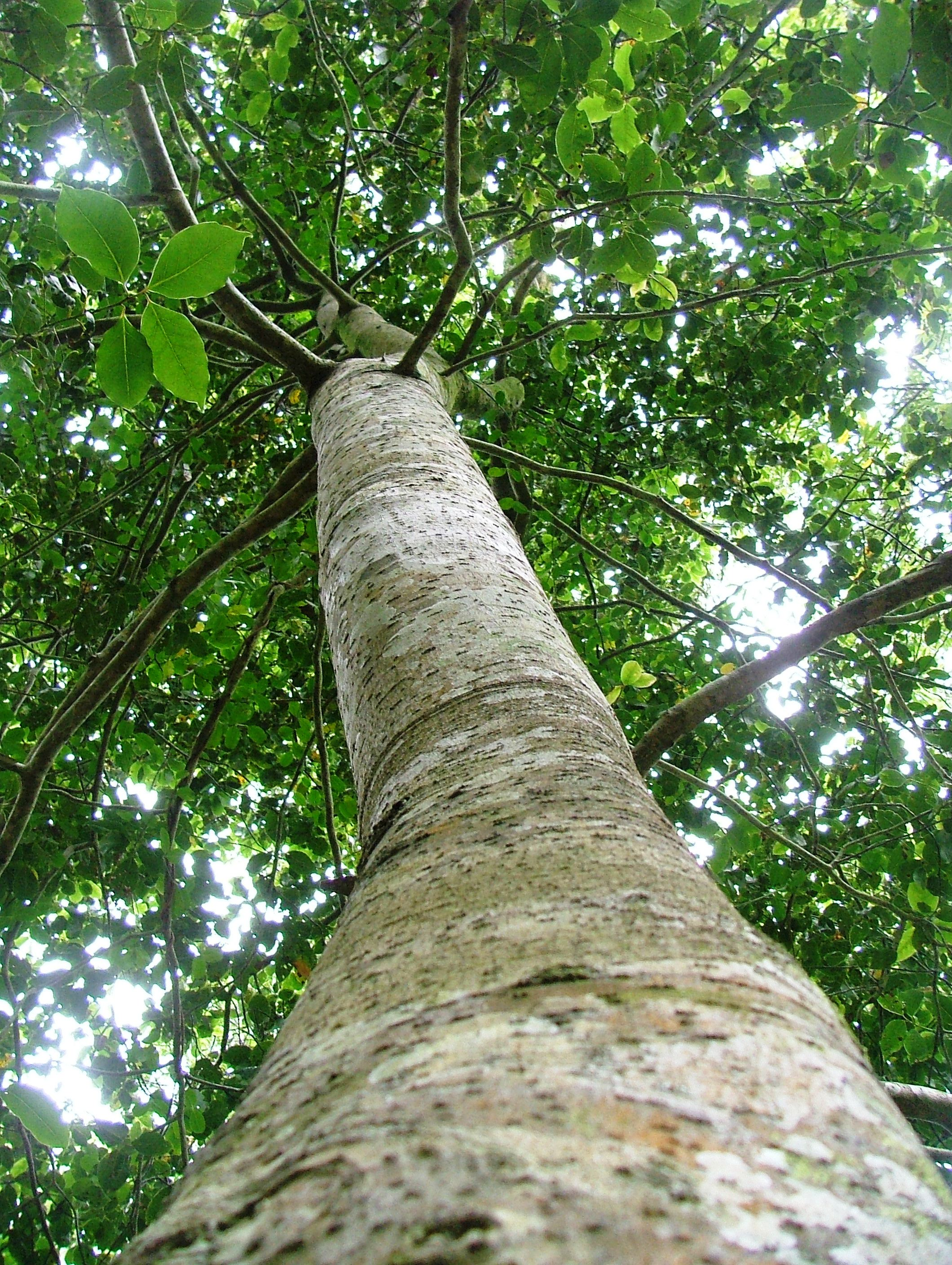
The clean, straight trunk of a young Stinkwood.

== See also ==
- List of Southern African indigenous trees
