= Ocotea amplifolia =

Conservation status
- Critically Endangered (IUCN 3.1)

Scientific classification
- Kingdom: Plantae
- Clade: Tracheophytes
- Clade: Angiosperms
- Clade: Magnoliids
- Order: Laurales
- Family: Lauraceae
- Genus: Ocotea
- Species: O. amplifolia

Binomial name
- Ocotea amplifolia (Mez & Donn.Sm.) van der Werff

Synonyms
- Cinnamomum amplifolium (Mez & Donn.Sm.) Kosterm.; Phoebe amplifolia Mez & Donn.Sm.

Species of tree

Ocotea amplifolia is a plant species in the family Lauraceae. It is a small tree endemic to Guatemala where it has only been found in the department Quiché.
