= Ocotea pachypoda =

Conservation status
- Endangered (IUCN 3.1)

Scientific classification
- Kingdom: Plantae
- Clade: Tracheophytes
- Clade: Angiosperms
- Clade: Magnoliids
- Order: Laurales
- Family: Lauraceae
- Genus: Ocotea
- Species: O. pachypoda

Binomial name
- Ocotea pachypoda Mez & Sodiro

Species of tree

Ocotea pachypoda is a species of evergreen tree in the genus Ocotea of the family Lauraceae. It is endemic to Ecuador. Its natural habitat is subtropical or tropical moist montane forests. It is thought that this species is most threatened by colonization, deforestation, and mining. It is known from two collections, both of which were taken from the Cotacachi Volcano.
