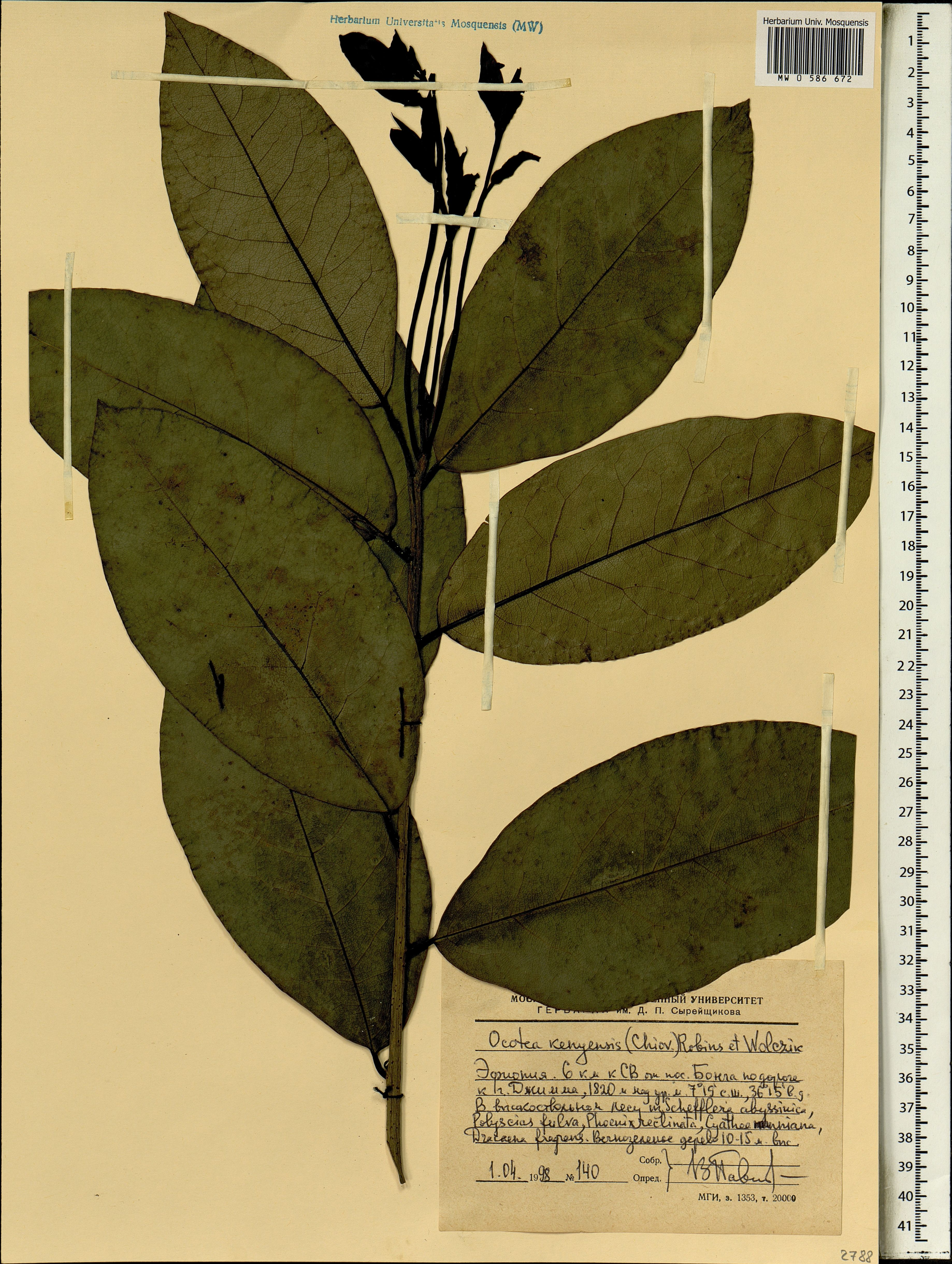

Conservation status
- Vulnerable (IUCN 2.3)

Scientific classification
- Kingdom: Plantae
- Clade: Tracheophytes
- Clade: Angiosperms
- Clade: Magnoliids
- Order: Laurales
- Family: Lauraceae
- Genus: Ocotea
- Species: O. kenyensis

Binomial name
- Ocotea kenyensis (Chiov.) Robyns & Wilczek

Synonyms
- List: Ocotea argylei Robyns; Ocotea viridis Kosterm.; Tylostemon kenyensis Chiov.

= Ocotea kenyensis =

Species of tree

Ocotea kenyensis is a species of plant in the family Lauraceae. It is found in the Democratic Republic of the Congo, Eswatini, Ethiopia, Kenya, Malawi, Mozambique, Rwanda, South Africa, Sudan, Tanzania, Uganda, and Zimbabwe. It is threatened by habitat loss.
