= Ocotea rugosa =

Conservation status
- Near Threatened (IUCN 3.1)

Scientific classification
- Kingdom: Plantae
- Clade: Tracheophytes
- Clade: Angiosperms
- Clade: Magnoliids
- Order: Laurales
- Family: Lauraceae
- Genus: Ocotea
- Species: O. rugosa

Binomial name
- Ocotea rugosa van der Warff

Species of tree

Ocotea rugosa is a species of evergreen tree to 10 m (33 ft) tall in the plant genus Ocotea, in the family Lauraceae. It is endemic to Andean Ecuador at an altitude of 1,700 to 2,500 m (5,600 to 8,200 ft). Its natural habitat is subtropical or tropical moist montane forests and cloud forest. This species requires moisture and protection of other trees for growing. The principal threats are fires, grazing, and the conversion of forest to farmland.

In Ecuador it is known from ten widely scattered populations, including the Parque Nacional Llanganates, Chillanes-El Tambo, Pichincha volcano, Guajalito river, Pululahua, Antisana and Cayambe-Coca reserves.

The fragrant flowers are whitish with a chalice tan. The fruit is half covered by a dome, like an acorn. The fruits are dark green.
