= Ocotea rivularis =

Conservation status
- Near Threatened (IUCN 3.1)

Scientific classification
- Kingdom: Plantae
- Clade: Tracheophytes
- Clade: Angiosperms
- Clade: Magnoliids
- Order: Laurales
- Family: Lauraceae
- Genus: Ocotea
- Species: O. rivularis

Binomial name
- Ocotea rivularis Standl. & L.O.Williams

Species of tree

Ocotea rivularis is a species of evergreen tree in the plant genus Ocotea of the family Lauraceae. It is endemic to Costa Rica.
