= Ocotea jorge-escobarii =

Conservation status
- Least Concern (IUCN 3.1)

Scientific classification
- Kingdom: Plantae
- Clade: Tracheophytes
- Clade: Angiosperms
- Clade: Magnoliids
- Order: Laurales
- Family: Lauraceae
- Genus: Ocotea
- Species: O. jorge-escobarii

Binomial name
- Ocotea jorge-escobarii C.Nelson

Species of tree

Ocotea jorge-escobarii is a species of plant in the family Lauraceae. It is a tree endemic to Honduras and Nicaragua in Central America. The IUCN Red List assesses it as Least Concern.
