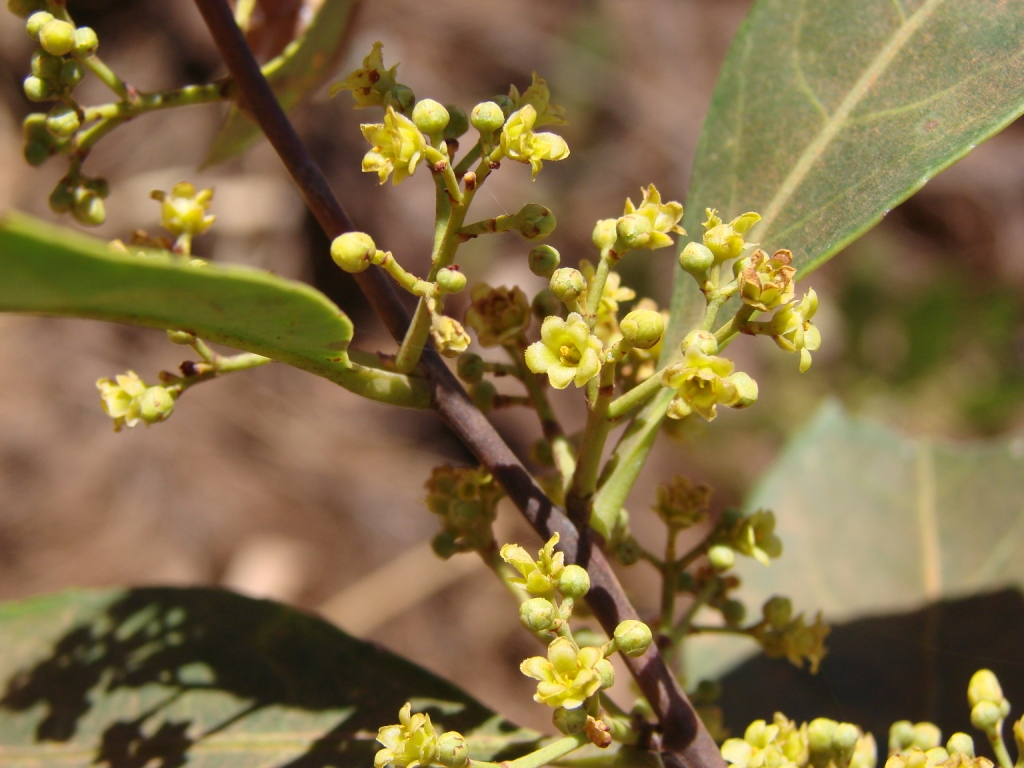

Conservation status
- Least Concern (IUCN 3.1)

Scientific classification
- Kingdom: Plantae
- Clade: Tracheophytes
- Clade: Angiosperms
- Clade: Magnoliids
- Order: Laurales
- Family: Lauraceae
- Genus: Ocotea
- Species: O. aciphylla

Binomial name
- Ocotea aciphylla (Nees) Mez

Synonyms
- Ocotea acypahilla (lapsus)

= Ocotea aciphylla =

Species of plant

Ocotea aciphylla is a species of Ocotea in the plant family Lauraceae. It forms a tree 12–18 m tall. It has small hermaphrodite flowers of 3–4 mm long. It is found in the Amazon River basin mostly to 1200 m.
