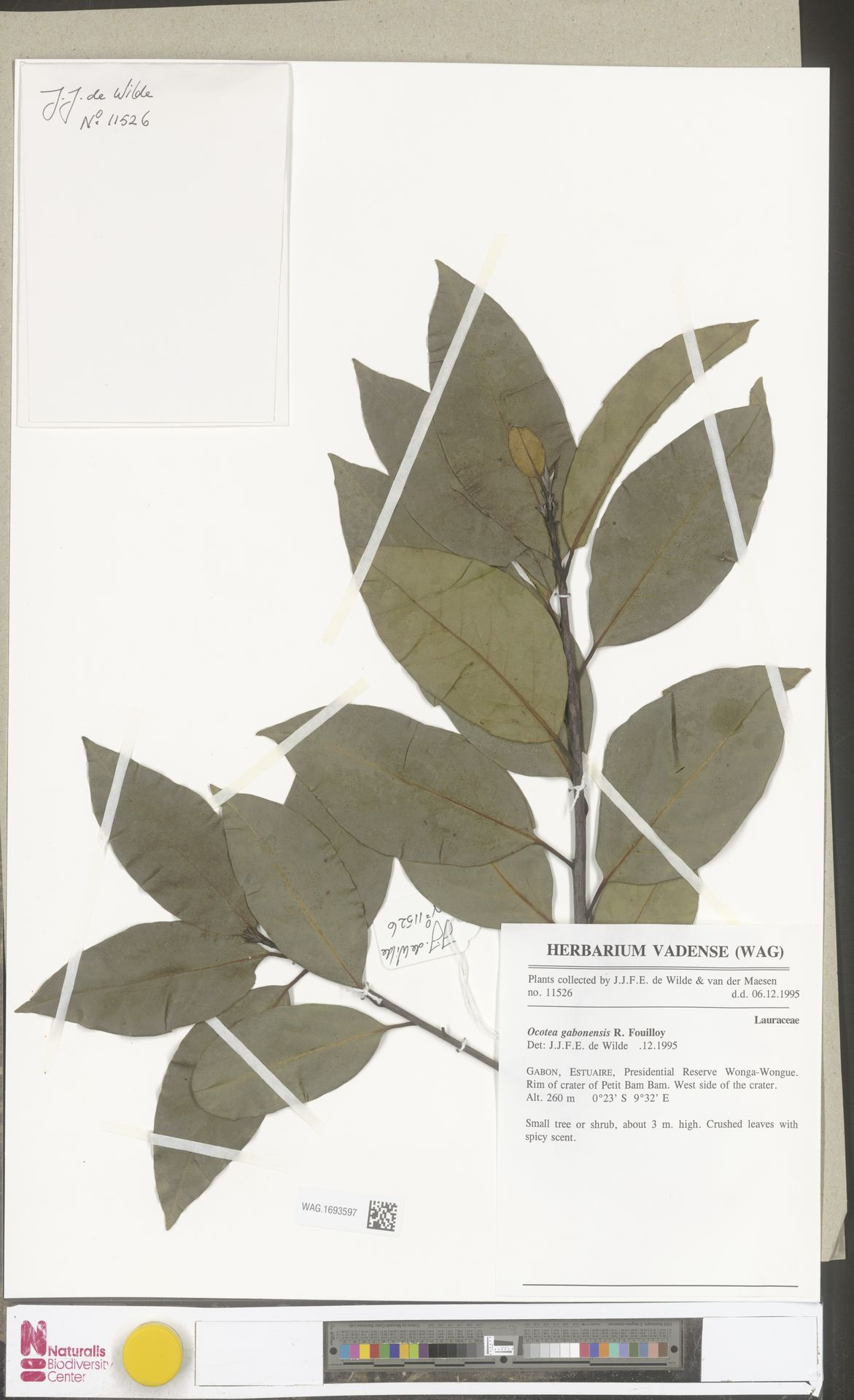

Conservation status
- Least Concern (IUCN 3.1)

Scientific classification
- Kingdom: Plantae
- Clade: Tracheophytes
- Clade: Angiosperms
- Clade: Magnoliids
- Order: Laurales
- Family: Lauraceae
- Genus: Ocotea
- Species: O. gabonensis

Binomial name
- Ocotea gabonensis Fouilloy

= Ocotea gabonensis =

Species of tree

Ocotea gabonensis is a species of plant in the family Lauraceae.

It is an evergreen tree in the genus Ocotea.

It is endemic to Gabon.
