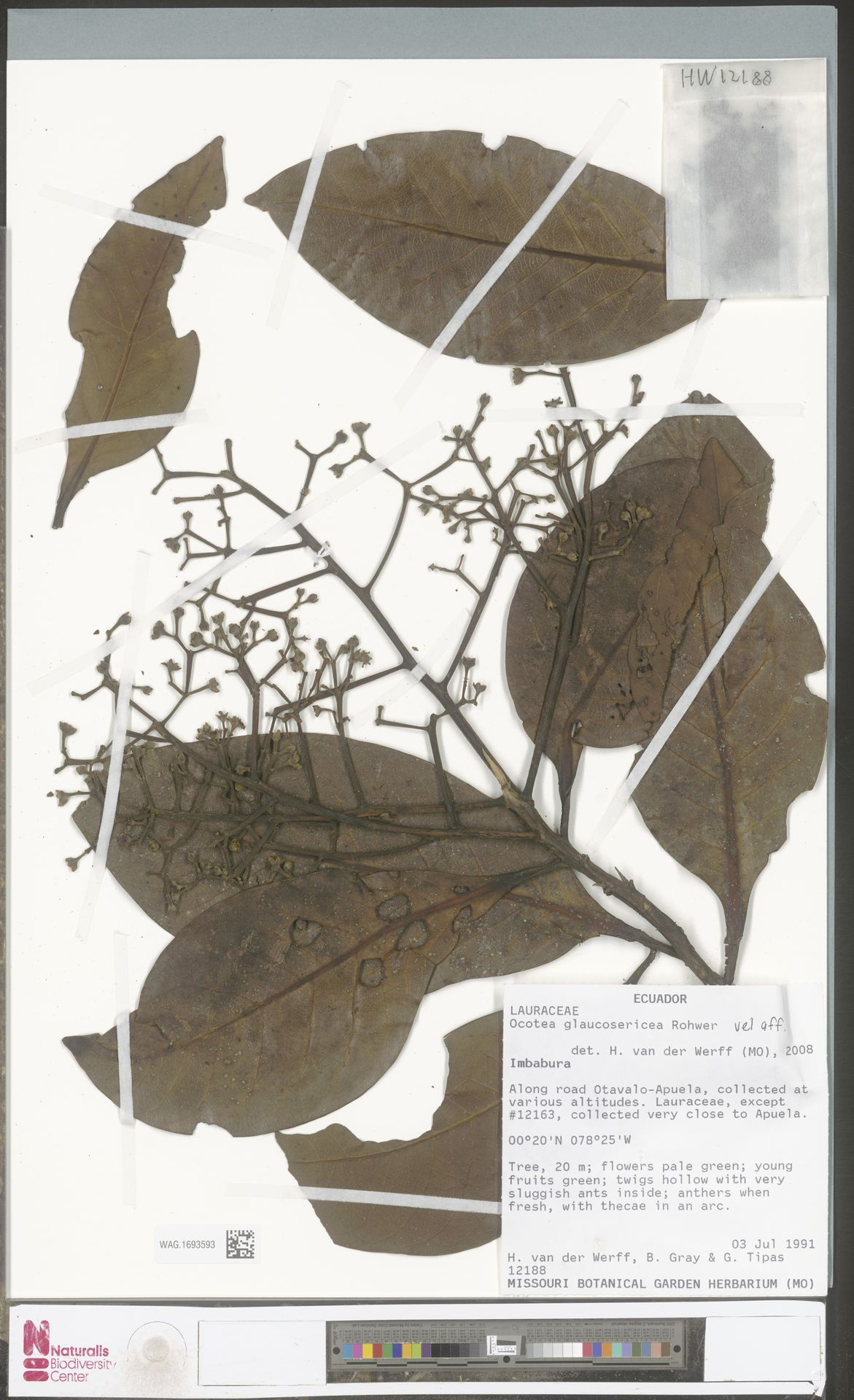

Conservation status
- Least Concern (IUCN 3.1)

Scientific classification
- Kingdom: Plantae
- Clade: Tracheophytes
- Clade: Angiosperms
- Clade: Magnoliids
- Order: Laurales
- Family: Lauraceae
- Genus: Ocotea
- Species: O. glaucosericea

Binomial name
- Ocotea glaucosericea Rohwer

Synonyms
- Nectandra hypoglauca Standl. ex C.K.Allen

= Ocotea glaucosericea =

Species of tree

Ocotea glaucosericea is a species of flowering plant in the family Lauraceae. It is an evergreen tree native to Costa Rica, Panama, Colombia, and Ecuador. It is a medium to large tree which grows 15 to 35 metres tall. It flowers from January to August and December, and fruits from December to June. In Costa Rica and Panama it is native to premontane and montane rain forest, including pluvial or cloud forest, and extending into adjacent lowland rain forest, from (100) 500 to 2,000 metres elevation.
