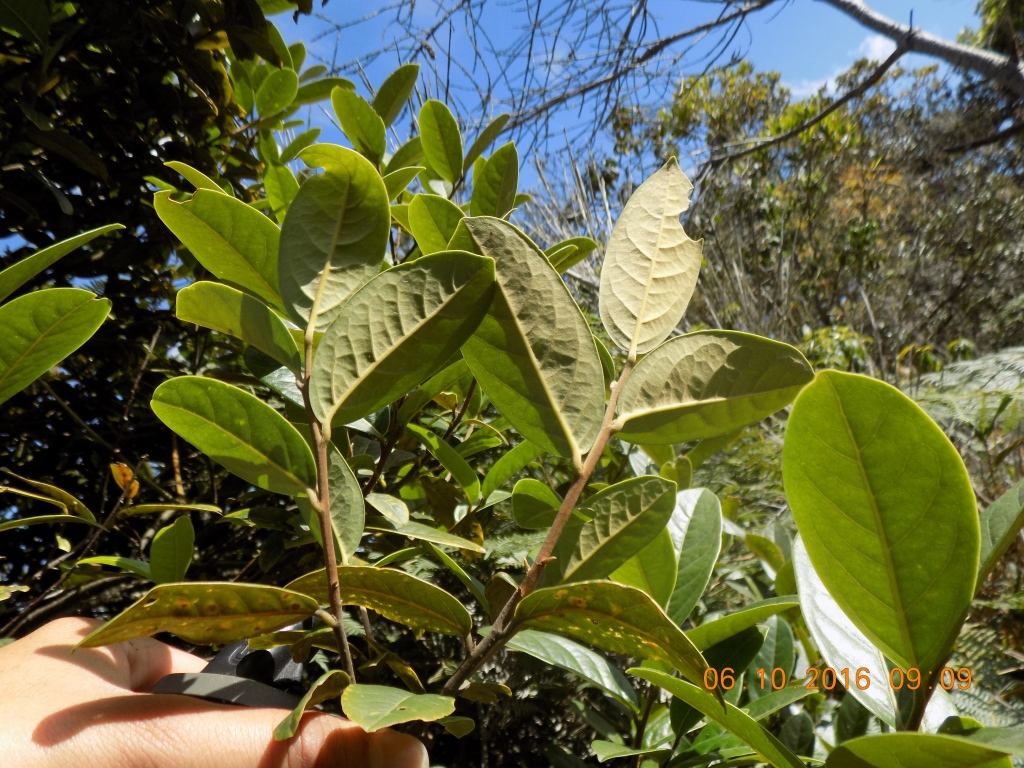

Conservation status
- Least Concern (IUCN 3.1)

Scientific classification
- Kingdom: Plantae
- Clade: Tracheophytes
- Clade: Angiosperms
- Clade: Magnoliids
- Order: Laurales
- Family: Lauraceae
- Genus: Ocotea
- Species: O. heterochroma

Binomial name
- Ocotea heterochroma Mez & Sodiro

Synonyms
- Ocotea otuzcensis O.C.Schmidt

= Ocotea heterochroma =

Species of plant

Ocotea heterochroma is a species of tree in the family Lauraceae. It is native to Colombia, Ecuador, and Peru. The IUCN Red List assesses the species as Least Concern.
