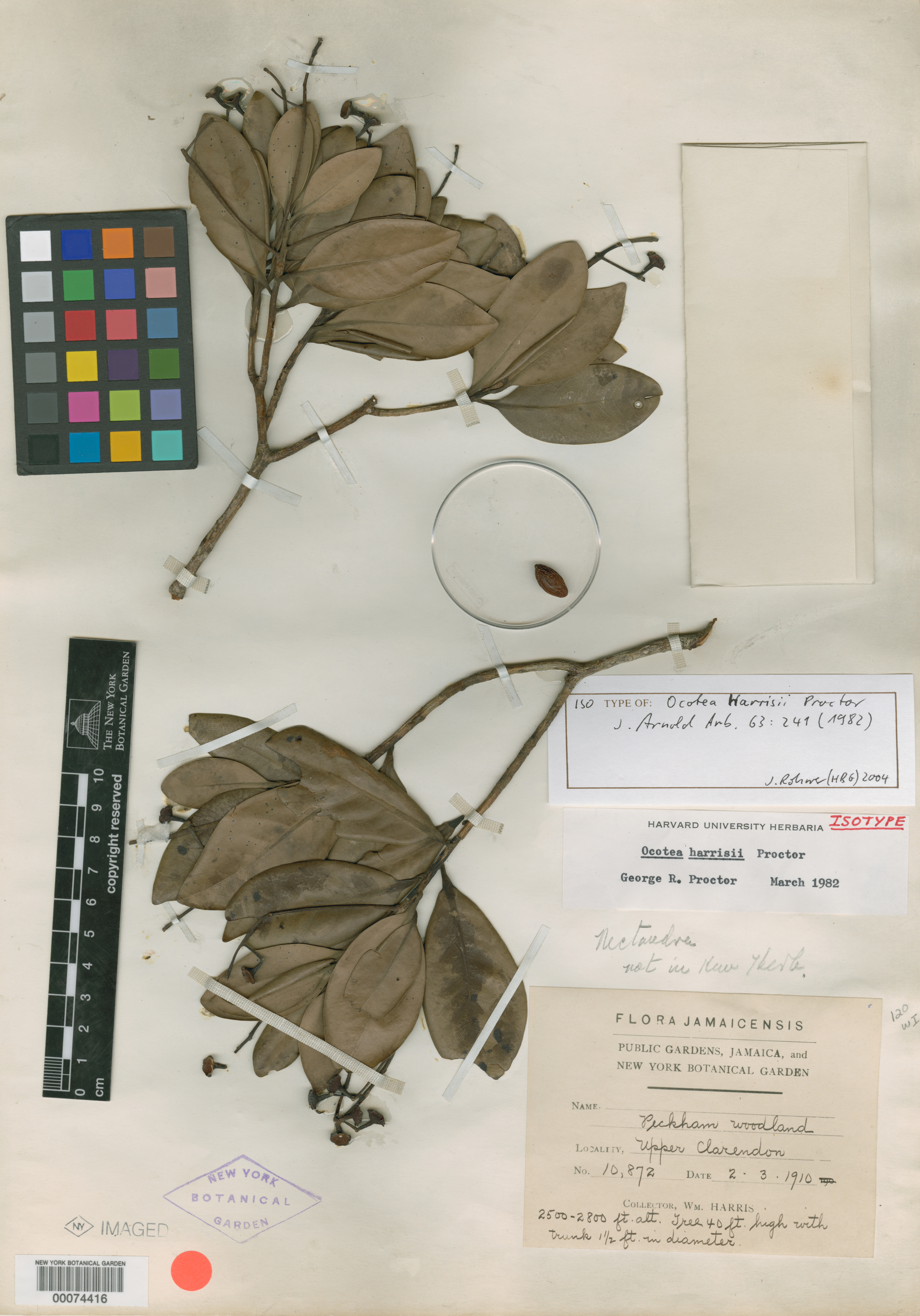

Conservation status
- Critically Endangered (IUCN 3.1)

Scientific classification
- Kingdom: Plantae
- Clade: Tracheophytes
- Clade: Angiosperms
- Clade: Magnoliids
- Order: Laurales
- Family: Lauraceae
- Genus: Ocotea
- Species: O. harrisii

Binomial name
- Ocotea harrisii Proctor

= Ocotea harrisii =

Species of tree

Ocotea harrisii is a species of plant in the genus Ocotea of the family Lauraceae. It is an evergreen tree endemic to Jamaica. It is threatened by habitat loss.
