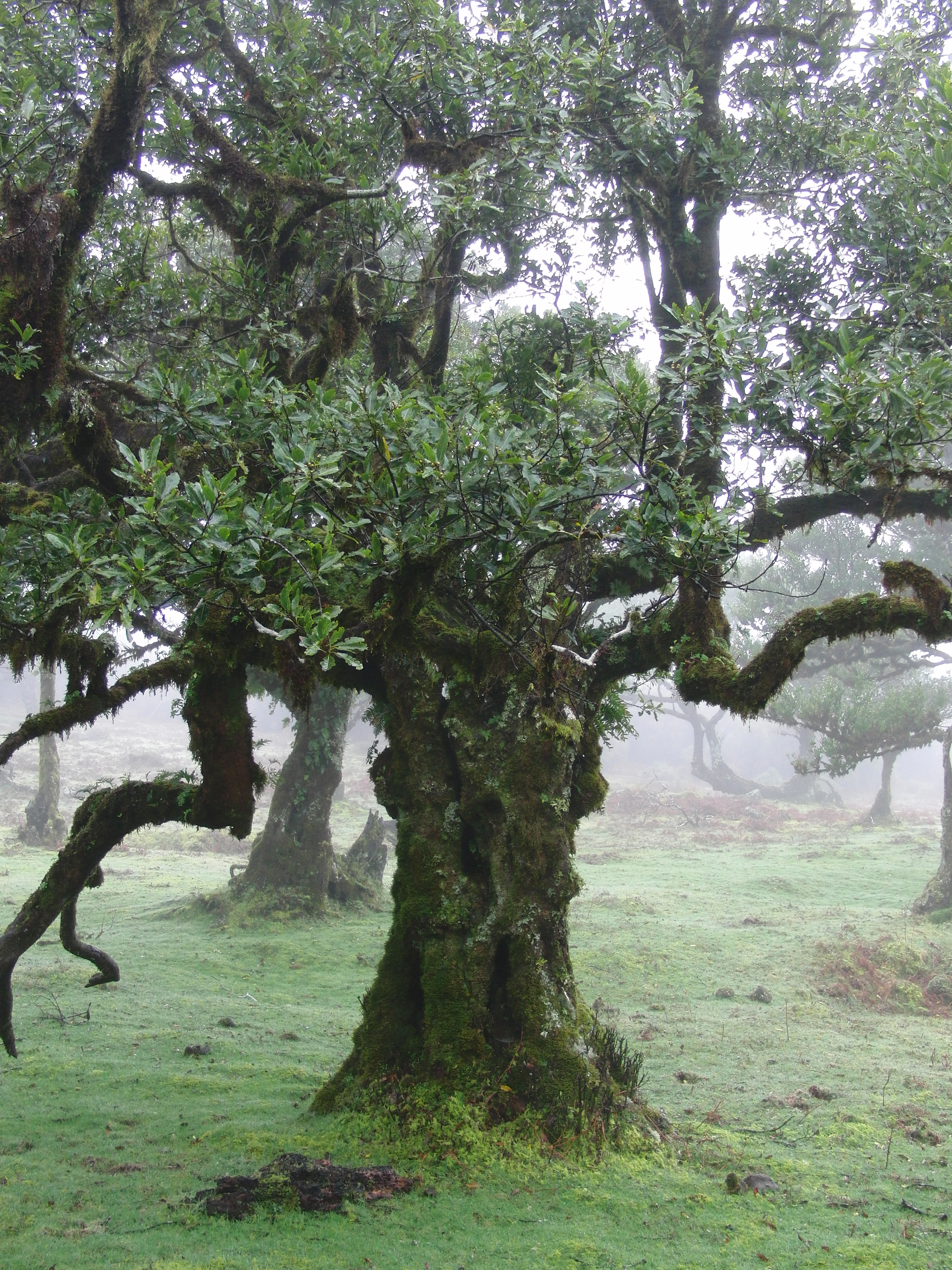
- O. foetens on the highlands of Madeira Island

Scientific classification
- Kingdom: Plantae
- Clade: Embryophytes
- Clade: Tracheophytes
- Clade: Angiosperms
- Clade: Magnoliids
- Order: Laurales
- Family: Lauraceae
- Genus: Ocotea; Aubl.

Species
- Over 520, see List of Ocotea species

Synonyms
- Aperiphracta Nees ex Meisn.; Balanopsis Raf.; Borbonia Adans., nom. illeg.; Calycodaphne Bojer; Camphoromoea Nees; Ceramocarpium Meisn. ex Nees, pro syn.; Ceramophora Nees ex Meisn., not validly publ.; Gymnobalanus Nees & Mart.; Keiria Bowdich; Leptodaphne Nees; Linharia Arruda; Nemodaphne Meisn.; Oreodaphne Nees & Mart.; Petalanthera Nees; Povedadaphne W.C.Burger; Senneberia Neck., opus utique oppr.; Strychnodaphne Nees & Mart.; Teleiandra Nees & Meyen

= Ocotea =

Genus of trees

Ocotea is a genus of flowering plants belonging to the family Lauraceae. Many are evergreen trees with lauroid leaves.

There are over 520 species currently accepted within the genus, distributed mostly in tropical and subtropical areas of the Americas (around 300 species) including the Caribbean and West Indies, but also with some species in Africa, Madagascar and the Mascarene Islands. One species (O. foetens) is native to the Macaronesia (in Canary Islands and Madeira). The genus is suspected to be paraphyletic.

== Description ==
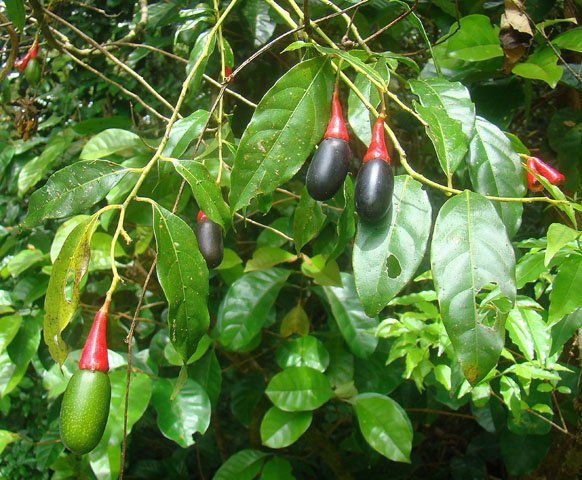
O. tenera leaves and fruit

They are trees or shrubs, occasionally with adventitious roots (O. hartshorniana, O. insularis). Leaves simple, alternate, rarely opposite or whorled. The leaves are lauroid, they are commonly dark green glossy with sometimes brown on the underside and fragrant oil cells.

The African and Madagascan species all have bisexual flowers (possessing both male and female parts), whereas many of the American species have flowers that are unisexual (either male or female). The apetalous flowers are in small panicles.

The fruits are globose or oblong berries, 3–5 cm in length, hard and fleshy and at the junction of the peduncle part with the fruit covered by a cup-shaped, occasionally flat, cupule, giving them an appearance similar to an acorn. The fruit is dark green, gradually darkening with maturity. The cupule at the base of the berry, can be more brightly colored. The fruit has a single seed wrapped in a hard coat and can be slightly lignified.

== Names ==
The genus has no standard common name. Names often refer to the aroma of the wood, which can be strong and not always pleasant. Sweetwood is usually applied only to this genus, although many names are also applied to this genus and other genera:

- Stinkwood can refer to several unrelated trees that have bad-smelling wood. Ocotea bullata is called black stinkwood or true stinkwood, and Ocotea foetens is also called stinkwood.
- Camphorwood is usually Cinnamomum camphora a close relative of Ocotea species.
- Rosewood (Peruvian rosewood, O. cernua) is normally Dalbergia or related members of the family Fabaceae.

The common names of some species refer to their similarity to other Lauraceae such as Sassafras (Brazilian sassafras: O. odorifera) or Laurus (Cape laurel: O. bullata, Sword laurel: O. floribunda, Guaika laurel: O. puberula, etc.).

== Distribution and habitat ==
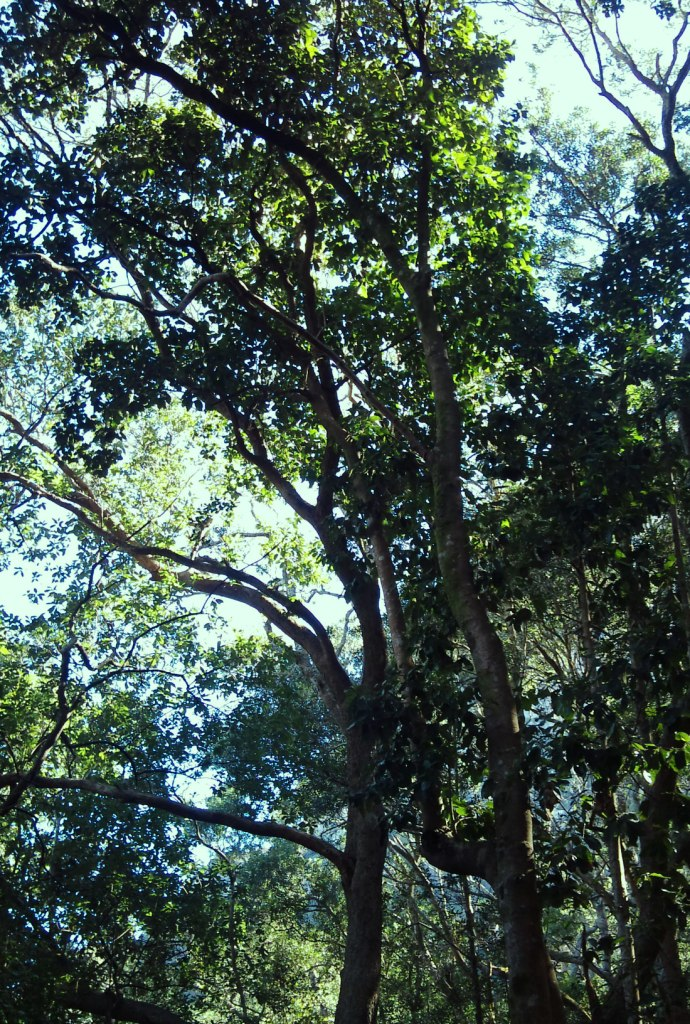
Ocotea bullata on South African Afromontane forests

Most species of Ocotea are distributed across the tropical Americas, from Mexico to Northern Argentina including the West Indies. Species are also found in eastern Africa from South Africa to Ethiopia, in Gabon and Republic of the Congo in Central Africa, and on Madagascar and the Mascarene Islands. One species, Ocotea foetens, is native to the Canary Islands and Madeira in the North Atlantic.

Ocotea species are distributed in subtropical and tropical regions, often at higher elevations. They are characteristic plants of many tropical and subtropical montane forests such as the Araucaria moist forests, Yungas, and Talamancan montane forests in the Americas, Afromontane forests including the Knysna-Amatole montane forests in Africa, and Laurisilva in the Macaronesian islands. In Madagascar and Brazil they also occur in lowland forests.

== Ecology ==
Most relatively small fruit species are of great environmental importance because they are the food of many endemic birds and mammals, especially in Islands, and premontane and montane forests. The leaves of Ocotea species are the food source for the caterpillars of several species of endemic Lepidoptera, including several species of Memphis. Some Memphis caterpillars feed solely on the leaves of one species of Ocotea; for example M. mora feeds only on O. cernua, and M. boisduvali feeds only on O. veraguensis

Seed distribution of some Ocotea species is performed by frugivorous birds such as toucans, the three-wattled bellbird (family Cotingidae), quetzal and Cape parrot. Ocotea fruit is also consumed by several Columbiformes such as Columba trocaz, Delegorgue's pigeon, Bolle's pigeon (Columba bollii), African wood pigeon, and American doves.

Most of the African tree species are ancient paleoendemic species, which in ancient times were widely distributed on the continent. This is not the case in the Americas: 89 species have been collected in Venezuela alone.

Species of Ocotea can be attacked by various rot-inducing root pathogens, including Loweporus inflexibilis, Phellinus apiahynus and Phytophthora cinnamomi.

Some Ocotea species are used as nesting sites by ants, which may live in leaf pockets or in hollowed-out stems. The ants patrol their host plants more frequently in response to disturbance or to the appearance of insect pests such as grasshoppers.

== Uses ==
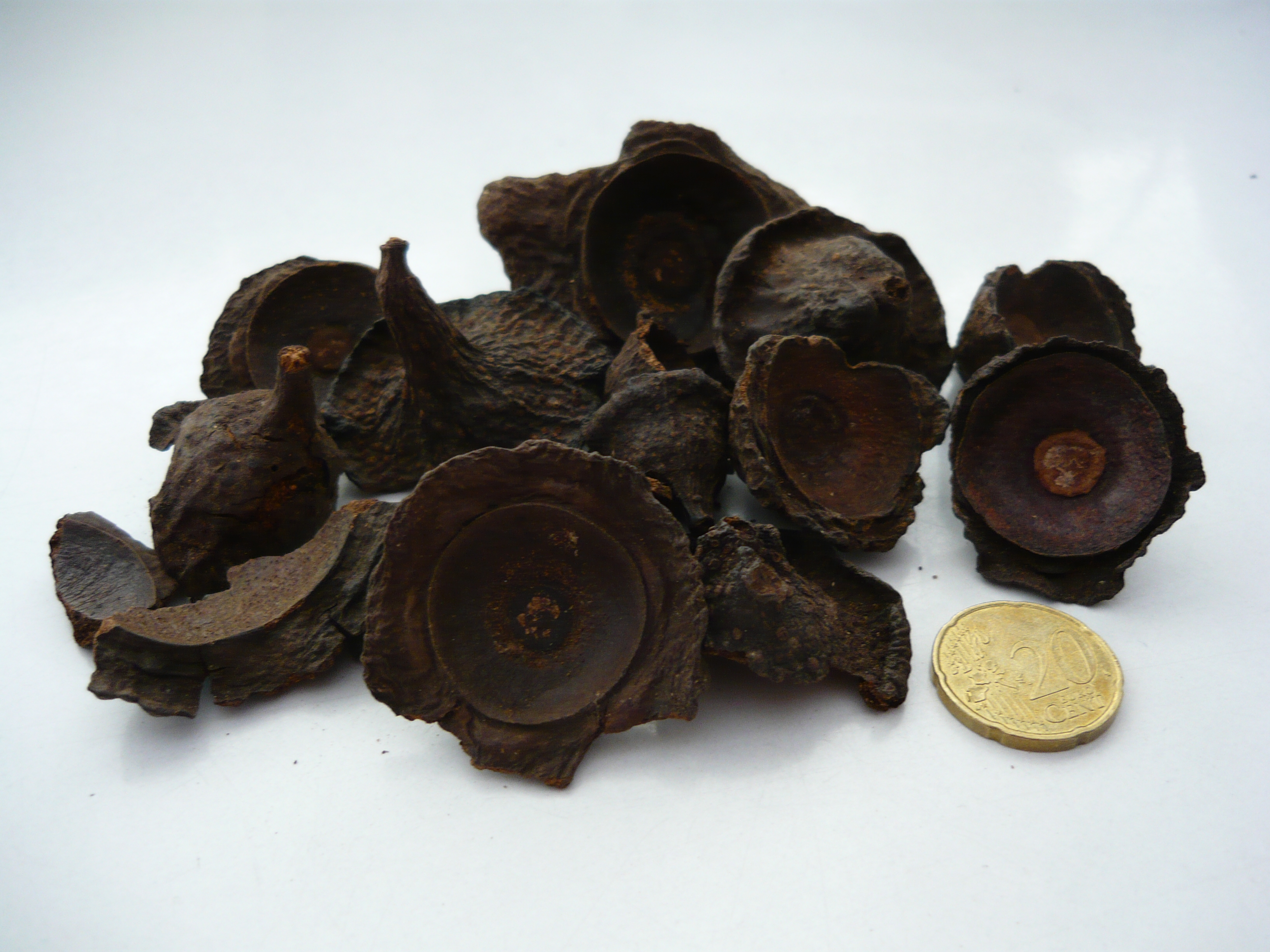
Dried ishpingo (O. quixos) cupules can be used as spice.

Ocotea produce essential oils, which are rich in camphor and safrole. East African camphorwood (O. usambarensis), Peruvian rosewood (O. cernua) and Brazilian sassafras (O. odorifera) are traded internationally.

Dried fruit cupules of ishpingo (O. quixos) are used in Ecuador to flavor beverages, such as colada morada.

Some fast growing Ocotea tree species are harvested commercially for timber. These include O. puberula, O. bullata (black or true stinkwood) and O. usambarensis. The timber is valued for its resistance to fungal decay.

O. odorifera (Brazilian sassafras) and O. kuhlmanni are frequently used as honey plants.

== Selected species ==
The following are some of the species of Ocotea. Distinguishing Ocotea species from Nectandra and other close relatives is problematic. Povedadaphne may be better placed in Ocotea.

- Ocotea aciphylla
- Ocotea acutifolia (Nees) Mez
- Ocotea albida
- Ocotea albopunctulata
- Ocotea amazonica
- Ocotea amplifolia
- Ocotea arnottiana
- Ocotea atirrensis
- Ocotea bangii
- Ocotea basicordatifolia
- Ocotea benthamiana
- Ocotea bofo
- Ocotea bullata – black stinkwood, true stinkwood
- Ocotea camphoromoea
- Ocotea catharinensis
- Ocotea cernua – Peruvian rosewood
- Ocotea clarkei
- Ocotea corymbosa Mez
- Ocotea cuneifolia
- Ocotea cymbarum (often included in O. odorifera)
- Ocotea diospyrifolia (Meisn.) Mez
- Ocotea dispersa (Nees) Mez
- Ocotea divaricata (Nees) Mez
- Ocotea domatiata Mez
- Ocotea fasciculata (Nees) Mez
- Ocotea floribunda
- Ocotea foeniculacea – black sweetwood
- Ocotea foetens – "til", "tilo"
- Ocotea gabonensis
- Ocotea glaucosericea
- Ocotea glaziovii Mez
- Ocotea gracilis
- Ocotea guianensis
- Ocotea harrisii
- Ocotea heterochroma
- Ocotea indecora (Schott) Mez
- Ocotea insularis
- Ocotea illustris
- Ocotea infrafoveolata
- Ocotea jelskii
- Ocotea jorge-escobarii
- Ocotea kenyensis
- Ocotea lancifolia
- Ocotea lancilimba
- Ocotea langsdorffii
- Ocotea leucoxylon – loblolly sweetwood
- Ocotea mandonii
- Ocotea marmellensis
- Ocotea matogrossensis
- Ocotea megaphylla
- Ocotea minarum Mart. ex Nees
- Ocotea monteverdensis – Burger
- Ocotea monzonensis
- Ocotea moschata – nemoca
- Ocotea nemodaphne – laurel sassafras
- Ocotea notata (Nees) Mez
- Ocotea oblonga
- Ocotea obtusata
- Ocotea odorifera – Brazilian sassafras
- Ocotea oocarpa
- Ocotea otuzcensis
- Ocotea pachypoda
- Ocotea pauciflora
- Ocotea porosa
- Ocotea porphyria
- Ocotea portoricensis
- Ocotea prunifolia
- Ocotea puberula
- Ocotea pulchra Vattimo-Gil
- Ocotea quixos – ishpingo
- Ocotea raimondii
- Ocotea rivularis
- Ocotea robertsoniae
- Ocotea rotundata
- Ocotea rubrinervis
- Ocotea rugosa
- Ocotea sericea
- Ocotea silvestris Vattimo-Gil
- Ocotea smithiana
- Ocotea spathulata
- Ocotea spectabilis
- Ocotea spixiana (Nees) Mez
- Ocotea staminoides
- Ocotea tabacifolia (Meisn.) Rohwer
- Ocotea teleiandra (Meisn.) Mez
- Ocotea urbaniana Mez
- Ocotea uxpanapana
- Ocotea vaccinioides Meisn.
- Ocotea velloziana
- Ocotea velutina Mart.
- Ocotea viridiflora
- Ocotea wrightii – Wright's laurel canelon

=== Formerly placed here ===
- Chlorocardium rodiei (bibiru, "greenheart"), as O. rodiei
- Nectandra coriacea ("lancewood"), as O. catesbyana, O. coriacea
- Sextonia rubra, as O. rubra
- Kuloa usambarensis – (East African camphorwood) as O. usambarensis

== Fossil record ==
†Ocotea hradekensis from the early Miocene, has been described from fragmentary fossil leaf compressions that have been found in the Kristina Mine at Hrádek nad Nisou in North Bohemia, the Czech Republic. O. foetens from the Canary Islands is its nearest living relative. Fossil †Ocotea heerii leaf impressions of Messinian age (ca. 5.7 Ma) have been uncovered in Monte Tondo, northern Apennines, Italy.
