= Ocotea jelskii =

Conservation status
- Endangered (IUCN 3.1)

Scientific classification
- Kingdom: Plantae
- Clade: Tracheophytes
- Clade: Angiosperms
- Clade: Magnoliids
- Order: Laurales
- Family: Lauraceae
- Genus: Ocotea
- Species: O. jelskii

Binomial name
- Ocotea jelskii Mez

Species of tree

Ocotea jelskii is a species of tree in the family Lauraceae. It is native to Ecuador and Peru.
