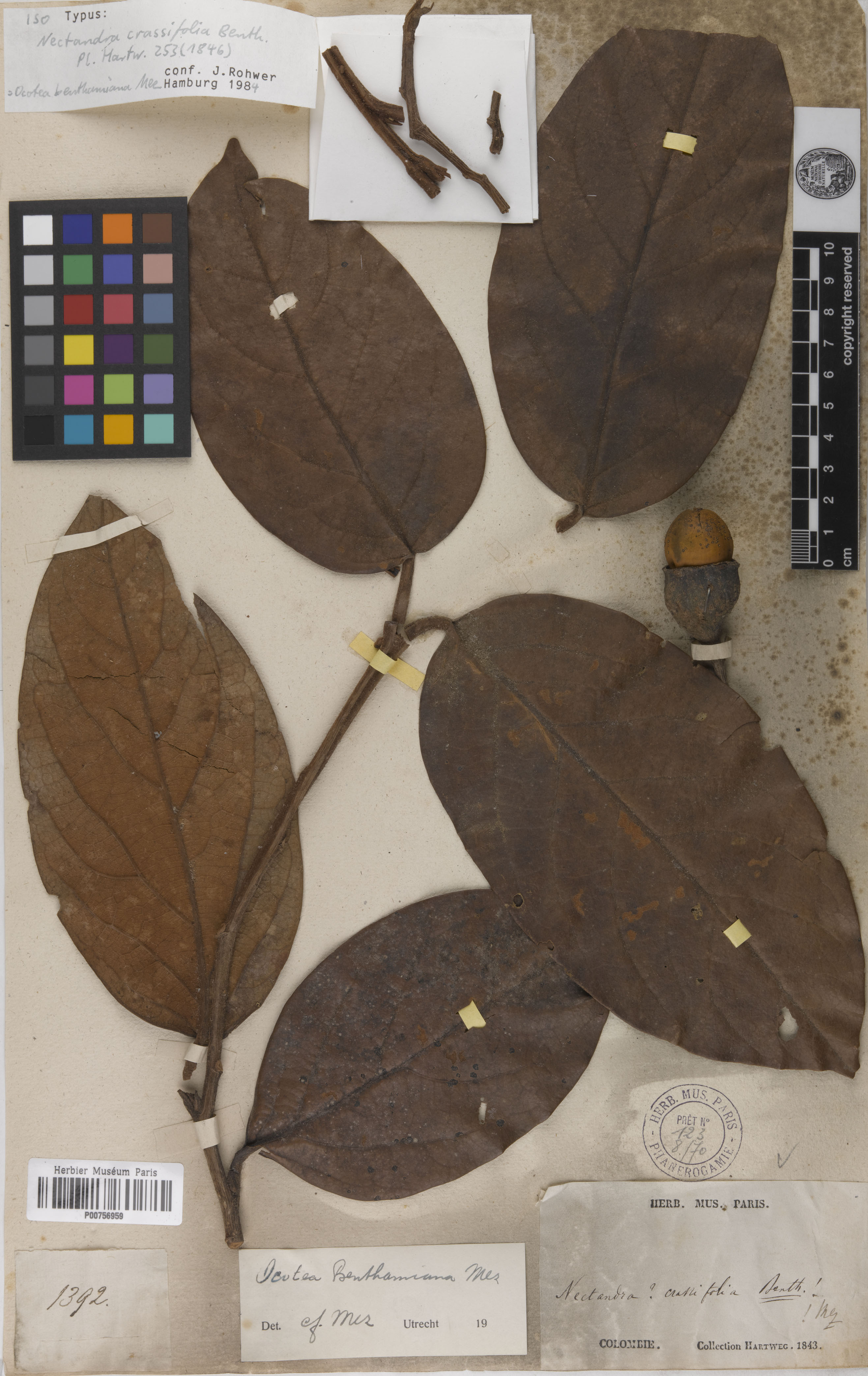

Conservation status
- Least Concern (IUCN 3.1)

Scientific classification
- Kingdom: Plantae
- Clade: Tracheophytes
- Clade: Angiosperms
- Clade: Magnoliids
- Order: Laurales
- Family: Lauraceae
- Genus: Ocotea
- Species: O. benthamiana

Binomial name
- Ocotea benthamiana Mez

Synonyms
- Nectandra crassifolia Benth.

= Ocotea benthamiana =

Species of tree

Ocotea benthamiana is a species of plant in the family Lauraceae. It is a shrub or tree to 15 m tall.

Ocotea benthamiana occurs in mountain forests and shrub lands of northern Peru, Ecuador, and Colombia at elevations of 1,400–3,100 m (4,600–10,200 ft) above sea level. It is exploited for its timber and also used as fuelwood.
