= Ocotea viridiflora =

Conservation status
- Vulnerable (IUCN 3.1)

Scientific classification
- Kingdom: Plantae
- Clade: Tracheophytes
- Clade: Angiosperms
- Clade: Magnoliids
- Order: Laurales
- Family: Lauraceae
- Genus: Ocotea
- Species: O. viridiflora

Binomial name
- Ocotea viridiflora Lundell

Species of tree

Ocotea viridiflora is a species of flowering plant, an evergreen tree in the family Lauraceae. It is native to Costa Rica and Panama.
