= Ocotea cuneifolia =

Conservation status
- Least Concern (IUCN 3.1)

Scientific classification
- Kingdom: Plantae
- Clade: Tracheophytes
- Clade: Angiosperms
- Clade: Magnoliids
- Order: Laurales
- Family: Lauraceae
- Genus: Ocotea
- Species: O. cuneifolia

Binomial name
- Ocotea cuneifolia (Ruiz & Pav.) Mez

Synonyms
- Laurus cuneifolia Ruiz & Pav.; Laurus nitida Dombey ex Nees; Oreodaphne cuneata Nees; Laurus oblongo-obovata Ruiz ex Nees; Oreodaphne oblongo-obovata Nees; Aperiphracta cuneata Nees ex Meisn.; Laurus biflora Pav. ex Meisn.; Ocotea oocarpa Mez & Sodiro; Ocotea cuneata (Nees) J.F.Macbr.; Ocotea raimondii O.C.Schmidt; Ocotea oblongo-obovata (Nees) Rohwer

Species of plant

Ocotea cuneifolia is a species of tree in the family Lauraceae that is native to Colombia, Ecuador, and Peru.

== Distribution and habitat ==
In Colombia it is known from Quindío, in Ecuador it is known from Bolívar, Carchi, Esmeraldas, Imbabura, Napo, and Zamora-Chinchipe, and in Peru it is known from Amazonas, Cajamarca, Cusco, Huánuco, and San Martín. It can be found at elevations of 250–3,000 m (820–9,840 ft) above sea level.

== Description ==
O. cuneifolia is a variable species growing to 35 m (115 ft) tall. The papery leaves are elliptic to obovate-elliptic in shape with a pointed tip and cuneate base, measuring 9–14 cm (3.5–5.5 in) by 3.5–4.5 cm (1.4–1.8 in). The leaf veins are raised, with pit-shaped domatia along the secondary veins. The inflorescence measures 4–9 cm (1.6–3.5 in) long and is somewhat hairy. The staminate flowers measure 5 mm (0.20 in) in diameter and bear nine stamens, while the pistillate flowers measure 2.5 mm (0.098 in) in diameter with a 1.5 mm (0.059 in) long pistil. The flowers may be reddish or yellow-green in colour. The fruits measure 2.5 cm (0.98 in) by 2.2 cm (0.87 in).
