= Ocotea rotundata =

Conservation status
- Vulnerable (IUCN 3.1)

Scientific classification
- Kingdom: Plantae
- Clade: Tracheophytes
- Clade: Angiosperms
- Clade: Magnoliids
- Order: Laurales
- Family: Lauraceae
- Genus: Ocotea
- Species: O. rotundata

Binomial name
- Ocotea rotundata van der Werff

Synonyms
- Ocotea rodundata (lapsus)

Species of tree

Ocotea rotundata is a species of evergreen tree in the genus of plants Ocotea, in the family Lauraceae. It is endemic to Ecuador. Its natural habitat is subtropical or tropical moist montane forests.
