= Ocotea lancilimba =

Conservation status
- Critically Endangered (IUCN 2.3)

Scientific classification
- Kingdom: Plantae
- Clade: Tracheophytes
- Clade: Angiosperms
- Clade: Magnoliids
- Order: Laurales
- Family: Lauraceae
- Genus: Ocotea
- Species: O. lancilimba

Binomial name
- Ocotea lancilimba Kosterm.

Species of tree

Ocotea lancilimba is a species of plant in the family Lauraceae. It is an evergreen tree in the genus Ocotea. It is endemic to Mauritius. Its natural habitat is subtropical or tropical dry forests.
