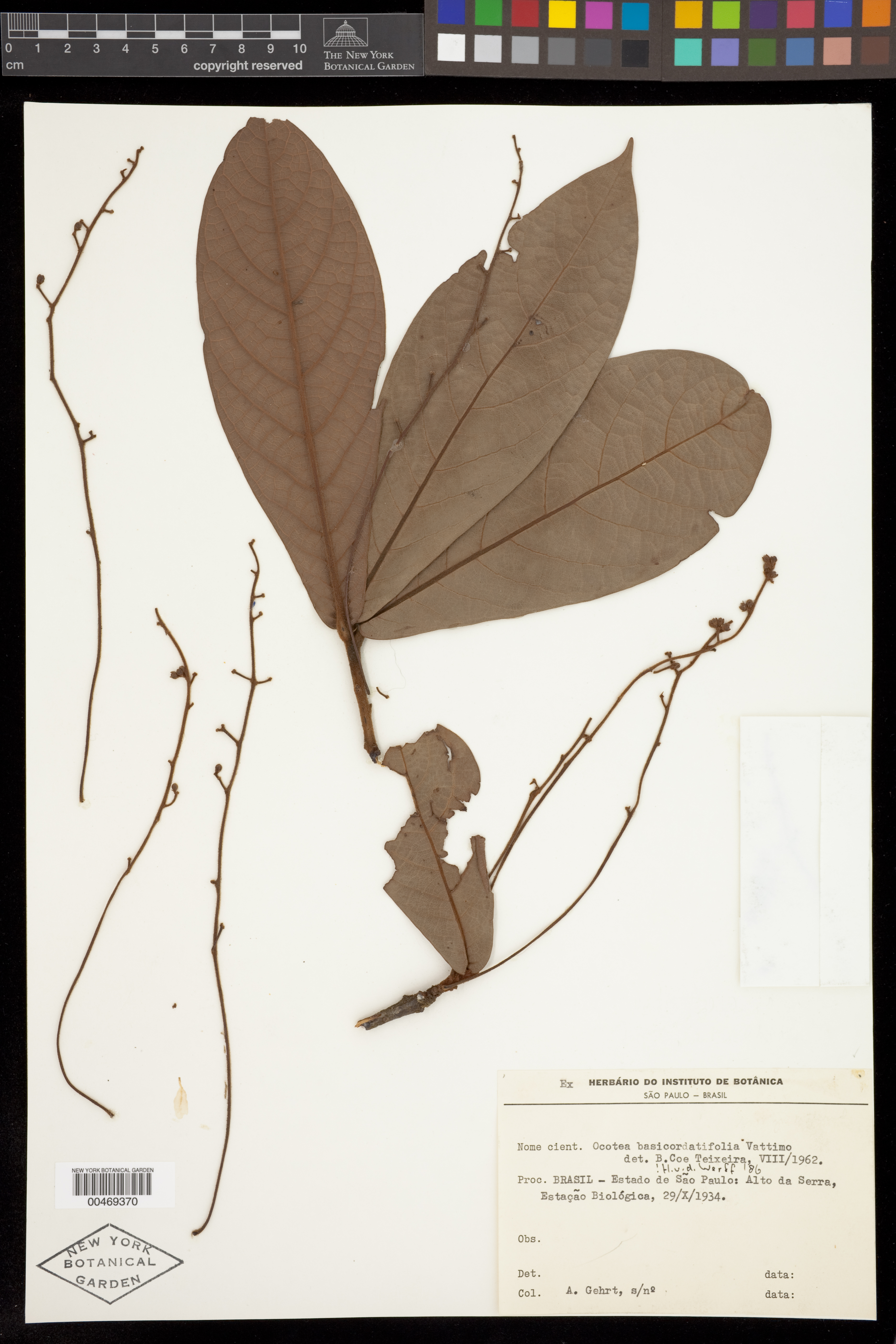

Conservation status
- Endangered (IUCN 3.1)

Scientific classification
- Kingdom: Plantae
- Clade: Tracheophytes
- Clade: Angiosperms
- Clade: Magnoliids
- Order: Laurales
- Family: Lauraceae
- Genus: Ocotea
- Species: O. basicordatifolia

Binomial name
- Ocotea basicordatifolia Vattimo

= Ocotea basicordatifolia =

Species of tree

Ocotea basicordatifolia is a species of Ocotea in the plant family Lauraceae.

== Distribution ==
The tree is endemic to Brazil, in the Santo André area of São Paulo state.

It is native to the Atlantic Forest ecoregion, within the Serra de Paranapiacaba range.

== Conservation ==
Ocotea basicordatifolia is an IUCN Red List endangered species, threatened by industrial pollution and habitat loss.
