= Ocotea moschata =

Conservation status
- Vulnerable (IUCN 3.1)

Scientific classification
- Kingdom: Plantae
- Clade: Tracheophytes
- Clade: Angiosperms
- Clade: Magnoliids
- Order: Laurales
- Family: Lauraceae
- Genus: Ocotea
- Species: O. moschata

Binomial name
- Ocotea moschata (Meisn.) Mez

Synonyms
- Laurus moschata Pav. ex Meisn.; Mespilodaphne moschata Meisn.

Species of plant

Ocotea moschata is a species of tree native to Puerto Rico and northeastern Venezuela. Its vernacular names include nuez moscada, and cimarrona (Spanish) and nemoca and nutget (English). This tree is common in the Toro Negro State Forest of Puerto Rico.
