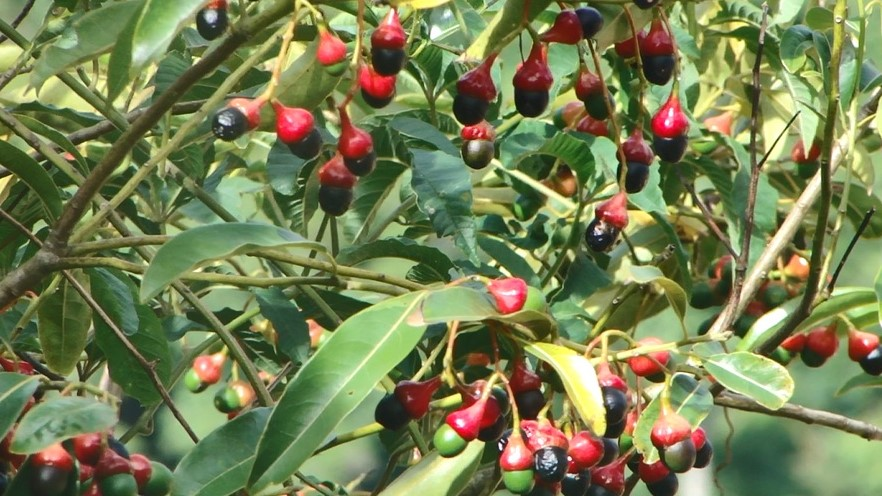

Conservation status
- Least Concern (IUCN 3.1)

Scientific classification
- Kingdom: Plantae
- Clade: Tracheophytes
- Clade: Angiosperms
- Clade: Magnoliids
- Order: Laurales
- Family: Lauraceae
- Genus: Ocotea
- Species: O. puberula

Binomial name
- Ocotea puberula (Rich.) Nees

Synonyms
- Synonymy: Gymnobalanus perseoides Meisn.; Laurus puberula Rich. (1792) (basionym); Myrcia schaueriana O.Berg; Myrtus dioica Spreng.; Ocotea arechavaletae Mez; Ocotea baturitensis Vattimo-Gil; Ocotea martiniana (Nees) Mez; Ocotea paraensis Coe-Teix.; Ocotea paranapiacabensis Coe-Teix.; Ocotea puberula var. arechavaletae (Mez) Hassl.; Ocotea puberula var. truncata (Meisn.) Mez; Ocotea pyramidata S.F.Blake ex Brandegee; Ocotea subglabra Benoist; Ocotea ucayalensis O.C.Schmidt; Oreodaphne acutifolia var. latifolia Nees; Oreodaphne hostmanniana Miq.; Oreodaphne martiniana Nees; Oreodaphne martiniana var. dubia Meisn.; Oreodaphne martiniana var. latifolia Meisn.; Oreodaphne martiniana var. opaca Meisn.; Oreodaphne perseoides Nees ex Meisn.; Oreodaphne warmingii Meisn.; Persea marginata Bartl. ex Meisn.; Persea richardiana Schltdl. & Cham.; Strychnodaphne puberula (Rich.) Nees & Mart.; Strychnodaphne puberula var. angustata Meisn.; Strychnodaphne puberula var. truncata Meisn.

= Ocotea puberula =

Species of plant

Ocotea puberula is a species of flowering plant in genus Ocotea of the family Lauraceae. It is an evergreen tree native to the tropical Americas, ranging through tropical Mexico and from Costa Rica and Panama through tropical South America to northern Argentina. It grows in moist lowland and montane tropical and subtropical forests up to 1,600 meters elevation.

The species was first described as Laurus puberula by Louis Claude Richard in 1792. In 1836 Christian Gottfried Daniel Nees von Esenbeck placed it in genus Ocotea as Ocotea puberula.
