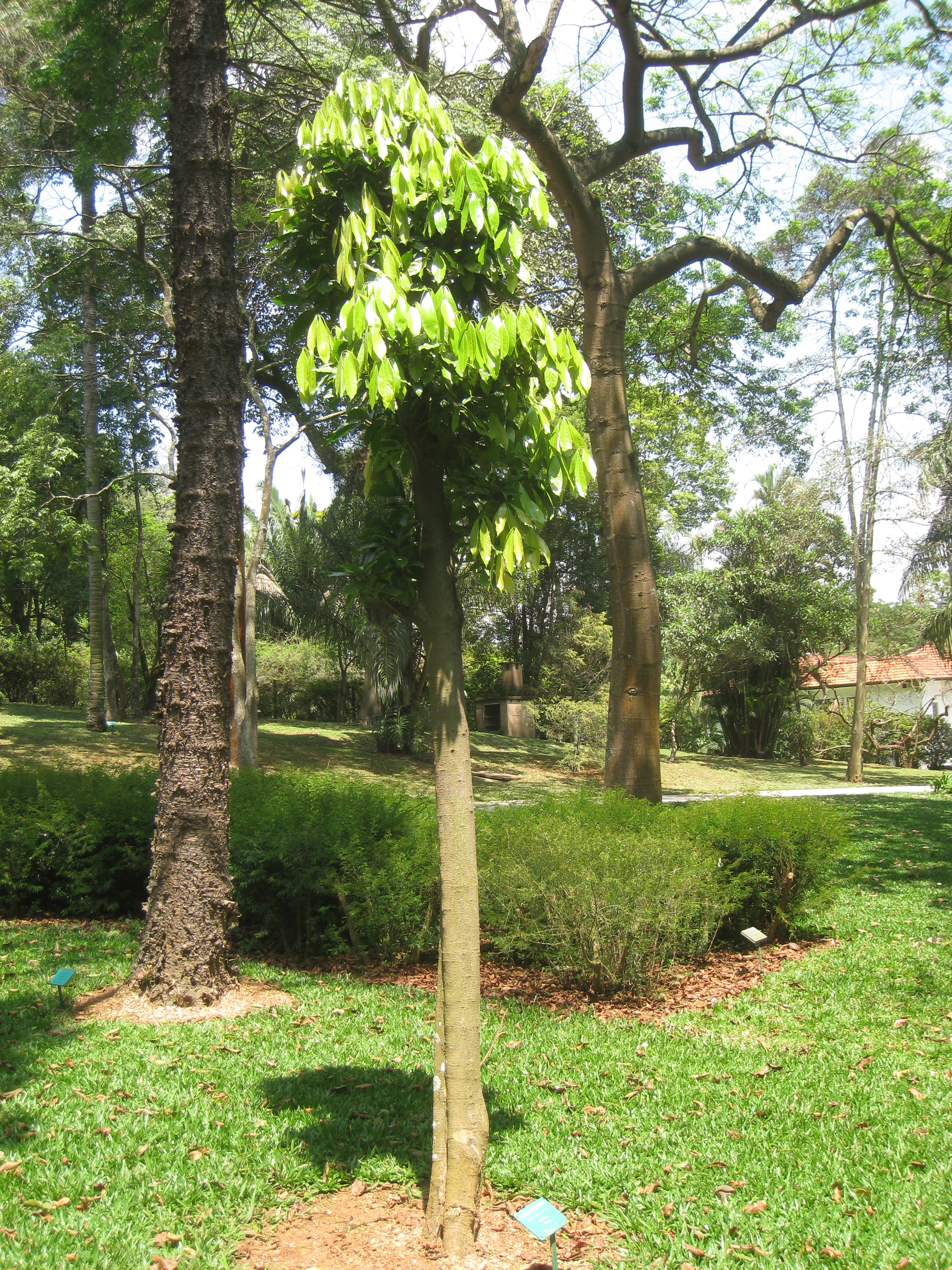

Conservation status
- Vulnerable (IUCN 2.3)

Scientific classification
- Kingdom: Plantae
- Clade: Tracheophytes
- Clade: Angiosperms
- Clade: Magnoliids
- Order: Laurales
- Family: Lauraceae
- Genus: Ocotea
- Species: O. odorifera

Binomial name
- Ocotea odorifera (Vell.) Rohwer

Synonyms
- Ocotea pretiosa (Nees) Mez

= Ocotea odorifera =

Brazilian sassafras

Species of tree

Ocotea odorifera is a species of plant in the family Lauraceae. It is an evergreen tree in the genus Ocotea.

It is commonly known as Brazilian sassafras or American cinnamon; though it is not a true sassafras nor a true cinnamon, these plants are close relatives. In trade, the junior synonym Ocotea pretiosa is often used, and there is considerable confusion between the present taxon and Ocotea cymbarum.

== Distribution ==
It is native to Brazil, in the states of Bahia, Minas Gerais, Paraná, Rio de Janeiro, Rio Grande do Sul, Santa Catarina, and São Paulo.

It may also be native to Misiones province of Argentina and to Paraguay, but is unverified there.

It is threatened by habitat loss.

== Gallery ==
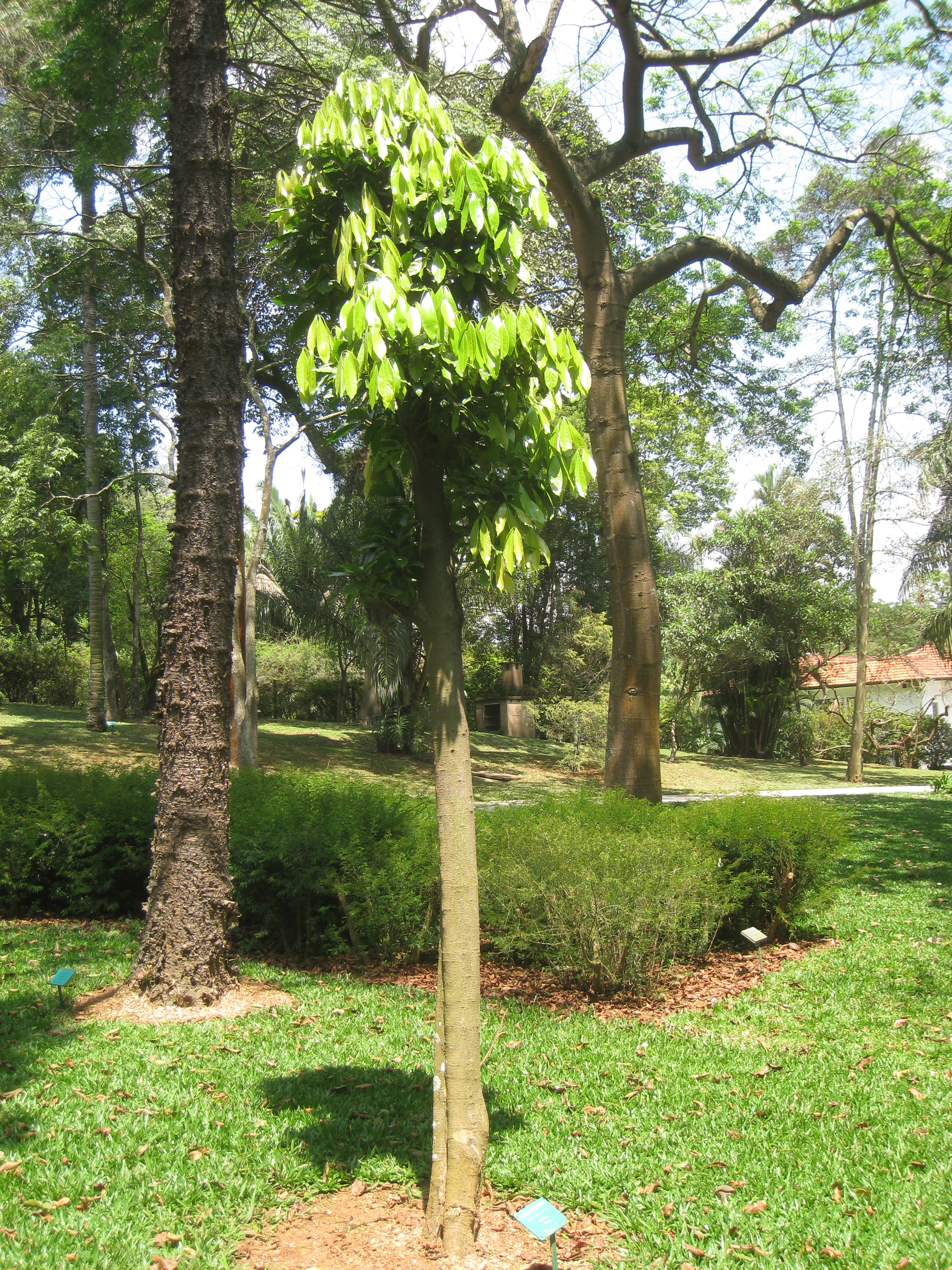
Tree

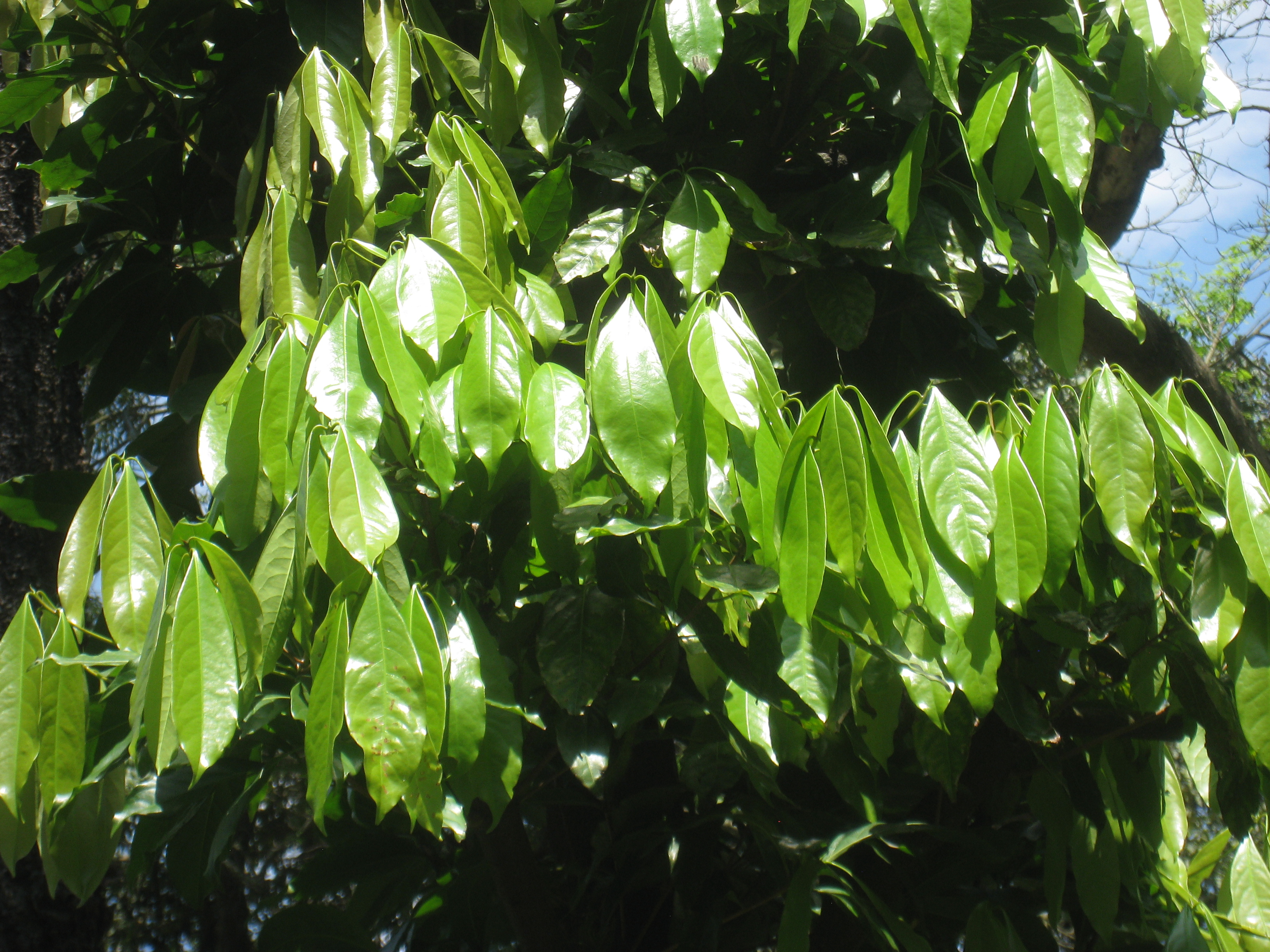
Leaves

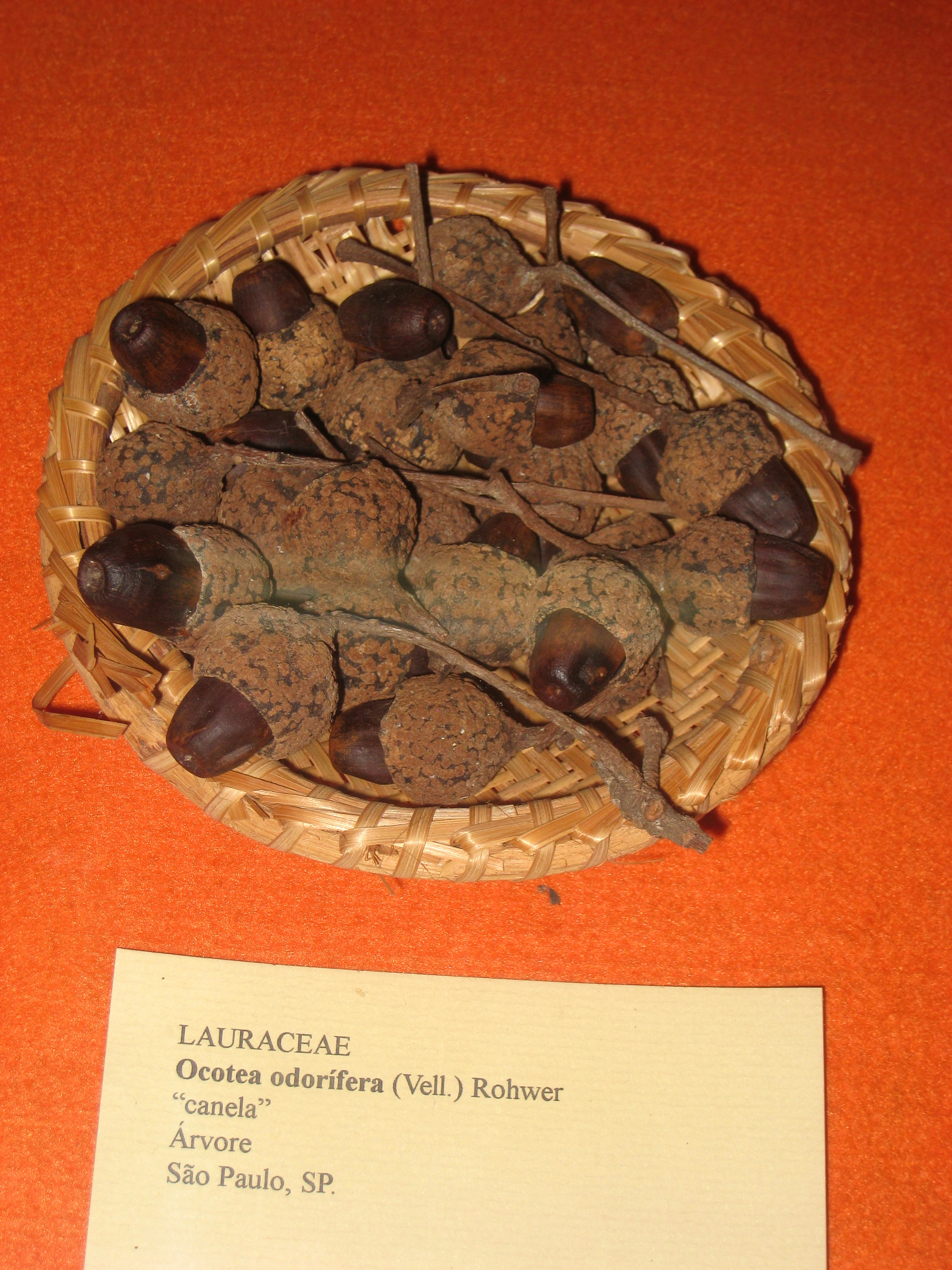
Seeds
