= Ocotea langsdorffii =

Conservation status
- Least Concern (IUCN 3.1)

Scientific classification
- Kingdom: Plantae
- Clade: Tracheophytes
- Clade: Angiosperms
- Clade: Magnoliids
- Order: Laurales
- Family: Lauraceae
- Genus: Ocotea
- Species: O. langsdorffii

Binomial name
- Ocotea langsdorffii (Meisn.) Mez

Synonyms
- Ocotea ensifolia Taub.; Oreodaphne langsdorffii Meisn.

Species of tree

Ocotea langsdorffii is a species of flowering plant in the family Lauraceae.

It is an evergreen tree in the genus Ocotea.

== Distribution ==
It is endemic to Minas Gerais state in Brazil.

It occurs within the Cerrado ecoregion, in low densities in a restricted area of the Serra do Cipó mountain range.

== Conservation ==
It is an IUCN Red List Least Concern species, threatened by habitat loss. It is also included on the official list of threatened Brazilian plants compiled by IBAMA.

Trees are indiscriminately cut for timber, at levels of exploitation that are unsustainable. Minas Gerais state laws to protect species populations within Serra do Cipó State Botanical Park are not well enforced yet.
