= Sweetwood =

Sweetwood is a common name for several plants and may refer to:

- Laurus nobilis, native to the Mediterranean region
- Myrospermum susanum
- Nectandra
- Ocotea
- Oreodaphne leucoxylon
