= William Carl Burger =

American botanist

- Born: 1932 (age 93–94)
- Citizenship: United States
- Education: Columbia University (BA); Cornell University (MSc); Washington University in St. Louis (PhD)
- Scientific career
- Fields: Botany
- Workplaces: Field Museum of Natural History

William Carl Burger (born 1932) is an American botanist known for his contributions to the Costa Rican flora. Burger described 104 plant species, primarily in the Lauraceae and Moraceae.

Burger received a B.A. from Columbia University in 1953, an M.Sc. from Cornell University in 1958 and a Ph.D. from Washington University in St. Louis in 1961. He served as Chair of the Botany Department at the Field Museum.

== Works ==
- 2006. Flowers: How They Changed the World. Ed. Prometheus Books. ISBN 1-59102-407-2
- 2002. Perfect Planet, Clever Species: How Unique Are We?. Ed. Prometheus Books. 345 pp. ISBN 1-59102-016-6
- 1997. Flora Costaricensis
