= List of the largest genera of flowering plants =

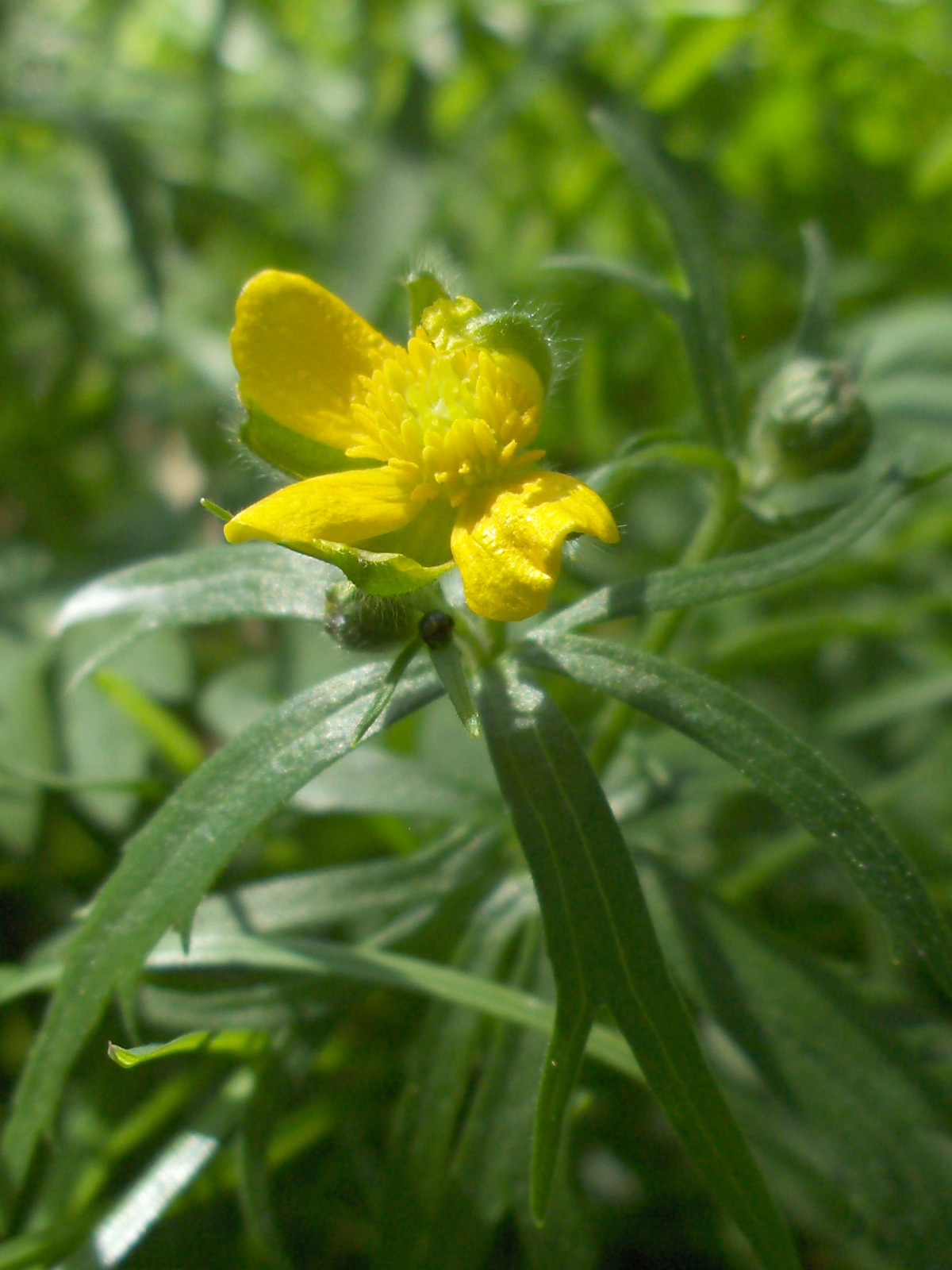
Agamospecies in the Ranunculus auricomus complex help to swell the number of species in the genus Ranunculus.

There are over 80 genera of flowering plants estimated to contain at least 500 described species. The largest of these is currently the legume genus Astragalus (milk-vetches), with over 3,000 species.

The sizes of plant genera vary widely from those containing a single species to genera containing thousands of species, and this disparity became clear early in the history of plant classification. The largest genus in Carl Linnaeus' seminal Species Plantarum was Euphorbia, with 56 species; Linnaeus believed that no genus should contain more than 100 species.

Part of the disparity in genus sizes is attributable to historical factors. According to a hypothesis published by Max Walters in 1961, the size of plant genera is related to the age, not of the taxon itself, but of the concept of the taxon in the minds of taxonomists. Plants which grew in Europe, where most of the early taxonomy was based, were therefore divided into relatively small genera, while those from the tropics were grouped into much larger and more heterogeneous genera. Likewise, plants which shared common medicinal properties, such as the many species of Euphorbia, were united into a single genus, while plants of diverse uses, such as the grasses, were split into many genera. Where there were many classical names for groups of plants, such as in Apiaceae / Umbelliferae or Brassicaceae / Cruciferae, small genera were defined, whereas groups not subdivided by classical authors remained as larger genera, such as Carex. A number of biological factors also influence the number of species. For instance, the occurrence of apomixis allows the recognition of large numbers of agamospecies, and such taxa have helped to bolster genera such as Ranunculus and Potentilla.

The introduction of infrageneric taxa (such as the subgenus, section and series) in the 19th century by botanists including Augustin Pyrame de Candolle allowed the retention of large genera that would otherwise have become unwieldy. E. J. H. Corner believed that studying large genera might enable greater insights into evolutionary biology, and he concentrated his efforts on large tropical genera such as Ficus.

== Largest genera ==
As of 2023, there are a total of 86 genera of flowering plants with at least 500 species. It is clear that there are other genera with over 500 species, as the work of taxonomists continues. Currently, the number of species included in many genera is very different (e.g. see Psychotria), so their ranking is subject to changes. The actual number of species is also imprecisely known because of different approaches of taxonomists, and many of the genera have not been the subject of recent monographs. For instance, estimates of the number of species in the orchid genus Pleurothallis range from 1,120 to 2,500. Genera from some other groups of vascular plants (like pteridophytes), which have similarly large numbers of species, include Selaginella, Asplenium and Cyathea.

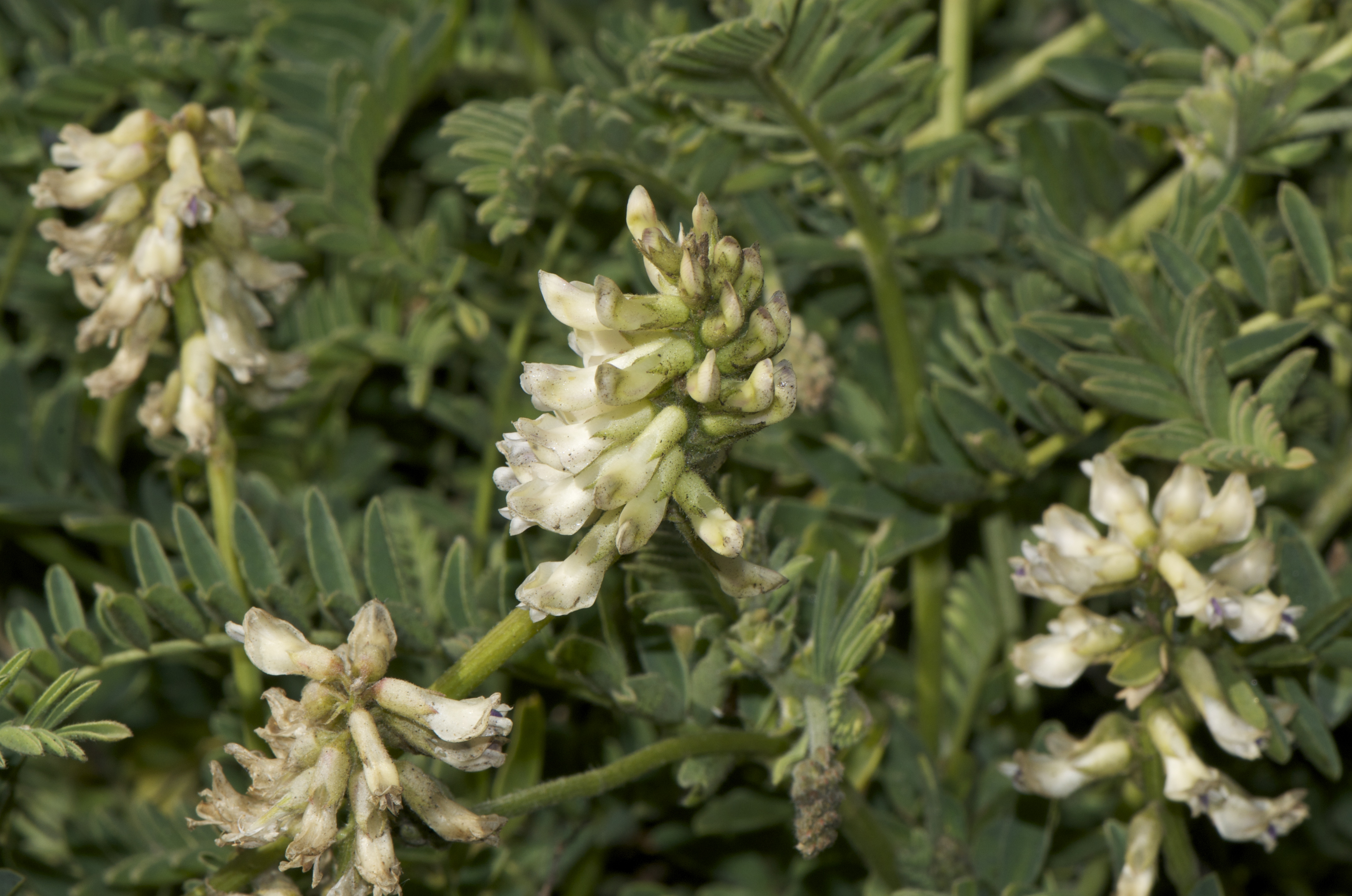
Astragalus is the largest flowering plant genus, with more than 3,200 species, including Astragalus agnicidus.

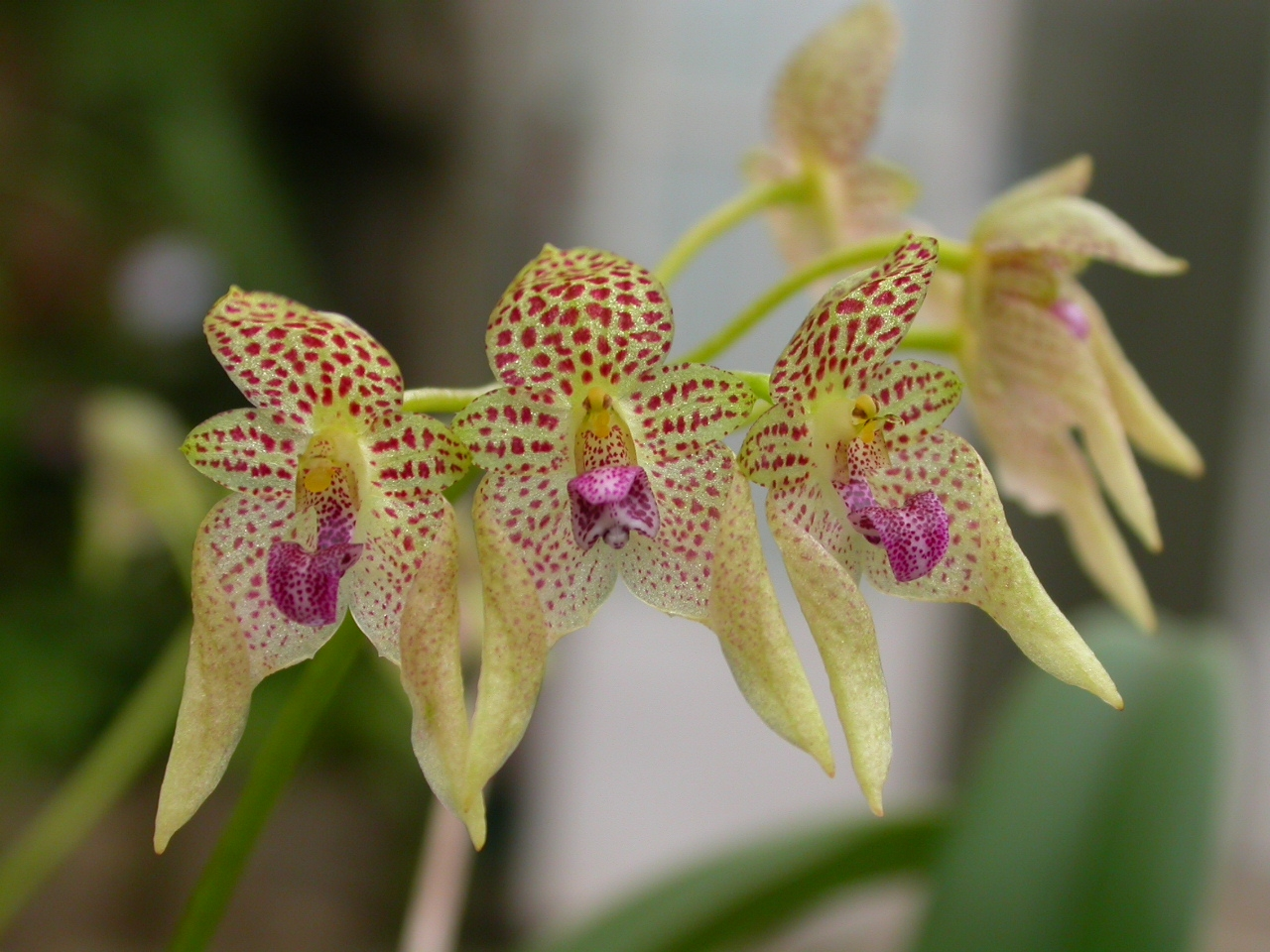
Bulbophyllum is the second largest flowering plant genus, with more than 2,000 species, including Bulbophyllum guttulatum.

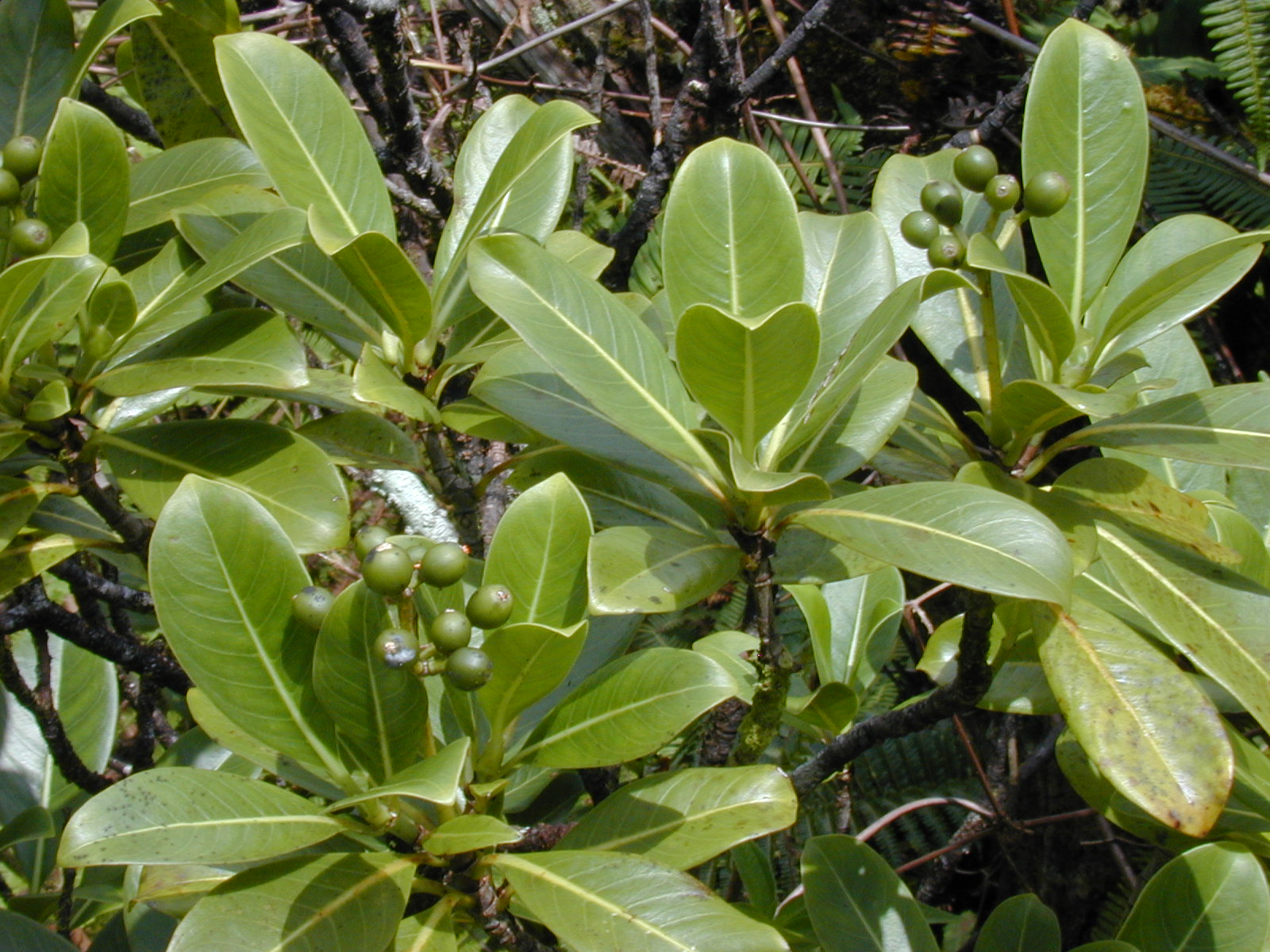
Psychotria is the third largest flowering plant genus, with more than 1,900 species, including Psychotria mariniana.

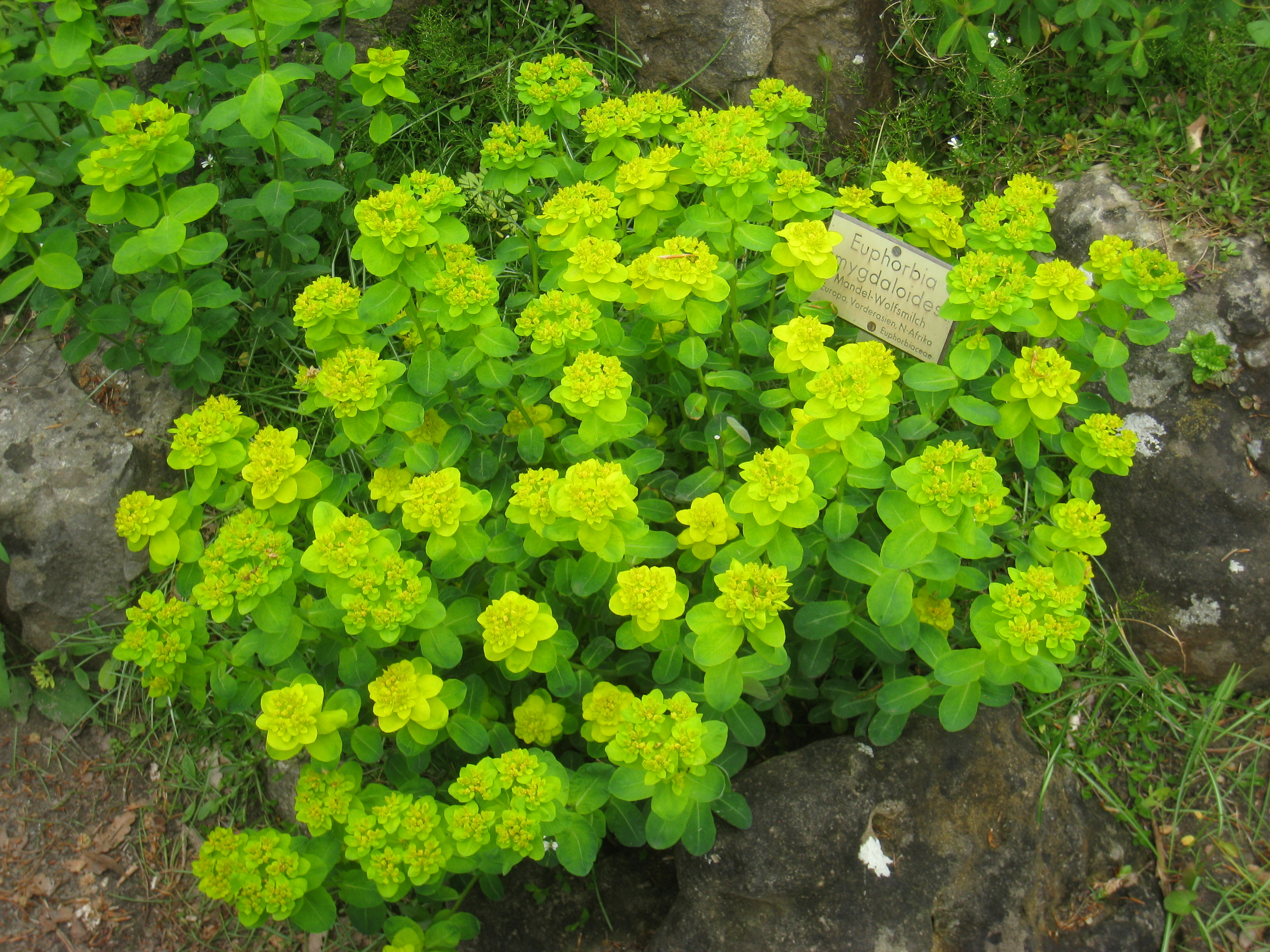
Euphorbia is the fourth largest flowering plant genus, with more than 1,800 species, including Euphorbia amygdaloides.

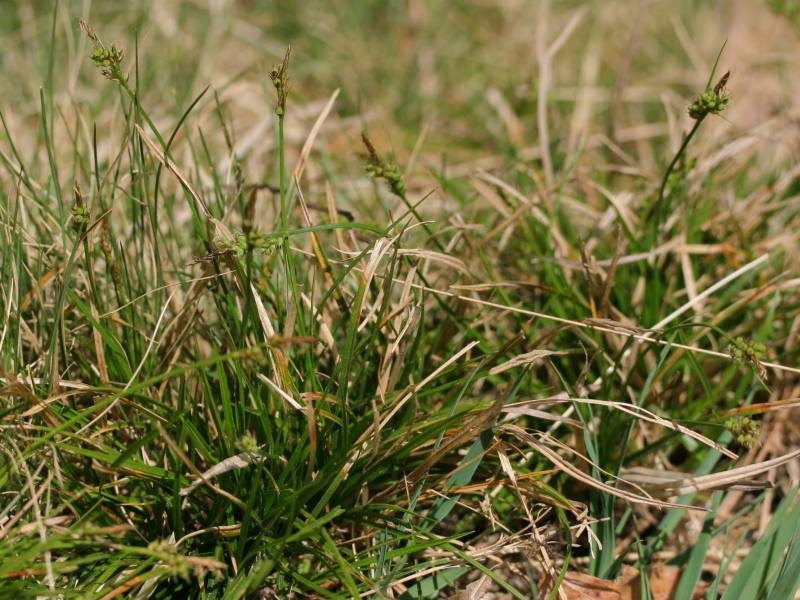
Carex is the fifth largest flowering plant genus, with more than 1,700 species, including Carex pilulifera.

Genera of flowering plants with at least 500 species in 2023
Rank	Genus	Species	Family	Species list
1	Astragalus	3,239	Fabaceae	List of Astragalus species
2	Taraxacum	2,387	Asteraceae	List of Taraxacum species
3	Hieracium	2,349	Asteraceae	List of Hieracium species
4	Carex	2,328	Cyperaceae	List of Carex species
5	Bulbophyllum	2,190	Orchidaceae	List of Bulbophyllum species
6	Piper	2,169	Piperaceae	List of Piper species
7	Euphorbia	2,157	Euphorbiaceae	List of Euphorbia species
8	Begonia	2,144	Begoniaceae	List of Begonia species
9	Miconia	1,939	Melastomataceae	List of Miconia species
10	Epidendrum	1,872	Orchidaceae	List of Epidendrum species
11	Rubus	1,732	Rosaceae	List of Rubus species
12	Senecio	1,681	Asteraceae	List of Senecio species
13	Psychotria	1,650	Rubiaceae	List of Psychotria species
14	Dendrobium	1,647	Orchidaceae	List of Dendrobium species
15	Ranunculus	1,616	Ranunculaceae	List of Ranunculus species
16	Peperomia	1,384	Piperaceae	List of Peperomia species
17	Anthurium	1,346	Araceae	List of Anthurium species
18	Stelis	1,338	Orchidaceae	List of Stelis species
19	Eugenia	1,284	Myrtaceae	List of Eugenia species
20	Solanum	1,238	Solanaceae	List of Solanum species
21	Syzygium	1,236	Myrtaceae	List of Syzygium species
22	Acacia	1,234	Fabaceae	List of Acacia species
23	Rhododendron	1,195	Ericaceae	List of Rhododendron species
24	Lepanthes	1,189	Orchidaceae	List of Lepanthes species
25	Croton	1,178	Euphorbiaceae	List of Croton species
26	Salvia	1,049	Lamiaceae	List of Salvia species
27	Phyllanthus	1,025	Phyllanthaceae	List of Phyllanthus species
28	Impatiens	1,002	Balsaminaceae	List of Impatiens species
29	Justicia	983	Acanthaceae	List of Justicia species
30	Allium	970	Amaryllidaceae	List of Allium species
31	Cyperus	961	Cyperaceae	List of Cyperus species
32	Habenaria	908	Orchidaceae	List of Habenaria species
33	Ficus	876	Moraceae	List of Ficus species
34	Eucalyptus	865	Myrtaceae	List of Eucalyptus species
35	Erica	853	Ericaceae	List of Erica species
36	Myrcia	820	Myrtaceae	List of Myrcia species
37	Centaurea	793	Asteraceae	List of Centaurea species
38	Diospyros	787	Ebenaceae	List of Diospyros species
39	Indigofera	787	Fabaceae	List of Indigofera species
40	Vaccinium	785	Ericaceae	List of Vaccinium species
41	Crotalaria	760	Fabaceae	List of Crotalaria species
42	Cyrtandra	749	Gesneriaceae	List of Cyrtandra species
43	Alchemilla	734	Rosaceae	List of Alchemilla species
44	Viola	727	Violaceae	List of Viola species
45	Verbascum	724	Scrophulariaceae	List of Verbascum species
46	Vernonia	723	Asteraceae	List of Vernonia species
47	Ardisia	721	Primulaceae	List of Ardisia species
48	Pedicularis	711	Orobanchaceae	List of Pedicularis species
49	Cousinia	709	Asteraceae	List of Cousinia species
50	Mimosa	689	Fabaceae	List of Mimosa species
51	Palicourea	689	Rubiaceae	
52	Festuca	686	Poaceae	List of Festuca species
53	Tillandsia	678	Bromeliaceae	List of Tillandsia species
54	Galium	678	Rubiaceae	List of Galium species
55	Polygala	673	Polygalaceae	List of Polygala species
56	Maxillaria	658	Orchidaceae	List of Maxillaria species
57	Masdevallia	656	Orchidaceae	List of Masdevallia species
58	Oxytropis	654	Fabaceae	List of Oxytropis species
59	Elatostema	652	Urticaceae	
60	Lupinus	650	Fabaceae	List of Lupinus species
61	Dioscorea	649	Dioscoreaceae	
62	Salix	629	Salicaceae	List of Salix species
63	Berberis	628	Berberidaceae	
64	Quercus	627	Fagaceae	List of Quercus species
65	Aloe	623	Asphodelaceae	List of Aloe species
66	Ipomoea	621	Convolvulaceae	List of Ipomoea species
67	Poa	617	Poaceae	List of Poa species
68	Pilea	613	Urticaceae	List of Pilea species
69	Pandanus	605	Pandanaceae	List of Pandanus species
70	Ilex	596	Aquifoliaceae	List of Ilex species
71	Coelogyne	595	Orchidaceae	List of Coelogyne species
72	Helichrysum	580	Asteraceae	List of Helichrysum species
73	Philodendron	569	Araceae	List of Philodendron species
74	Ixora	566	Rubiaceae	List of Ixora species
75	Passiflora	561	Passifloraceae	List of Passiflora species
76	Saxifraga	561	Saxifragaceae	List of Saxifraga species
77	Oxalis	557	Oxalidaceae	List of Oxalis species
78	Pleurothallis	556	Orchidaceae	List of Pleurothallis species
79	Primula	553	Primulaceae	List of Primula species
80	Ocotea	545	Lauraceae	List of Ocotea species
81	Corydalis	528	Papaveraceae	List of Corydalis species
82	Aristolochia	524	Aristolochiaceae	List of Aristolochia species
83	Artemisia	523	Asteraceae	List of Artemisia species
84	Hypericum	517	Hypericaceae	List of Hypericum species
85	Potentilla	505	Rosaceae	List of Potentilla species
86	Delphinium	503	Ranunculaceae	List of Delphinium species
