= List of Cousinia species =

The following species in the flowering plant genus Cousinia are recognised by Plants of the World Online. They are morphologically very similar to members of the burdock genus Arctium, but differ in their chromosome numbers.

- Cousinia abbreviata Tscherneva
- Cousinia acanthoblephara Rech.f. & Gilli
- Cousinia acanthodendron Rech.f. & Podlech
- Cousinia acanthostephana Rech.f.
- Cousinia acrodroma Tscherneva
- Cousinia actinacantha Rech.f.
- Cousinia actinia Boiss.
- Cousinia adenophora Juz.
- Cousinia adenostegia Rech.f.
- Cousinia adenosticta Bornm.
- Cousinia adnata Bunge
- Cousinia affinis Schrenk
- Cousinia afghanica C.Winkl.
- Cousinia agelocephala Tscherneva
- Cousinia aggregata DC.
- Cousinia agridaghensis Tugay, Ertugrul & Ulukus
- Cousinia aintabensis Boiss. & Hausskn.
- Cousinia aitchisonii C.Winkl.
- Cousinia alaica Juz. ex Tscherneva
- Cousinia alata Schrenk
- Cousinia albertoregelia C.Winkl.
- Cousinia albescens C.Winkl. & Strauss
- Cousinia albida DC.
- Cousinia albiflora (Bornm. & Sint.) Bornm.
- Cousinia alepideae Boiss.
- Cousinia aleppica Boiss.
- Cousinia alexeenkoana Bornm.
- Cousinia alfredii Bornm. & Gauba
- Cousinia algurdina Rech.f.
- Cousinia aligudarzensis Attar & Ghahr.
- Cousinia allolepis Tscherneva & Vved.
- Cousinia alpina Bunge
- Cousinia ambigens Juz.
- Cousinia amicorum Tscherneva, Joharchi & F.Ghahrem.
- Cousinia ammophila Rech.f.
- Cousinia amoena C.Winkl.
- Cousinia andarabensis Rech.f.
- Cousinia × androssowii Juz.
- Cousinia angrenii Juz.
- Cousinia angusticeps Juz.
- Cousinia annua C.Winkl.
- Cousinia anoplophylla
- Cousinia antonowi C.Winkl.
- Cousinia apiculata Tscherneva
- Cousinia aptera Aitch. & Hemsl.
- Cousinia arachnoidea Fisch. & C.A.Mey. ex DC.
- Cousinia arakensis Attar & Djavadi
- Cousinia araneosa DC.
- Cousinia araneotexta Rech.f.
- Cousinia araxena Takht.
- Cousinia archibaldii Rech.f.
- Cousinia arctotidifolia Bunge
- Cousinia ardalensis Attar & Djavadi
- Cousinia arenaria Bunge
- Cousinia argentea Mehregan & Assadi
- Cousinia ariana Bornm.
- Cousinia arida C.Winkl.
- Cousinia armena Takht.
- Cousinia aspera (Kult.) Karmysch.
- Cousinia assadii Attar
- Cousinia assyriaca Jaub. & Spach
- Cousinia astracanica (Spreng.) Tamamsch.
- Cousinia × atripurpurea Juz.
- Cousinia atrobracteata Attar
- Cousinia atropatana Bunge
- Cousinia attariae Assadi & Joharchi
- Cousinia aucheri DC.
- Cousinia auriculata Boiss.
- Cousinia austrojordanica F.G.Davies & Boulos
- Cousinia autranii C.Winkl.
- Cousinia azerbaidjanica Djavadi, Attar & Najafi
- Cousinia azmarensis S.A.Ahmad, Rastegar & Attar
- Cousinia baberi Boiss.
- Cousinia bachtiarica Boiss. & Hausskn.
- Cousinia badghysi Kult.
- Cousinia balchanica Tscherneva
- Cousinia baluchistanica Rech.f.
- Cousinia bamianica Rech.f. & Köie
- Cousinia baranovii Tscherneva
- Cousinia barbeyi C.Winkl.
- Cousinia barezica Assadi
- Cousinia batalinii C.Winkl.
- Cousinia bazoftensis Attar
- Cousinia beauverdiana Bornm.
- Cousinia beckeri Trautv.
- Cousinia belangeri DC.
- Cousinia bicolor Freyn & Sint.
- Cousinia bienerti Bunge
- Cousinia bijarensis Rech.f.
- Cousinia bipinnata Boiss.
- Cousinia birandiana Hub.-Mor.
- Cousinia blepharobasis Rech.f. & Gilli
- Cousinia bobekii Rech.f.
- Cousinia bobrovii Juz.
- Cousinia boissieri Buhse
- Cousinia bonvaleti Franch.
- Cousinia botschantzevii Juz. ex Tscherneva
- Cousinia boyerahmadica Rastegar, Attar & Mirtadz.
- Cousinia brachyptera DC.
- Cousinia brevicaulis Attar, Mozaff. & Mirtadz.
- Cousinia bucharica C.Winkl.
- Cousinia bungeana Regel & Schmalh.
- Cousinia buphthalmoides Regel
- Cousinia butkovii Tschern. & Vved.
- Cousinia caesarea Boiss. & Balansa
- Cousinia caespitosa C.Winkl.
- Cousinia calcitrapa Boiss.
- Cousinia calcitrapella Bornm.
- Cousinia calocephala Jaub. & Spach
- Cousinia calolepis Boiss.
- Cousinia calva Juz.
- Cousinia campylaraphis Tschern.
- Cousinia × cana Juz.
- Cousinia candicans Juz.
- Cousinia candolleana Jaub. & Spach
- Cousinia canescens DC.
- Cousinia carduncelloidea Regel & Schmalh.
- Cousinia caroli-henrici Attar & Ghahr.
- Cousinia carthamoides Aitch. & Hemsl.
- Cousinia cataonica Boiss. & Hausskn.
- Cousinia catenata Rech.f.
- Cousinia cavarae Bornm.
- Cousinia centauroides Fisch. & C.A.Mey.
- Cousinia ceratophora Kult.
- Cousinia chaetocephala Kult.
- Cousinia chamaepeuce Boiss.
- Cousinia chejrabadensis Kult.
- Cousinia chionophila Rech.f. & Köie
- Cousinia chitralensis Rech.f.
- Cousinia chlorocephala C.A.Mey. ex DC.
- Cousinia chlorosphaera Bornm.
- Cousinia chlorothyrsa Rech.f. & Köie
- Cousinia chrysacantha Jaub. & Spach
- Cousinia chrysandra Bornm. & Gauba
- Cousinia chrysantha Kult.
- Cousinia chrysochlora Rech.f. & Köie
- Cousinia cirsioides Boiss. & Balansa
- Cousinia cisdarvasica V.Nikitin
- Cousinia coerulea Kult. ex Tschern.
- Cousinia commutata Bunge
- Cousinia concinna Boiss. & Hausskn.
- Cousinia concolor Bunge
- Cousinia congesta Bunge
- Cousinia consanguinea (Bornm.) Rech.f.
- Cousinia contumax C.Winkl. & Bornm.
- Cousinia cordifolia Djavadi & Attar
- Cousinia coronata Franch.
- Cousinia corymbosa C.Winkl.
- Cousinia crassipes Kult.
- Cousinia crispa Jaub. & Spach
- Cousinia cryptadena Juz.
- Cousinia curvibracteata Mehregan
- Cousinia cylindracea Boiss.
- Cousinia cylindrocephala Jaub. & Spach
- Cousinia cynaroides C.A.Mey.
- Cousinia czatkalica Tscherneva
- Cousinia czerniakowskae Kult.
- Cousinia dalahuensis Attar & Ghahr.
- Cousinia daralaghezica Takht.
- Cousinia darwasica C.Winkl.
- Cousinia dasylepis Kult.
- Cousinia davisiana Hub.-Mor.
- Cousinia dayi Post
- Cousinia decipiens Boiss. & Buhse
- Cousinia decolorans Freyn & Sint.
- Cousinia decumbens Rech.f.
- Cousinia decurrens Regel
- Cousinia decurrentifolia Juz. ex Tscherneva
- Cousinia deluensis Attar, Mozaff. & Mirtadz.
- Cousinia denaensis Attar & Djavadi
- Cousinia deserti Bunge
- Cousinia dichotoma Bunge
- Cousinia dichromata Kult.
- Cousinia diezii Rech.f.
- Cousinia dimoana Kult.
- Cousinia dipterocarpa Bornm. & Rech.f.
- Cousinia discolor Bunge
- Cousinia dissecta Kar. & Kir.
- Cousinia dissectifolia Kult.
- Cousinia divaricata C.Winkl.
- Cousinia dolichoclada Juz.
- Cousinia dolicholepis Schrenk
- Cousinia dshisakensis Kult.
- Cousinia dubia Popov
- Cousinia eburnea Bornm.
- Cousinia ecbatanensis Bornm.
- Cousinia echinocephala Sennikov
- Cousinia edmondsonii Rech.f.
- Cousinia egens Juz.
- Cousinia elburzensis Attar, Mahdigholi & Ghahr.
- Cousinia eleonorae Hub.-Mor.
- Cousinia elephantina Rech.f.
- Cousinia elwendensis Bornm.
- Cousinia elymaitica Attar, Mozaff. & Mirtadz.
- Cousinia erectispina Tscherneva
- Cousinia erinacea Jaub. & Spach
- Cousinia eriobasis Bunge
- Cousinia eriophylla (Kult.) Bornm.
- Cousinia eriorrhiza Bornm.
- Cousinia eriotricha Juz.
- Cousinia erivanensis Bornm.
- Cousinia ermenekensis Hub.-Mor.
- Cousinia eryngioides Boiss.
- Cousinia esfandiarii Rech.f. & Aellen
- Cousinia euchlora Bornm. & Rech.f.
- Cousinia eugenii Kult.
- Cousinia euphratica Hub.-Mor.
- Cousinia eurylepis Rech.f.
- Cousinia fabrorum Rech.f.
- Cousinia falcinella Bornm.
- Cousinia falconeri Hook.f.
- Cousinia fallax C.Winkl.
- Cousinia farimanensis Assadi
- Cousinia farsistanica Bornm.
- Cousinia fascicularis Juz.
- Cousinia fedorovii Takht.
- Cousinia ferghanensis Bornm.
- Cousinia ferruginea Kult.
- Cousinia fetissowi C.Winkl.
- Cousinia finitima Juz.
- Cousinia firuzkuhensis
- Cousinia foliosa Boiss. & Balansa
- Cousinia fragilis C.Winkl. & Bornm.
- Cousinia fragillima Rech.f.
- Cousinia franchetii C.Winkl.
- Cousinia fraternella Bornm.
- Cousinia freitagii Rech.f.
- Cousinia freynii Bornm. & Sint.
- Cousinia fursei Rech.f.
- Cousinia gabrielae Bornm.
- Cousinia gaharensis Attar & Djavadi
- Cousinia gatchsaranica Mehregan, Assadi & Attar
- Cousinia gaubae Bornm.
- Cousinia gedrosiaca Bornm. & Gauba
- Cousinia ghahremanii Mirtadz. & Attar
- Cousinia ghorana Rech.f.
- Cousinia gigantolepis Rech.f.
- Cousinia gigantoptera Rech.f. & Podlech
- Cousinia gilanica Bornm.
- Cousinia gilliatii Rech.f.
- Cousinia glabriseta Kult.
- Cousinia glandulosa Kult.
- Cousinia glaphyra Rech.f. & Köie
- Cousinia glaphyrocephala Juz. ex Tscherneva
- Cousinia glaucopsis Bornm. & Rech.f.
- Cousinia glochidiata Kult.
- Cousinia gmelinii C.Winkl.
- Cousinia gnezdilloi Tschern.
- Cousinia gomolitzkii Juz. ex Tscherneva
- Cousinia gontscharowii Juz.
- Cousinia gracilis Boiss.
- Cousinia graminifolia Rech.f.
- Cousinia grandis C.A.Mey. ex DC.
- Cousinia grantii Rech.f.
- Cousinia greuteri Rech.f.
- Cousinia griffithiana Boiss.
- Cousinia grigoriewii Juz.
- Cousinia grisea Kult.
- Cousinia gulczensis Kult.
- Cousinia gymnoclada Rech.f. & Köie
- Cousinia hablitzii C.A.Mey. ex DC.
- Cousinia haeckeliae Bornm.
- Cousinia hakkarica Hub.-Mor.
- Cousinia halysensis Hub.-Mor.
- Cousinia hamadae Juz.
- Cousinia hamadanensis Rech.f.
- Cousinia hamosa C.A.Mey. ex DC.
- Cousinia harazensis Rech.f.
- Cousinia hastifolia C.Winkl.
- Cousinia haussknechtii C.Winkl.
- Cousinia hazarensis Mirtadz. & Attar
- Cousinia hedgei Rech.f.
- Cousinia hemsleyana C.Winkl.
- Cousinia hergtiana Bornm.
- Cousinia hermonis Boiss.
- Cousinia × heterogenetos Bornm.
- Cousinia heteroloba Rech.f.
- Cousinia heterophylla Boiss.
- Cousinia hilariae Kult.
- Cousinia hohenackeri Fisch. & C.A.Mey.
- Cousinia hololeuca Bunge
- Cousinia hoplites Bornm.
- Cousinia hoplophylla Tschern.
- Cousinia horrida Kult.
- Cousinia humilis Boiss.
- Cousinia × hybrida Rech.f.
- Cousinia hymenostephanus (Rech.f.) Podlech
- Cousinia hypochionea Bornm.
- Cousinia hypoleuca Boiss.
- Cousinia hypopolia Bornm. & Sint.
- Cousinia hystricocephala Sennikov
- Cousinia iconica Hub.-Mor.
- Cousinia ilicifolia Jaub. & Spach
- Cousinia iljinii Takht.
- Cousinia immitans Rech.f.
- Cousinia immitantiformis Rech.f.
- Cousinia incompta DC.
- Cousinia inflata Boiss. & Hausskn.
- Cousinia infundibularis Rech.f.
- Cousinia insignis Rech.f.
- Cousinia integrifolia Franch.
- Cousinia intermedia C.A.Mey. ex DC.
- Cousinia intertexta Freyn & Sint.
- Cousinia iranshahriana Attar & Maroofi
- Cousinia iranshahrii Rech.f.
- Cousinia irritans Rech.f.
- Cousinia isfahanica Assadi
- Cousinia × iskanderi Bornm.
- Cousinia jacobsii Rech.f.
- Cousinia jassyensis C.Winkl.
- Cousinia joharchii Assadi & Mehregan
- Cousinia juzepczukii Tscherneva
- Cousinia kadereitii Mehregan & Assadi
- Cousinia kaluensis Rech.f.
- Cousinia × kamarbandensis Rech.f.
- Cousinia karkasensis Mehregan & Djavadi
- Cousinia kasachstanica Sennikov
- Cousinia kataghanica Rech.f.
- Cousinia kazachorum Juz. ex Tscherneva
- Cousinia keredjensis Bornm. & Gauba
- Cousinia kermanensis Mirtadz. & Attar
- Cousinia kermanshahensis Attar, Ghahr. & Assadi
- Cousinia kerstanii Bornm.
- Cousinia khashensis Rech.f.
- Cousinia khorasanica Djavadi & Attar
- Cousinia khorramabadensis Bornm.
- Cousinia kilouyensis Djavadi & Attar
- Cousinia kirrindica Bornm. & Rech.f.
- Cousinia knorringiae Bornm.
- Cousinia koelzii Rech.f.
- Cousinia kokanica Regel & Schmalh.
- Cousinia komaroffii (Kuntze) C.Winkl.
- Cousinia komidjanensis Mehregan
- Cousinia kopi-karadaghensis Rech.f.
- Cousinia kornhuberi Heimerl
- Cousinia korowiakowi C.Winkl.
- Cousinia kotschyi Boiss.
- Cousinia kovalevskiana Tscherneva
- Cousinia krauseana Regel & Schmalh.
- Cousinia kuekenthalii Bornm.
- Cousinia kuramensis
- Cousinia kurdistanica Attar
- Cousinia × kurubasgecidiensis Ilçim & Özçelik
- Cousinia lachnobasis Rech.f. & Köie
- Cousinia lachnopoda Juz.
- Cousinia lachnosphaera Bunge
- Cousinia lactiflora Rech.f.
- Cousinia laetevirens C.Winkl.
- Cousinia lamakini C.Winkl.
- Cousinia lanata C.Winkl.
- Cousinia lancifolia C.Winkl.
- Cousinia laniceps (Bornm.) Juz.
- Cousinia lasiolepis Boiss.
- Cousinia lasiophylla C.Shih
- Cousinia leiocephala (Regel) Juz.
- Cousinia lepida
- Cousinia leptacma Tschern.
- Cousinia leptocampyla Bornm.
- Cousinia leptocephala Fisch. & C.A.Mey.
- Cousinia leptoclada Kult.
- Cousinia leptocladoides Tschern.
- Cousinia leptolepis (Bornm. & Gauba) Rech.f.
- Cousinia leptomera Rech.f.
- Cousinia leucantha Bornm. & Sint.
- Cousinia libanotica DC.
- Cousinia lignosissima Rech.f.
- Cousinia linczewskii Juz.
- Cousinia litwinowiana Bornm.
- Cousinia longibracteata Attar & Mirtadz.
- Cousinia longifolia C.Winkl. & Bornm.
- Cousinia lordeganensis Mehregan
- Cousinia lucida DC.
- Cousinia lurestanica Attar & Djavadi
- Cousinia lurorum Bornm.
- Cousinia lyrata Bunge
- Cousinia maassoumii Assadi
- Cousinia macrocephala C.A.Mey.
- Cousinia macrolepis Boiss. & Hausskn.
- Cousinia macroptera C.A.Mey. ex DC.
- Cousinia magnifica Juz.
- Cousinia malacophylla Rech.f.
- Cousinia malurensis Rech.f.
- Cousinia manucehrii Rech.f. & Esfand.
- Cousinia maracandica Juz.
- Cousinia margaritae Kult.
- Cousinia margiana Juz.
- Cousinia masulehensis Attar & Rastegar
- Cousinia mattfeldii Bornm.
- Cousinia megalomastix Rech.f.
- Cousinia meghrica Takht.
- Cousinia mehreganii Assadi
- Cousinia meshhedensis Bornm. & Rech.f.
- Cousinia × mesomorpha Rech.f.
- Cousinia microcarpa Boiss.
- Cousinia millefontana Rech.f.
- Cousinia mindshelkensis B.Fedtsch.
- Cousinia minkwitziae Bornm.
- Cousinia miserabilis Rech.f.
- Cousinia moabitica Bornm. & Nábelek
- Cousinia mobayenii Ghahr. & Attar
- Cousinia mogensii Rech.f.
- Cousinia mogoltavica Tschern. & Vved.
- Cousinia mollis Schrenk
- Cousinia monocephala Bunge
- Cousinia mozaffarianii Attar, Assadi & Ghahr.
- Cousinia mozdouranensis Djavadi & Attar
- Cousinia mucida Kult. ex Tscherneva
- Cousinia mulgediifolia Bornm.
- Cousinia multiloba DC.
- Cousinia murgabica Tscherneva
- Cousinia mutehensis Rech.f.
- Cousinia myrioglochis Rech.f.
- Cousinia myriolepis Rech.f. & Köie
- Cousinia myriotoma Rech.f. & Köie
- Cousinia nabelekii Bornm.
- Cousinia nana Attar, Ghahr. & Assadi
- Cousinia neglecta Juz.
- Cousinia neubaueri Rech.f.
- Cousinia newesskyana C.Winkl.
- Cousinia ninae Juz.
- Cousinia niveocoronata C.Jeffrey ex Grey-Wilson
- Cousinia noeana Boiss.
- Cousinia novissima Rech.f.
- Cousinia nujianensis Attar, Ghahr., Saber & Zarre
- Cousinia odontolepis DC.
- Cousinia olgae Regel & Schmalh.
- Cousinia oligocephala Boiss.
- Cousinia olivieri DC.
- Cousinia omissa Tscherneva
- Cousinia omphalodes Tscherneva
- Cousinia onopordioides Ledeb.
- Cousinia onopordon Freyn & Sint.
- Cousinia oophora Rech.f.
- Cousinia oopoda Juz.
- Cousinia oreodoxa Bornm. & Sint.
- Cousinia oreoxerophila Kult.
- Cousinia orientalis K.Koch
- Cousinia orthacantha Tscherneva
- Cousinia orthoclada Hausskn. & Bornm.
- Cousinia ortholepis Juz. ex Tscherneva
- Cousinia orthoneura Rech.f.
- Cousinia oshtorankuhensis Attar
- Cousinia ottonis Bornm.
- Cousinia outichaschensis Franch.
- Cousinia ovczinnikovii Tscherneva
- Cousinia oxiana Tscherneva
- Cousinia oxytoma Rech.f.
- Cousinia panjshirensis Rech.f.
- Cousinia pannosa C.Winkl.
- Cousinia pannosiformis Tscherneva
- Cousinia papillosa Djavadi & Attar
- Cousinia parjumanensis Rech.f.
- Cousinia parsana Ghahr., Iranshahr & Attar
- Cousinia parviceps Rech.f. & Köie
- Cousinia parviziana Parsa
- Cousinia pasargardensis Attar
- Cousinia patentispina Tscherneva
- Cousinia pauciramosa Kult.
- Cousinia pectinata Rech.f.
- Cousinia peduncularis Juz. ex Tscherneva
- Cousinia pergamacea Boiss. & Hausskn.
- Cousinia perovskiensis (Bornm.) Juz. ex Tschern.
- Cousinia persarum C.Winkl.
- Cousinia persica Djavadi & Attar
- Cousinia perspolitana Attar & Ghahr.
- Cousinia pestalozzae Boiss.
- Cousinia phyllocephala Bornm. & Gauba
- Cousinia pichleriana Bornm.
- Cousinia pinarocephala Boiss.
- Cousinia pineticola Rech.f. & Gilli
- Cousinia piptocephala Bunge
- Cousinia platyacantha Bunge
- Cousinia platylepis Fisch., C.A.Mey. & Avé-Lall.
- Cousinia platyptera Bornm.
- Cousinia platyraphis Kult.
- Cousinia platystegia Tscherneva
- Cousinia podlechii Rech.f.
- Cousinia podophylla Tschern.
- Cousinia polycephala Rupr.
- Cousinia polyneura Rech.f.
- Cousinia polytimetica Tscherneva
- Cousinia porphyrochrysea Rech.f.
- Cousinia porphyrostephana Rech.f.
- Cousinia postiana C.Winkl.
- Cousinia praestans Tschern. & Vved.
- Cousinia prasina Jaub. & Spach
- Cousinia princeps Franch.
- Cousinia prolifera Jaub. & Spach
- Cousinia proxima Juz.
- Cousinia psammophila Kult.
- Cousinia pseudactinia Rech.f.
- Cousinia pseudaffinis Kult.
- Cousinia pseudobonvalotii Juz.
- Cousinia pseudocandolleana Assadi
- Cousinia pseudocirsium Rech.f.
- Cousinia pseudodshizakensis Tschern. & Vved.
- Cousinia pseudolanata Popov ex Tscherneva
- Cousinia pseudomollis C.Winkl.
- Cousinia pseudostenolepis Rech.f. & Edelb.
- Cousinia pterocarpa Boiss.
- Cousinia pterocaulos (C.A.Mey.) Rech.f.
- Cousinia pugionifera Jaub. & Spach
- Cousinia pulchella Bunge
- Cousinia pulcherantha Attar & Mirtadz.
- Cousinia pulchra C.Winkl.
- Cousinia pulvinaris Rech.f. & Köie
- Cousinia pungens Juz.
- Cousinia purpurea C.A.Mey. ex DC.
- Cousinia pusilla C.Winkl.
- Cousinia pycnocephala Rech.f.
- Cousinia pycnoloba Boiss.
- Cousinia pygmaea C.Winkl.
- Cousinia qaisarensis Rech.f.
- Cousinia qaradaghensis Rech.f.
- Cousinia qarehbilensis Rech.f.
- Cousinia quettensis Rech.f.
- Cousinia racemosa Boiss.
- Cousinia raddeana C.Winkl.
- Cousinia radians Bunge
- Cousinia ramosissima DC.
- Cousinia ramulosa Rech.f.
- Cousinia raphiostegia Rech.f.
- Cousinia rava C.Winkl.
- Cousinia rawanduzensis Mehregan
- Cousinia rechingerae Bornm.
- Cousinia rechingerorum Bornm.
- Cousinia recurvata DC.
- Cousinia regelii C.Winkl.
- Cousinia renominata Rech.f.
- Cousinia resinosa Juz.
- Cousinia rhabdodes Bornm. & Rech.f.
- Cousinia rhaphiocephala Rech.f.
- Cousinia rhodantha Kult.
- Cousinia rhombiformis C.Winkl. & Strauss
- Cousinia rigida Kult.
- Cousinia rigidissima Rech.f.
- Cousinia robusta Rech.f.
- Cousinia rosea Kult.
- Cousinia rotundifolia C.Winkl.
- Cousinia rubiginosa Kult.
- Cousinia rudis Rech.f.
- Cousinia rufidula Bornm.
- Cousinia sabalanica Attar, Ghahr. & Assadi
- Cousinia sabzevarensis Rech.f.
- Cousinia sagittata C.Winkl. & Strauss
- Cousinia sahandica Attar & Djavadi
- Cousinia sakawensis Boiss. & Hausskn.
- Cousinia salangensis Rech.f.
- Cousinia saloukensis Mehregan
- Cousinia sanandajensis Rech.f.
- Cousinia sarawschanica C.Winkl.
- Cousinia sarzehensis Attar, Ghahr. & Assadi
- Cousinia scabrida Juz.
- Cousinia scariosa Regel
- Cousinia scheibeana Bornm.
- Cousinia schepsaica Karmysch.
- Cousinia schindleriana Bornm. & Gauba
- Cousinia schiraziana Attar
- Cousinia schischkinii Juz.
- Cousinia schistoptera Juz.
- Cousinia schistosa Rech.f. & Edelb.
- Cousinia schtschurowskiana Regel & Schmalh.
- Cousinia scleracantha
- Cousinia sclerolepis C.Shih
- Cousinia sclerophylla Juz.
- Cousinia sefidiana (Pau) Rech.f.
- Cousinia seidlitzii Bunge
- Cousinia semilacera Juz.
- Cousinia serratuloides Boiss.
- Cousinia sewerzowii Regel
- Cousinia shahrestanica Rech.f.
- Cousinia shahvarica Rech.f.
- Cousinia sharifii Attar & Amini Rad
- Cousinia shebliensis Ghahr., Iranshahr & Attar
- Cousinia sheidaii Attar, Ghahr. & Mahdigholi
- Cousinia shibarensis Rech.f.
- Cousinia shorlughensis Rech.f.
- Cousinia shugnanica Juz.
- Cousinia shulabadensis Attar & Ghahr.
- Cousinia sicigera C.Winkl. & Bornm.
- Cousinia silvanica Attar
- Cousinia silyboides Jaub. & Spach
- Cousinia simulatrix C.Winkl.
- Cousinia singularis Rech.f.
- Cousinia sintenisii Freyn
- Cousinia sivasica Hub.-Mor.
- Cousinia smirnowii Trautv.
- Cousinia sogdiana Bornm.
- Cousinia sororia Juz.
- Cousinia spathulata Kult.
- Cousinia speciosa C.Winkl.
- Cousinia sphaerocephala Janb. & Spach
- Cousinia spiridonowii Juz.
- Cousinia splendida C.Winkl.
- Cousinia sporadocephala Juz.
- Cousinia spryginii Kult.
- Cousinia stahliana Bornm. & Gauba
- Cousinia stapfiana Freyn & Sint.
- Cousinia stechmanniopsis Rech.f.
- Cousinia stellaris Bornm.
- Cousinia stenocalathia Rech.f.
- Cousinia stenocephala Boiss.
- Cousinia stenophylla Kult.
- Cousinia stephanophora C.Winkl.
- Cousinia stereolepis Rech.f.
- Cousinia stereoneura Rech.f.
- Cousinia stocksii C.Winkl.
- Cousinia stricta Tschern.
- Cousinia strobilocephala Tschern. & Vved.
- Cousinia stroterolepis Rech.f.
- Cousinia subappendiculata Kult.
- Cousinia subcandicans Tschern.
- Cousinia subinflata Bornm.
- Cousinia submutica Franch.
- Cousinia subpectinata Mirtadz., Attar & Assadi
- Cousinia subscaposa Rech.f.
- Cousinia subtilis Juz.
- Cousinia sylvicola Bunge
- Cousinia syrdarjensis Kult.
- Cousinia tabrisiana Bunge
- Cousinia takharensis Rech.f.
- Cousinia talassica (Kult.) Juz. ex Tschern.
- Cousinia tamarae Juz.
- Cousinia tashkurghanica Rech.f.
- Cousinia taybadensis Djavadi & Attar
- Cousinia tedshenica Tscherneva
- Cousinia tenella Fisch. & C.A.Mey.
- Cousinia tenuifolia C.A.Mey. ex DC.
- Cousinia tenuiramula Rech.f.
- Cousinia tenuisecta Juz.
- Cousinia tenuispina Rech.f.
- Cousinia termei Rech.f.
- Cousinia tetanocephala Bornm. & Gauba
- Cousinia thamnodes Boiss. & Hausskn.
- Cousinia thomsonii C.B.Clarke
- Cousinia tianschanica Kult.
- Cousinia tirinensis Rech.f.
- Cousinia trachylepis Bunge
- Cousinia trachyphylla Juz.
- Cousinia trachyphyllaria Bornm. & Rech.f.
- Cousinia tragacanthoides Rech.f. & Gilli
- Cousinia transiliensis Juz.
- Cousinia transoxana Tscherneva
- Cousinia triceps Kult.
- Cousinia trichophora Kult.
- Cousinia tricolor Rech.f.
- Cousinia trollii Bornm.
- Cousinia tscherneviae Berdyev
- Cousinia turcomanica C.Winkl.
- Cousinia turkmenorum Bornm. & Gauba
- Cousinia ulotoma Bornm.
- Cousinia umbilicata Juz.
- Cousinia unaiensis Rech.f.
- Cousinia urumiensis Bornm.
- Cousinia verbascifolia Bunge
- Cousinia verticillaris Bunge
- Cousinia vicaria Kult.
- Cousinia volkii Rech.f.
- Cousinia vvedenskyi Tscherneva
- Cousinia waldheimiana Bornm.
- Cousinia wendelboi Rech.f.
- Cousinia wesheni Post
- Cousinia wilhelminae Rech.f.
- Cousinia winkleriana Aitch. & Hemsl.
- Cousinia woronowii Bornm.
- Cousinia xanthacantha Regel
- Cousinia xanthina Bornm.
- Cousinia xanthiocephala Tscherneva
- Cousinia xanthothyrsa Rech.f. & Gilli
- Cousinia xanthula Rech.f.
- Cousinia xiphiolepis Boiss.
- Cousinia yasujensis Attar
- Cousinia zagrica Attar, Ghahr. & Assadi
