= List of Saxifraga species =

The following species in the flowering plant genus Saxifraga, the saxifrages, are accepted by Plants of the World Online. Natural hybridization is commonplace within the genus, and more 2000 horticultural hybrids have been created, but lasting hybrid speciation events appear to be rare.

== A ==
- Saxifraga acerifolia Wakab. & Satomi
- Saxifraga adscendens L.
- Saxifraga afghanica Aitch. & Hemsl.
- Saxifraga aizoides L.
- Saxifraga × akinfievii Galushko & Kudrjasch.
- Saxifraga alberti Regel & Schmalh.
- Saxifraga × alejandrei P.Vargas
- Saxifraga aleutica Hultén
- Saxifraga × alloysii-villarii T.E.Díaz, Fern.Areces & Pérez Carro
- Saxifraga alpigena Harry Sm.
- Saxifraga anadyrensis Losinsk.
- Saxifraga andersonii Engl.
- Saxifraga androsacea L.
- Saxifraga × angelisii Strobl
- Saxifraga angustata Harry Sm.
- Saxifraga anisophylla Harry Sm.
- Saxifraga aphylla Sternb.
- Saxifraga aquatica Lapeyr.
- Saxifraga arachnoidea Sternb.
- Saxifraga × aragonensis H.J.Coste & Soulié
- Saxifraga aretioides Lapeyr.
- Saxifraga × arguellesii Carlón, J.M.González, M.Laínz, Moreno Mor., Rodr.Berd. & Ó.S
- Saxifraga aristulata Hook.f. & Thomson
- Saxifraga × arizagae Alejandre, Arizal. & Benito
- Saxifraga artvinensis V.A.Matthews
- Saxifraga asarifolia Sternb.
- Saxifraga aspera L.
- Saxifraga assamensis Wadhwa
- Saxifraga atuntsiensis W.W.Sm.
- Saxifraga aurantiaca Franch.
- Saxifraga auriculata Engl. & Irmsch.

== B ==
- Saxifraga babiana T.E.Díaz & Fern.Prieto
- Saxifraga baimashanensis C.Y.Wu
- Saxifraga balfourii Engl. & Irmsch.
- Saxifraga banmaensis J.T.Pan
- Saxifraga × baregensis Rouy & E.G.Camus
- Saxifraga benzilanensis H.Chuang
- Saxifraga bergenioides C.Marquand
- Saxifraga berica (Bég.) D.A.Webb
- Saxifraga × bertolonii Sünd.
- Saxifraga bicuspidata Hook.f.
- Saxifraga biflora All.
- Saxifraga bijiangensis H.Chuang
- Saxifraga biternata Boiss.
- Saxifraga × blatii Mateo, Fabado & C.Torres
- Saxifraga blavii (Engl.) Beck
- Saxifraga × blyttii Engl. & Irmsch.
- Saxifraga × borderi Rouy & E.G.Camus
- Saxifraga boreo-olympica Halda
- Saxifraga bourgaeana Boiss. & Reut.
- Saxifraga boussingaultii Brongn.
- Saxifraga brachyphylla Franch.
- Saxifraga brachypoda D.Don
- Saxifraga brachypodoidea J.T.Pan
- Saxifraga bracteata D.Don
- Saxifraga brevicaulis Harry Sm.
- Saxifraga bronchialis L.
- Saxifraga brunneopunctata Harry Sm.
- Saxifraga brunonis Wall. ex Ser.
- Saxifraga bryoides L.
- Saxifraga bulbifera L.
- Saxifraga bulleyana Engl. & Irmsch.
- Saxifraga burmensis Harry Sm. ex Wadhwa
- Saxifraga burseriana L.

== C ==
- Saxifraga cacuminum Harry Sm.
- Saxifraga × cadevallii Luizet & Soulié
- Saxifraga caesia L.
- Saxifraga callosa Sm.
- Saxifraga calopetala Harry Sm.
- Saxifraga × camboana Font Quer
- Saxifraga camposii Boiss. & Reut.
- Saxifraga canaliculata Boiss. & Reut. ex Engl.
- Saxifraga candelabrum Franch.
- Saxifraga × capitata Lapeyr.
- Saxifraga caprariae Mannocci, Ferretti, Mazzoncini & Viciani
- Saxifraga cardiophylla Franch.
- Saxifraga carinata Oett.
- Saxifraga carnosula Mattf.
- Saxifraga carpatica Sternb.
- Saxifraga carpetana Boiss. & Reut.
- Saxifraga caspica Sliplivinsky
- Saxifraga caucasica Sommier & Levier
- Saxifraga caveana W.W.Sm.
- Saxifraga cebennensis Rouy & E.G.Camus
- Saxifraga × celtiberica Fuente, Sánchez Mata & G.Navarro
- Saxifraga cernua L.
- Saxifraga cespitosa L.
- Saxifraga chadwellii Wadhwa
- Saxifraga champutungensis H.Chuang
- Saxifraga cherlerioides D.Don
- Saxifraga chionophila Franch.
- Saxifraga chrysantha A.Gray
- Saxifraga chrysanthoides Engl. & Irmsch.
- Saxifraga chumbiensis Engl. & Irmsch.
- Saxifraga × churchillii Huter
- Saxifraga ciliatopetala (Engl. & Irmsch.) J.T.Pan
- Saxifraga cinerascens Engl. & Irmsch.
- Saxifraga cinerea Harry Sm.
- Saxifraga cintrana Kuzinsky ex Willk.
- Saxifraga clivorum Harry Sm.
- Saxifraga coarctata W.W.Sm.
- Saxifraga × cochleariifolia Schrad. ex Kunze
- Saxifraga cochlearis Rchb.
- Saxifraga columnaris Schmalh. ex Akinf.
- Saxifraga × columpoda Holubec
- Saxifraga congestiflora Engl. & Irmsch.
- Saxifraga conifera Coss. & Durieu
- Saxifraga × conradiae J.Prudhomme
- Saxifraga consanguinea W.W.Sm.
- Saxifraga contrarea Harry Sm.
- Saxifraga cordigera Hook.f. & Thomson
- Saxifraga corsica (Ser.) Gren. & Godr.
- Saxifraga cortusifolia Siebold & Zucc.
- Saxifraga × costei Luizet & Soulié
- Saxifraga cotyledon L.
- Saxifraga × crawfordii E.S.Marshall
- Saxifraga crustata Vest
- Saxifraga culcitosa Mattf.
- Saxifraga cuneata Willd.
- Saxifraga cuneifolia L.
- Saxifraga cymbalaria L.

== D ==
- Saxifraga dahaiensis H.Chuang
- Saxifraga damingshanensis W.B.Liao, W.Y.Zhao & J.H.Jin
- Saxifraga daochengensis J.T.Pan
- Saxifraga daqiaoensis F.G.Wang & F.W.Xing
- Saxifraga × darrieuxii Luizet & Soulié
- Saxifraga × davidis-webbii P.Vargas
- Saxifraga debilis Engelm. ex A.Gray
- Saxifraga decora Harry Sm.
- Saxifraga decussata J.Anthony
- Saxifraga × degeniana Hand.-Mazz. & J.Wagner
- Saxifraga demnatensis Coss. ex Engl. & Irmscher
- Saxifraga densifoliata Engl. & Irmsch.
- Saxifraga depressa Sternb.
- Saxifraga deqenensis C.Y.Wu
- Saxifraga × desetangsii Luizet & Soulié
- Saxifraga dhwojii (Harry Sm.) S.Akiyama & H.Ohba
- Saxifraga dianxibeiensis J.T.Pan
- Saxifraga diapensia Harry Sm.
- Saxifraga diapensioides Bellardi
- Saxifraga dichotoma Willd.
- Saxifraga dielsiana Engl. & Irmsch.
- Saxifraga diffusicallosa C.Y.Wu
- Saxifraga dingqingensis J.T.Pan
- Saxifraga dinnikii Schmalh. ex Akinf.
- Saxifraga × dinninaris Holubec
- Saxifraga diversifolia Wall. ex Ser.
- Saxifraga dongchuanensis H.Chuang
- Saxifraga dongwanensis H.Chuang
- Saxifraga doyalana Harry Sm.
- Saxifraga drabiformis Franch.
- Saxifraga draboides C.Y.Wu
- Saxifraga dshagalensis Engl.

== E ==
- Saxifraga eglandulosa Engl.
- Saxifraga egregia Engl.
- Saxifraga egregioides J.T.Pan
- Saxifraga elatinoides Hand.-Mazz.
- Saxifraga elliotii Harry Sm.
- Saxifraga elliptica Engl. & Irmsch.
- Saxifraga embergeri Maire
- Saxifraga engleriana Harry Sm.
- Saxifraga epiphylla Gornall & H.Ohba
- Saxifraga erectisepala J.T.Pan
- Saxifraga erinacea Harry Sm.
- Saxifraga erioblasta Boiss. & Reut.
- Saxifraga eschholzii Sternb.
- Saxifraga exarata Vill.
- Saxifraga excellens Harry Sm.

== F ==
- Saxifraga facchinii W.D.J.Koch
- Saxifraga × farreri Druce ex Farrer
- Saxifraga × faucicola T.E.Díaz, Fern.Areces & Pérez Carro
- Saxifraga federici-augusti Biasol.
- Saxifraga felineri P.Vargas
- Saxifraga ferdinandi-coburgi Kellerer & Sünd.
- Saxifraga filicaulis Wall. ex Ser.
- Saxifraga filifolia J.Anthony
- Saxifraga finitima W.W.Sm.
- Saxifraga flaccida J.T.Pan
- Saxifraga flagellaris Willd.
- Saxifraga flavida Harry Sm.
- Saxifraga flexilis W.W.Sm.
- Saxifraga florulenta Moretti
- Saxifraga × fontqueri Pau
- Saxifraga × forojulensis Sünd.
- Saxifraga forrestii Engl. & Irmsch.
- Saxifraga × forsteri Stein
- Saxifraga fortunei Hook.
- Saxifraga fragilis Schrank
- Saxifraga fragosoi Sennen

== G ==
- Saxifraga ganeshii H.Ohba & S.Akiyama
- Saxifraga × gaudinii Brügger
- Saxifraga gedangensis J.T.Pan
- Saxifraga gemmigera Engl. ex Diels
- Saxifraga gemmipara Franch.
- Saxifraga gemmulosa Boiss.
- Saxifraga genesiana P.Vargas
- Saxifraga × gentyana Bouchard
- Saxifraga georgei J.Anthony
- Saxifraga geranioides L.
- Saxifraga × geum L.
- Saxifraga giraldiana Engl.
- Saxifraga glabella Bertol.
- Saxifraga glabricaulis Harry Sm.
- Saxifraga glacialis Harry Sm.
- Saxifraga glaucophylla Franch.
- Saxifraga globulifera Desf.
- Saxifraga gonggashanensis J.T.Pan
- Saxifraga gongshanensis T.C.Ku
- Saxifraga granulata L.
- Saxifraga granulifera Harry Sm.
- Saxifraga × guadarramica Fern.Casas
- Saxifraga gyalana C.Marquand & Airy Shaw

== H ==
- Saxifraga habaensis C.Y.Wu ex H.Chuang
- Saxifraga haenseleri Boiss. & Reut.
- Saxifraga hakkariensis Fırat
- Saxifraga haplophylloides Franch.
- Saxifraga harae H.Ohba & Wakab.
- Saxifraga hariotii Luizet & Soulié
- Saxifraga harry-smithii Wadhwa
- Saxifraga × hausmannii A.Kern.
- Saxifraga × haussknechtii Stein
- Saxifraga hederacea L.
- Saxifraga hederifolia Hochst. ex A.Rich.
- Saxifraga heleonastes Harry Sm.
- Saxifraga hemisphaerica Hook.f. & Thomson
- Saxifraga hengduanensis H.Chuang
- Saxifraga × hetenbeliana Bürgel
- Saxifraga heteroclada Harry Sm.
- Saxifraga heterocladoides J.T.Pan
- Saxifraga heterotricha C.Marquand & Airy Shaw
- Saxifraga hirculoides Decne.
- Saxifraga hirculus L.
- Saxifraga hirsuta L.
- Saxifraga hispidula D.Don
- Saxifraga hohenwartii Vest ex Sternb.
- Saxifraga hookeri Engl. & Irmsch.
- Saxifraga hostii Tausch
- Saxifraga hyperborea R.Br.
- Saxifraga hypericoides Franch.
- Saxifraga hypnoides L.
- Saxifraga hypostoma Harry Sm.

== I ==
- Saxifraga imparilis Balf.f.
- Saxifraga implicans Harry Sm.
- Saxifraga inconspicua W.W.Sm.
- Saxifraga insolens Irmsch.
- Saxifraga intricata Lapeyr.
- Saxifraga iranica Bornm.
- Saxifraga irrigua M.Bieb.
- Saxifraga isophylla Harry Sm.
- Saxifraga italica D.A.Webb

== J ==
- Saxifraga jacquemontiana Decne.
- Saxifraga jainzhuglaensis J.T.Pan
- Saxifraga jaljalensis H.Ohba & S.Akiyama
- Saxifraga jamalensis Zhmylev & Razzh.
- Saxifraga jarmilae Halda
- Saxifraga jingdongensis H.Chuang
- Saxifraga josephi Engl.
- Saxifraga × jouffroyi Rouy
- Saxifraga juniperifolia Adams
- Saxifraga jurtzevii Zhmylev

== K ==
- Saxifraga × karacardica Bürgel
- Saxifraga karadzicensis (Degen & Košanin) Bürgel
- Saxifraga kashmeriana U.Dhar & Kachroo
- Saxifraga kegangii D.G.Zhang, Ying Meng & M.H.Zhang
- Saxifraga khiakhensis Holubec & Křivka
- Saxifraga kinchingingae Engl.
- Saxifraga kingdonii C.Marquand
- Saxifraga kingiana Engl. & Irmsch.
- Saxifraga × kochii Hornung
- Saxifraga koelzii Schönb.-Tem.
- Saxifraga kolenatiana Regel
- Saxifraga kongboensis Harry Sm.
- Saxifraga korshinskyi Kom.
- Saxifraga kotschyi Boiss.
- Saxifraga kumaunensis Engl.
- Saxifraga kwangsiensis Chun & F.C.How ex C.Z.Gao & G.Z.Li

== L ==
- Saxifraga lactea Turcz.
- Saxifraga × lainzii P.Vargas
- Saxifraga lamninamensis H.Ohba
- Saxifraga latepetiolata Willk.
- Saxifraga latiflora Hook.f. & Thomson
- Saxifraga × lecomtei Luizet & Soulié
- Saxifraga lepida Harry Sm.
- Saxifraga × lhommei H.J.Coste & Soulié
- Saxifraga × lhostei Bouchard
- Saxifraga likiangensis Franch.
- Saxifraga lilacina Duthie
- Saxifraga linearifoiia Engl. & Irmsch.
- Saxifraga litangensis Engl.
- Saxifraga lixianensis T.C.Ku
- Saxifraga llonakhensis W.W.Sm.
- Saxifraga longifolia Lapeyr.
- Saxifraga loripes J.Anthony
- Saxifraga losae Sennen
- Saxifraga lowndesii Harry Sm.
- Saxifraga ludingensis J.T.Pan
- Saxifraga ludlowii Harry Sm.
- Saxifraga luizetiana Emb. & Maire
- Saxifraga × luizetii Sennen
- Saxifraga luoxiaoensis W.B.Liao, L.Wang & X.J.Zhang
- Saxifraga lushuiensis H.Chuang
- Saxifraga × luteopurpurea Lapeyr.
- Saxifraga luteoviridis Schott & Kotschy
- Saxifraga lychnitis Hook.f. & Thomson

== M ==
- Saxifraga macrocalyx Tolm.
- Saxifraga macrostigmatoides Engl.
- Saxifraga maderensis D.Don
- Saxifraga magellanica Poir.
- Saxifraga maireana Luizet
- Saxifraga mallae H.Ohba & Wakab.
- Saxifraga marginata Sternb.
- Saxifraga × martyi Luizet & Soulié
- Saxifraga × mattfeldii Engl.
- Saxifraga maweana Baker
- Saxifraga maxionggouensis J.T.Pan
- Saxifraga mazanderanica Rech.f.
- Saxifraga media Gouan
- Saxifraga medogensis J.T.Pan
- Saxifraga meeboldii Engl. & Irmsch.
- Saxifraga megacordia C.Y.Wu ex H.Chuang
- Saxifraga × melzeri Köckinger
- Saxifraga mengtzeana Engl. & Irmsch.
- Saxifraga micans Harry Sm.
- Saxifraga microcephala A.P.Khokhr. & Kuvaev
- Saxifraga microgyna Engl. & Irmsch.
- Saxifraga microphylla Royle ex Hook.f. & Thomson
- Saxifraga minutifoliosa C.Y.Wu ex H.Chuang
- Saxifraga minutissima D.S.Rawat
- Saxifraga mira Harry Sm.
- Saxifraga miralana Harry Sm.
- Saxifraga × miscellanea Luizet & Soulié
- Saxifraga monantha Harry Sm.
- Saxifraga moncayensis D.A.Webb
- Saxifraga montanella Harry Sm.
- Saxifraga montis-christi Mannocci, Ferretti, Mazzoncini & Viciani
- Saxifraga × montserratii T.E.Díaz, Fern.Areces & Pérez Carro
- Saxifraga moorcroftiana (Ser.) Wall. ex Sternb.
- Saxifraga moschata Wulfen
- Saxifraga mucronulata Royle
- Saxifraga mucronulatoides J.T.Pan
- Saxifraga × muretii Rambert
- Saxifraga muscoides All.
- Saxifraga mutata L.

== N ==
- Saxifraga nakaoi Kitam.
- Saxifraga nakaoides J.T.Pan
- Saxifraga nambulana Harry Sm.
- Saxifraga namdoensis Harry Sm.
- Saxifraga nana Engl.
- Saxifraga nanella Engl. & Irmsch.
- Saxifraga nanelloides C.Y.Wu
- Saxifraga nangqenica J.T.Pan
- Saxifraga nangxianensis J.T.Pan
- Saxifraga nathorstii (Dusén) Hayek
- Saxifraga neopropagulifera H.Hara
- Saxifraga nevadensis Boiss.
- Saxifraga nigroglandulifera N.P.Balakr.
- Saxifraga nigroglandulosa Engl. & Irmsch.
- Saxifraga nipponica Makino
- Saxifraga nishidae Miyabe & Kudô
- Saxifraga numidica Maire

== O ==
- Saxifraga × obscura Gren. & Godr.
- Saxifraga omolojensis A.P.Khokhr.
- Saxifraga omphalodifolia Hand.-Mazz.
- Saxifraga × opdalensis Blytt
- Saxifraga oppositifolia L.
- Saxifraga oreophila Franch.
- Saxifraga osloensis Knaben
- Saxifraga ovczinnikovii Kamelin

== P ==
- Saxifraga × padellae Brügger
- Saxifraga paiquensis J.T.Pan
- Saxifraga palpebrata Hook.f. & Thomson
- Saxifraga paniculata Mill.
- Saxifraga paradoxa Sternb.
- Saxifraga pardanthina Hand.-Mazz.
- Saxifraga parkaensis J.T.Pan
- Saxifraga parnassifolia D.Don
- Saxifraga parnassiodes Regel & Schmalh.
- Saxifraga parva Hemsl.
- Saxifraga × patens Gaudin
- Saxifraga × paxii Engl. & Irmsch.
- Saxifraga pedemontana All.
- Saxifraga pellucida C.Y.Wu
- Saxifraga pentadactylis Lapeyr.
- Saxifraga peplidifolia Franch.
- Saxifraga peraristulata Mattf.
- Saxifraga perpusilla Hook.f. & Thomson
- Saxifraga petraea L.
- Saxifraga pilifera Hook.f. & Thomson
- Saxifraga × polita (Haw.) Link
- Saxifraga poluniniana Harry Sm.
- Saxifraga porophylla Bertol.
- Saxifraga × portae Stein
- Saxifraga portosanctana Boiss.
- Saxifraga praetermissa D.A.Webb
- Saxifraga pratensis Engl. & Irmsch.
- Saxifraga prattii Engl. & Irmsch.
- Saxifraga prenja Beck
- Saxifraga presolanensis Engl.
- Saxifraga × prietoi T.E.Díaz, Fern.Areces & Pérez Carro
- Saxifraga × prudhommei Aubin
- Saxifraga przewalskii Engl.
- Saxifraga × pseudocontinentalis T.E.Díaz, Fern.Areces & Pérez Carro
- Saxifraga pseudohirculus Engl.
- Saxifraga pseudolaevis Oett.
- Saxifraga pseudoparvula H.Chuang
- Saxifraga pubescens Pourr.
- Saxifraga pulchra Engl. & Irmsch.
- Saxifraga pulvinaria Harry Sm.
- Saxifraga punctulata Engl.
- Saxifraga punctulatoides J.T.Pan

== Q ==
- Saxifraga quadrifaria Engl. & Irmsch.

== R ==
- Saxifraga × ramondii Luizet & Neyraut
- Saxifraga ramsarica Jamzad
- Saxifraga ramulosa Wall. ex Ser.
- Saxifraga × recoderi Fern.Areces, L.Villar & T.E.Díaz
- Saxifraga retusa Gouan
- Saxifraga reuteriana Boiss.
- Saxifraga × reyeri Huter
- Saxifraga rhodopetala Harry Sm.
- Saxifraga × richteri Luizet & Soulié
- Saxifraga rigoi Freyn ex Porta
- Saxifraga × rivas-martinezii T.E.Díaz, Fern.Areces & Pérez Carro
- Saxifraga rivularis L.
- Saxifraga rizhaoshanensis J.T.Pan
- Saxifraga rosacea Moench
- Saxifraga rotundifolia L.
- Saxifraga rotundipetala J.T.Pan
- Saxifraga roylei Harry Sm.
- Saxifraga rufescens Balf.f.
- Saxifraga rupicola Franch.

== S ==
- Saxifraga saginoides Hook.f. & Thomson
- Saxifraga × saleixiana Gaussen & Lebrun
- Saxifraga sancta Griseb.
- Saxifraga sanguinea Franch.
- Saxifraga saxatilis Harry Sm.
- Saxifraga saxicola Harry Sm.
- Saxifraga saxorum Harry Sm.
- Saxifraga scardica Griseb.
- Saxifraga × schachtii Kummert
- Saxifraga scleropoda Sommier & Levier
- Saxifraga sediformis Engl. & Irmsch.
- Saxifraga sedoides L.
- Saxifraga seguieri Biehler
- Saxifraga selemdzhensis Gorovoj & Vorosch.
- Saxifraga sempervivum K.Koch
- Saxifraga sendaica Maxim.
- Saxifraga serotina Sipliv.
- Saxifraga serpyllifolia Pursh
- Saxifraga serrula Harry Sm.
- Saxifraga sessiliflora Harry Sm.
- Saxifraga shennongii Lei Wang, W.B.Liao & Ji J.Zhang
- Saxifraga sheqilaensis J.T.Pan
- Saxifraga sherriffii Harry Sm.
- Saxifraga sibirica L.
- Saxifraga sibthorpii Boiss.
- Saxifraga sieversiana Sternb.
- Saxifraga signata Engl. & Irmsch.
- Saxifraga signatella C.Marquand
- Saxifraga sikkimensis Engl.
- Saxifraga sinomontana J.T.Pan & Gornall
- Saxifraga smithiana Irmsch.
- Saxifraga × somedana Fern.Prieto & T.E.Díaz
- Saxifraga × sorianoi García Maroto & Gómez-Merc.
- Saxifraga × souliei H.J.Coste
- Saxifraga spathularis Brot.
- Saxifraga sphaeradena Harry Sm.
- Saxifraga spruneri Boiss.
- Saxifraga squarrosa Sieber
- Saxifraga staintonii Harry Sm.
- Saxifraga stella-aurea Hook.f. & Thomson
- Saxifraga stellariifolia Franch.
- Saxifraga stelleriana Merklein ex Ser.
- Saxifraga stenophylla Royle
- Saxifraga stolitzkae Duthie ex Engl. & Irmsch.
- Saxifraga stolonifera Curtis
- Saxifraga stribrnyi (Velen.) Podp.
- Saxifraga strigosa Wall. ex Ser.
- Saxifraga styriaca Köckinger
- Saxifraga subaequifoliata Irmsch.
- Saxifraga subamplexicaulis Engl. & Irmsch.
- Saxifraga sublinearifolia J.T.Pan
- Saxifraga submonantha A.P.Khokhr. & Kuvaev
- Saxifraga subomphalodifolia J.T.Pan
- Saxifraga subsessiliflora Engl. & Irmsch.
- Saxifraga subspathulata Engl. & Irmsch.
- Saxifraga substrigosa J.T.Pan
- Saxifraga subternata Harry Sm.
- Saxifraga subtsangchanensis J.T.Pan
- Saxifraga subverticillata Boiss.
- Saxifraga × superba Rouy & E.G.Camus
- Saxifraga svalbardensis Øvstedal

== T ==
- Saxifraga tangutica Engl.
- Saxifraga taraktophylla C.Marquand & Airy Shaw
- Saxifraga tatsienluensis Engl.
- Saxifraga taygetea Boiss. & Heldr.
- Saxifraga taylorii Calder & Savile
- Saxifraga tenella Wulfen
- Saxifraga tentaculata C.E.C.Fisch.
- Saxifraga terektensis Bunge
- Saxifraga thiantha Harry Sm.
- Saxifraga × thrinax Rech.
- Saxifraga tibetica Losinsk.
- Saxifraga tigrina Harry Sm.
- Saxifraga × tiroliensis A.Kern.
- Saxifraga tombeanensis Boiss. ex Engl.
- Saxifraga trabutiana Engl. & Irmsch.
- Saxifraga trautvetteri Manden.
- Saxifraga triaristulata Hand.-Mazz.
- Saxifraga tricrenata Pau & Font Quer
- Saxifraga tricuspidata Rottb.
- Saxifraga tridactylites L.
- Saxifraga trifurcata Schrad.
- Saxifraga tsangchanensis Franch.
- Saxifraga × tukuchensis Bürgel

== U ==
- Saxifraga umbellulata Hook.f. & Thomson
- Saxifraga umbrosa L.
- Saxifraga unguiculata Engl.
- Saxifraga unguipetala Engl. & Irmsch.
- Saxifraga uninervia J.Anthony
- Saxifraga × urbionica Losa

== V ==
- Saxifraga vacillans Harry Sm.
- Saxifraga valdensis DC.
- Saxifraga valleculosa H.Chuang
- Saxifraga vandellii Sternb.
- Saxifraga vayredana Luizet
- Saxifraga × verguinii Luizet & Soulié
- Saxifraga versicallosa C.Y.Wu ex H.Chuang
- Saxifraga vespertina (Small) Fedde
- Saxifraga × vetteri Burnat
- Saxifraga × vierhapperi Hand.-Mazz.
- Saxifraga virgularis Harry Sm.
- Saxifraga viridipetala Z.X.Zhang & Gornall
- Saxifraga viscidula Hook.f. & Thomson
- Saxifraga voroschilovii Sipliv.
- Saxifraga vulcanica Sipliv.
- Saxifraga vvedenskyi Abdull.

== W ==
- Saxifraga wahlenbergii Ball
- Saxifraga wallichiana Sternb.
- Saxifraga wardii W.W.Sm.
- Saxifraga wenchuanensis T.C.Ku
- Saxifraga wendelboi Schönb.-Tem.
- Saxifraga werneri Font Quer & Pau
- Saxifraga × wettsteinii Brügger
- Saxifraga × wilczekii Verg. & Neyraut ex Luizet
- Saxifraga williamsii Harry Sm.

== X ==
- Saxifraga xiaozhongdianensis J.T.Pan

== Y ==
- Saxifraga yarlungzangboensis J.T.Pan
- Saxifraga yezhiensis C.Y.Wu
- Saxifraga yoshimurae Miyabe & Tatew.
- Saxifraga yushuensis J.T.Pan
- Saxifraga × yvesii Neyraut & Verg. ex Luizet

== Z ==
- Saxifraga zayuensis T.C.Ku
- Saxifraga zhidoensis J.T.Pan
- Saxifraga zimmermannii Baehni
- Saxifraga × zimmeteri A.Kern.
