= List of Ocotea species =

The following species in the flowering plant genus Ocotea are currently accepted by Plants of the World Online. The genus is probably paraphyletic.

- Ocotea abbreviata Schwacke & Mez
- Ocotea acarina C.K.Allen
- Ocotea aciphylla (Nees & Mart.) Mez
- Ocotea acuminatissima (Lundell) Rohwer
- Ocotea acunana Bisse
- Ocotea acutangula (Miq.) Mez
- Ocotea acutifolia (Nees) Mez
- Ocotea adamantina P.L.R.Moraes & van der Werff
- Ocotea adela van der Werff
- Ocotea adenotrachelium (Nees) Mez
- Ocotea adusta van der Werff
- Ocotea alaris Doweld
- Ocotea albescens Vattimo-Gil
- Ocotea albida Mez & Rusby
- Ocotea albigemma C.K.Allen
- Ocotea albopunctulata Mez
- Ocotea aligra van der Werff
- Ocotea alnifolia (Meisn.) Mez
- Ocotea alpina R.A.Howard
- Ocotea alveata van der Werff
- Ocotea amazonica (Meisn.) Mez
- Ocotea ambrensis van der Werff
- Ocotea amplifolia (Mez & Donn.Sm.) van der Werff
- Ocotea amplissima Mez
- Ocotea andina van der Werff
- Ocotea aniboides Mez
- Ocotea antioquiensis van der Werff
- Ocotea aquila van der Werff
- Ocotea arcuata Rohwer
- Ocotea arenaria van der Werff
- Ocotea arenicola L.C.S.Assis & Mello-Silva
- Ocotea argentea Mez
- Ocotea argyrea van der Werff
- Ocotea argyrophylla Ducke
- Ocotea arnottiana (Nees) van der Werff
- Ocotea atacta Lorea-Hern.
- Ocotea athroanthes C.K.Allen
- Ocotea atirrensis Mez & Donn.Sm.
- Ocotea atlantica van der Werff
- Ocotea atrata C.K.Allen
- Ocotea aurantiodora (Ruiz & Pav.) Mez
- Ocotea aureotomentosa L.C.S.Assis
- Ocotea auriculata Lasser
- Ocotea auriculiformis Kosterm.
- Ocotea austinii C.K.Allen
- Ocotea badia van der Werff
- Ocotea bajapazensis Lundell
- Ocotea balanocarpa (Ruiz & Pav.) Mez
- Ocotea bangii Mez & Rusby
- Ocotea baracoensis Borhidi & Imkhan.
- Ocotea barbatula Lundell
- Ocotea barbellata Vattimo-Gil
- Ocotea basicordatifolia Vattimo-Gil
- Ocotea basirecurva C.K.Allen
- Ocotea batata P.L.R.Moraes & M.C.Vergne
- Ocotea beekmanii van der Werff
- Ocotea benthamiana Mez
- Ocotea bernoulliana Mez
- Ocotea betazensis (Mez) van der Werff
- Ocotea beulahiae Baitello
- Ocotea beyrichii (Nees) Mez
- Ocotea bicolor Vattimo-Gil
- Ocotea bijuga (Rottb.) Bernardi
- Ocotea bilocellata Baitello, D.B.O.S.Cardoso & P.L.R.Moraes
- Ocotea bissei Imkhan.
- Ocotea bofo Kunth
- Ocotea boissieriana (Meisn.) Mez
- Ocotea botrantha Rohwer
- Ocotea bourgeauviana (Mez) van der Werff
- Ocotea brachybotrya (Meisn.) Mez
- Ocotea bracteosa (Meisn.) Mez
- Ocotea bragae Coe-Teix.
- Ocotea brenesii Standl.
- Ocotea brevipes Kosterm.
- Ocotea brevipetiolata van der Werff
- Ocotea bucheri Roíg & Acuña
- Ocotea bullata (Burch.) Baill.
- Ocotea caesariata van der Werff
- Ocotea caesia Mez
- Ocotea caesifolia van der Werff
- Ocotea calliscypha L.C.S.Assis & Mello-Silva
- Ocotea camphoromoea Rohwer
- Ocotea canaliculata (Rich.) Mez
- Ocotea candidovillosa Lorea-Hern.
- Ocotea cantareirae Vattimo-Gil
- Ocotea carabobensis Lasser
- Ocotea caracasana (Nees) Mez
- Ocotea carchiensis van der Werff
- Ocotea cardinalis Mez
- Ocotea catharinensis Mez
- Ocotea caudatifolia Kosterm.
- Ocotea ceanothifolia (Nees) Mez
- Ocotea celastroides (Meisn.) Mez
- Ocotea chiapensis (Lundell) Standl. & Steyerm.
- Ocotea choquetangensis van der Werff
- Ocotea chrysobalanoides (Lundell) Lundell
- Ocotea cicatricosa C.K.Allen
- Ocotea ciliata L.C.S.Assis & Mello-Silva
- Ocotea cinerea van der Werff
- Ocotea cissiflora Mez
- Ocotea citrosmoides (Nees) Mez
- Ocotea clavigera Mez
- Ocotea colophanthera L.C.S.Assis & Mello-Silva
- Ocotea comata van der Werff
- Ocotea commutata (Nees) Mez
- Ocotea comoriensis Kosterm.
- Ocotea complicata (Meisn.) Mez
- Ocotea condorensis van der Werff
- Ocotea confertiflora (Meisn.) Mez
- Ocotea congestifolia Lasser
- Ocotea congregata van der Werff
- Ocotea contrerasii Lundell
- Ocotea corethroides Kosterm.
- Ocotea corrugata van der Werff
- Ocotea corymbosa (Meisn.) Mez
- Ocotea cowaniana C.K.Allen
- Ocotea crassifolia (Nees) Mez
- Ocotea crassipedalis van der Werff
- Ocotea crassiramula C.K.Allen
- Ocotea crinita van der Werff
- Ocotea cristalensis Bisse
- Ocotea cryptocarpa Baitello
- Ocotea cryptocaryoides Kosterm.
- Ocotea cuatrecasasii van der Werff
- Ocotea cujumary Mart.
- Ocotea cuneata (Griseb.) M.Gómez
- Ocotea cuneifolia (Ruiz & Pav.) Mez
- Ocotea curucutuensis Baitello
- Ocotea cuscoensis van der Werff
- Ocotea cuspidata van der Werff
- Ocotea cymosa (Nees) Palacký
- Ocotea daphnifolia (Meisn.) Mez
- Ocotea darcyi van der Werff
- Ocotea debilis Mez
- Ocotea deflexa Rohwer
- Ocotea delicata Vicent.
- Ocotea densiflora (Meisn.) Mez
- Ocotea dentata van der Werff
- Ocotea depauperata C.K.Allen
- Ocotea dielsiana O.C.Schmidt
- Ocotea diffusa van der Werff
- Ocotea diospyrifolia (Meisn.) Mez
- Ocotea discrepens C.K.Allen
- Ocotea disjuncta Lorea-Hern.
- Ocotea dispersa (Nees & Mart.) Mez
- Ocotea divaricata (Nees) Mez
- Ocotea domatiata Mez ex Taub.
- Ocotea dominicana (Meisn.) R.A.Howard
- Ocotea douradensis Vattimo-Gil
- Ocotea duidensis Moldenke
- Ocotea duplocolorata Vattimo-Gil
- Ocotea dussii Mez
- Ocotea effusa (Meisn.) Hemsl.
- Ocotea eggersiana Mez
- Ocotea ekmanii O.C.Schmidt
- Ocotea elegans Mez
- Ocotea elliptica Kosterm.
- Ocotea endresiana Mez
- Ocotea erectifolia (C.K.Allen) van der Werff
- Ocotea eriothyrsa Kosterm.
- Ocotea esmeraldana Moldenke
- Ocotea estrellensis (Meisn.) P.L.R.Moraes
- Ocotea eucuneata Lundell
- Ocotea euryphylla van der Werff
- Ocotea euvenosa Lundell
- Ocotea falcata Mez
- Ocotea fasciculata (Nees) Mez
- Ocotea faucherei (Danguy) Danguy
- Ocotea felix Coe-Teix.
- Ocotea fendleri (Meisn.) Rohwer
- Ocotea fistulosa van der Werff
- Ocotea flavantha van der Werff
- Ocotea floribunda (Sw.) Mez
- Ocotea foeniculacea Mez
- Ocotea foetens (Aiton) Baill.
- Ocotea foveolata Kosterm.
- Ocotea froesii A.C.Sm.
- Ocotea frondosa (Meisn.) Mez
- Ocotea fulvescens Standl. & L.O.Williams
- Ocotea fusagasugensis van der Werff
- Ocotea gabonensis Fouilloy
- Ocotea gardneri (Meisn.) Mez
- Ocotea gentryi van der Werff
- Ocotea glaberrima van der Werff
- Ocotea glabra van der Werff
- Ocotea glabriflora van der Werff
- Ocotea glauca (Nees & Mart.) Mez
- Ocotea glaucophylla Moldenke
- Ocotea glaucosericea Rohwer
- Ocotea glaziovii Mez
- Ocotea glomerata (Nees) Mez
- Ocotea gomezii W.C.Burger
- Ocotea gordonii van der Werff
- Ocotea gracilipes Mez
- Ocotea gracilis (Meisn.) Mez
- Ocotea grandifructa L.C.S.Assis & M.F.Santos
- Ocotea granulosa W.Palacios
- Ocotea grayi van der Werff
- Ocotea guaramacalensis van der Werff
- Ocotea guatemalensis Lundell
- Ocotea guianensis Aubl.
- Ocotea gymnoblasta van der Werff
- Ocotea haberi van der Werff
- Ocotea hammeliana van der Werff
- Ocotea harrisii Proctor
- Ocotea hartshorniana Hammel
- Ocotea hemsleyana Mez
- Ocotea heribertoi T.Wendt
- Ocotea heterochroma Mez & Sodiro
- Ocotea heydeana (Mez & Donn.Sm.) Bernardi
- Ocotea hilariana Mez
- Ocotea hirtandra van der Werff
- Ocotea hirtistyla van der Werff
- Ocotea hoehnei Vattimo-Gil
- Ocotea holdridgeana W.C.Burger
- Ocotea huberi van der Werff
- Ocotea hueckii Bernardi
- Ocotea humbertii Kosterm.
- Ocotea humblotii Baill.
- Ocotea hypoglauca (Nees & Mart.) Mez
- Ocotea illustris Rusby
- Ocotea imazensis van der Werff
- Ocotea immersa van der Werff
- Ocotea imrayana Mez
- Ocotea indecora (Schott) Mez
- Ocotea indirectinervia C.K.Allen
- Ocotea infrafoveolata van der Werff
- Ocotea inhauba Coe-Teix.
- Ocotea insignis Mez
- Ocotea insularis (Meisn.) Mez
- Ocotea involuta Kosterm.
- Ocotea iridescens Lorea-Hern. & van der Werff
- Ocotea itatiaiae Vattimo-Gil
- Ocotea ivohibensis van der Werff
- Ocotea jacquinii (Meisn.) Mez
- Ocotea jefensis van der Werff
- Ocotea jelskii Mez
- Ocotea jorge-escobarii C.Nelson
- Ocotea julianii van der Werff
- Ocotea karsteniana Mez
- Ocotea kenyensis (Chiov.) Robyns & R.Wilczek
- Ocotea keriana A.C.Sm.
- Ocotea killipii A.C.Sm.
- Ocotea klotzschiana (Nees) Hemsl.
- Ocotea kolera van der Werff
- Ocotea kostermansiana Vattimo-Gil
- Ocotea laetevirens Standl. & Steyerm.
- Ocotea laevifolia van der Werff
- Ocotea laevigata (Meisn.) Marais
- Ocotea lanata (Nees & Mart.) Mez
- Ocotea lancifolia (Schott) Mez
- Ocotea lancilimba Kosterm.
- Ocotea langsdorffii (Meisn.) Mez
- Ocotea laticostata C.K.Allen
- Ocotea latipetiolata van der Werff
- Ocotea laxa (Nees) Mez
- Ocotea lenitae van der Werff
- Ocotea lentii W.C.Burger
- Ocotea leptobotra (Ruiz & Pav.) Mez
- Ocotea leptophylla van der Werff
- Ocotea leucophloea (Nees & Mart.) L.C.S.Assis & Mello-Silva
- Ocotea leucoxylon (Sw.) Laness.
- Ocotea lherminieri Mez
- Ocotea libanensis Bisse
- Ocotea liesneri van der Werff
- Ocotea ligulata van der Werff
- Ocotea limae Vattimo-Gil
- Ocotea limiticola van der Werff
- Ocotea lindbergii Mez
- Ocotea lobbii (Meisn.) Rohwer
- Ocotea loefgrenii Vattimo-Gil
- Ocotea longipedicellata van der Werff
- Ocotea longipes Kosterm.
- Ocotea longipetiolata van der Werff
- Ocotea loxensis van der Werff
- Ocotea macrantha van der Werff
- Ocotea macrocarpa Kosterm.
- Ocotea macrophylla Kunth
- Ocotea macropoda (Kunth) Mez
- Ocotea madagascariensis (Meisn.) Palacký
- Ocotea magnifolia (Lundell) Lundell
- Ocotea magnifrons van der Werff
- Ocotea magnilimba Kosterm.
- Ocotea malcomberi van der Werff
- Ocotea mandonii Mez
- Ocotea mantiqueirae Baitello, Arzolla & F.E.Vilela
- Ocotea maranguapensis Vattimo-Gil
- Ocotea marcescens L.C.S.Assis & Mello-Silva
- Ocotea marmellensis Mez
- Ocotea martinicensis Mez
- Ocotea marumbiensis Brotto & Baitello
- Ocotea mascarena (Buc'hoz) Kosterm.
- Ocotea matogrossensis Vattimo-Gil
- Ocotea matudae Lundell
- Ocotea maximilianea (Nees & Mart.) P.L.R.Moraes
- Ocotea megacarpa van der Werff
- Ocotea megaphylla (Meisn.) Mez
- Ocotea megistophylla van der Werff
- Ocotea meyendorffiana (Meisn.) Mez
- Ocotea meziana C.K.Allen
- Ocotea micans Mez
- Ocotea micrantha van der Werff
- Ocotea microbotrys (Meisn.) Mez
- Ocotea microneura (Meisn.) Rohwer
- Ocotea minarum (Nees & Mart.) Mez
- Ocotea minor Vicent.
- Ocotea minutiflora O.C.Schmidt
- Ocotea moaensis Bisse
- Ocotea mollicella (S.F.Blake) van der Werff
- Ocotea mollifolia Mez & Pittier
- Ocotea mollivillosa van der Werff
- Ocotea montana Mez
- Ocotea monteverdensis W.C.Burger
- Ocotea montis-insulae van der Werff
- Ocotea monzonensis Mez
- Ocotea moschata (Meisn.) Mez
- Ocotea mosenii Mez
- Ocotea mucronata (Poir.) Kosterm.
- Ocotea multiflora van der Werff
- Ocotea multinervis van der Werff
- Ocotea munacensis O.C.Schmidt
- Ocotea myriantha (Meisn.) Mez
- Ocotea neblinae C.K.Allen
- Ocotea nectandrifolia Mez
- Ocotea neesiana (Miq.) Kosterm.
- Ocotea nervosa Kosterm.
- Ocotea nigra Benoist
- Ocotea nigrescens Vicent.
- Ocotea nigrita (Lundell) Lundell
- Ocotea nilssonii C.K.Allen
- Ocotea nitida (Meisn.) Rohwer
- Ocotea nobilis (A.C.Sm.) Kosterm.
- Ocotea notata (Nees & Mart.) Mez
- Ocotea nunesiana (Vattimo-Gil) Baitello
- Ocotea nutans (Nees) Mez
- Ocotea obliqua Vicent.
- Ocotea oblonga (Meisn.) Mez
- Ocotea oblongifolia van der Werff
- Ocotea obovata (Ruiz & Pav.) Mez
- Ocotea obovatifolia van der Werff
- Ocotea obtusata (Nees) Kosterm.
- Ocotea obtusifolia Kunth
- Ocotea odorata (Meisn.) Mez
- Ocotea odorifera (Vell.) Rohwer
- Ocotea olivacea A.C.Sm.
- Ocotea oppositifolia S.Yasuda
- Ocotea oreophila van der Werff
- Ocotea orientalis van der Werff
- Ocotea otara van der Werff
- Ocotea ottoschmidtii J.F.Macbr.
- Ocotea ovalifolia Mez
- Ocotea pachypoda Mez & Sodiro
- Ocotea pacifica van der Werff
- Ocotea pajonalis van der Werff
- Ocotea palaciosii van der Werff
- Ocotea palcazuensis van der Werff
- Ocotea papyracea van der Werff
- Ocotea paranaensis Brotto, Baitello, Cervi & E.P.Santos
- Ocotea parvula (Lundell) van der Werff
- Ocotea pastazensis van der Werff
- Ocotea patula van der Werff
- Ocotea pauciflora (Nees) Mez
- Ocotea pausiaca Rohwer
- Ocotea pautensis van der Werff
- Ocotea pedanomischa van der Werff
- Ocotea pedicellata van der Werff
- Ocotea pentagona Mez
- Ocotea percoriacea Kosterm.
- Ocotea percurrens Vicent.
- Ocotea perforata Kosterm.
- Ocotea perrobusta (C.K.Allen) Rohwer
- Ocotea persicifolia Mez & Donn.Sm.
- Ocotea petalanthera (Meisn.) Mez
- Ocotea pharomachrosorum Gómez-Laur.
- Ocotea pichinchensis van der Werff
- Ocotea pittieri (Mez) van der Werff
- Ocotea piurensis Mez
- Ocotea platyphylla (Lundell) Rohwer
- Ocotea pluridomatiata A.Quinet
- Ocotea polyantha (Nees & Mart.) Mez
- Ocotea pomaderrioides (Meisn.) Mez
- Ocotea porosa (Nees & Mart.) Barroso
- Ocotea porphyria (Griseb.) van der Werff
- Ocotea portoricensis Mez
- Ocotea praetermissa van der Werff
- Ocotea producta (C.K.Allen) Rohwer
- Ocotea prolifera (Nees & Mart.) Mez
- Ocotea prunifolia Rusby
- Ocotea pseudopalmana W.C.Burger
- Ocotea psychotrioides Kunth
- Ocotea puberula (Rich.) Nees
- Ocotea pulchella (Nees & Mart.) Mez
- Ocotea pullifolia van der Werff
- Ocotea pumila L.C.S.Assis & Mello-Silva
- Ocotea purpurea (Mez) van der Werff
- Ocotea quadriporata (W.C.Burger) Kosterm.
- Ocotea racemiflora Lundell
- Ocotea racemosa (Danguy) Kosterm.
- Ocotea ramosissima L.C.S.Assis & Mello-Silva
- Ocotea raymondiana van der Werff
- Ocotea recurvata van der Werff
- Ocotea reticularis (Britton & P.Wilson) Alain
- Ocotea revoluta Moldenke
- Ocotea revolutifolia A.Quinet
- Ocotea rhodophylla Vicent.
- Ocotea rhytidotricha Rohwer
- Ocotea rigens (Nees & Mart.) Rohwer
- Ocotea rigidifolia Kosterm.
- Ocotea rivularis Standl. & L.O.Williams
- Ocotea robertsoniae Proctor
- Ocotea rohweri P.L.R.Moraes & van der Werff
- Ocotea roseopedunculata van der Werff
- Ocotea rotundata van der Werff
- Ocotea rovirosae Lorea-Hern. & van der Werff
- Ocotea rubrinervis Mez
- Ocotea rufa Mez
- Ocotea rufescens van der Werff
- Ocotea rufotomentella van der Werff
- Ocotea rufovestita Ducke
- Ocotea rugosa van der Werff
- Ocotea rupestris L.C.S.Assis & Mello-Silva
- Ocotea salvadorensis (Lundell) van der Werff
- Ocotea salvinii Mez
- Ocotea sambiranensis van der Werff
- Ocotea sanariapensis Lasser
- Ocotea sandwithii Kosterm.
- Ocotea santamartae van der Werff
- Ocotea sarcodes Lorea-Hern.
- Ocotea sassafras (Meisn.) Mez
- Ocotea satipensis van der Werff
- Ocotea sauroderma Lorea-Hern.
- Ocotea scabrella van der Werff
- Ocotea scalariformis van der Werff
- Ocotea scandens Kosterm.
- Ocotea schomburgkiana (Nees) Mez
- Ocotea schwackeana Mez
- Ocotea semicompleta (Nees & Mart.) Mez
- Ocotea sericea Kunth
- Ocotea serrana Coe-Teix.
- Ocotea sessiliflora Kosterm.
- Ocotea silvae Vattimo-Gil
- Ocotea silvestris Vattimo-Gil
- Ocotea sinaiana Vattimo-Gil
- Ocotea sinuata (Mez) Rohwer
- Ocotea smithiana O.C.Schmidt
- Ocotea smithii van der Werff
- Ocotea sodiroana Mez
- Ocotea solomonii van der Werff
- Ocotea spanantha van der Werff
- Ocotea spathulata Mez
- Ocotea spectabilis (Meisn.) Mez
- Ocotea sperata P.L.R.Moraes & van der Werff
- Ocotea spixiana (Nees) Mez
- Ocotea splendens (Meisn.) Baill.
- Ocotea sprucei (Meisn.) Mez
- Ocotea squarrosa (Nees) Mez
- Ocotea staminoides Proctor
- Ocotea standleyi C.K.Allen
- Ocotea stenoneura Mez & Pittier
- Ocotea stenophylla van der Werff
- Ocotea strigosa van der Werff
- Ocotea stuebelii Mez
- Ocotea suaveolens (Meisn.) Benth. & Hook.f. ex Hieron.
- Ocotea subalata Lundell
- Ocotea subparamicola van der Werff
- Ocotea subrutilans Mez
- Ocotea subterminalis van der Werff
- Ocotea subtriplinervia (Meisn.) Hemsl.
- Ocotea sulcata Vattimo-Gil
- Ocotea tabacifolia (Meisn.) Rohwer
- Ocotea tampicensis (Meisn.) Hemsl.
- Ocotea tarapotana (Meisn.) Mez
- Ocotea tarmensis van der Werff
- Ocotea teleiandra (Meisn.) Mez
- Ocotea tenella A.C.Sm.
- Ocotea tenera Mez & Donn.Sm.
- Ocotea tenuiflora (Nees) Mez
- Ocotea terciopelo C.K.Allen
- Ocotea teresae P.L.R.Moraes & T.D.M.Barbosa
- Ocotea tessmannii O.C.Schmidt
- Ocotea thinicola van der Werff & P.L.R.Moraes
- Ocotea thouvenotii (Danguy) Kosterm.
- Ocotea tillettsiana C.K.Allen
- Ocotea tomentella Sandwith
- Ocotea tomentosa van der Werff
- Ocotea tonduzii Standl.
- Ocotea tonii (Lundell) van der Werff
- Ocotea tovarensis (Klotzsch & H.Karst. ex Nees) Mez
- Ocotea trematifera van der Werff
- Ocotea trichantha Baker
- Ocotea trichophlebia Baker
- Ocotea trinidadensis Kosterm.
- Ocotea tristis (Nees & Mart.) Mez
- Ocotea truncata Lundell
- Ocotea tsaratananensis van der Werff
- Ocotea tubulosa Lasser
- Ocotea ucayalensis O.C.Schmidt
- Ocotea umbrina van der Werff
- Ocotea urbaniana Mez
- Ocotea uxpanapana T.Wendt & van der Werff
- Ocotea vaccinioides (Meisn.) Mez
- Ocotea vaginans (Meisn.) Mez
- Ocotea valerioana (Standl.) W.C.Burger
- Ocotea valerioides W.C.Burger
- Ocotea vanderwerffii (Kosterm.) van der Werff
- Ocotea varabilis
- Ocotea vasquezii van der Werff
- Ocotea vegrandis P.L.R.Moraes & van der Werff
- Ocotea velloziana (Meisn.) Mez
- Ocotea velutina (Nees) Mart. ex B.D.Jacks.
- Ocotea venosa Gleason
- Ocotea venulosa (Nees) Baitello
- Ocotea verapazensis Standl. & Steyerm.
- Ocotea vergelensis van der Werff
- Ocotea verticillata Rohwer
- Ocotea viburnoides (Meisn.) Mez
- Ocotea villosa Kosterm.
- Ocotea virgultosa Mart. ex Mez
- Ocotea viridiflora Lundell
- Ocotea weberbaueri Mez
- Ocotea whitei Woodson
- Ocotea wilhelminae Vattimo-Gil
- Ocotea wrightii (Meisn.) Mez
- Ocotea wurdackiana C.K.Allen
- Ocotea xanthocalyx (Nees) Mez
- Ocotea yutajensis C.K.Allen
- Ocotea zahamenensis van der Werff
- Ocotea zoque Lorea-Hern.
