= Cousinia annua =

Scientific classification
- Kingdom: Plantae
- Clade: Tracheophytes
- Clade: Angiosperms
- Clade: Eudicots
- Clade: Asterids
- Order: Asterales
- Family: Asteraceae
- Genus: Cousinia
- Species: C. annua

Binomial name
- Cousinia annua C.Winkl.

Synonyms
- Cousinia dichacantha Lipsky; Lipskyella annua (C.Winkl.) Juz.

Genus of flowering plants

Cousinia annua is a species of flowering plant in the family Asteraceae. It is native to Central Asia; Kazakhstan, Turkmenistan, and Uzbekistan.
