= Cousinia multiloba =

Scientific classification
- Kingdom: Plantae
- Clade: Tracheophytes
- Clade: Angiosperms
- Clade: Eudicots
- Clade: Asterids
- Order: Asterales
- Family: Asteraceae
- Genus: Cousinia
- Species: C. multiloba

Binomial name
- Cousinia multiloba DC.

Synonyms
- Arctium multilobum Kuntze; Cousinia palmatiloba Jaub. & Spach; Cousinia gnaphalodes Bornm.; Cousinia elegans Aitch. & Hemsl.

Species of flowering plant

Cousinia multiloba is a species of flowering plants in the tribe Cardueae. It is found in Iran and Afghanistan.
