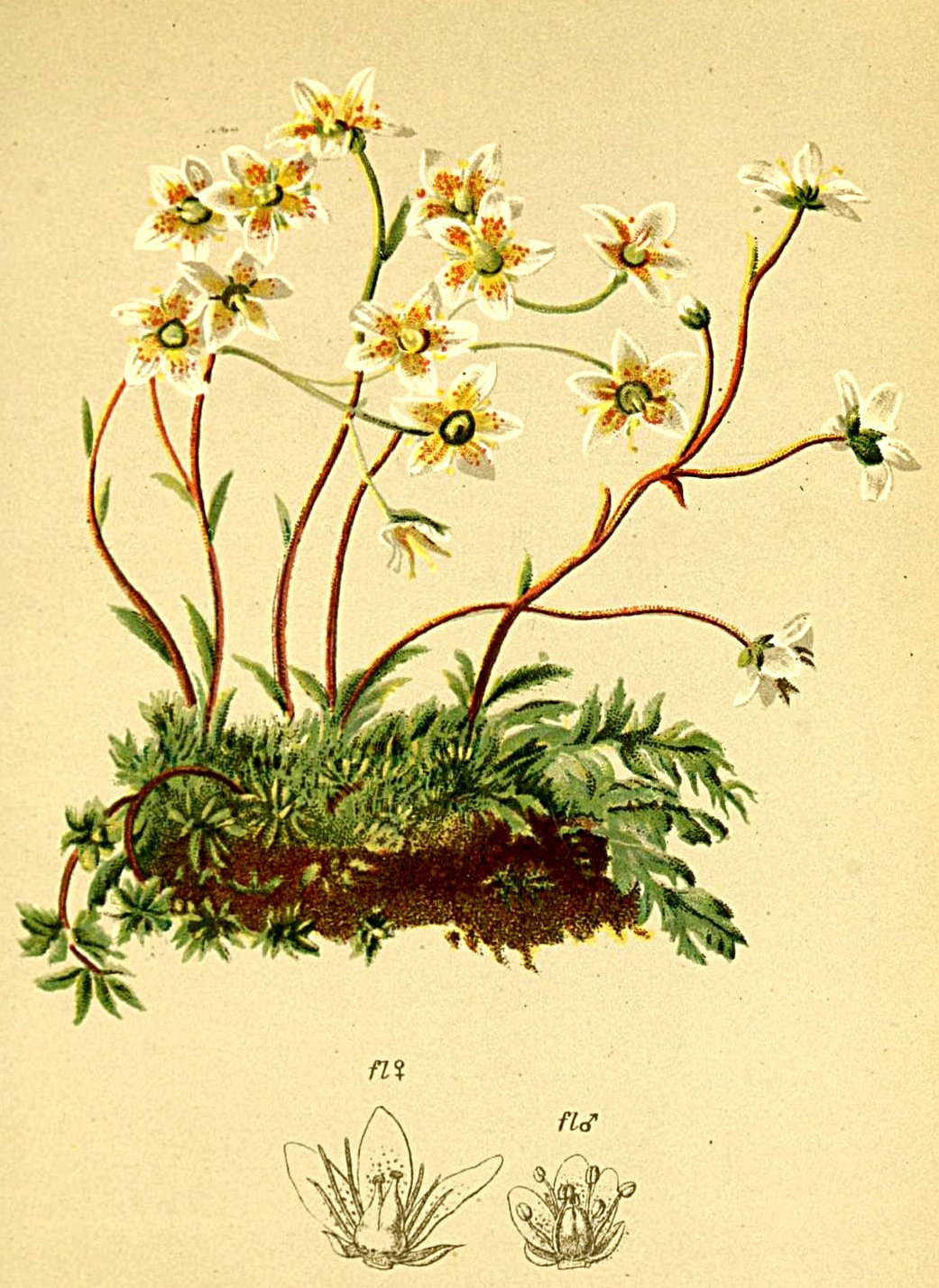
- Saxifraga aspera from the Atlas der Alpenflora

Scientific classification
- Kingdom: Plantae
- Clade: Tracheophytes
- Clade: Angiosperms
- Clade: Eudicots
- Order: Saxifragales
- Family: Saxifragaceae
- Genus: Saxifraga
- Species: S. aspera

Binomial name
- Saxifraga aspera L.

= Saxifraga aspera =

Species of flowering plant

Saxifraga aspera is a species of saxifrage known by the common name of rough saxifrage. In German it is known as Rauhhaariger Steinbrech. It is placed in section Trachyphyllum of the genus Saxifraga. There are two subspecies, Saxifraga aspera subsp. aspera and Saxifraga aspera subsp. micrantha. It is a plant of the pan-Arctic tundra and is also found in Europe at moderately high altitudes in the Alps, Pyrenees and northern Apennines.

== Description ==
Rough saxifrage is a perennial herb with short, tufted, basal rosettes growing in small, loose clumps to a height of about 5 centimetres (2.0 in). The margins of the linear lanceolate leaves are fringed with short bristly hairs giving the plant a rough appearance. The foliaceous buds in the axils of the leaves are only half as long as their protecting leaves, a fact that distinguishes this species from the rather similar mossy saxifrage, Saxifraga bryoides. The flowers are up to 2 cm (0.8 in) in diameter and are borne singly or in few-flowered spikes on long, erect stems clad with a few small leaves. Each flower has five calyx lobes and five, slightly overlapping, broad white or cream coloured petals with a yellow blotch near the base and sometimes a number of yellow spots. The ten stamens are in two whorls, one slightly longer than the other. The ovary is superior and the fruit is a two-celled capsule. Rough saxifrage flowers in June and July.

== Distribution and habitat ==
Rough saxifrage is predominantly a plant of the Arctic tundra. It is one of only two species in the Saxifraga section Trachyphyllum (the other being Saxifraga bryoides) to extend is range into Western Europe where it is found at altitudes of between 1,400 and 3,000 metres (4,600 and 9,800 ft) in the Alps, Pyrenees and northern Apennines. The plant typically grows on damp rocks and gravel on the banks of streams but it is sometimes found growing in turf. It prefers acid conditions and avoids calcareous soils.
