= Ocotea cuneata =

Conservation status
- Least Concern (IUCN 3.1)

Scientific classification
- Kingdom: Plantae
- Clade: Tracheophytes
- Clade: Angiosperms
- Clade: Magnoliids
- Order: Laurales
- Family: Lauraceae
- Genus: Ocotea
- Species: O. cuneata

Binomial name
- Ocotea cuneata (Griseb.) M.Gómez

Synonyms
- Laurus cuneata Dombey ex Nees; Nectandra cuneata Griseb.; Nemodaphne cuneata (Griseb.) Meisn.; Ocotea nemodaphne Mez, nom. illeg. superfl.; Ocotea victorinii Roíg & Acuña; Oreodaphne obovata A.Rich.

Species of flowering plant

Ocotea cuneata is a species of flowering plant in the family Lauraceae. It is a tree native to the islands of Cuba, Hispaniola (Haiti and the Dominican Republic), and Puerto Rico in the Caribbean. It grows up to 15 metres tall in moist lowland forests on limestone.
