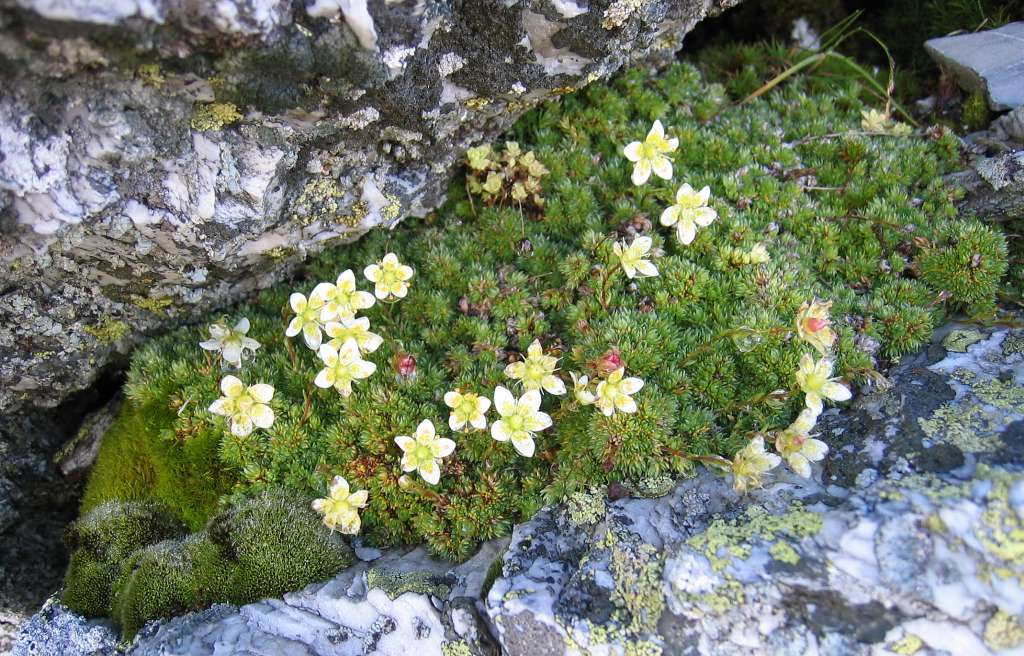
- Saxifraga bryoides in its natural habitat in the mountains above Zermatt

Scientific classification
- Kingdom: Plantae
- Clade: Tracheophytes
- Clade: Angiosperms
- Clade: Eudicots
- Order: Saxifragales
- Family: Saxifragaceae
- Genus: Saxifraga
- Species: S. bryoides

Binomial name
- Saxifraga bryoides L.

= Saxifraga bryoides =

Species of flowering plant

Saxifraga bryoides is a species of saxifrage known by the common name of mossy saxifrage. In German it is known as Moosartiger Steinbrech. It is an inhabitant of the Alps and other mountain ranges at high altitudes in continental Europe.

== Description ==
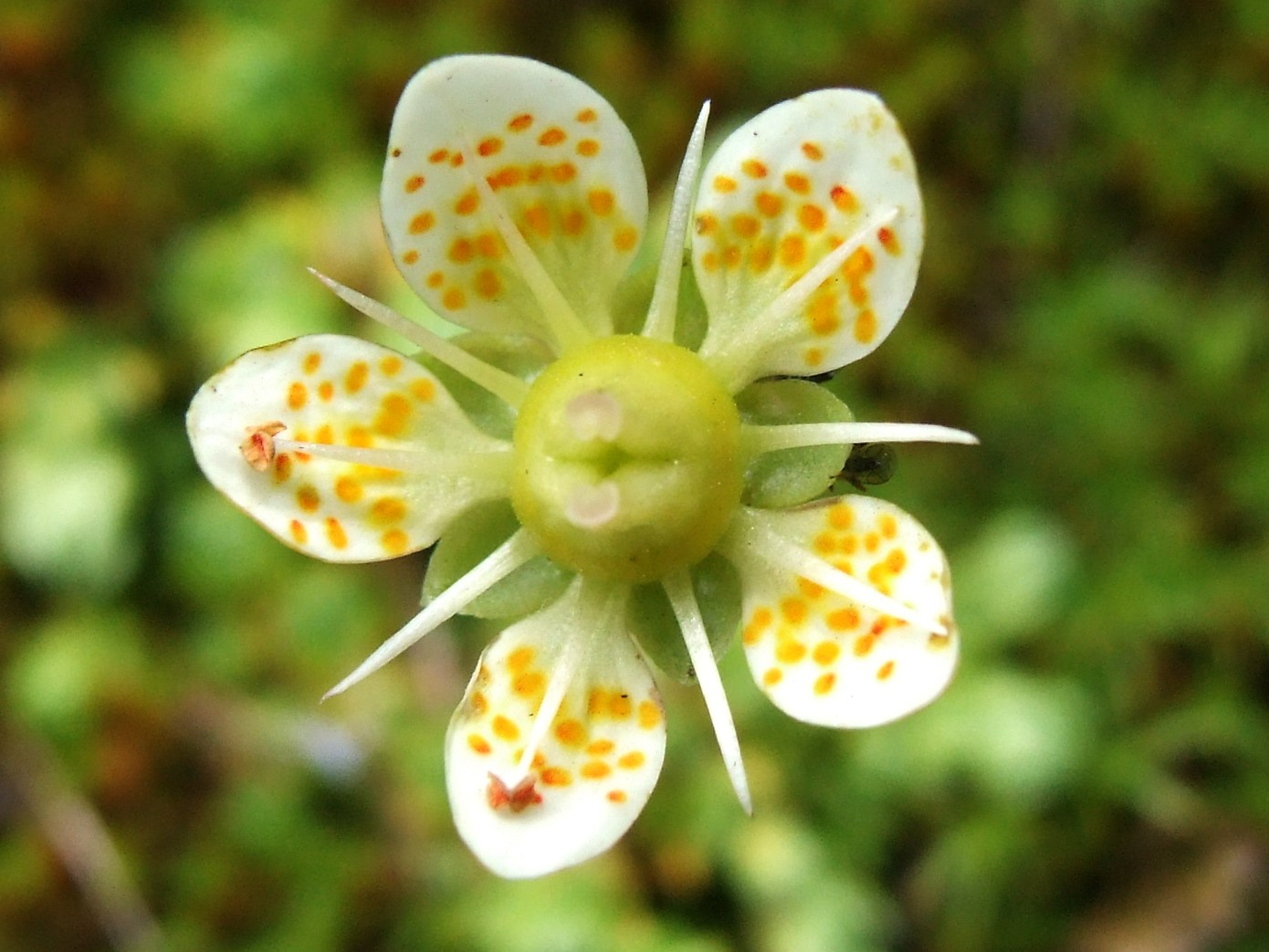
Flower of Saxifraga bryoides

Mossy saxifrage is a low growing, evergreen perennial plant forming dense mats of foliage which seldom exceed 2.5 cm (1.0 in) in height. The leaves are linear lanceolate fringed with bristly hairs. The leaves curl together in winter and this form of growth is typical of plants growing at high altitudes and under cold conditions because it conserves energy. The leaves in the mat are about 5 mm (0.2 in) long while those that are found on the flowering stem are 8 mm (0.3 in) long. The leaf buds in the axils of the leaves are at least as long as the protecting leaves, a fact that distinguishes this species from the rather similar rough saxifrage, Saxifraga aspera. The two species also occupy rather different habitats with the mossy saxifrage being found at higher altitudes, favouring rocky, exposed positions, while the rough saxifrage is often found on damp rocks by streams. The flowers are borne singly on erect stems and are relatively large. The stems are slightly hairy and are often tinged red, as are the five calyx lobes. There are usually five (occasionally six) petals which are oval and do not overlap each other. They are white with the lower half copiously dotted with yellow spots. The ten stamens with orange anthers are in two whorls, with the longer stamens occupying the gaps between the petals. The ovary is superior, the style has two stigmas and the fruit is a two celled capsule. The flowers can be seen in July and August.

== Distribution and habitat ==
Saxifraga bryoides is one of only two species in the section Trachyphyllum that occurs at high altitudes in continental Europe, the other being Saxifraga aspera. It occurs in the Alps, the Pyrenees, the Carpathians and the Balkan Mountains at altitudes between 1,900 and 3,000 metres (6,200 and 9,800 ft) It occurs among silicaceous rocks and occupies ledges and fissures in the rock on cliffs, ridges and summits.

== Use in cultivation ==
Mossy saxifrage can be grown in a rockery in temperate climates and can be propagated from seed or by cuttings. It likes gritty, well drained soil. Apparently healthy, established plants sometimes detach themselves from their roots. This tendency is likely to be caused by excessively damp conditions.
