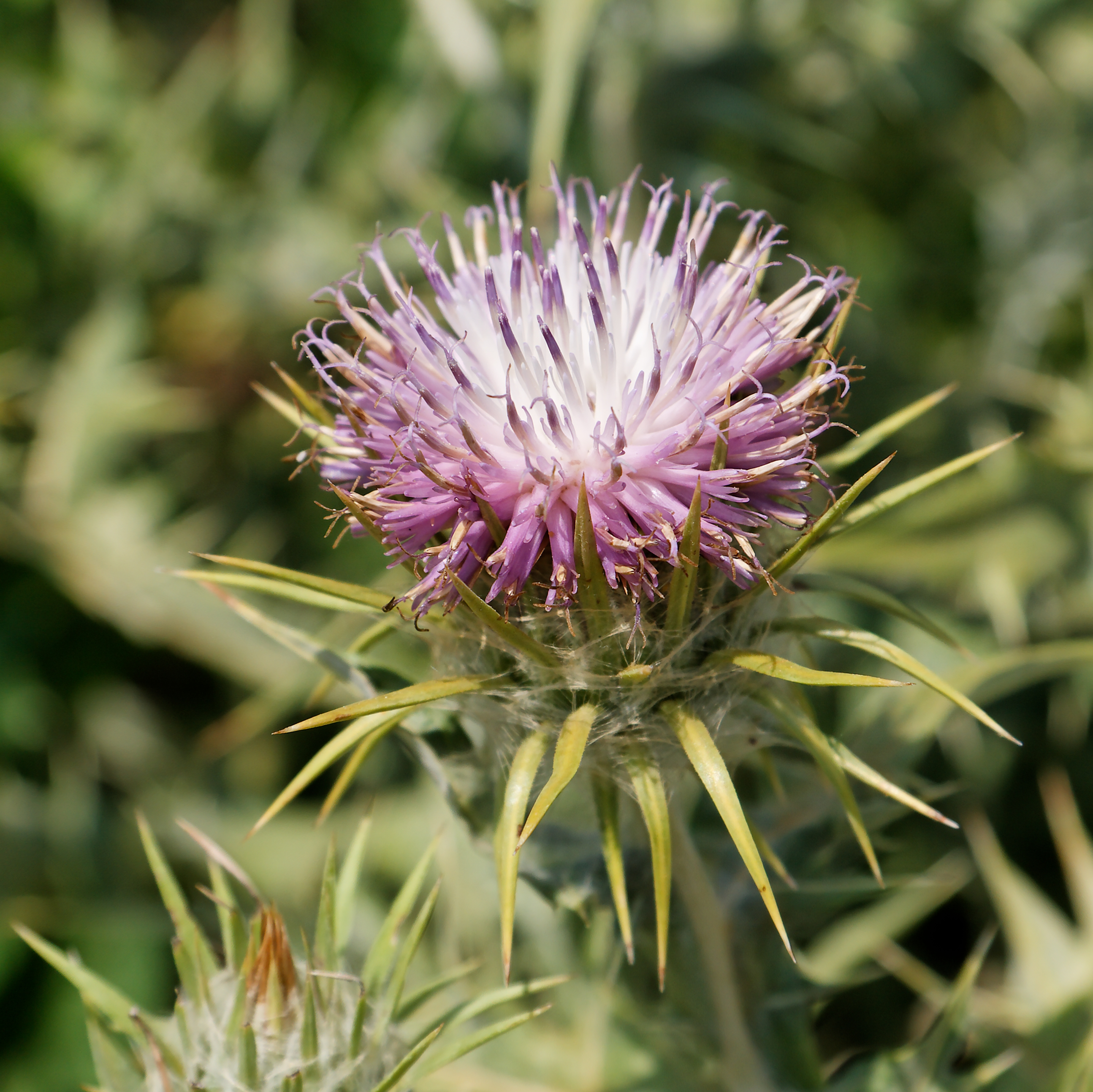
- Cousinia pterocaulos

Scientific classification
- Kingdom: Plantae
- Clade: Tracheophytes
- Clade: Angiosperms
- Clade: Eudicots
- Clade: Asterids
- Order: Asterales
- Family: Asteraceae
- Subfamily: Carduoideae
- Tribe: Cardueae
- Subtribe: Arctiinae
- Genus: Cousinia; Cass.

Synonyms
- Auchera DC.; Lipskyella Juz.; Tiarocarpus Rech.f.

= Cousinia =

Genus of flowering plants

The genus Cousinia of the tribe Cardueae is in its current circumscription one of the larger genera in the Asteraceae, with approximately 650-700 described species distributed in central and western Asia.

Many of the species in this genus were once classified in genus Arctium (the burdocks).
