= Bearpaw =

Bearpaw or Bear Paw may refer to:

- Bearpaw (brand), a brand of footwear, including sheepskin boots, slippers and casual shoes
- Bear-paw poppies, the genus of the poppy family Papaveraceae
- Mikołaj "Bearpaw" Potocki (1595–1651), Polish nobleman
- Bearpaw Mountain, a summit in Washington state
- Bear Paw Mountains, mountain range in the U.S. state of Montana
- Bearpaw Formation, a rock formation in the U.S. state of Montana, as well as the Canadian provinces of Alberta and Saskatchewan, named for the Bear Paw Mountains in Montana
- Bear's Paw, a mountain in the U.S. state of North Carolina
- a type of snowshoe
- Bear Paws, a family of cookies manufactured by Dare Foods, a Canada-based food manufacturing company
- Cotyledon tomentosa, a species of flowering plant in the family Crassulaceae, native to South Africa, a subspecies of which is known as bear's paw

== See also ==
- Battle of Bear Paw
