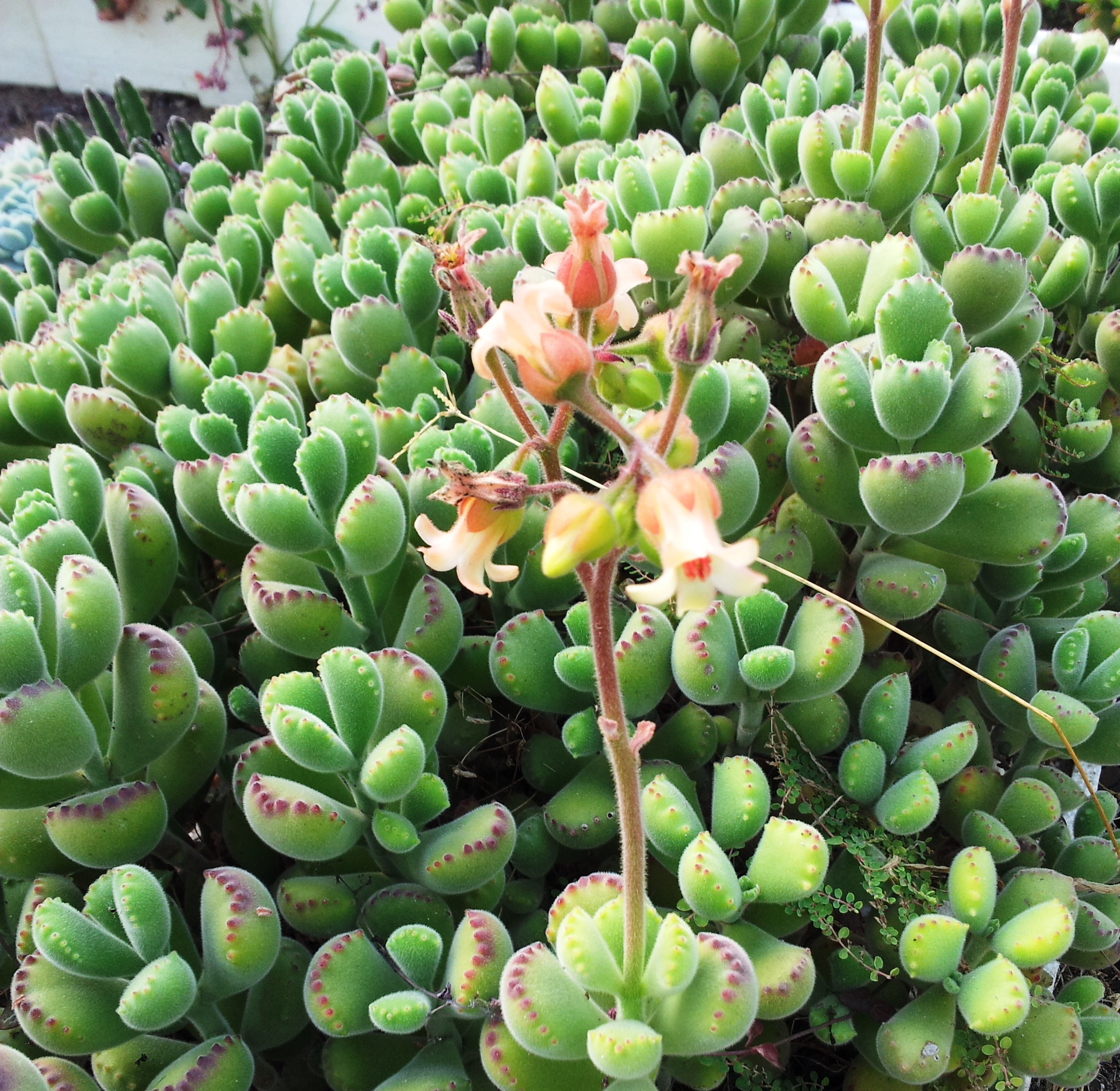
- Cotyledon tomentosa in bloom

Conservation status
- Vulnerable (SANBI Red List)

Scientific classification
- Kingdom: Plantae
- Clade: Tracheophytes
- Clade: Angiosperms
- Clade: Eudicots
- Order: Saxifragales
- Family: Crassulaceae
- Genus: Cotyledon
- Species: C. tomentosa

Binomial name
- Cotyledon tomentosa Harv., 1862
- Distribution of Cotyledon tomentosa in South Africa subsp. tomentosa subsp. ladismithiensis

Synonyms
- for subsp. tomentosa: Cotyledon tomentosa Harv., 1862; Cotyledon ladysmithiensis Poelln., misapplied by Boom, 1958; for subsp. ladismithiensis: Cotyledon heterophylla Schonland, 1907 (nom. illeg.); Cotyledon ladysmithiensis Poelln., 1936; Cotyledon tomentosa subsp. ladismithiensis (Poelln.) Toelken, 1977 (possible nom. illeg., see § Taxonomy)

= Cotyledon tomentosa =

Species of succulent

Cotyledon tomentosa is a species of flowering plant in the family Crassulaceae, native to South Africa. It is a succulent evergreen shrub with large chunky ovate fuzzy green leaves. Its autonymous subspecies is known as the bear's paw because of the prominent "teeth" at the tips of its leaves. It forms large orange bell-shaped flowers in spring.

In its native habitat, the Little Karoo region of South Africa, Cotyledons usually grow in rocky quartz fields where they have excellent drainage provided by very porous soil.

== Description ==
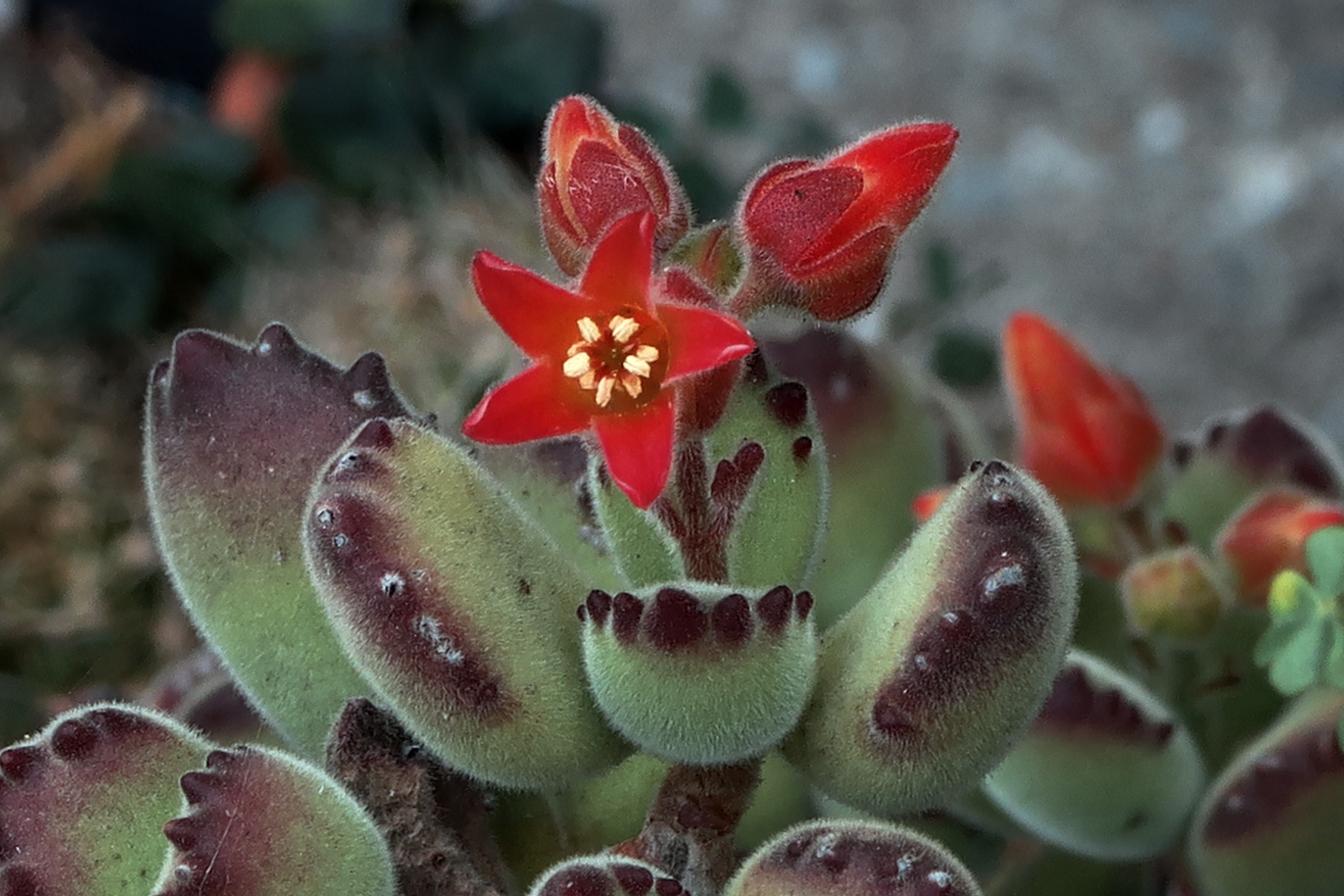
Tomentose leaves and flowers

Cotyledon tomentosa is a perennial evergreen shrub, which is a member of the Crassulaceae family of succulent flowering plants. C. tomentosa has red, orange, or yellow bell-shaped flowers between July and September, and there are two recognized subspecies, subsp. tomentosa and subsp. ladismithiensis.

C. tomentosa subsp. tomentosa, the autonymous subspecies, is a small, freely branched shrublet that grows to 70 cm tall. It has chunky green tomentose leaves that are oblanceolate to oblong, with 3-8 reddish teeth at the end. The other subspecies, subsp. ladismithiensis, features long cylindrical leaves that generally do not have teeth. Subsp. ladismithiensis also tends to be smaller and less branched than subsp. tomentosa. Finally, subsp. ladismithiensis has brown peeling bark, compared to the green hairy branches of subsp. tomentosa.

Leaf shape comparison

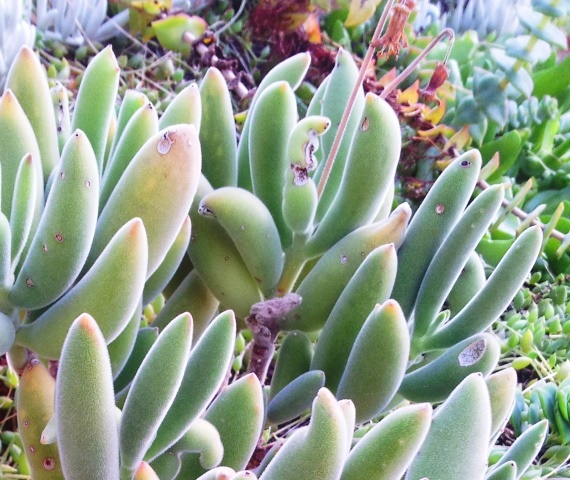
subsp. ladismithiensis

== Taxonomy ==
Cotyledon tomentosa was described in 1862 by William Henry Harvey, and has no synonyms.

Cotyledon tomentosa subsp. ladismithiensis was first described in 1907 by botanist Selmar Schonland, who named it Cotyledon heterophylla. Schonland noted that C. heterophylla seemed "more robust than C. tomentosa, Harv. to which it is probably nearly allied." Schonland also cautioned that the differences he noted between C. heterophylla and C. tomentosa "to be used with great caution" as "relative characters [in the genus Cotyledon] are frequently inconstant." However, the name C. heterophylla was a nomen illegitimum, because it had already been applied in 1824 by William Roxburgh to what is now called Kalanchoe lanceolata.

In 1936, Karl von Poellnitz noted the conflict and gave the taxon a new name, Cotyledon ladysmithiensis, for its native range near the town of Ladismith, South Africa. Hellmut R. Toelken reclassified the taxon in 1977 as a subspecies, Cotyledon tomentosa subsp. ladismithiensis, retaining a different spelling of von Poellnitz's name. This is the current accepted name of the subspecies, as listed on Plants of the World Online. According to Magrit Bischofberger, von Poellnitz's original spelling should be used according to Article 60.1 of the International Code of Nomenclature, which states a name should not be changed even if it contains a spelling discrepancy (i.e. Ladismith vs. ladysmithiensis). Another spelling variation used by the Illustrated Handbook of Succulent Plants is "ladismithensis."

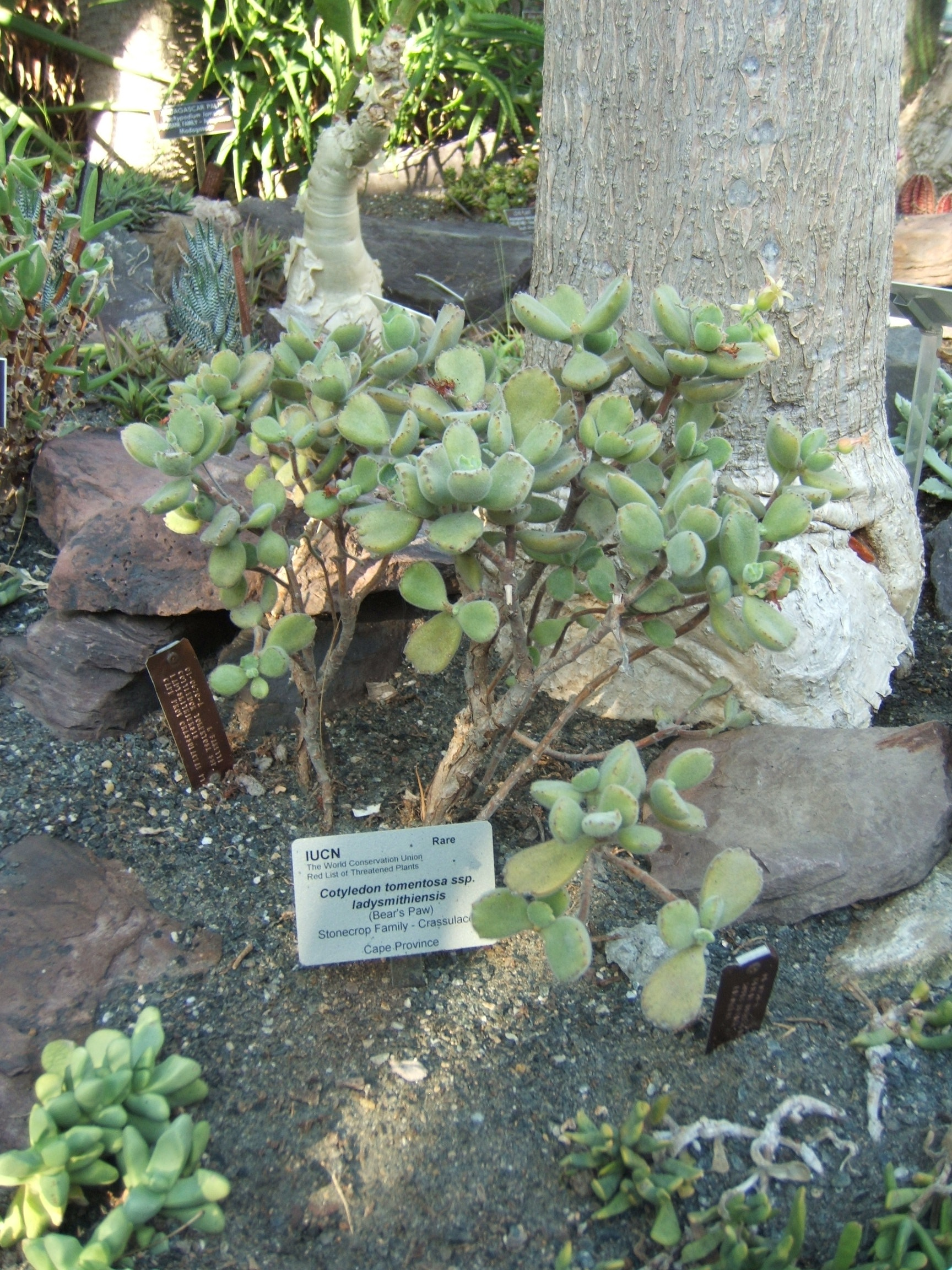
"ladysmithiensis" spelling used at the US Botanic Garden

== Ecology ==
=== Habitat and conservation ===
Cotyledon tomentosa is native to the semidesert Little Karoo region located in the southern parts of South Africa, from Ladismith to Steytlerville. C. tomentosa subsp. tomentosa is found near Calitzdorp, Willowmore, and Steytlerville, in the gravely soil of arid thicket, in slopes of sheltered ravines. In contrast, subsp. ladismithiensis is found in rocky outcrops in the southern Western Cape, between Laingsburg, Ladismith, and Muiskraal.

As of 2006, both subspecies are listed as vulnerable on the SANBI Red List of South African Plants, because they have only been found in small subpopulations and are threatened by habitat degradation and illegal gathering for the succulent trade. C. tomentosa subsp. tomentosa has only been found in five subpopulations, while subsp. ladismithiensis has only been found in seven subpopulations and has experienced a 10% decline in population over the past 90 years.

=== Toxicity ===
While C. tomentosa may be vulnerable to trampling by livestock, it is also known to be poisonous to livestock, dogs, and humans. Cotyledon species are known to contain cardiac glycosides, including bufadienolides, which are highly toxic to cattle, sheep, goats, and other livestock. The bufadienolides found in Cotyledon cause both acute and chronic poisoning. On the World Health Organization toxicity scale, cardiac glycosides are considered Class Ia, "extremely hazardous," and a dose of only 1.0 g/kg body weight of a related species, Cotyledon orbiculata, was lethal when fed to sheep.

Bufadienolides are classified as neurotoxins because they are strong inhibitors of sodium potassium pumps which are central to the function of animal nervous systems. Acute poisoning causes cardiac irregularity and heart failure. Other acute symptoms include apathy, hypersalivation, and tremors. Chronic poisoning in sheep and goats causes a paraplegic disease known as krimpsiekte ("shrink disease" in Afrikaans), so named because poisoned individuals may arch their backs and bend their necks to one side. Krimpsiekte may have a mortality rate as high as 90%. These toxins persist in the flesh of livestock afflicted with krimpsiekte, even after cooking, and dogs who consume this meat can exhibit similar neuromuscular symptoms. This secondary poisoning may also affect humans, but has not been thoroughly investigated.

== Cultivation ==
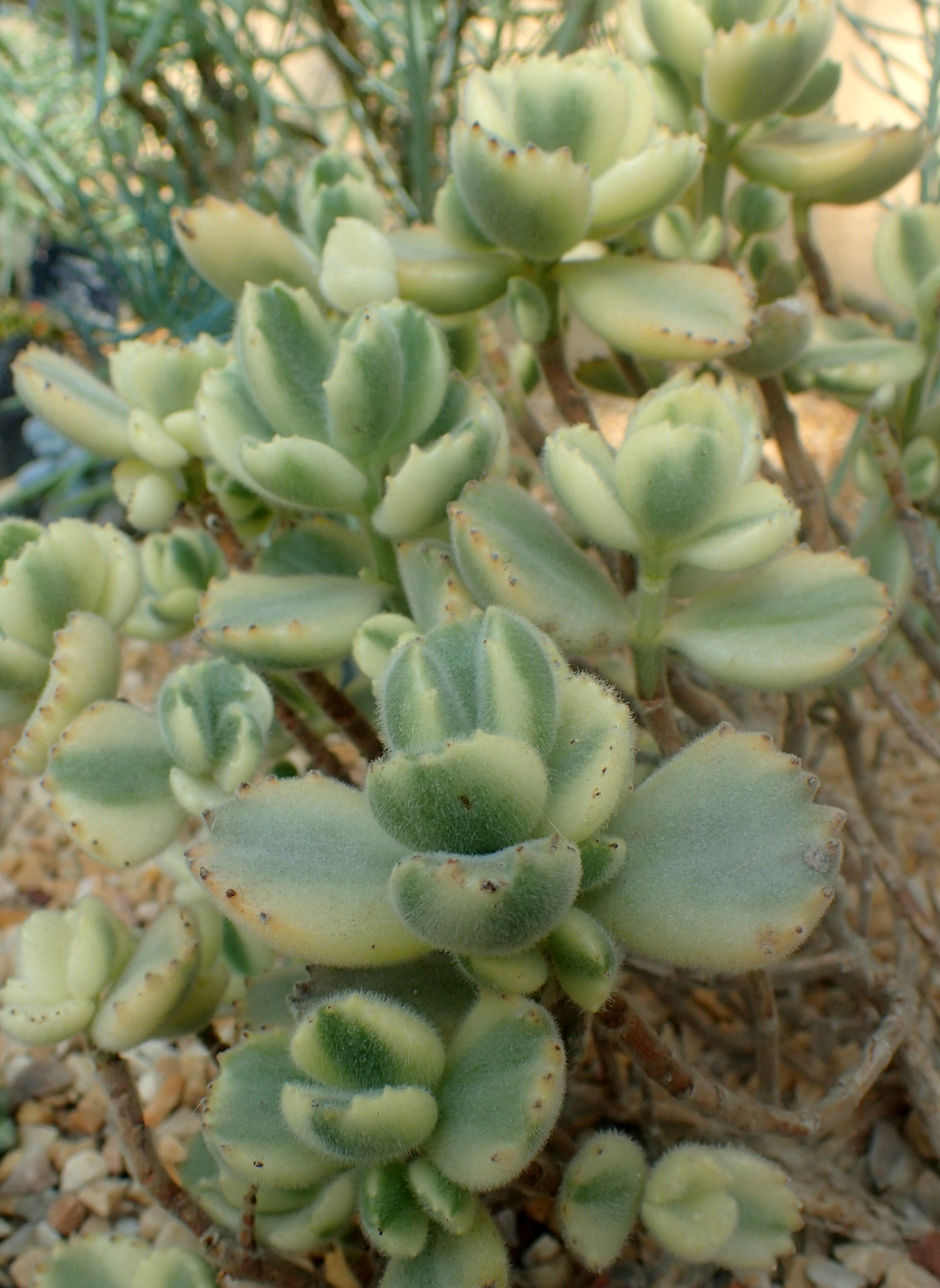
Variegated form

In cultivation they thrive with bright light and ample airflow. Water thoroughly when soil is dry to the touch. Water with caution in winter, as the plant can lose its roots if the soil stays cold and wet for extended periods. They are dormant in summer. Protect from frost to prevent scarring.

In the UK Cotyledon tomentosa subsp. tomentosa has received the Royal Horticultural Society's Award of Garden Merit. It does not tolerate temperatures below 5 °C (41 °F), so in temperate zones must be protected with glass throughout the winter months. However, it may be placed in a warm, sunny position outside during summer.
