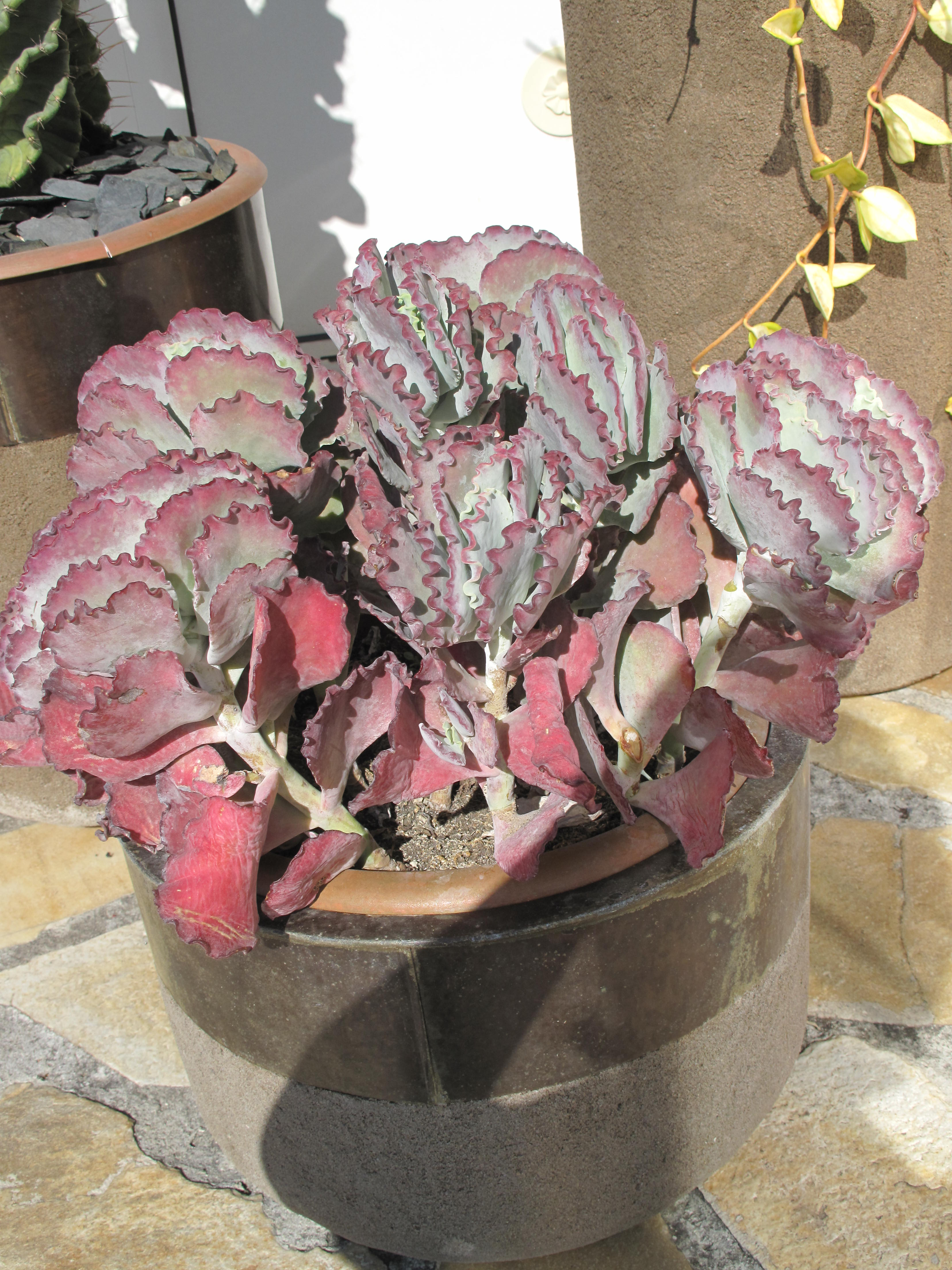

Scientific classification
- Kingdom: Plantae
- Clade: Embryophytes
- Clade: Tracheophytes
- Clade: Angiosperms
- Clade: Eudicots
- Order: Saxifragales
- Family: Crassulaceae
- Genus: Cotyledon
- Species: C. undulata

Binomial name
- Cotyledon undulata Haw.

= Cotyledon undulata =

Species of succulent

Cotyledon undulata, also known as silver crown or silver ruffles, is a small succulent shrub up to 50 cm tall. It has unusual grey undulating leaves that give it a very sculptural shape. Cotyledon undulata is perhaps the most widely grown Cotyledon. The stems are covered with a thick, white, coating. The leaves are shaped like scallop shells, grey-white to blue-grey, with wavy edges and a powdery waxy coating over the whole leaf. The flowers are orange to yellow.
