= Cotyledon chrysantha =

Scientific classification
- Kingdom: Plantae
- Clade: Tracheophytes
- Clade: Angiosperms
- Clade: Eudicots
- Order: Saxifragales
- Family: Crassulaceae
- Genus: Cotyledon
- Species: C. chrysantha

Binomial name
- Cotyledon chrysantha Bornm.

Species of succulent

Cotyledon chrysantha (syn. Umbilicus chrysanthus Boiss. & Heldr.) is an ornamental plant of family Crassulaceae.
