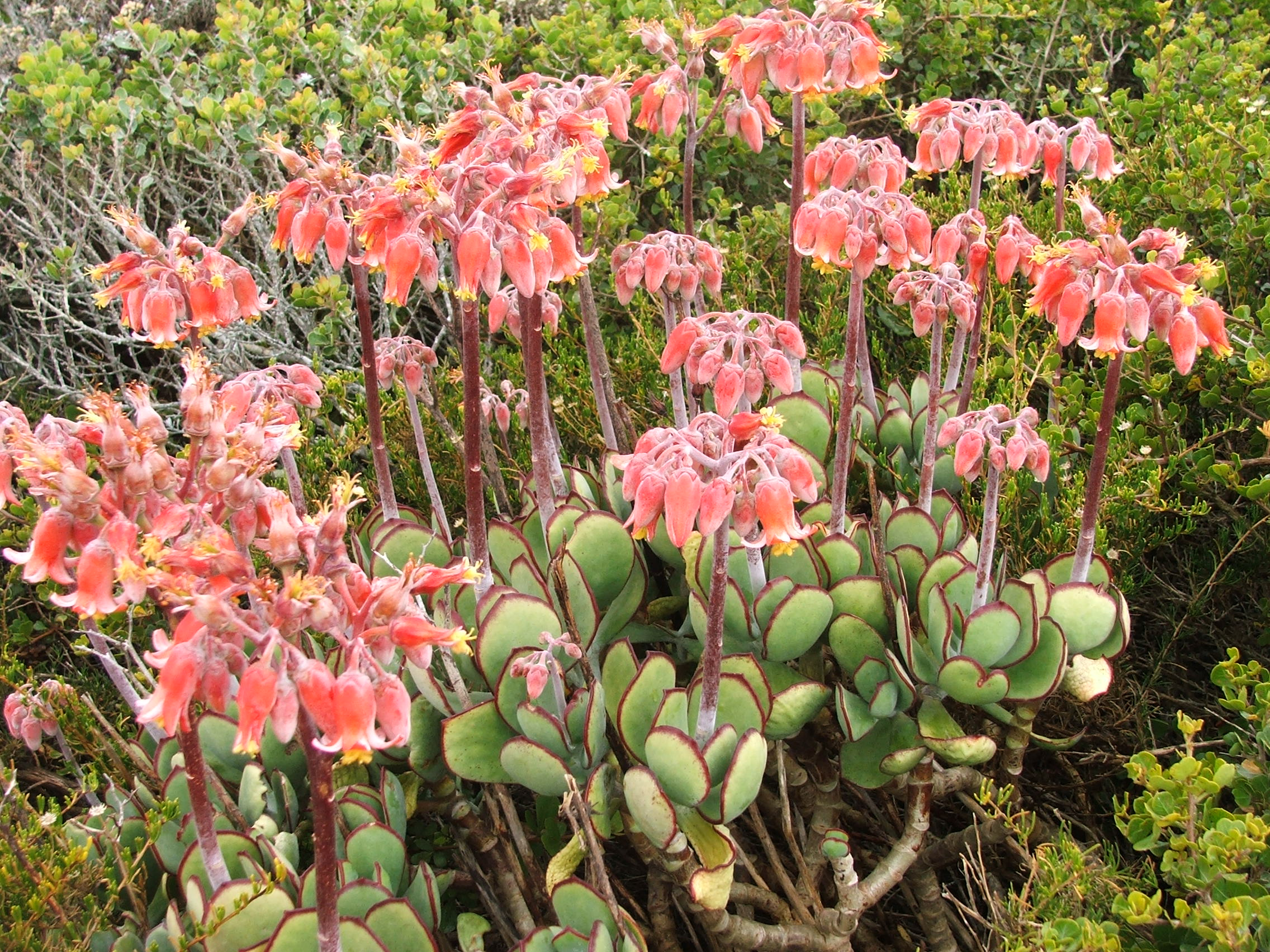
- Cotyledon orbiculata (grey variety)

Scientific classification
- Kingdom: Plantae
- Clade: Tracheophytes
- Clade: Angiosperms
- Clade: Eudicots
- Order: Saxifragales
- Family: Crassulaceae
- Subfamily: Kalanchoideae
- Genus: Cotyledon; Tourn. ex L. 1753

Species
- See text

= Cotyledon (genus) =

Genus of succulents

Cotyledon is one of some 35 genera of succulent plants in the family Crassulaceae. Mostly from Southern Africa, they also occur throughout the drier parts of Africa as far north as the Arabian Peninsula. Ten of its species are mostly confined to South Africa, where unlike Tylecodon, they occur commonly in both the winter and summer rainfall regions. They may be found on coastal flats and rocky hillsides, or as cremnophytes on cliff faces. Their decussate, evergreen leaves are highly variable in shape, even within some species, but the flowers, apart from colour, are very similar.

== Description ==
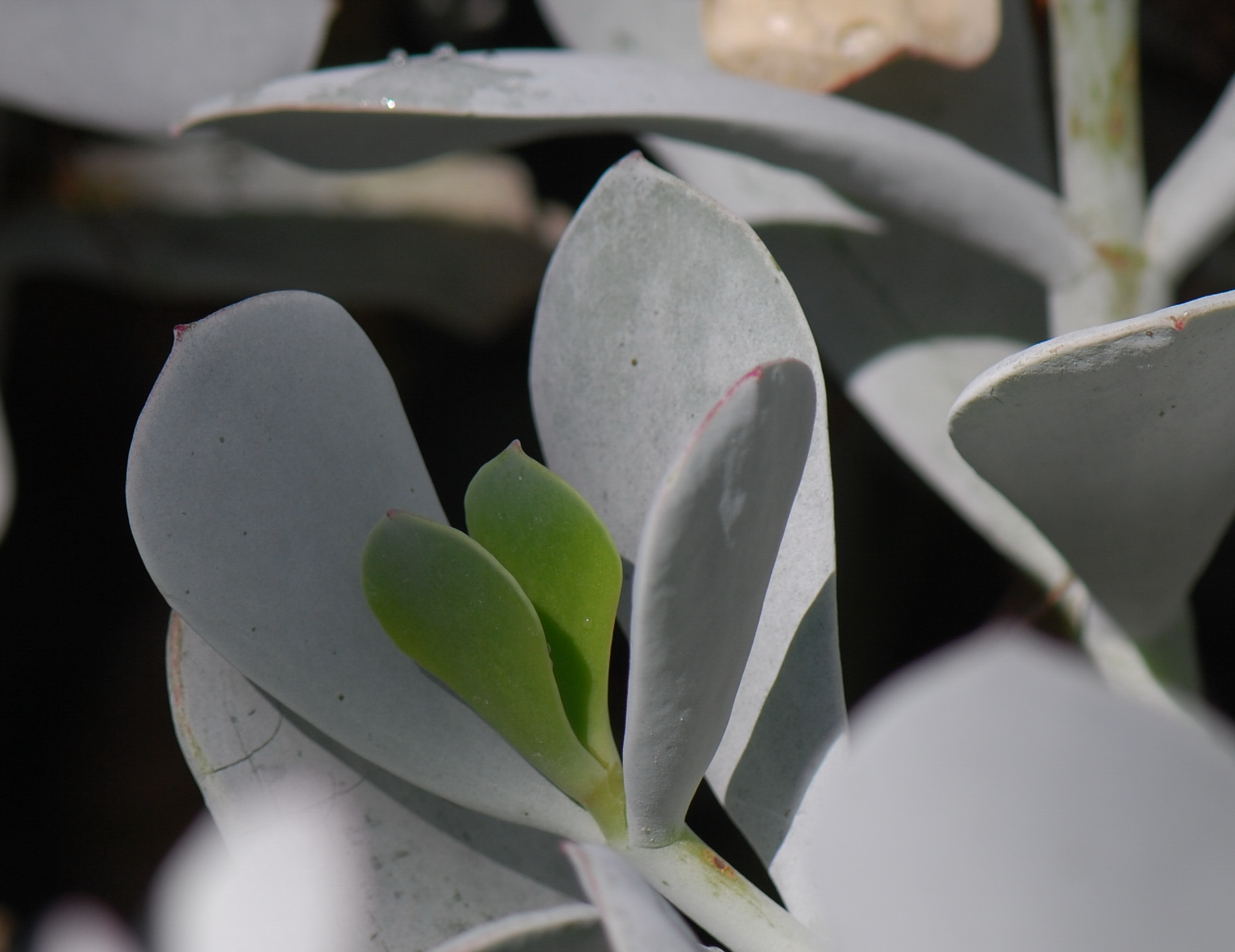
Cotyledon leaves (Cotyledon orbiculata)

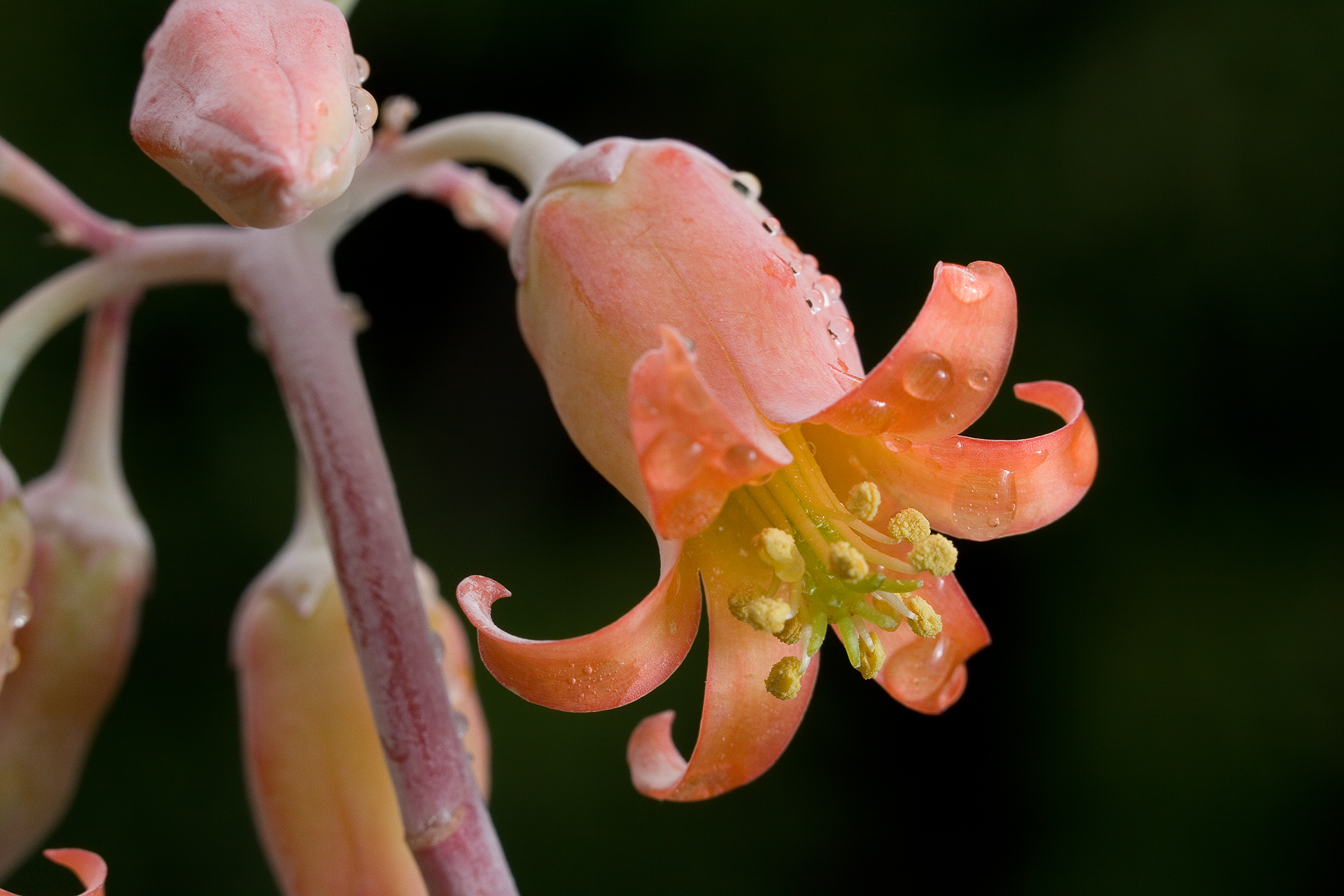
Cotyledon flower (Cotyledon orbiculata)

Members of the genus are shrublets, generally succulent, with fleshily woody, brittle stems and persistent succulent leaves.

The leaves are opposite. Leaf pairs generally are oriented at 90 degrees to their preceding and following pairs, as is common in the family Crassulaceae, but the leaf habit differs from say Tylecodon (in which the leaves are borne in spirals and are deciduous).

The flowers are pendulous and tubular, borne at the tips of stout, rather long peduncles, mainly in short cymes. Calyx 5-partited, corolla 5-lobed. Petals united in a tube or urn that generally is longer than broad, their triangular tips more or less pointed and recurved, 10 stamens arising from corolla near base and projecting or nearly projecting from the corolla. Gynoecium comprises 5 carpels, nearly or quite free, each carpel tapering into a slender style with an obliquely capitate stigma. Each carpel contains many small (typically less than 1 milligramme when ripe) globular, brown seeds.

== Taxonomy ==
Together with Tylecodon, Kalanchoe and Adromischus, it forms a sister clade to the family's basal Crassula clade. Until the 1960s, some 150 species were included in the genus Cotyledon, but subsequently it was split into at least Adromischus, Dudleya, Rosularia, and Tylecodon, leaving probably less than two dozen species in Cotyledon. Of these, about four are characteristically fynbos plants.

== Cultivation and uses ==
Most plants in the genus, and those that used to be included in the genus Cotyledon, are poisonous, even dangerously so. Some have been implicated in stock losses among goats, pigs and poultry. However, many species have long been used in traditional medicine. They have been applied for many purposes, ranging from magic charms to removal of corns.

Cotyledon species are grown as garden and indoor subjects, practically independent of irrigation in all but full desert conditions, though they cannot survive poor light or bad drainage. Pests that affect them include sucking bugs, members of the suborder Auchenorrhyncha such as the mealy bug (Pseudococcus), and similar insects. The inflorescences of the larger species are sometimes used as components of dried arrangements in floral design.

== Species list ==
Species include (among others):

- Cotyledon adscendens
- Cotyledon barbeyi
- Cotyledon campanulata
- Cotyledon cuneata
- Cotyledon chrysantha
- Cotyledon elisae
- Cotyledon galpinii
- Cotyledon orbiculata – pig's ear, round-leafed navelwort
- Cotyledon papilaris
- Cotyledon tomentosa - bear's paw
- Cotyledon tomentosa subsp. ladismithiensis
- Cotyledon undulata - silver crown, silver ruffles
- Cotyledon velutina
- Cotyledon woodii

== Gallery ==
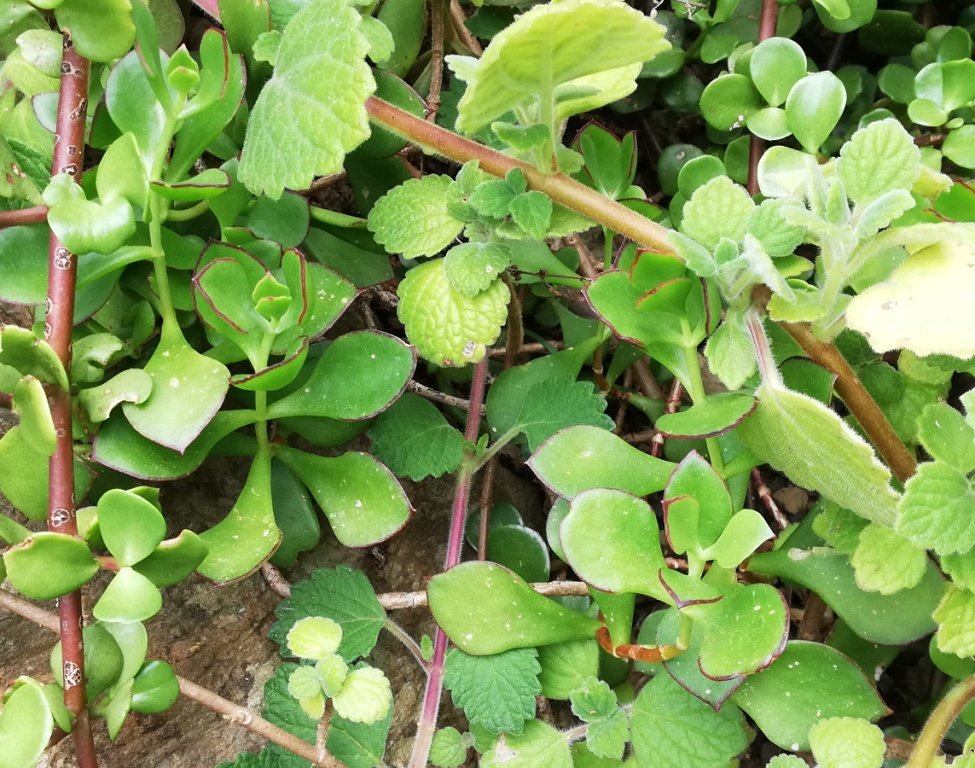
Cotyledon adscendens, a decumbent, sparsely branched shrub with leaves that are concave on their upper surface.

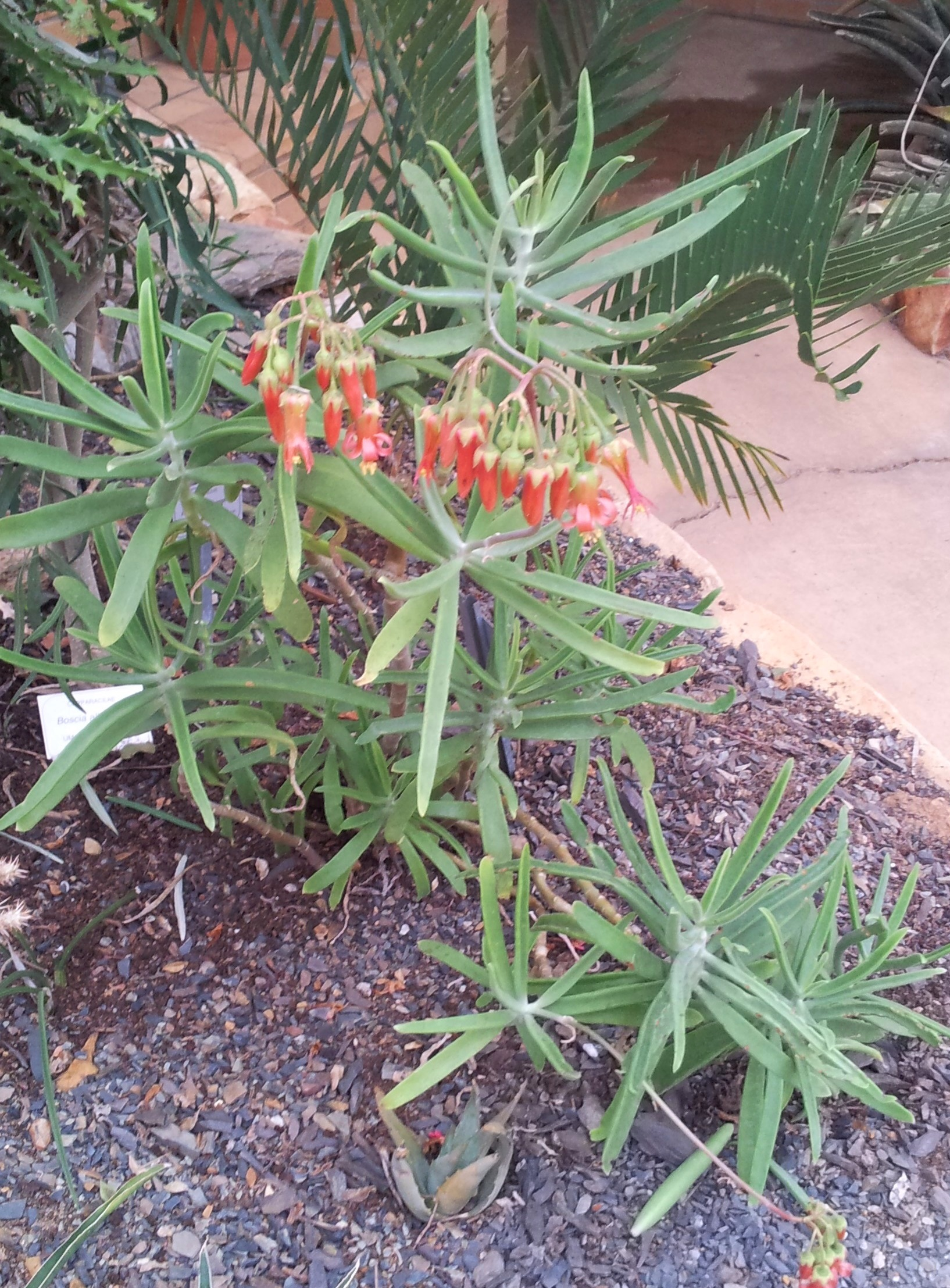
Cotyledon barbeyi is a small shrub with cuneate leaf-bases.

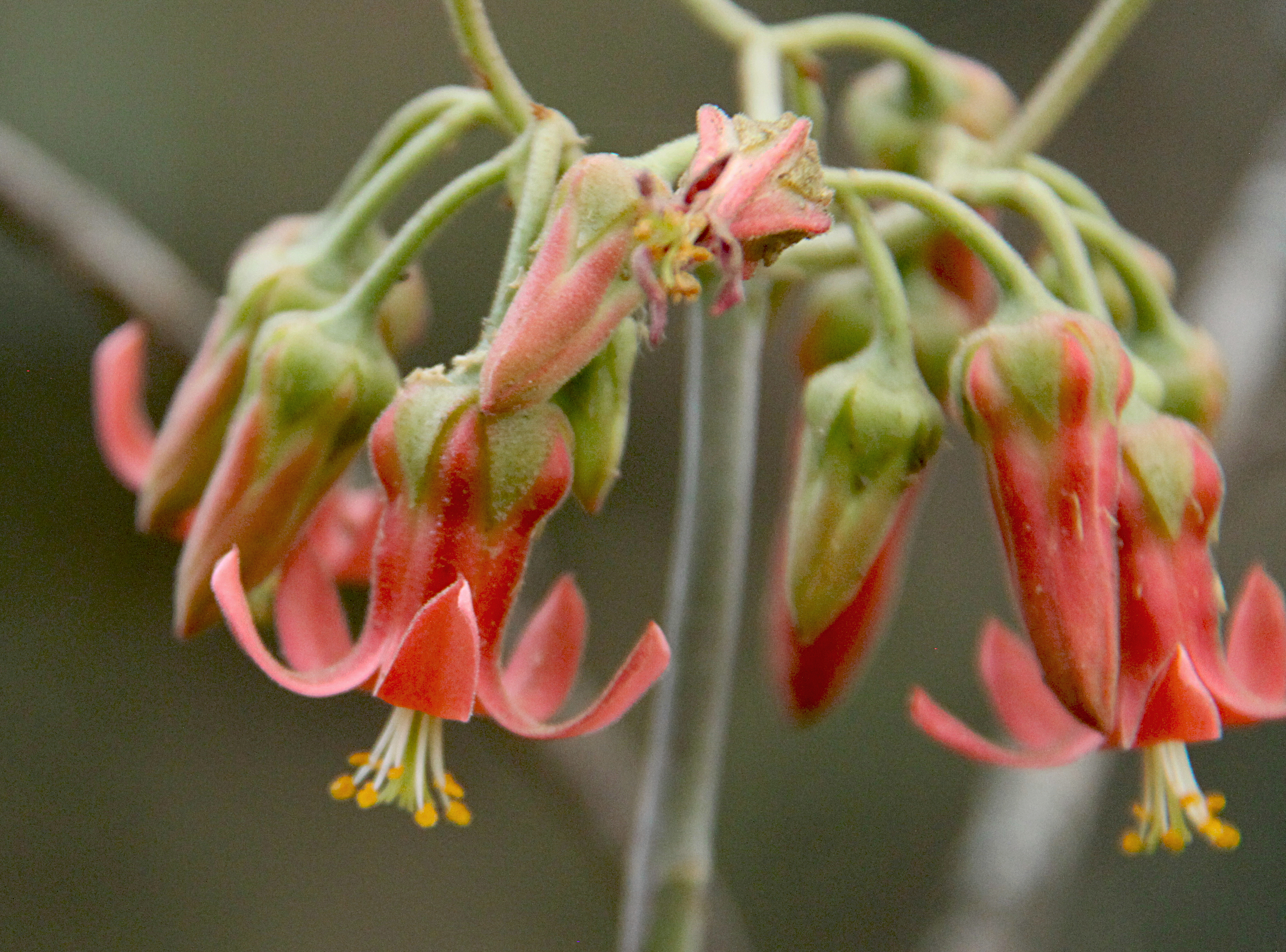
The flowers of Cotyledon barbeyi are inflated between the calyx lobes.

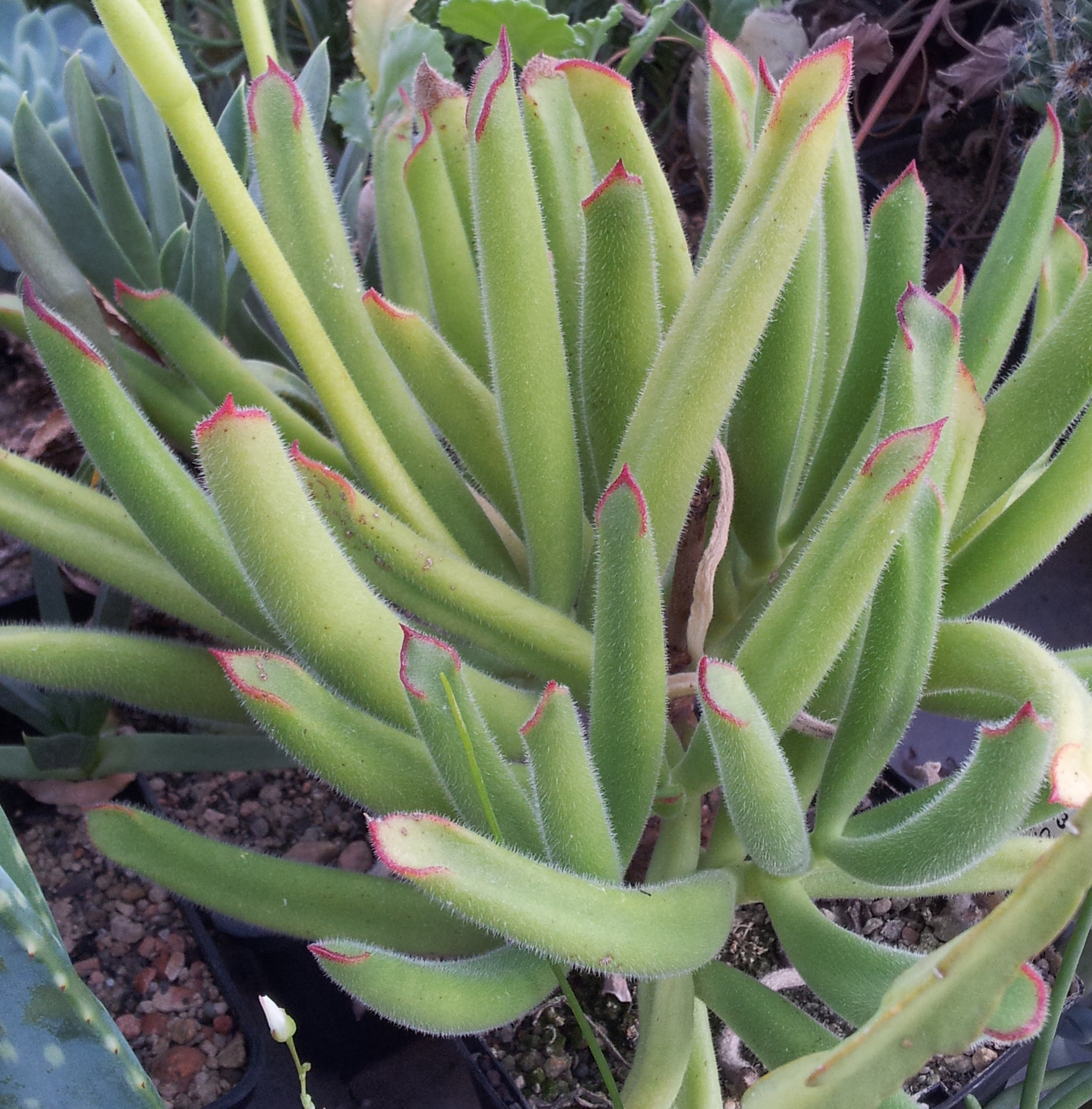
Cotyledon campanulata has elongated, viscid, terete leaves.

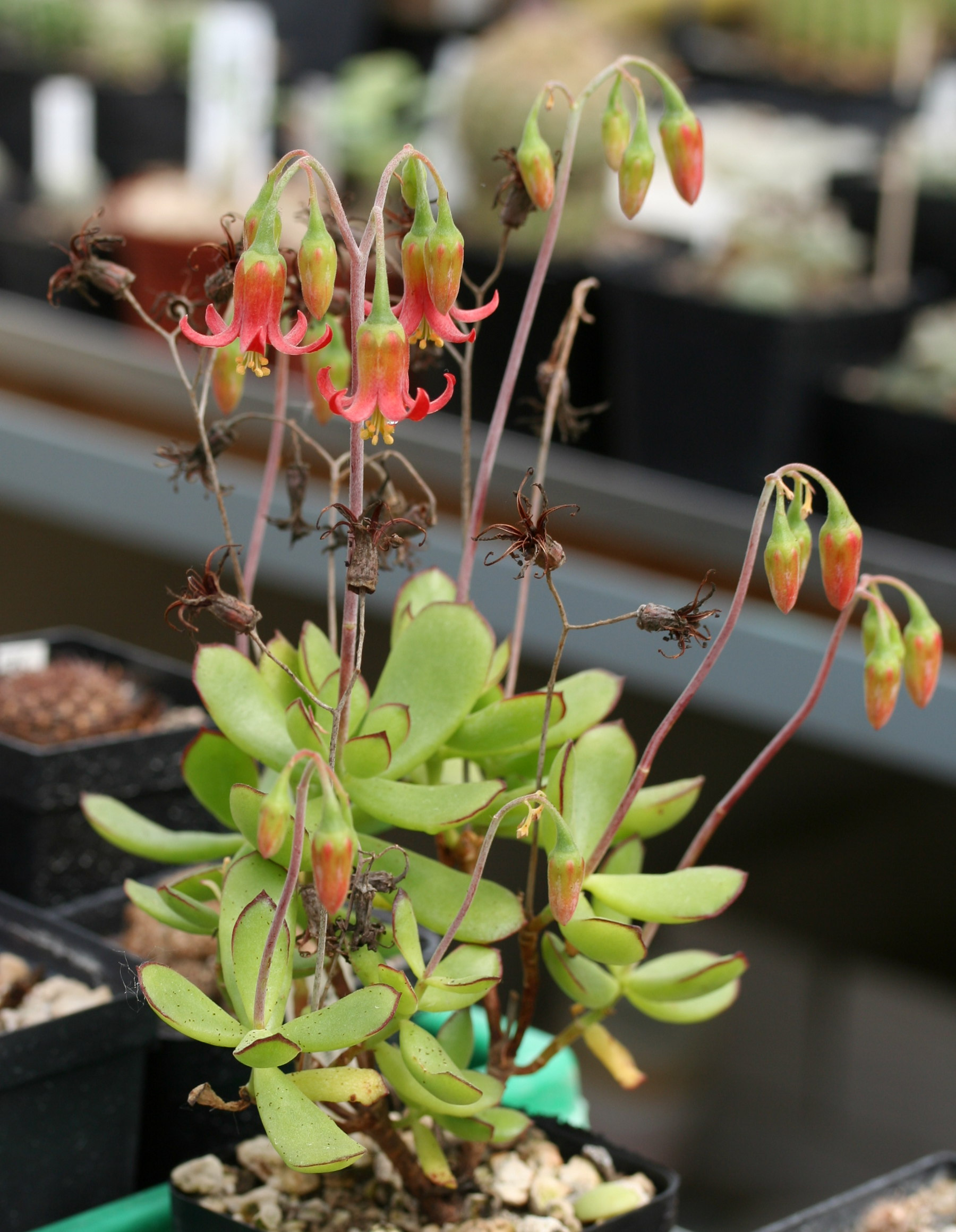
The tiny Cotyledon eliseae has sticky leaves, a long compound inflorescence and narrow flowers.

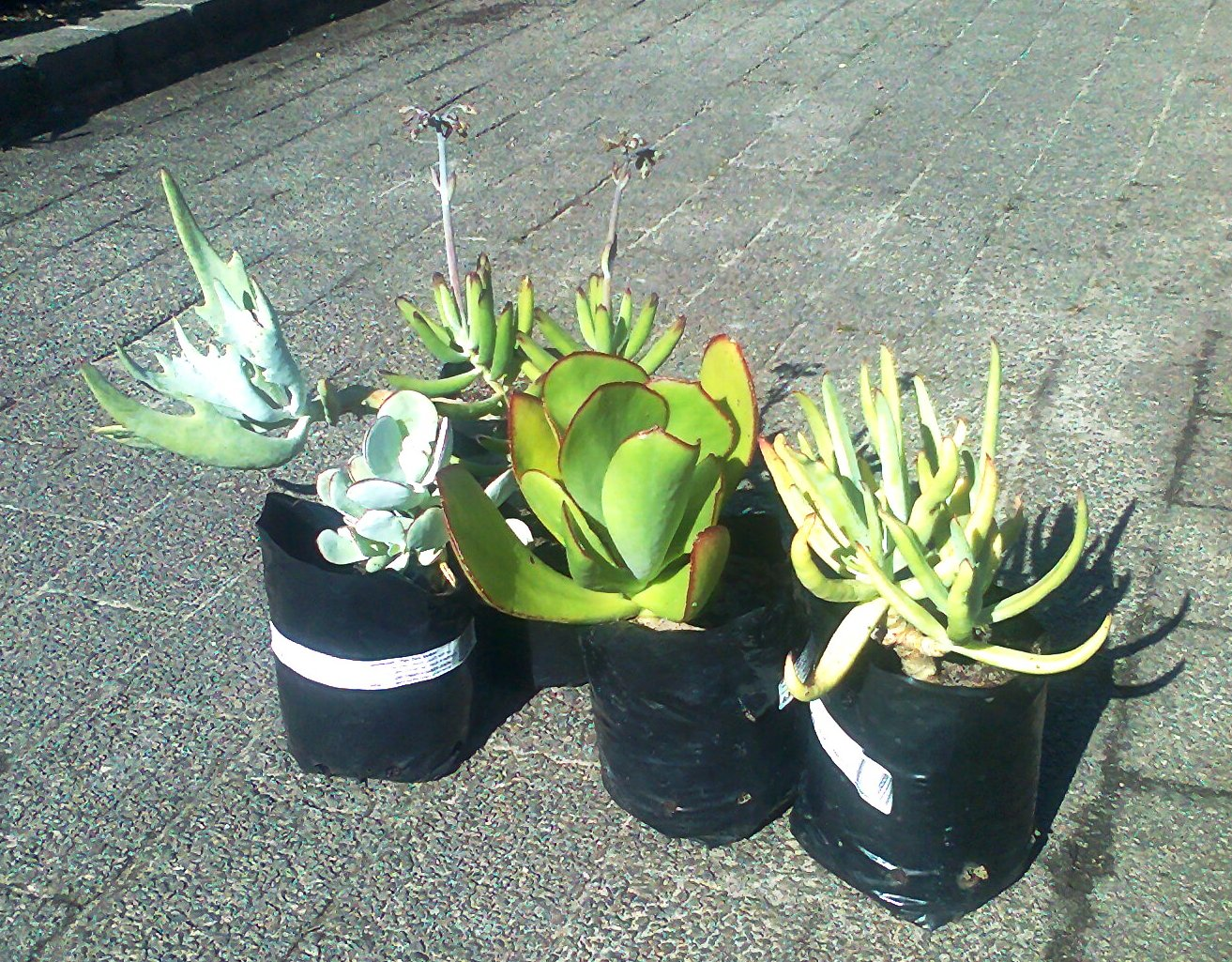
Cotyledon orbiculata is an extremely variable species, with a tall inflorescence (20–40 cm) and 10-15mm long lobes on its non-inflated corolla.

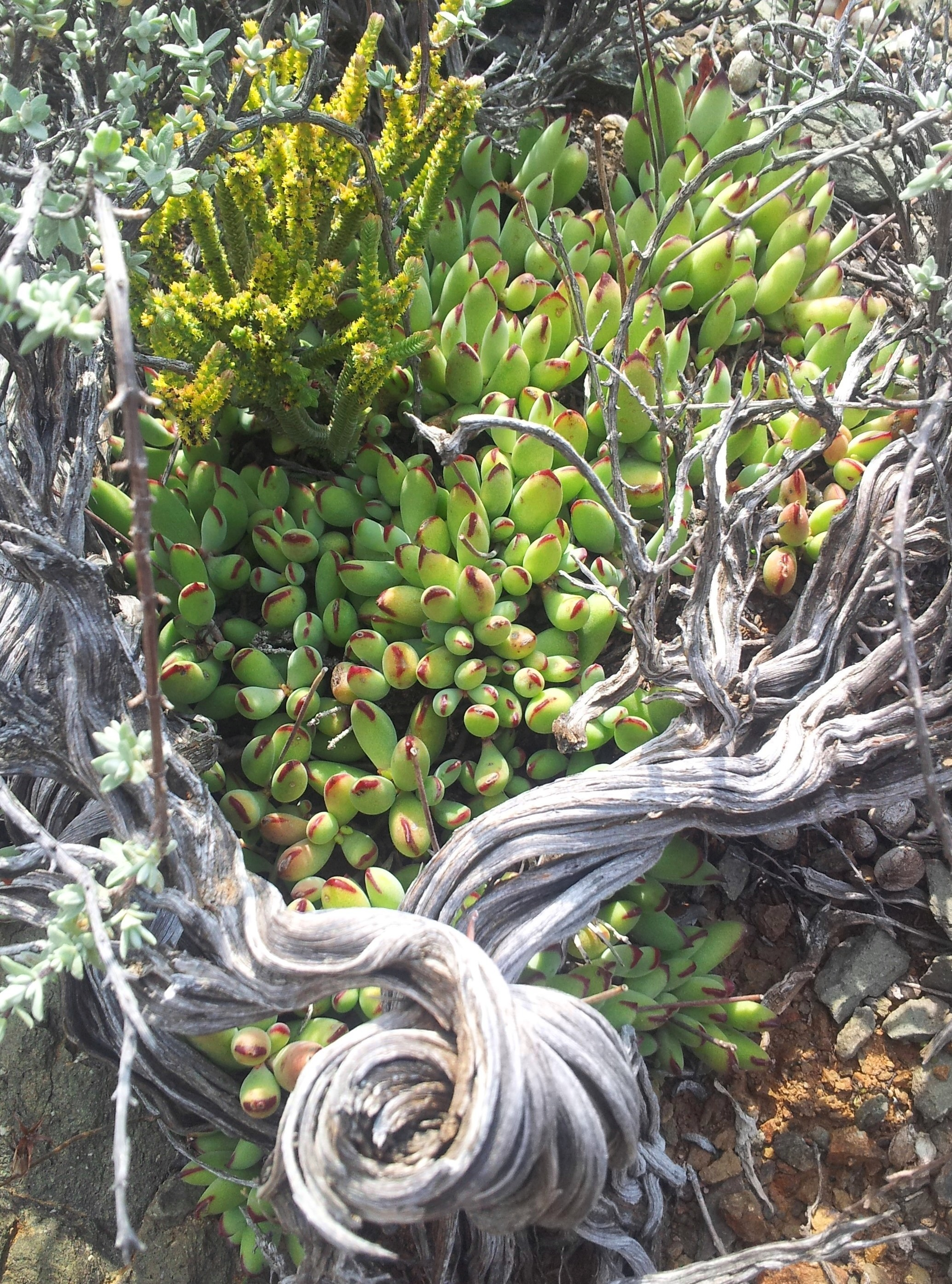
Cotyledon papillaris is a spreading, procumbent species. Its short flowers have long, yellowish lobes.

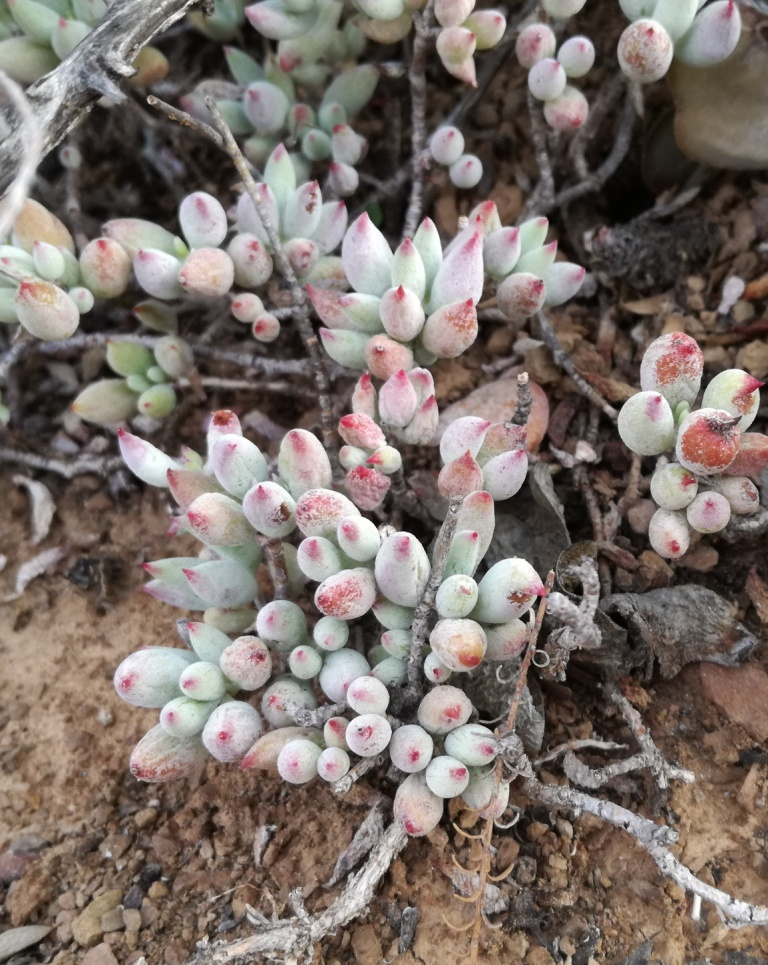
Cotyledon papillaris (grey form)

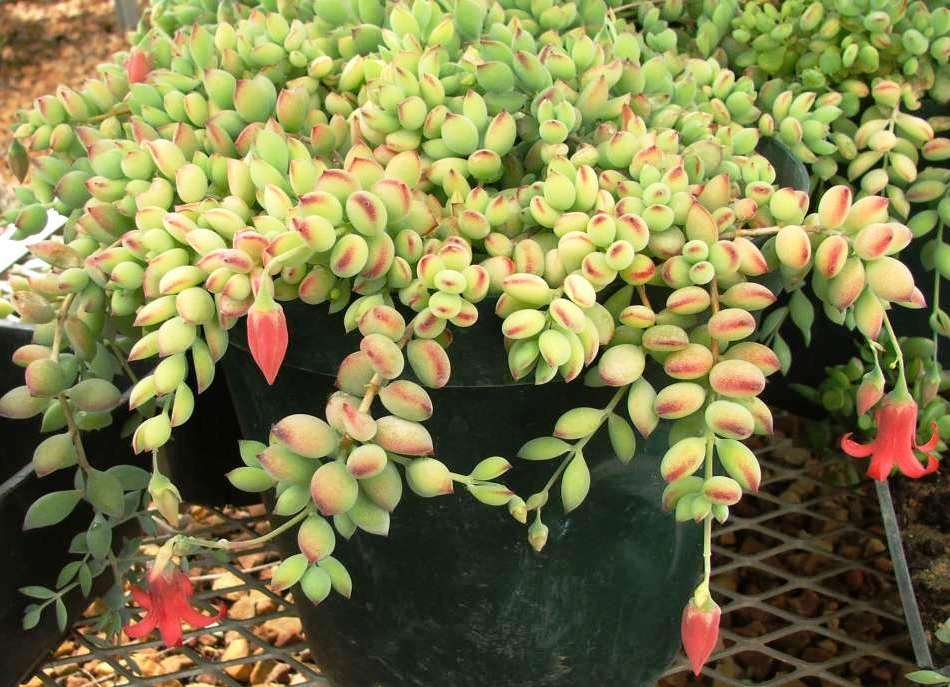
Cotyledon pendens has slender, dangling stems and almost ovate leaves.

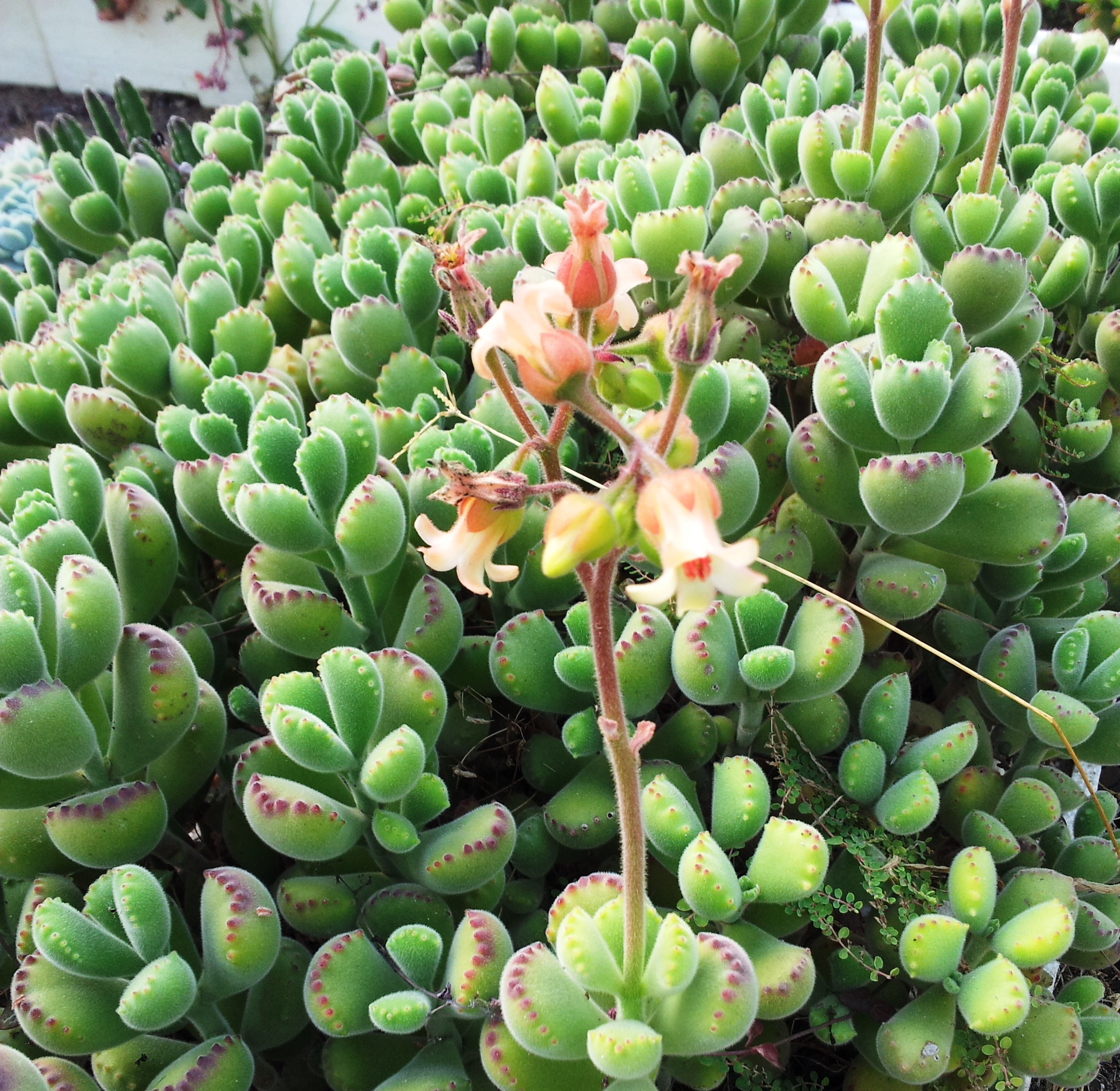
Cotyledon tomentosa ("Bears Paw") has hairy ("tomentose") leaves.

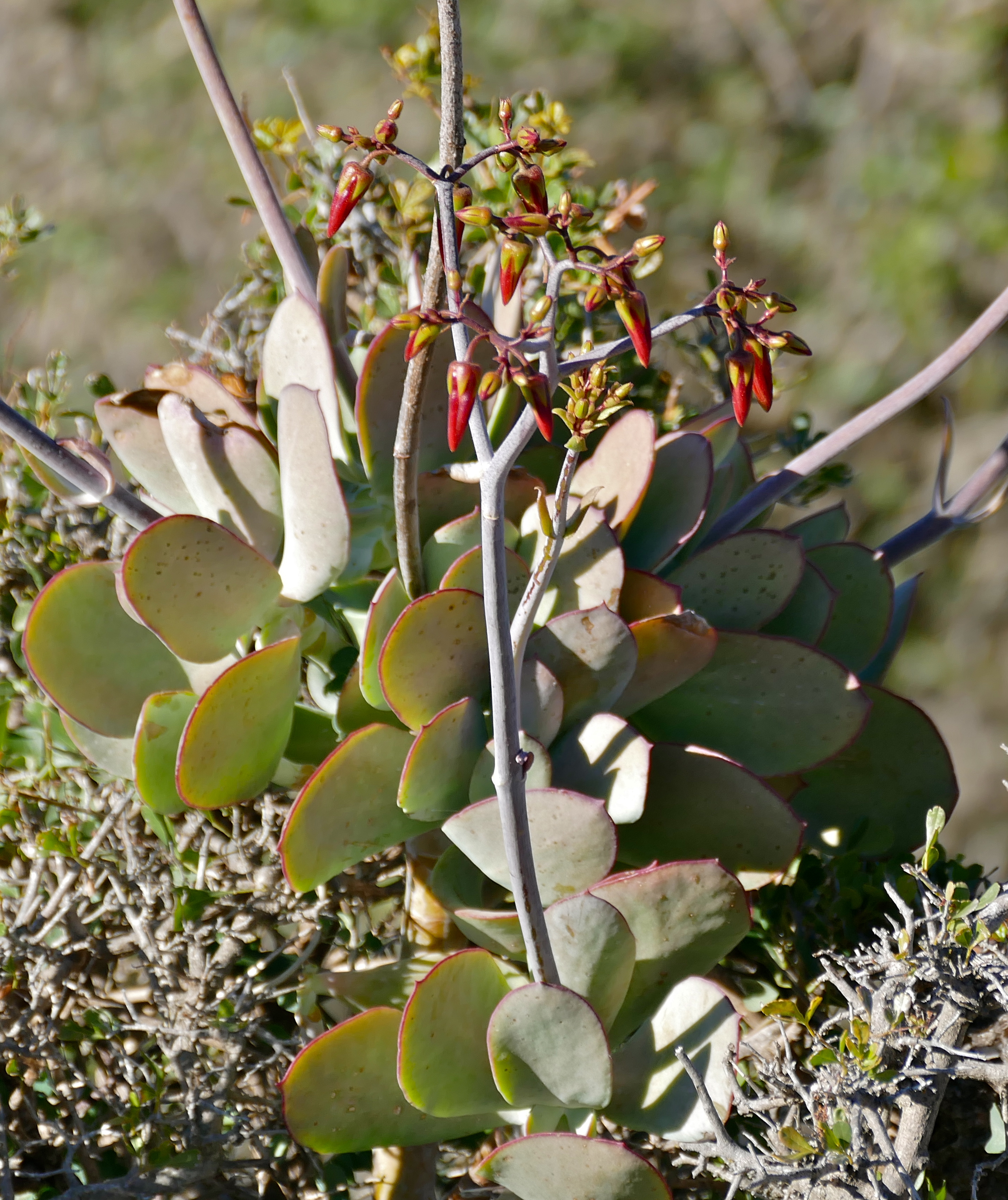
Cotyledon velutina has auriculate leaves below its inflorescence.

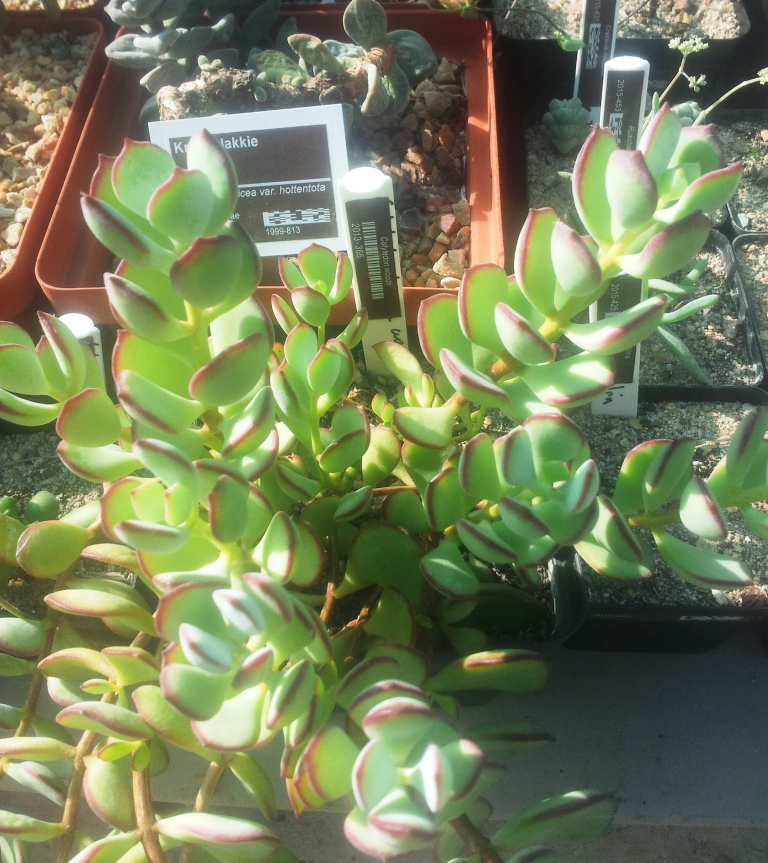
Cotyledon woodii is an erect shrub (up to 1,2m) with solitary red flowers and glabrous leaves.

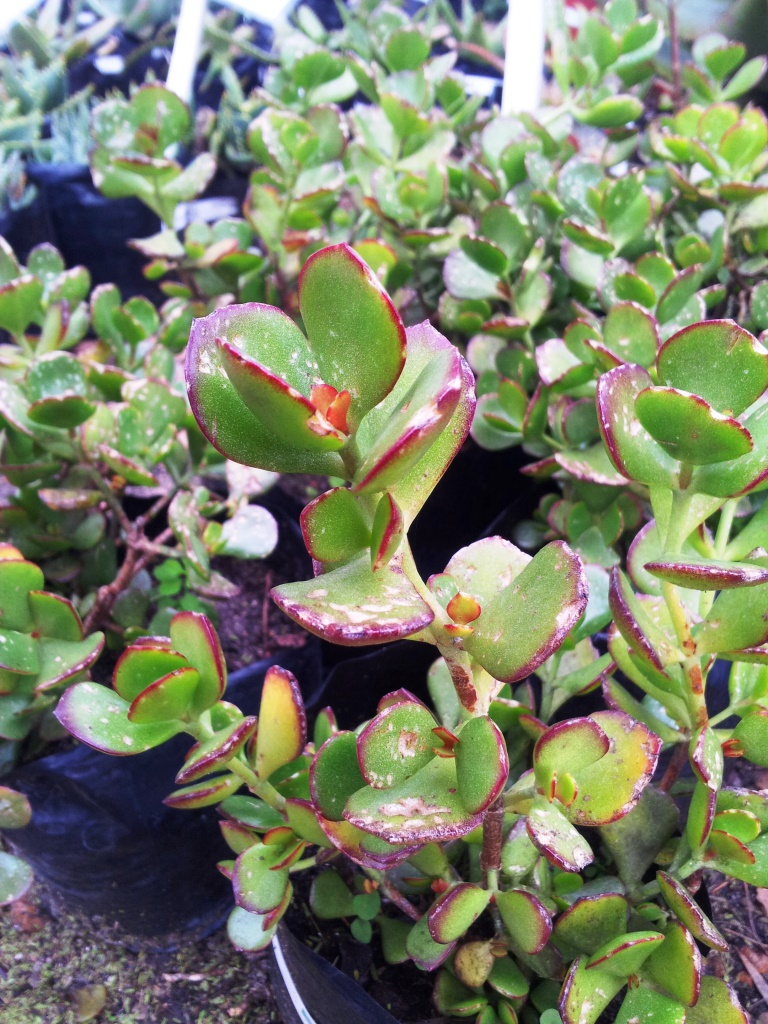
Cotyledon woodii (green-leaved form).

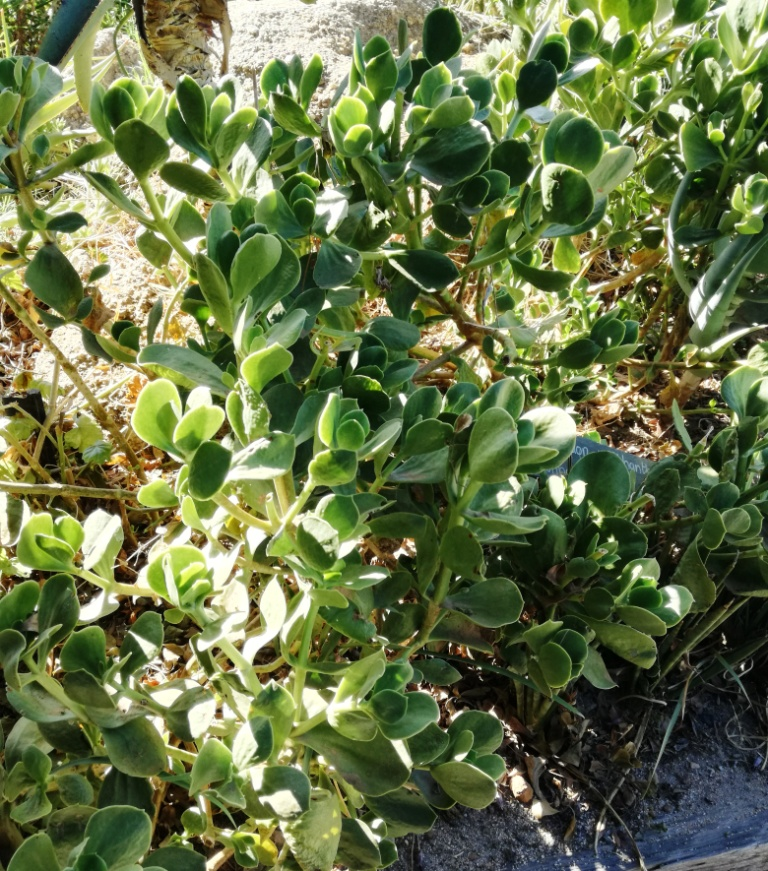
Cotyledon xanthantha
