= Church Mountain (Washington) =

Mountain in Washington (state), United States

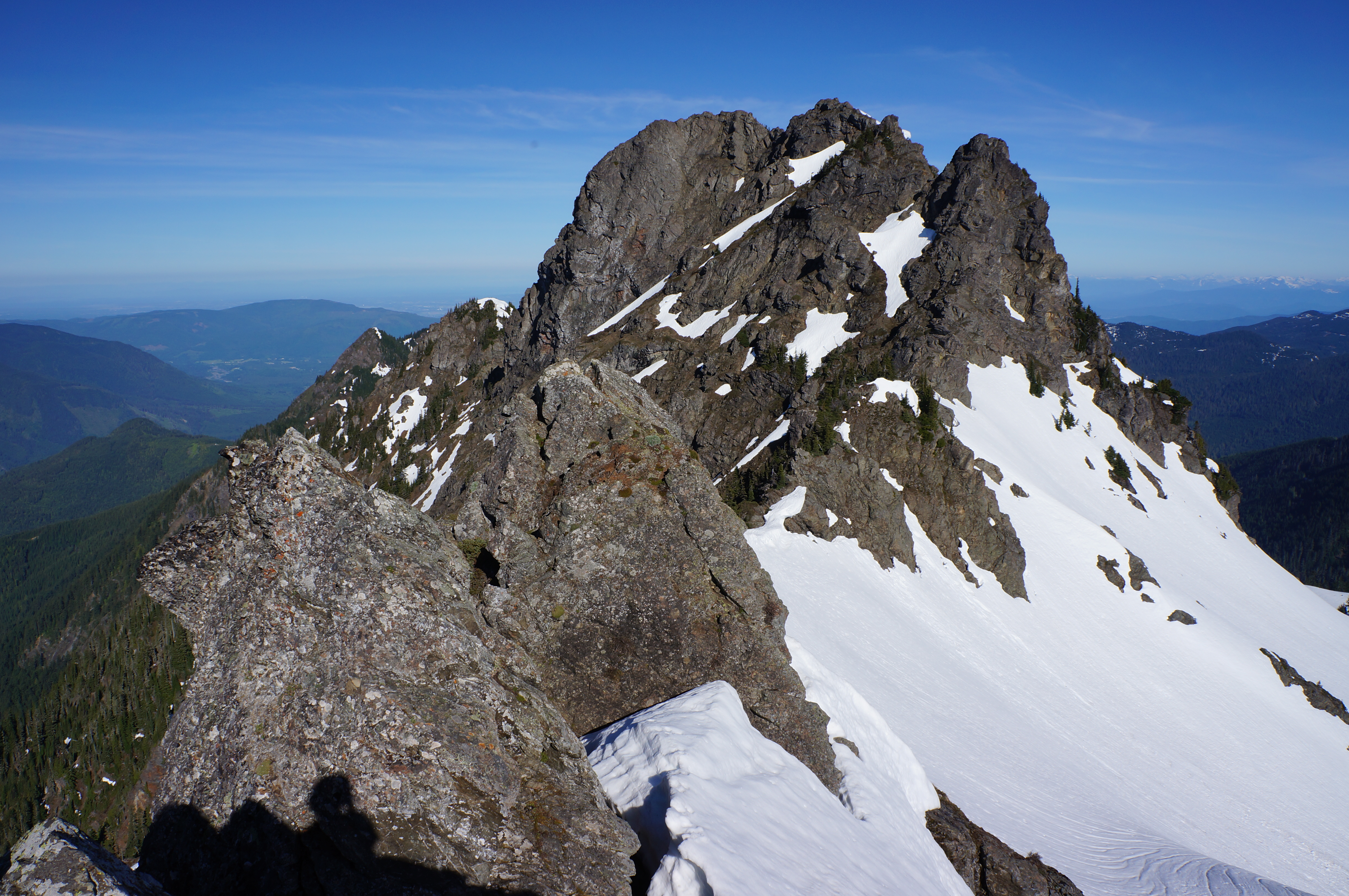
- True summit of Church Mountain from the lookout site

Highest point
- Elevation: 6,315 ft (1,925 m)
- Prominence: 1,115 ft (340 m)
- Coordinates: 48°55′36″N 121°52′56″W

Geography
- Location within Washington (state) Location within the United States
- Parent range: Cascade Range
- Topo map: USGS Glacier

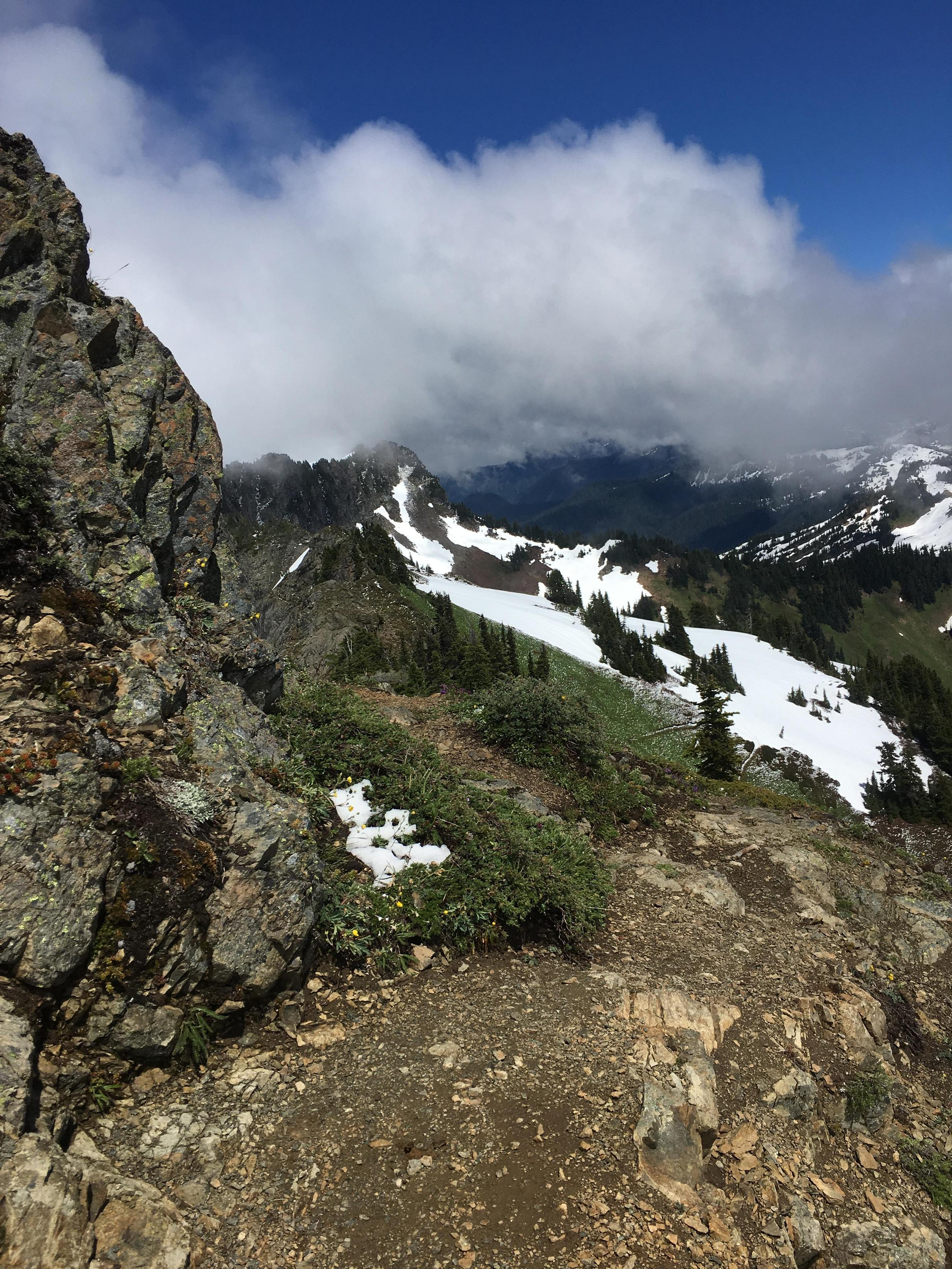
Looking Southeast from the end of the trail near summit.

Church Mountain is a 6,315-foot (1,925-metre) mountain summit located north of Mount Baker in Whatcom County in the U.S. state of Washington. The summit affords a 360 degree view of the area, which includes Mount Baker to the south and Mount Shuksan to the southeast. Church Mountain is the line parent of Bearpaw Mountain.

== Climate ==
Church Mountain is located in the marine west coast climate zone of western North America. Most weather fronts originate in the Pacific Ocean, and travel northeast toward the Cascade Mountains. As fronts approach the North Cascades, they are forced upward by the peaks of the Cascade Range, causing them to drop their moisture in the form of rain or snowfall onto the Cascades (Orographic lift). As a result, the west side of the North Cascades experiences high precipitation, especially during the winter months in the form of snowfall. Due to its temperate climate and proximity to the Pacific Ocean, areas west of the Cascade Crest very rarely experience temperatures below 0 °F (−18 °C) or above 80 °F (27 °C). During winter months, weather is usually cloudy, but, due to high pressure systems over the Pacific Ocean that intensify during summer months, there is often little or no cloud cover during the summer. Precipitation runoff from the mountain drains into tributaries of the Nooksack River.

== See also ==
- Mountain peaks of North America
- Mountain peaks of the United States
