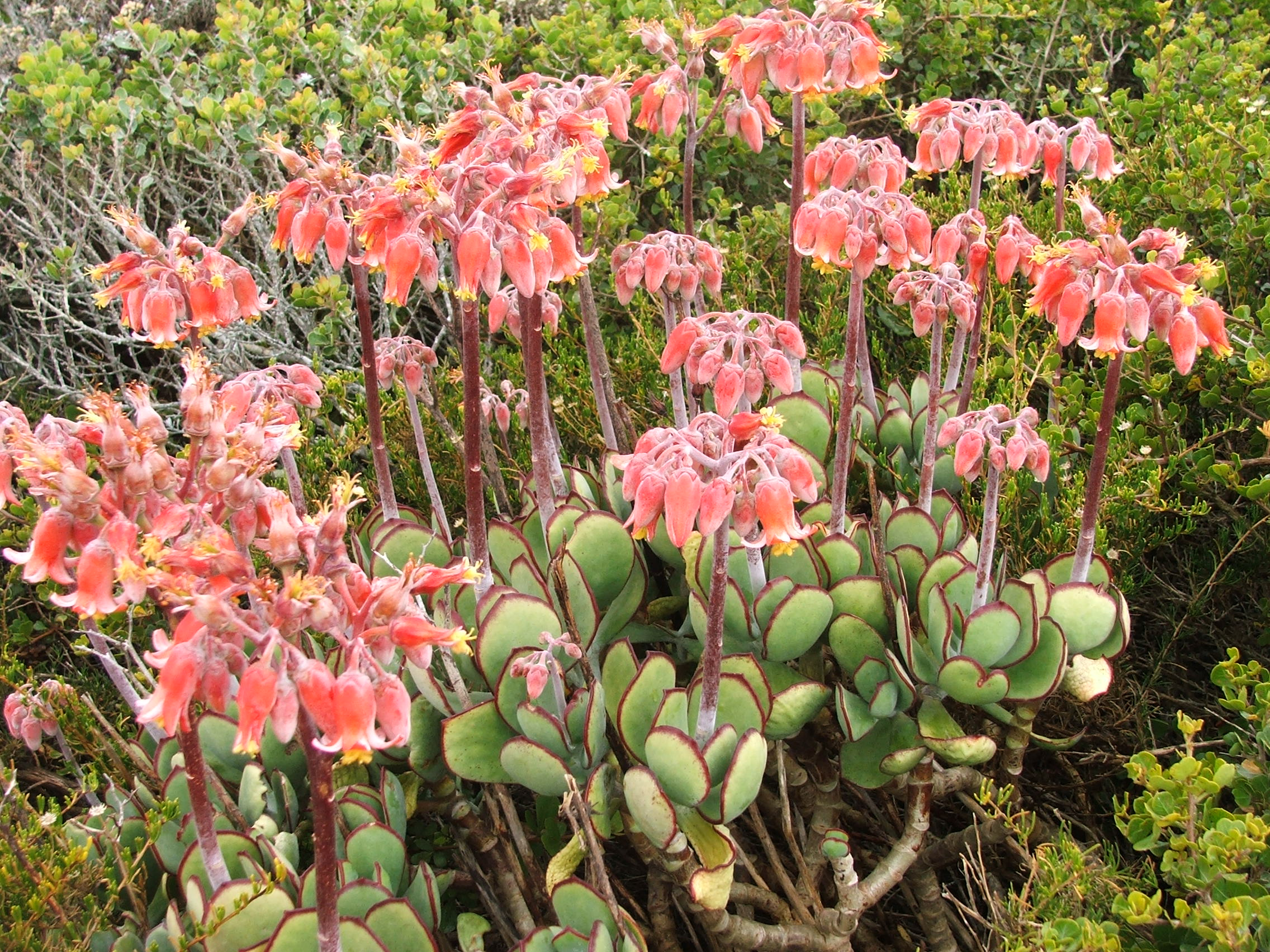

Scientific classification
- Kingdom: Plantae
- Clade: Embryophytes
- Clade: Tracheophytes
- Clade: Spermatophytes
- Clade: Angiosperms
- Clade: Eudicots
- Order: Saxifragales
- Family: Crassulaceae
- Genus: Cotyledon
- Species: C. orbiculata

Binomial name
- Cotyledon orbiculata L.
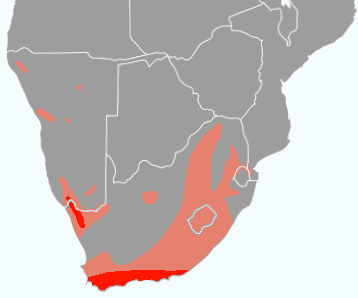
- approximate native range

Synonyms
- Cotyledon elata Haw. Cotyledon ovata Haw. Cotyledon ramosa Haw. Cotyledon oblonga Haw. = C. o. var. oblonga (Haw.) DC.

= Cotyledon orbiculata =

Pig's ear

Species of plant

Cotyledon orbiculata, commonly known as pig's ear or round-leafed navel-wort, is a South African succulent plant belonging to the genus Cotyledon.

== Description ==
Cotyledon orbiculata is an extremely variable species, one that grows to approximately 1.3 m (4.3 ft) in height. It has gray-green leaves (up to 13 by 7 cm (5.1 by 2.8 in)), which naturally develop a white, powdery substance (known as farina) on their surfaces; this farina helps reflect sunlight and conserve water. If a specific leaf area is brushed against (or even gently disturbed), the farina will noticeably become smudged. While this powder does not regenerate when disturbed or wiped off, this is normally not detrimental and very rarely unsightly. The majority of succulent plants will, ultimately, lose and replace their older leaves with time. Ironically, water (as dew, marine layer/fog, mist, rain, or even garden hose or hand-watering), does not seem to wash the farina off, and it reappears again as the leaves are drying. The shape of the leaves was thought to have a resemblance to a pig's ear, thus the common name.

The bell-shaped flowers, which appear in winter, are usually a blood orange-red or a paler salmon-orange; yellow varieties also exist. To the untrained eye, the blossoms may resemble the blooms of the distantly-related Kalanchoe, which is also native to Africa. However, Cotyledon produce tubular, upside-down bells which are smaller, usually less than 3 cm (1.2 in) in length; Cotyledon also tend to flower in denser clusters than Kalanchoe. They also hang and droop from the top of a 60 cm (24 in)-tall stalk. The tubular flower crown has no bulges, is approximately 20 millimeters long, and up to 9 millimeters in diameter. The bent, back crown-tips are orange, red or yellow, and are 12 millimeters long. The stamens protrude 2 to 3 millimeters. The yellow anthers are elongated and approx. 1.75 millimeters in diameter. The semi-transversely elongated nectar scales are dull and yellowish-green, and are 1.5 × 2 millimeters in size. The 10 stamens are attached to the base of the corolla (2 per petal), and the 5 carpels each have a style longer than the ovary.

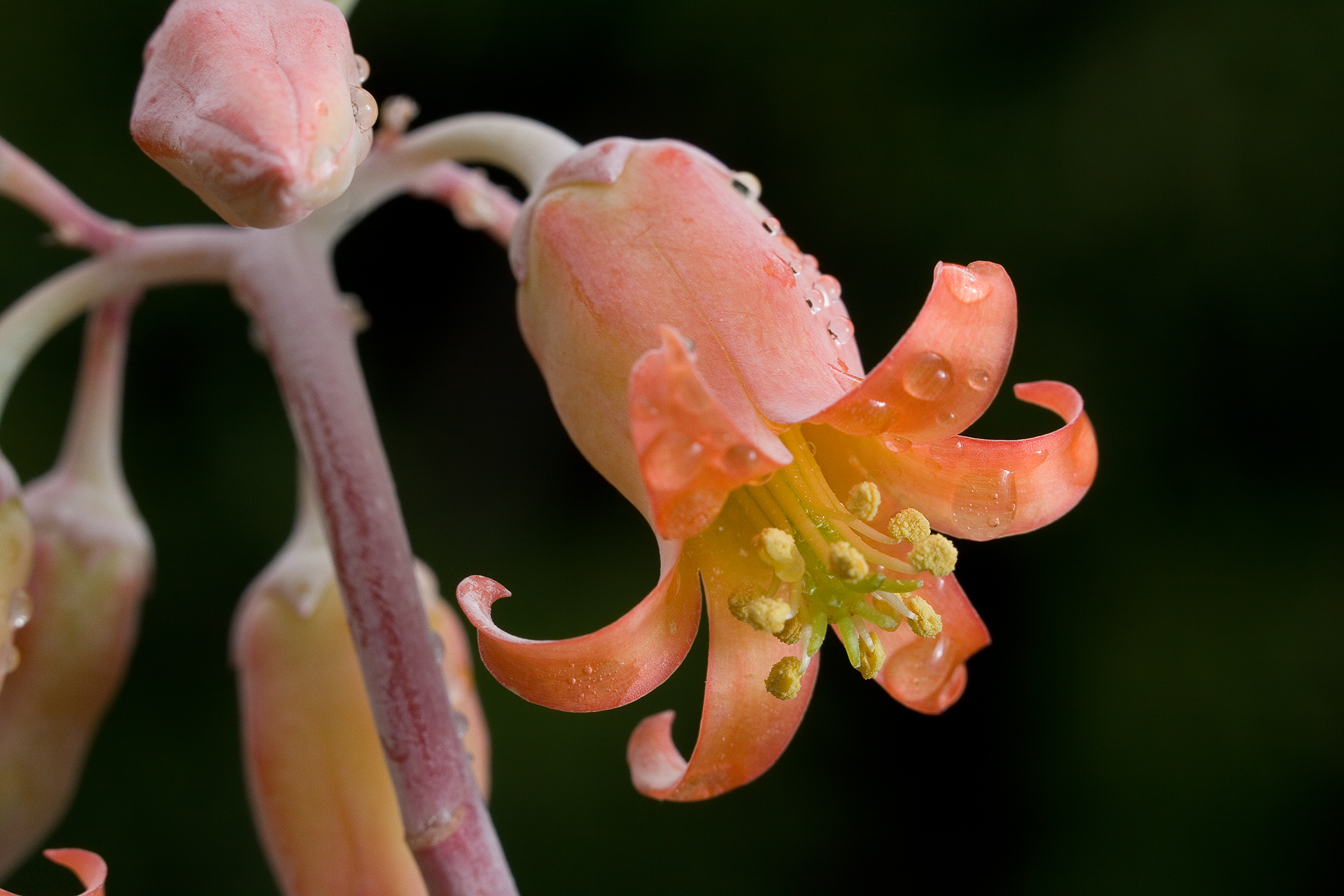
Flower

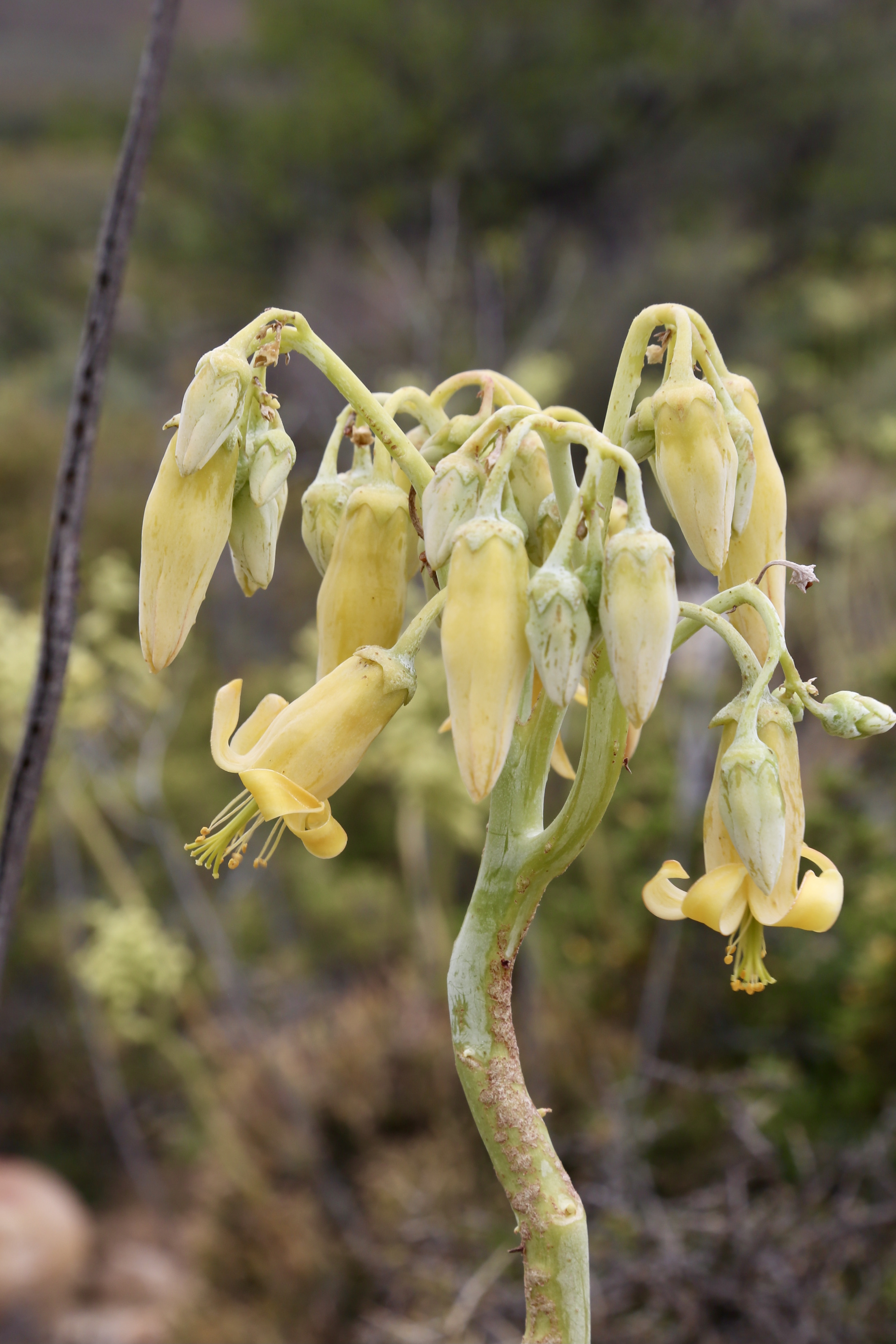
Yellow form

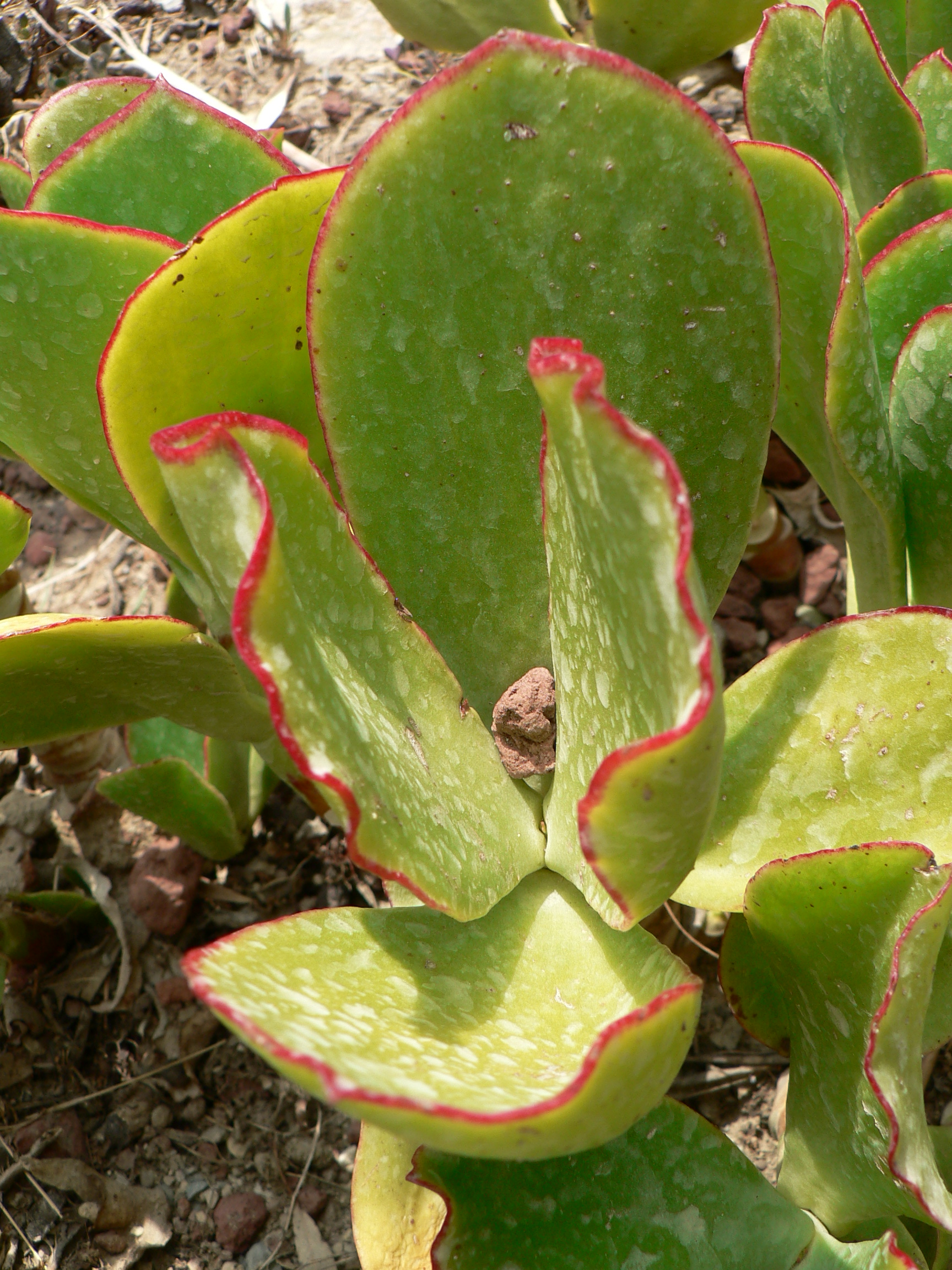
Leaves (green variety)

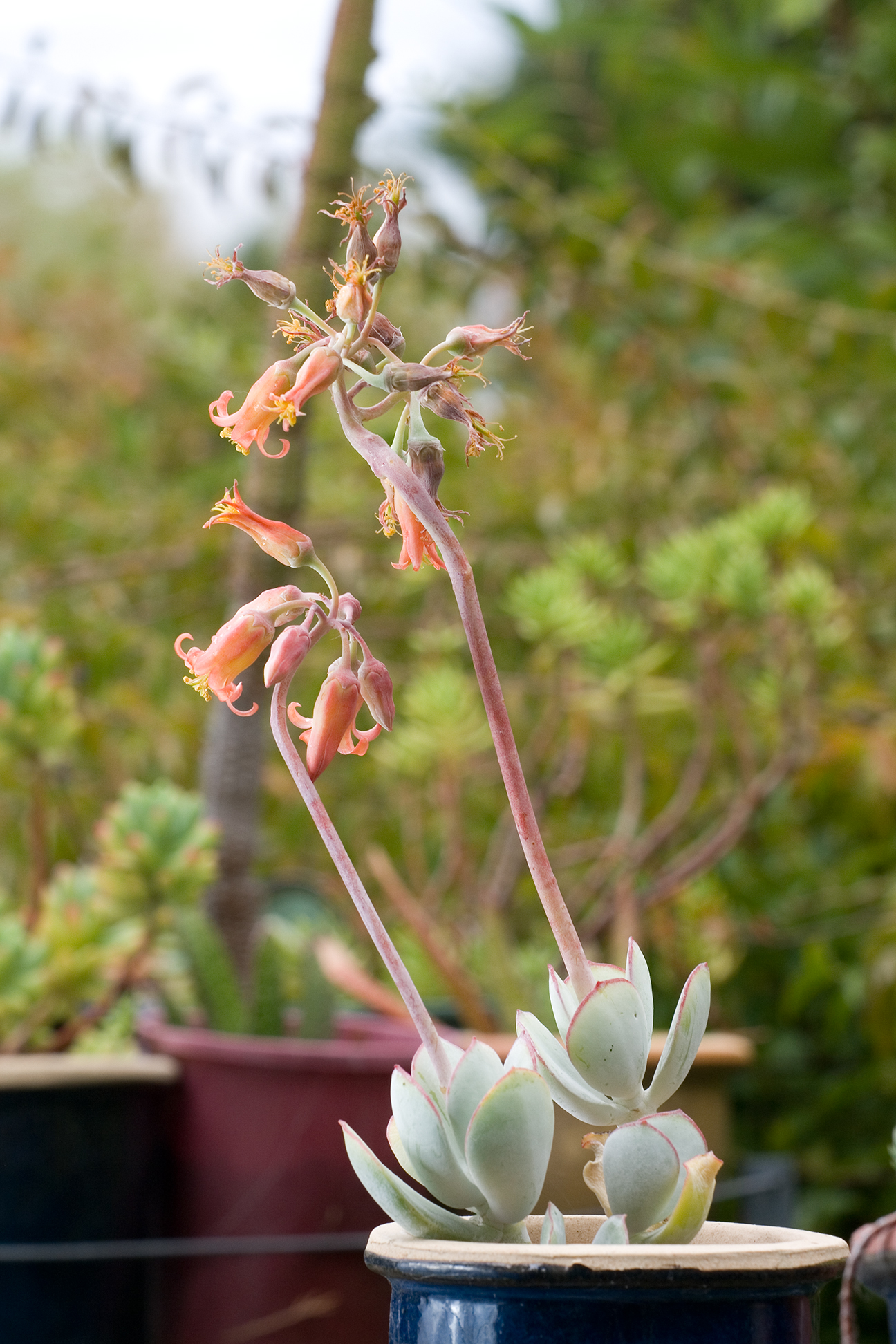
Grey variety in cultivation

=== Varieties and cultivars ===
This diverse species includes a large number of hybrids and cultivated forms, some of which may show a distinct resemblance to Kalanchoe thyrsiflora or K. luciae.

Recognised varieties include:

- Cotyledon orbiculata var. flanaganii (Schönl. & Baker f.) Toelken ― with elongated leaves in whorls
- Cotyledon orbiculata var. oblonga (Haw.) DC. ― defined by its red leaf-margins and 20–50 cm inflorescence
- Cotyledon orbiculata var. spuria (L.) Toelken ― defined by having (2–)3–5 bract pairs on the stem of its inflorescence

Other forms include:

- Cotyledon orbiculata var. dactylopsis ― small and proliferous plant with elongated, terete leaves
- Cotyledon orbiculata var. engleri (= cultivar: "Viridis") ― leaves a deep and slightly glaucous green
- Cotyledon orbiculata var. mucronata ― defined by its mucronate leaves
- Cotyledon orbiculata var. oophylla Dinter (= cultivars: "Boegoeberg" and "Lizard Eggs") ― defined by its round, white, pruinose leaves
- Cotyledon orbiculata var. undulata Haw. (= cultivar: "Silver Crown") ― defined by its wide, flat, round leaves with bent margin
- Cotyledon orbiculata f. takbok ― leaves often with multiple lobes, becoming antler-like
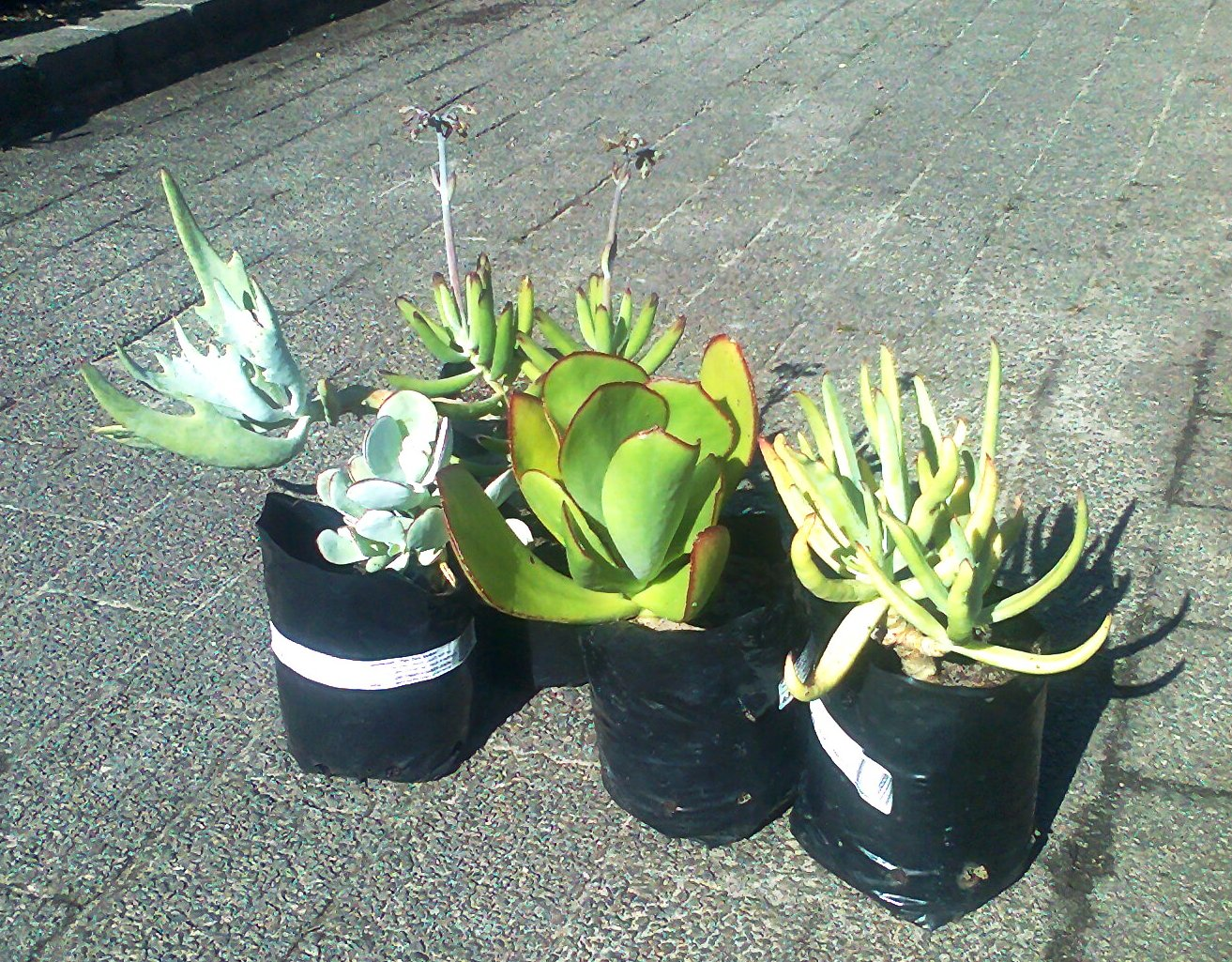
Cotyledon orbiculata is a common garden plant, with many different varieties. The antler-like leaves of the takbok form can be seen on the left for example.

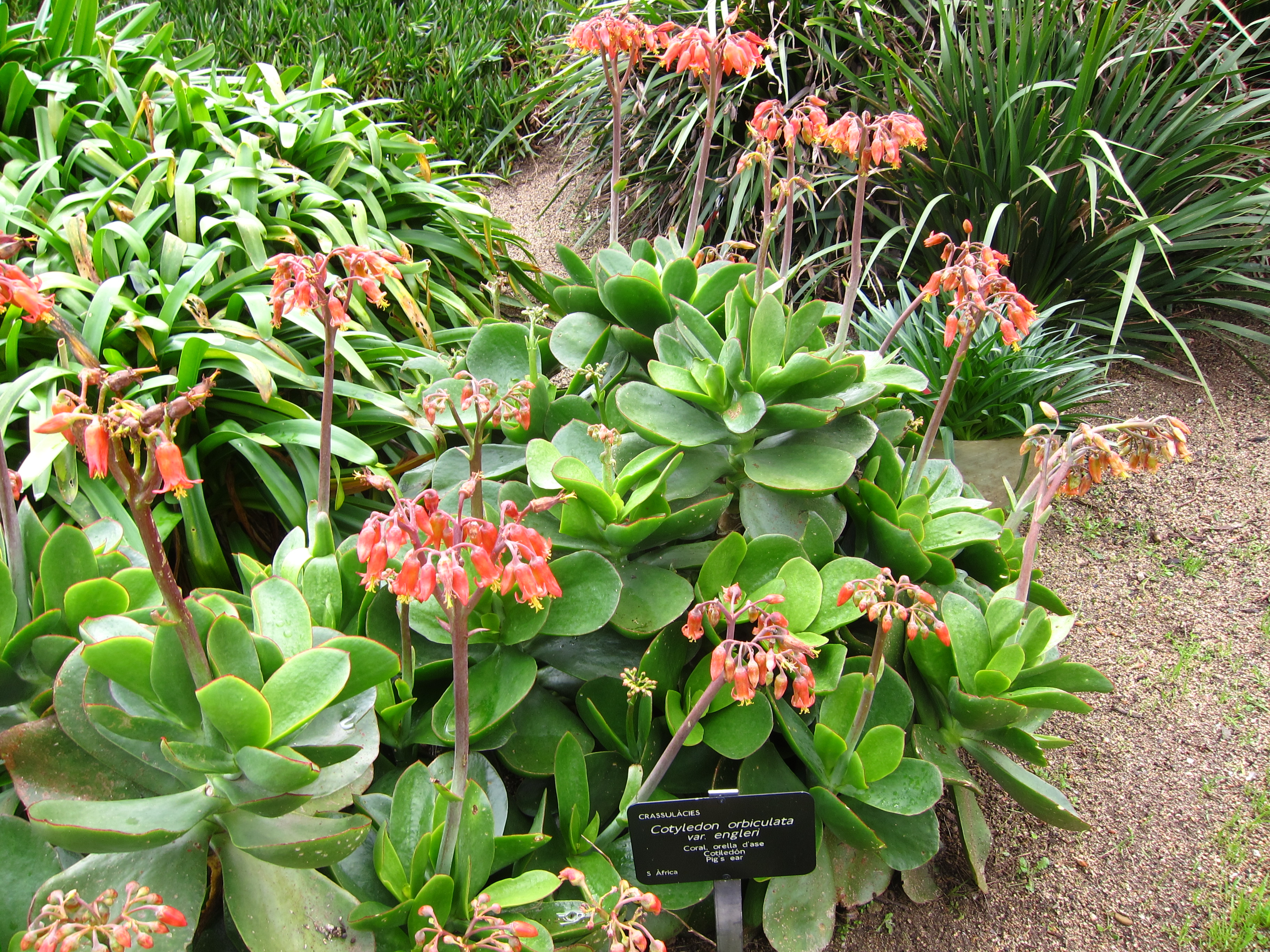
Var. engleri, with its deep glaucous-green leaves

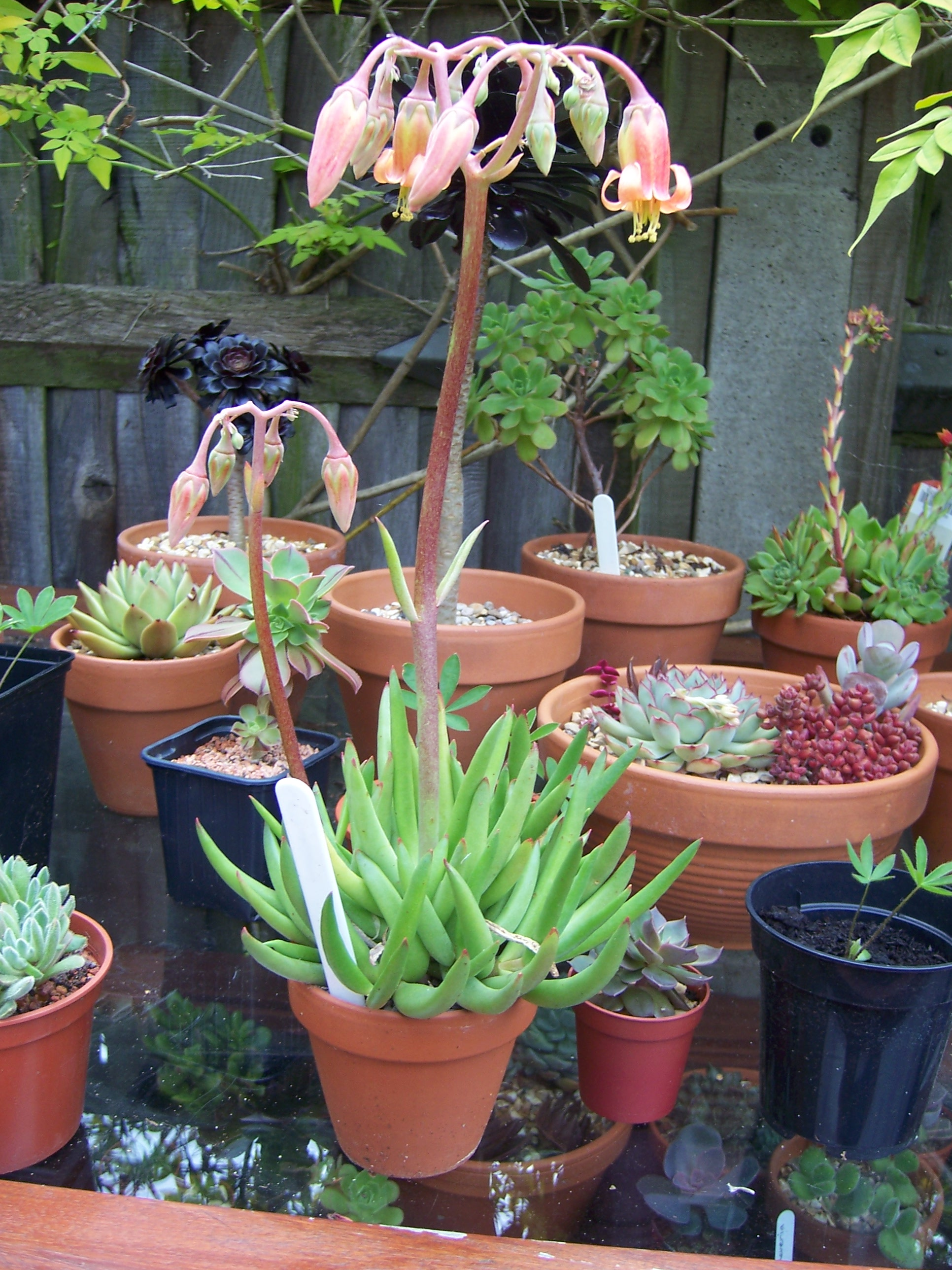
Var. flanaganii often has its elongated leaves in whorls of three.

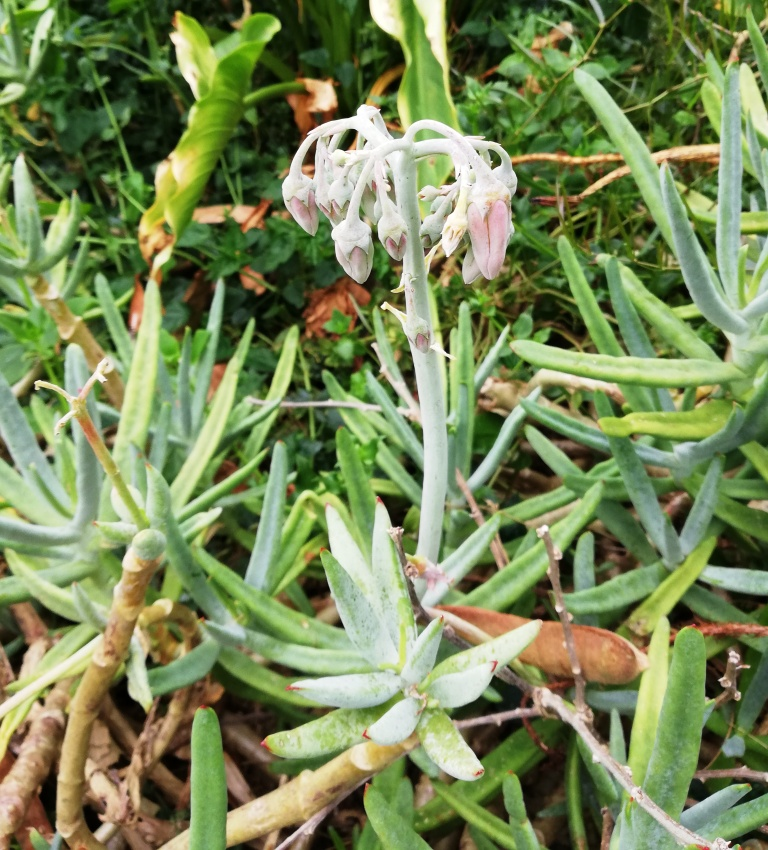
Var. oblonga, a cultivar known as "Grey Sticks"

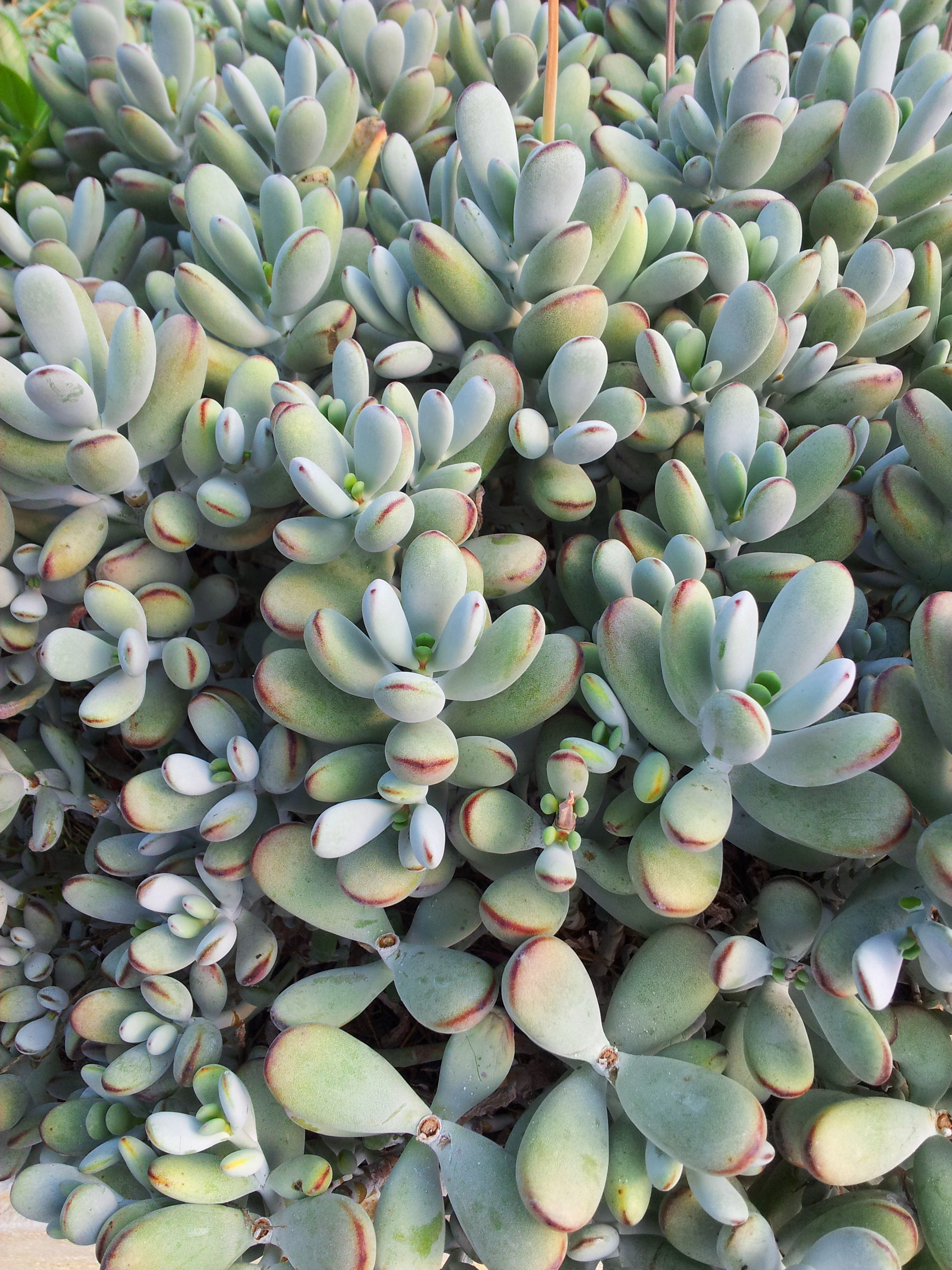
Var. oophylla has round, white, pruinose leaves.

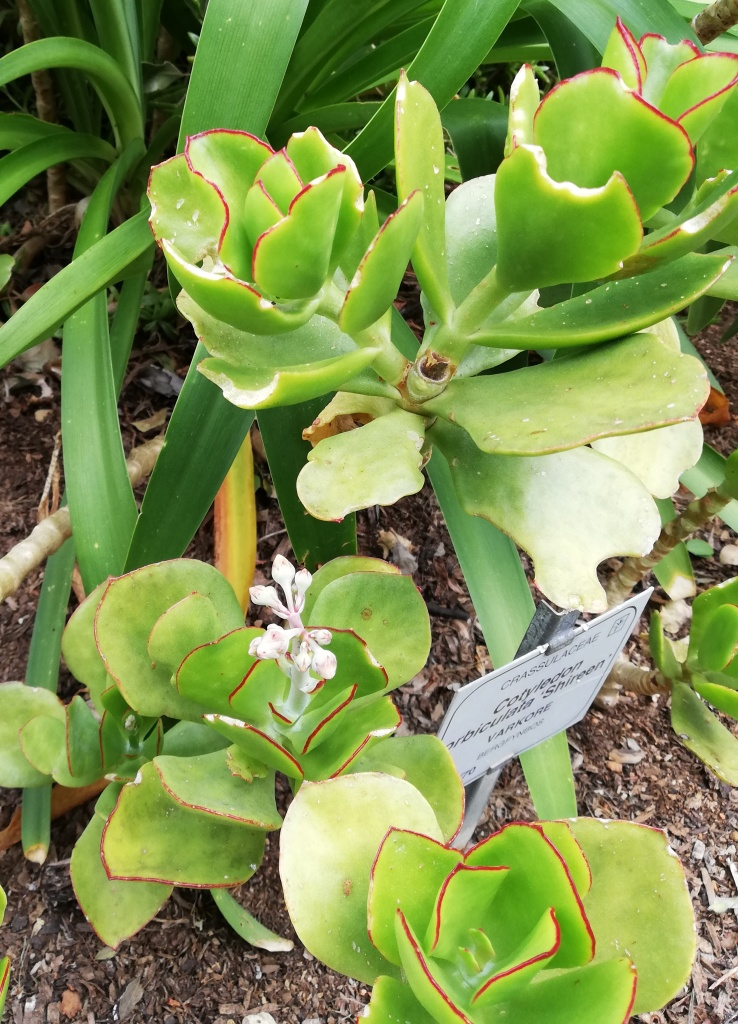
"Shireen" form

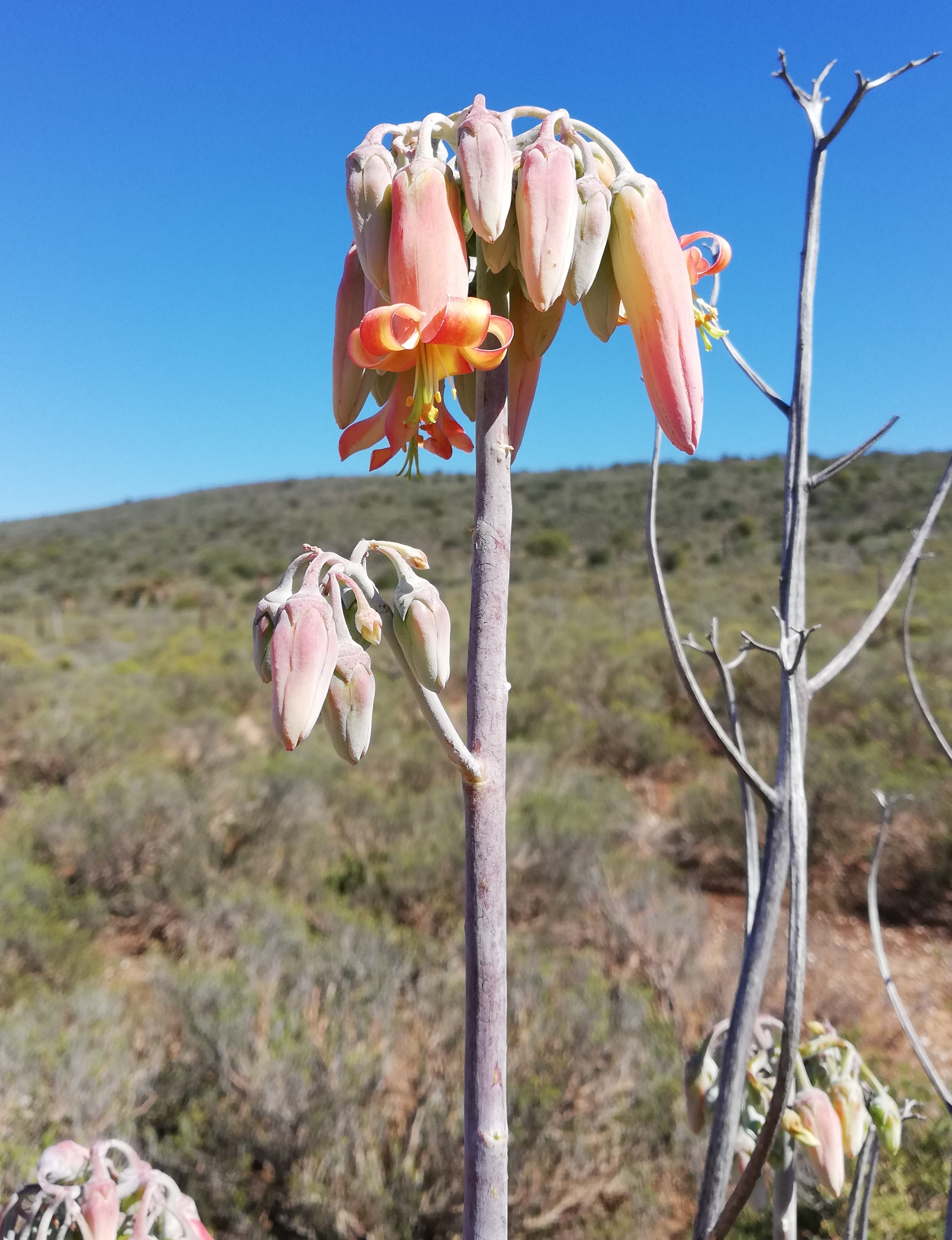
Var. spuria

== Distribution ==
Native to South Africa, it is popular in gardens in many countries. In the wild, it grows naturally in rocky outcrops in grassy shrubland and the Karoo region. In New Zealand, it is considered an invasive plant and is listed on the National Pest Plant Accord.

== Uses ==
Cotyledon orbiculata has a number of medicinal uses. In South Africa, the fleshy part of the leaf is applied to warts and corns. Heated leaves are used as poultices for boils and other inflammations. Single leaves may be eaten as a vermifuge and the juice has been used to treat epilepsy.

However, the leaves contain a bufanolide called cotyledontoxin, which is toxic to sheep, goats, horses, cattle, poultry, and dogs, causing a condition known as cotyledonosis.
