= Bearpaw Mountain =

Mountain in Washington, United States

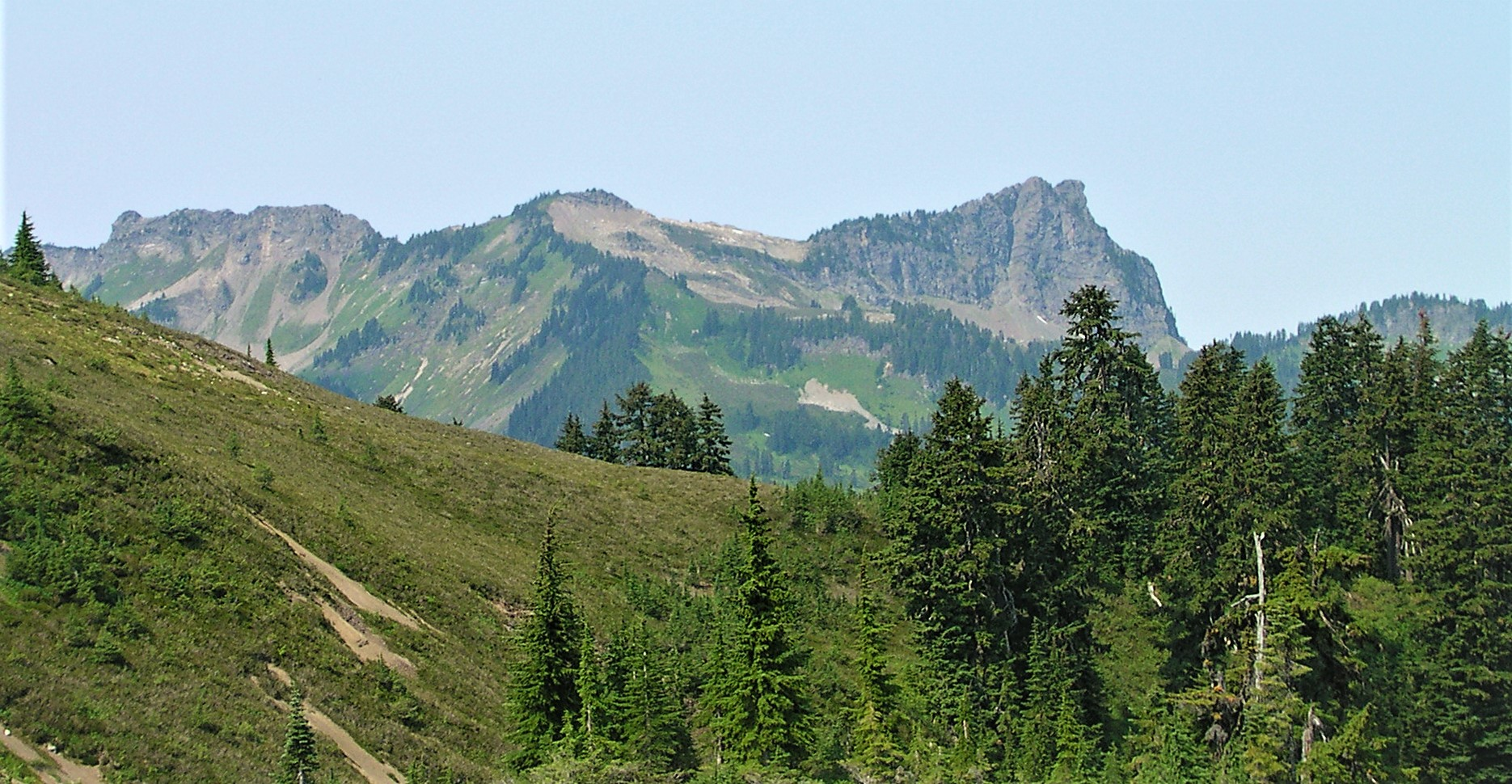
- East aspect, summit right of center

Highest point
- Elevation: 6,091 ft (1,857 m)
- Prominence: 251 ft (77 m)
- Parent peak: Church Mountain
- Isolation: 1.80 mi (2.90 km)
- Coordinates: 48°56′46″N 121°51′14″W

Geography
- Location within Washington (state) Location within the United States
- Interactive map of Bearpaw Mountain
- Location: Whatcom County, Washington, U.S.
- Parent range: North Cascades; Cascade Range
- Topo map: USGS Bearpaw Mountain

Climbing
- Easiest route: class 3 scramble from southwest

Bearpaw Mountain is a 6,091-foot (1,857-metre) mountain summit located in Whatcom County of Washington state. It is situated less than four miles south of the Canada–United States border, on land managed by Mount Baker-Snoqualmie National Forest. The nearest higher neighbor is Church Mountain, 1.8 miles (2.9 km) to the southwest, and Mount Baker rises 11.8 miles (19.0 km) to the south. Precipitation runoff from the mountain drains to the Nooksack River via Canyon Creek. Topographic relief is significant as the north aspect rises 3,100 feet (945 m) above Canyon Creek in approximately 1.5 mile. Bearpaw Mountain houses Bearpaw Mountain Lake, 650 ft elevated fishing lake.

== Climate ==
Bearpaw Mountain is located in the marine west coast climate zone of western North America. Most weather fronts originate in the Pacific Ocean, and travel northeast toward the Cascade Mountains. As fronts approach the North Cascades, they are forced upward by the peaks of the Cascade Range, causing them to drop their moisture in the form of rain or snowfall onto the Cascades (Orographic lift). As a result, the west side of the North Cascades experiences high precipitation, especially during the winter months in the form of snowfall. Because of maritime influence, snow tends to be wet and heavy, resulting in high avalanche danger. Due to its temperate climate and proximity to the Pacific Ocean, areas west of the Cascade Crest very rarely experience temperatures below 0 °F (−18 °C) or above 80 °F (27 °C). During winter months, weather is usually cloudy, but due to high pressure systems over the Pacific Ocean that intensify during summer months, there is often little or no cloud cover during the summer.

== Geology ==
The North Cascades features some of the most rugged topography in the Cascade Range with craggy peaks, ridges, and deep glacial valleys. Geological events occurring many years ago created the diverse topography and drastic elevation changes over the Cascade Range leading to various climate differences.

The history of the formation of the Cascade Mountains dates back millions of years ago to the late Eocene Epoch. With the North American Plate overriding the Pacific Plate, episodes of volcanic igneous activity persisted. In addition, small fragments of the oceanic and continental lithosphere called terranes created the North Cascades about 50 million years ago.

During the Pleistocene period dating back over two million years ago, glaciation advancing and retreating repeatedly scoured and shaped the landscape. The U-shaped cross section of the river valleys is a result of recent glaciation. Uplift and faulting in combination with glaciation have been the dominant processes which have created the tall peaks and deep valleys of the North Cascades area.

== See also ==
- Geography of the North Cascades
- Geology of the Pacific Northwest
