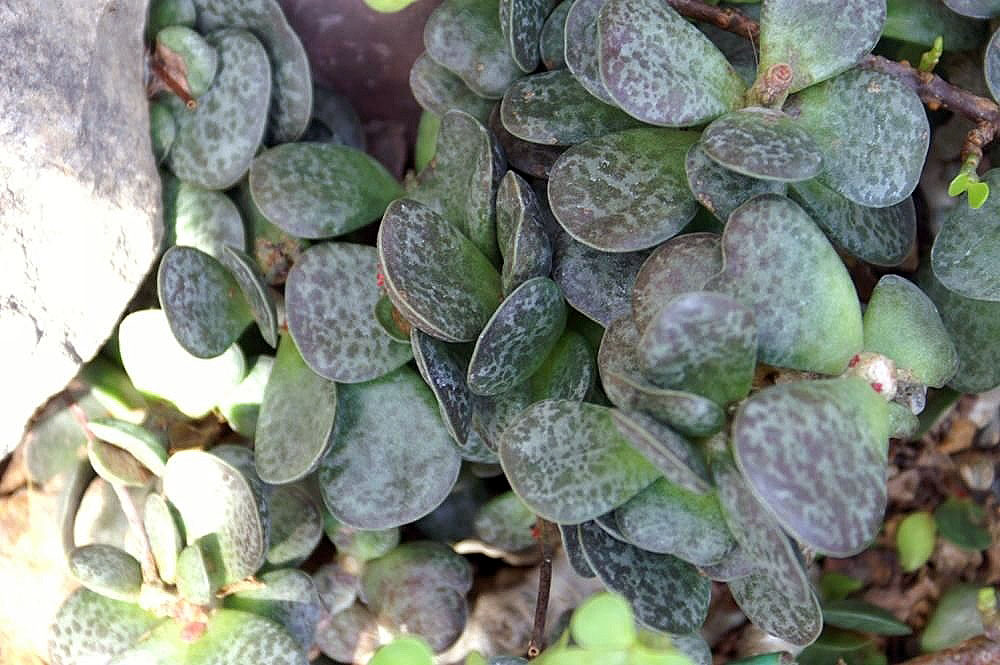
- Plants
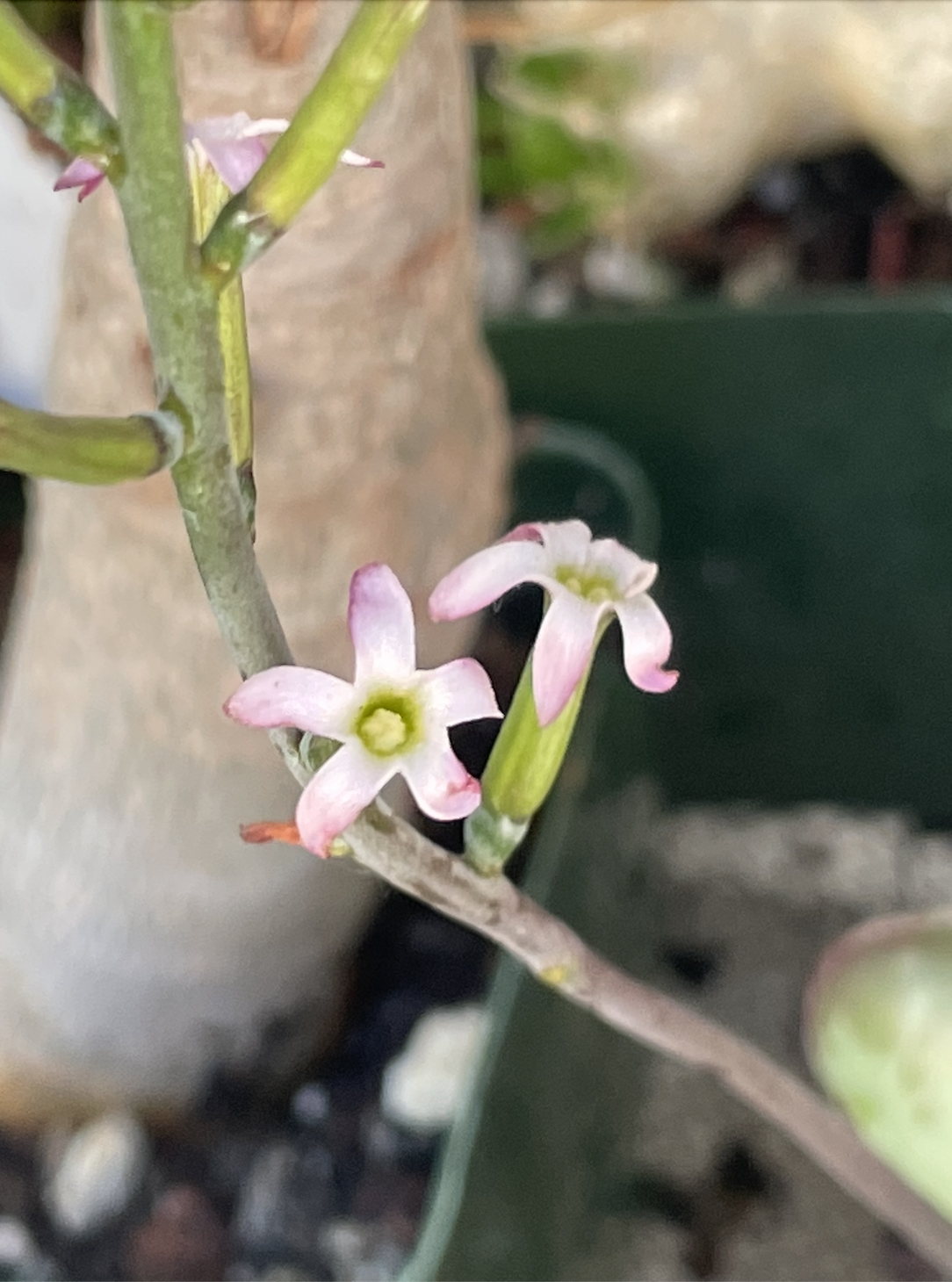
- Flowers

Scientific classification
- Kingdom: Plantae
- Clade: Embryophytes
- Clade: Tracheophytes
- Clade: Spermatophytes
- Clade: Angiosperms
- Clade: Eudicots
- Order: Saxifragales
- Family: Crassulaceae
- Genus: Adromischus
- Species: A. maculatus

Binomial name
- Adromischus maculatus (Salm-Dyck) Lem.

Synonyms
- Adromischus mucronatus Lem.; Cotyledon alternans Haw.; Cotyledon maculata Salm-Dyck

= Adromischus maculatus =

Species of succulent

Adromischus maculatus, the spotted adromischus or calico hearts, is a species of flowering plant in the family Crassulaceae, which is endemic to the Eastern Cape and Western Cape of South Africa.

== Description ==
Growing to 35 cm (14 in), it is a mat-forming succulent perennial, with thick spade-shaped leaves growing from a short, prostrate, woody stem. Plants are variable in colouring. Some are plain green, while others have leaves which are covered in maroon or brown blotches - hence the Latin specific epithet maculatus, meaning "spotted". In summer (December-January), tubular green inflorescences are borne on 25–30 cm (9.8–11.8 in) long branches, with pink or white lobes.

== Distribution and habitat ==
Adromischus maculatus grows on the sunny, sandstone slopes of South Africa's Langeberg Mountains. It is widely cultivated, but does not tolerate prolonged frost, so in temperate regions is usually grown indoors as a houseplant. It has gained the Royal Horticultural Society's Award of Garden Merit.
