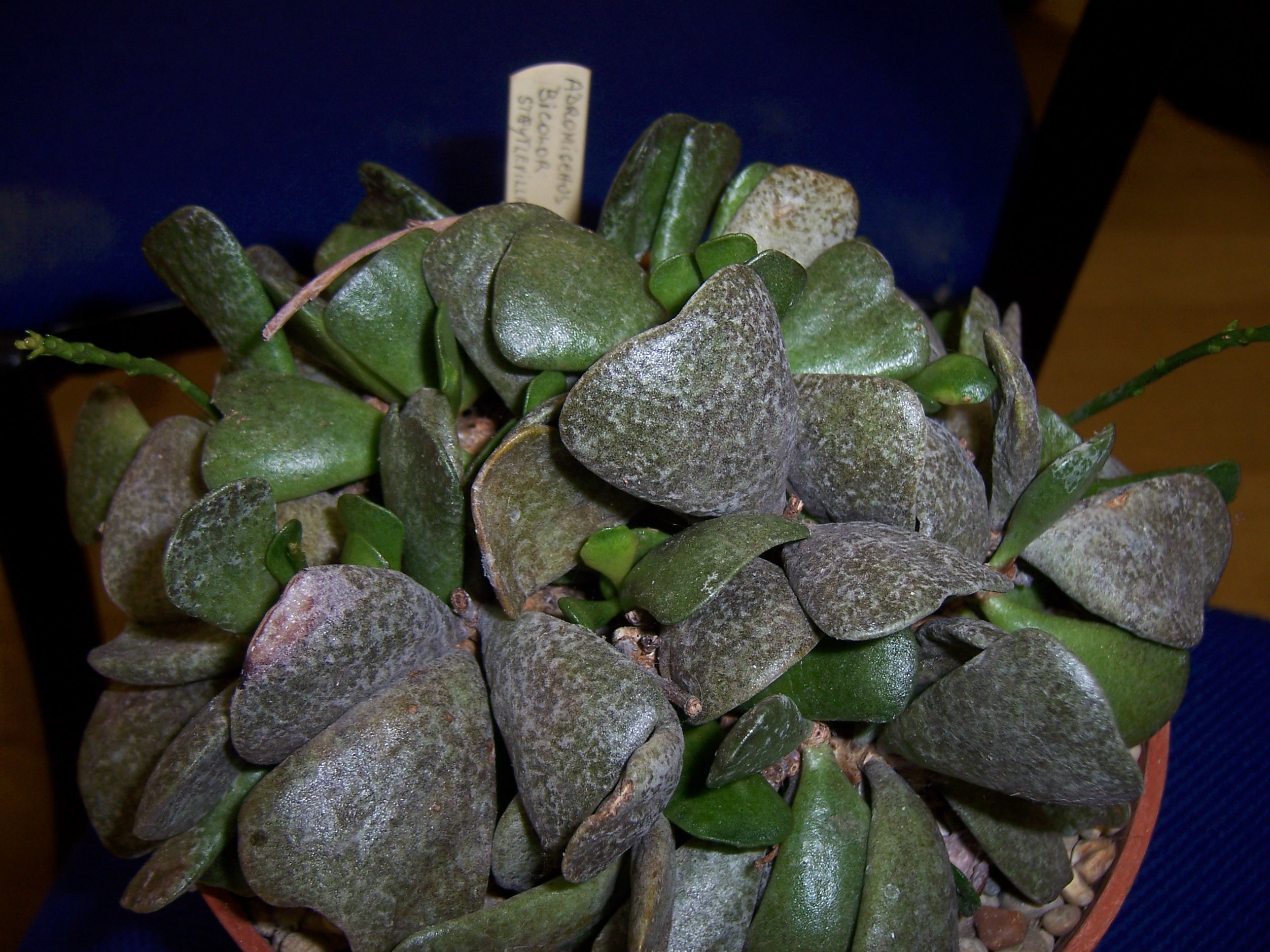

Scientific classification
- Kingdom: Plantae
- Clade: Tracheophytes
- Clade: Angiosperms
- Clade: Eudicots
- Order: Saxifragales
- Family: Crassulaceae
- Genus: Adromischus
- Species: A. bicolor

Binomial name
- Adromischus bicolor Hutchison (1957)
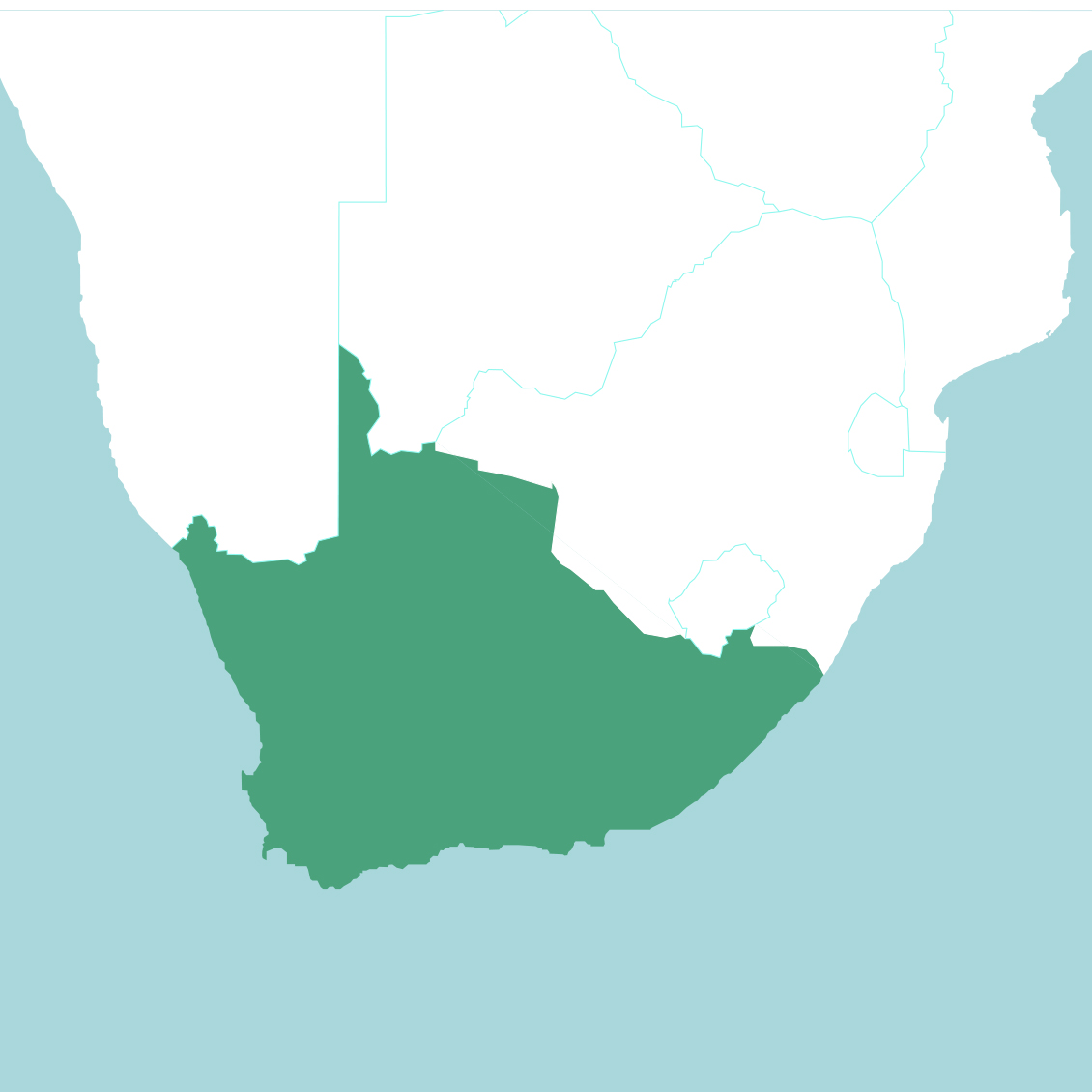
- Distribution of Adromischus bicolor

= Adromischus bicolor =

Species of succulent plant

Adromischus bicolor is a perennial, succulent plant in the family Crassulaceae. The species name bicolor refers to the light, grey-green leaves spotted with purple to purple-green spots. It is endemic to the Succulent Karoo of western South Africa, as well as the Eastern Cape, South Africa.

== Description ==
Adromischus bicolor is a small, clumping plant with a compact habit reaching 4 cm tall and 9 cm wide. Its many small, grey-brown, succulent branches reach a diameter of 3 mm. The grey-green leaves with purple spots are obovate, sometimes obtriangular. One to two inflorescences begin to appear in the middle of summer, reaching up to 25 cm tall. The tubular flowers begin yellow-green at the base and gradated to a tinge of red. The 2 mm long petals are white and triangular.

== Distribution and habitat ==
Adromischus bicolor occurs in exposed rock crevices in eastern and western regions of South Africa. There are less than five known populations. Some variation in leaf shape occurs depending on the locality, and it is unclear if both groups are of the same species. It is the only species of the Adromischus section to grow endemically in the eastern Cape. It is one of thousands of species of succulent plants to occur in the Succulent Karoo.

== Cultivation ==
Adromischus bicolor is a slow-growing plant. Indoors, it will take as much sun as it can get in order to make the purple pigments pop. If growing outdoors, some shade may be required during the hottest months. Water only when soil dries completely. It can tolerate short periods of frost if the soil is completely dry, otherwise it can rot. Adromischus require a period of cold temperatures, around 10 °C, in order to flower. Propagation is easily done by leaf.
