= Adromischus subviridis =

Conservation status
- Least Concern (SANBI Red List)

Scientific classification
- Kingdom: Plantae
- Clade: Tracheophytes
- Clade: Angiosperms
- Clade: Eudicots
- Order: Saxifragales
- Family: Crassulaceae
- Genus: Adromischus
- Species: A. subviridis

Binomial name
- Adromischus subviridis Toelken.

Species of succulent plant

Adromischus subviridis is a succulent plant species in the genus Adromischus. It is endemic to the Succulent Karoo of Northern Cape of South Africa.

== Distribution ==
Adromischus subviridis is found from Loeriesfontein to Nieuwoudtville and Calvinia.

== Conservation status ==
Adromischus subviridis is classified as Least Concern with an EOO of 3945 km^{2}. Known from a few collections; though this could be due to it being overlooked rather than it being rare.
