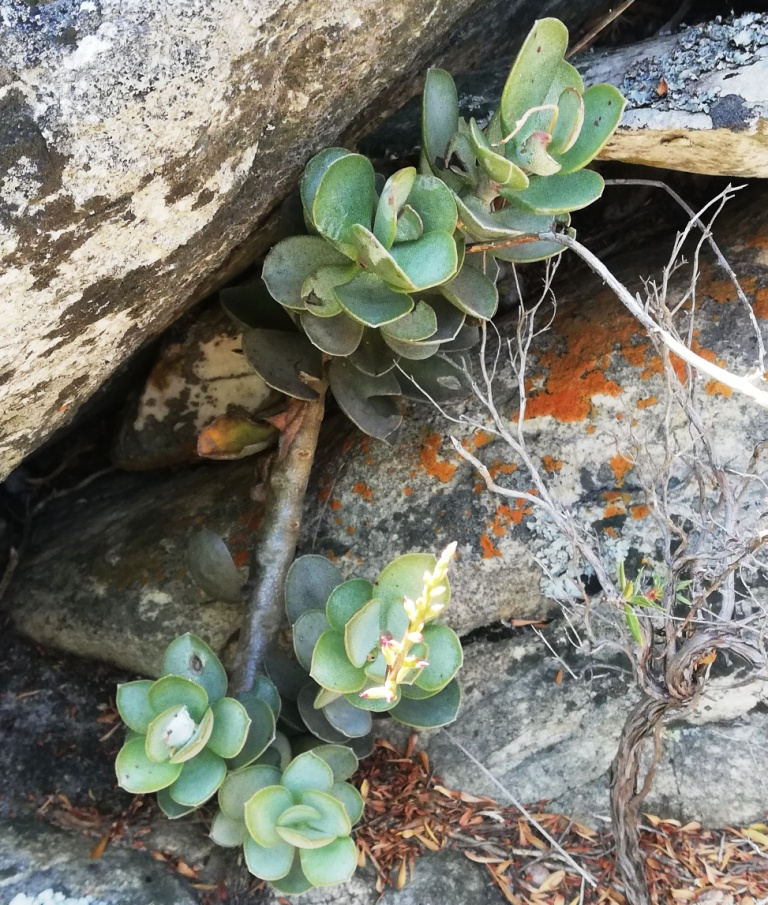
- Adromischus hemisphaericus in situ
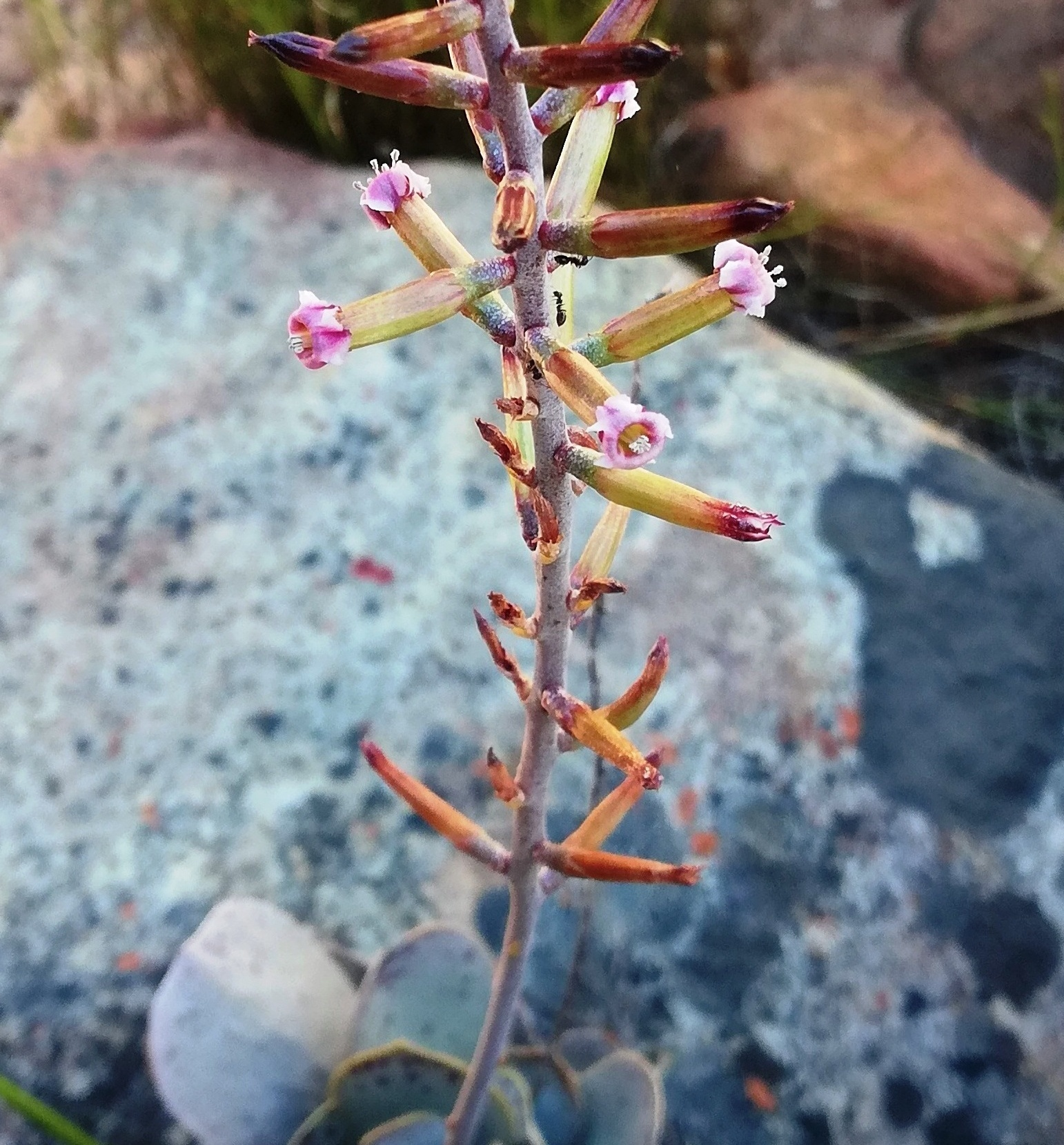
- Adromischus hemisphaericus flowers

Scientific classification
- Kingdom: Plantae
- Clade: Tracheophytes
- Clade: Angiosperms
- Clade: Eudicots
- Order: Saxifragales
- Family: Crassulaceae
- Genus: Adromischus
- Species: A. hemisphaericus

Binomial name
- Adromischus hemisphaericus (L.) Lemaire, 1852
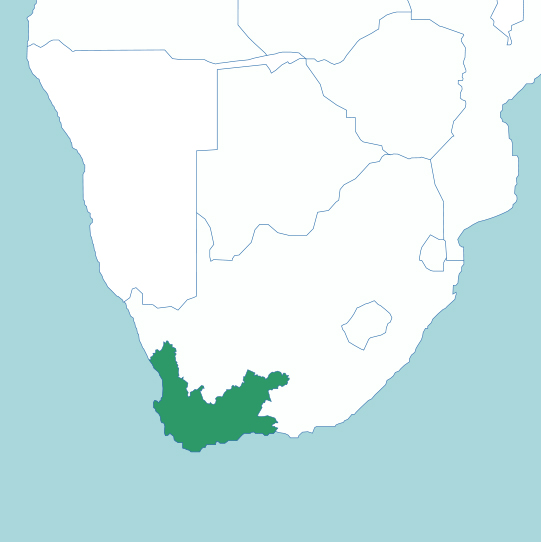
- Adromischus hemisphaericus distribution

Synonyms
- Cotyledon hemisphaerica L. in Sp. Pl.: 429 (1753); Sedum hemisphaericum (L.) Kuntze in Revis. Gen. Pl. 3(2): 85 (1898); Adromischus rhombifolius (Haw.) Lem. in Jard. FIeur. 2(Misc.): 60 (1852); Adromischus rotundifolius (Haw.) C.A.Sm. in Bothalia 3: 627 (1939); Cotyledon crassifolia (Salisb.) in Prodr. Stirp. Chap. Allerton: 307 (1796); Cotyledon rhombifolia (Haw.) in Philos. Mag. J. 67: 33 (1825); Cotyledon rhombifolia (Eckl.) & Zeyh. in Enum. Pl. Afric. Austral.: 307 (1837); Cotyledon rotundifolia (Haw.) in Philos. Mag. Ann. Chem. 1827: 273 (1827); Cotyledon rotundifolia (Eckl.) & Zeyh. in Enum. Pl. Afric. Austral.: 307 (1837); Echeveria rhombifolia (Haw.) Ed.Otto in Hamburger Garten- Blumenzeitung 39: 9 (1873)

= Adromischus hemisphaericus =

Species of succulent plant

Adromischus hemisphaericus is a perennial, succulent plant in the Crassulaceae family. It is commonly called Brosplakkies (brittle patches). The species is endemic to the Western Cape, South Africa.

== Description ==
Adromischus hemisphaericus is a small, decumbent, branching plant which tends to vary in its habit. The grey branches mature with peeling bark and reach 8 mm in diameter. Young branches are purplish-green and mature to grey. The leaves, grey with purple spots, can flake with wax. They are mostly flat and ovate, with slightly convex upper and lower faces, and can reach 3.5 cm long and 2.4 cm wide. Mid-summer brings inflorescences reaching 25 cm tall with many tubular flowers. The greenish-brown sepals are topped with triangular, light pink petals.

== Etymology ==
The genus name, Adromischus, comes from Greek, Adro- meaning 'thick' and -mischus meaning 'stem'. The species name, hemisphaericus, means 'hemispherical' in Latin, an epithet for its leaf shape.

== Distribution ==
Adromischus hemisphaericus is endemic to the Western Cape, South Africa. Populations occur on the Cape Peninsula, and sparsely east of the Hottentots Holland Mountains, and from Caledon to Worcester.
