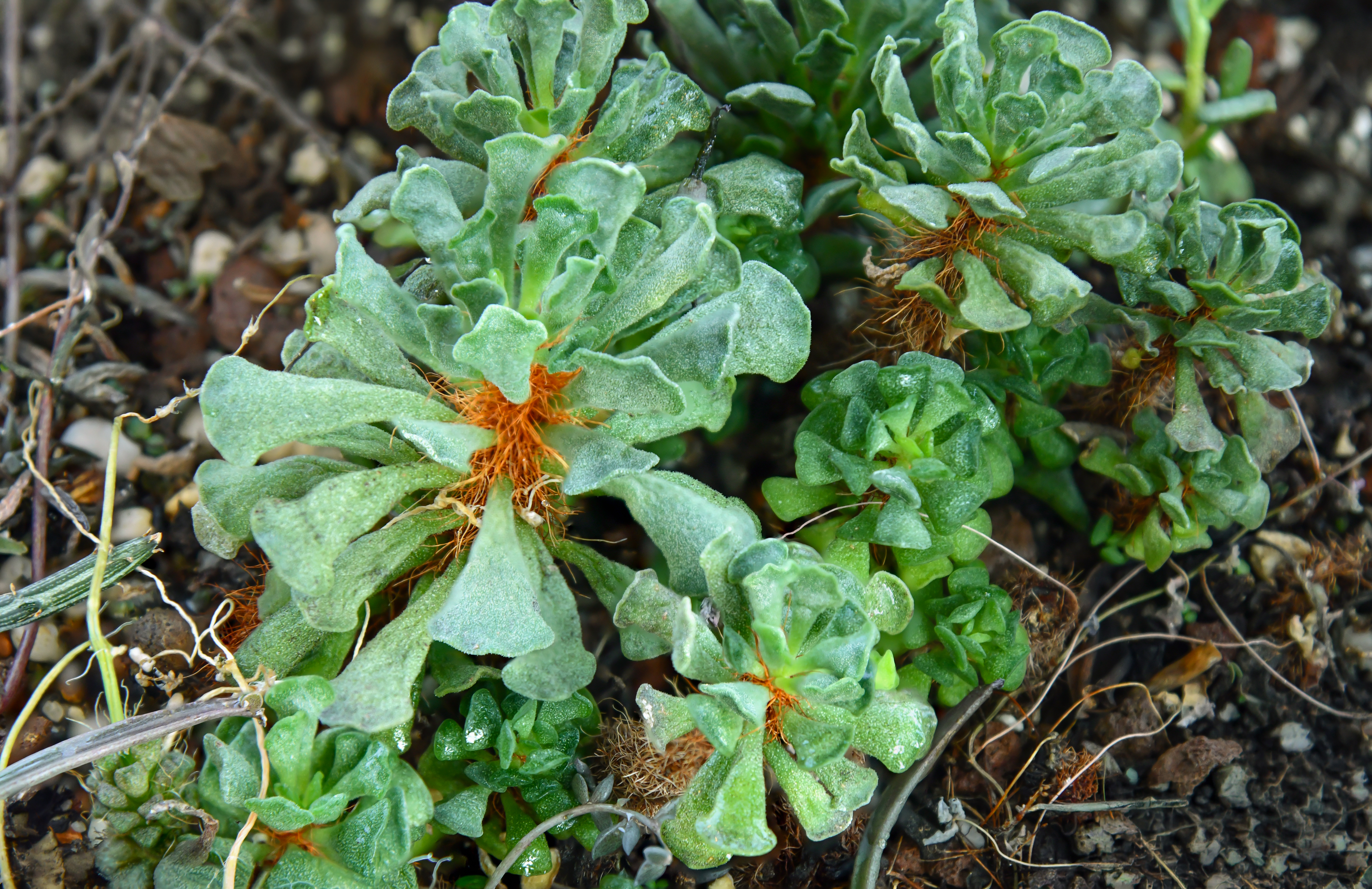

Scientific classification
- Kingdom: Plantae
- Clade: Tracheophytes
- Clade: Angiosperms
- Clade: Eudicots
- Order: Saxifragales
- Family: Crassulaceae
- Genus: Adromischus
- Species: A. cristatus

Binomial name
- Adromischus cristatus (Haw.) Lem., (1852)

Synonyms
- Cotyledon cristata Haw.; Adromischus poellnitzianus Werderm.

= Adromischus cristatus =

Species of succulent

Adromischus cristatus is a species of succulents from the family Crassulaceae, endemic to the eastern cape of South Africa. It is a perennial with short erect branches 20–50 mm long covered with fine aerial roots. Leaves are green to gray-green, with undulating margin, and generally measuring 20–40 × 5–13 mm. During the springtime, it sends up long narrow stalks for its flowers, which are tubular in shape and white in color with hints of red. Common names for this plant include "Key Lime Pie" and "Crinkle Leaf Plant."

== Horticulture ==
This plant grows best given bright light and good airflow. Plant in cacti/succulent potting soil for ample drainage and provide water when the soil is dry. Water less frequently during the winter. While hardy down to freezing temperatures (32 °F or 0 °C), avoid exposure to frost.

Adromischus cristatus is hardy to USDA hardiness zone 10.
