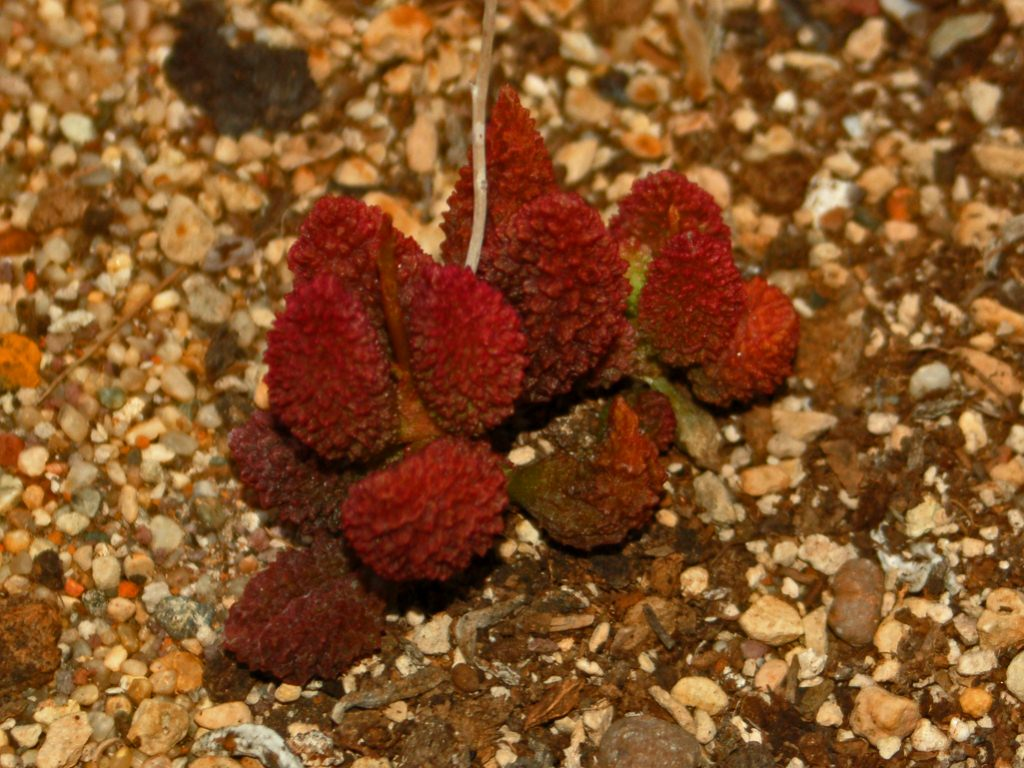
- Adromischus marianae subsp. herrei at the botanical garden of Villa Durazzo-Pallavicini, Genova Pegli

Scientific classification
- Kingdom: Plantae
- Clade: Tracheophytes
- Clade: Angiosperms
- Clade: Eudicots
- Order: Saxifragales
- Family: Crassulaceae
- Genus: Adromischus
- Species: A. marianae

Binomial name
- Adromischus marianae A.Berger

Synonyms
- Cotyledon herrei W. F. Barker 1931; Adromischus marianae var. antidorcadum von Poellnitz; Adromischus marianae f. multicolor Pilbeam; Adromischus var. immaculatum Uitewaal 1953

= Adromischus marianiae =

Species of succulent

Adromischus marianiae is a species of succulent plant in the genus Adromischus belonging to the family Crassulaceae.

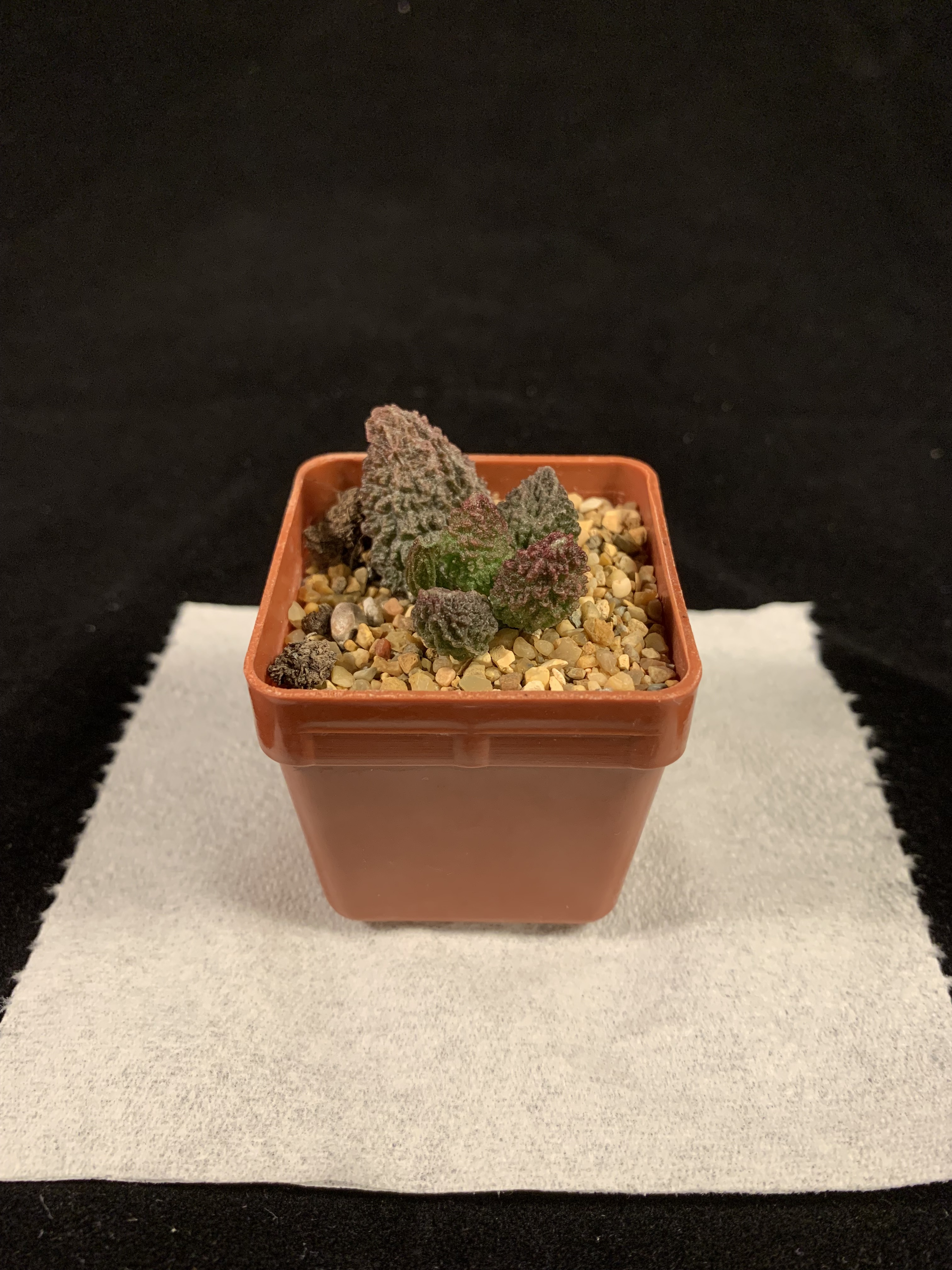
An Adromischus marianae being grown as a houseplant

== Description ==
Adromischus marianiae ranges in height from 10–15 centimetres (3.9–5.9 in). This perennial succulent and slow-growing subshrub has usually thin and short branches and forms a small cluster of rough, warty and nearly spherical leaves resembling dried raisins, quite variable in colour but usually green or red-brown or purplish, up to 3.5 cm long. Flowers are green with a pinkish nuance, about 12 mm long.

== Cultivation ==
A. marianiae requires bright light and should not be overwatered. It typically struggles at temperatures below 5 °C.

== Distribution ==
This plant is native to South Africa and Namibia.

== Habitat ==
Adromischus marianiae grows on granite hills, sometimes inside the cracks of the rocks and in the shade of bushes.

== Varieties ==
- Adromischus marianiae var. immaculatus
- Adromischus marianiae var. herrei

== Cultivars ==
- Adromischus marianiae 'Alveolatus'
- Adromischus marianiae 'Antidorcatum'
- Adromischus marianiae 'Bryan Makin'
- Adromischus marianiae 'Herrei'
- Adromischus marianiae 'Little Spheroid'
- Adromischus marianiae 'Red Mutation'
- Adromischus marianiae 'Tanqua'
