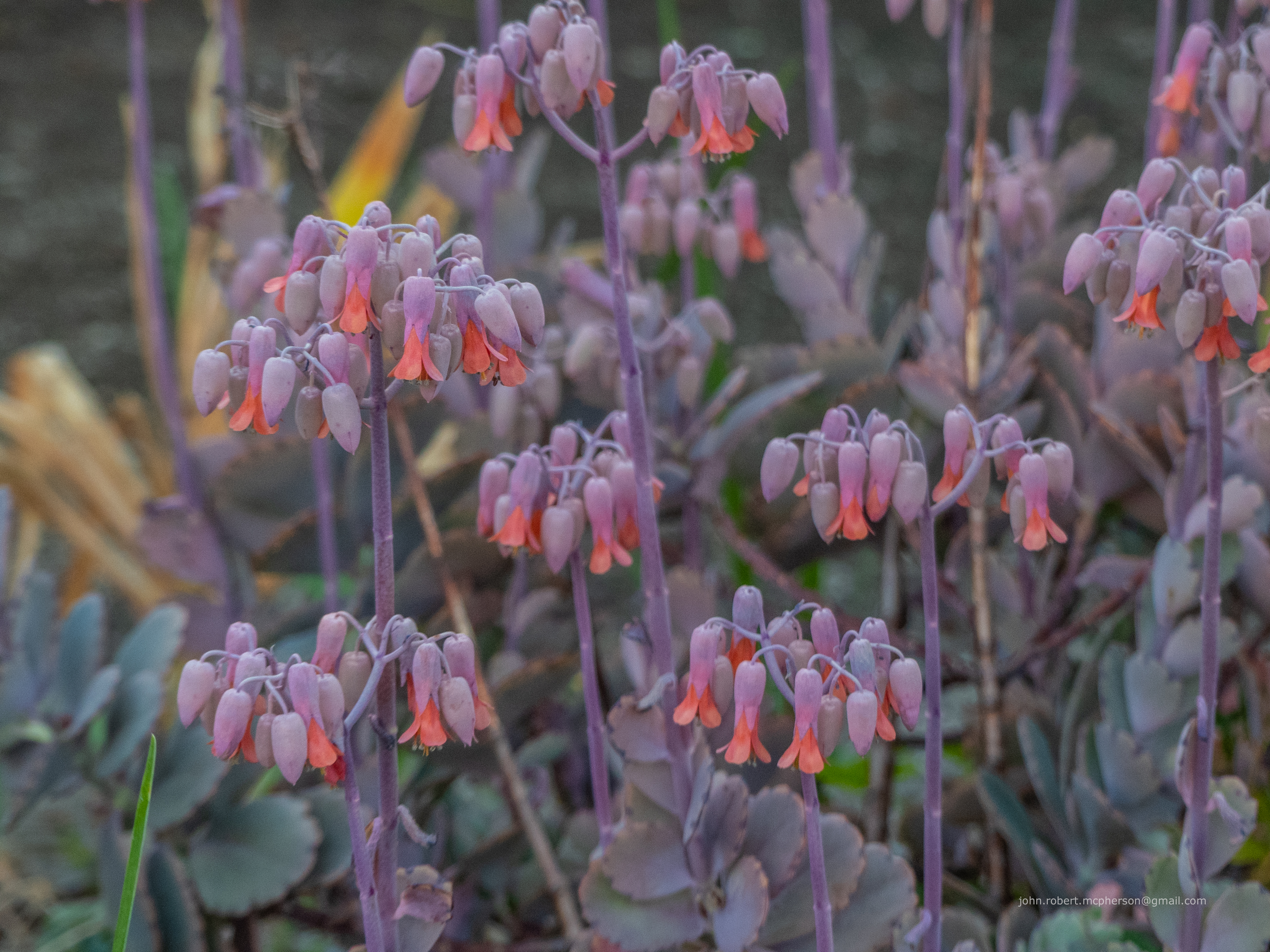
- Kalanchoe fedtschenkoi

Scientific classification
- Kingdom: Plantae
- Clade: Tracheophytes
- Clade: Angiosperms
- Clade: Eudicots
- Order: Saxifragales
- Family: Crassulaceae
- Subfamily: Kalanchoideae; A. Berger (1930)

Genera
- See text

= Kalanchoideae =

Subfamily of plants

Kalanchoideae is one of three subfamilies in the Saxifragales family Crassulaceae, with four succulent genera.

== Genera ==
The following five genera are recognised:

- Adromischus
- Cotyledon
- Kalanchoe
- Tylecodon

== Taxonomy ==
Cladogram III: Crassulaceae and Sempervivoideae clades and divisions

- Family Crassulaceae 100
  - 82
    Subfamily Crassuloideae
  - - 71
      Subfamily Kalanchoideae
    - Subfamily Sempervivoideae
      - Telephium clade 66
        - Tribe Telephiae
        - Umbiliceae Tribe
          - Clade
            Umbilicus
          - Clade
            Phedimus/Rhodiola
      - - Clade
          Sempervivum/Jovibarba (Tribe Semperviveae)
        - Clade
          Aeonium (Tribe Aeoniae)
        - Sedeae Tribe
          - Clade
            Acre
          - Clade
            Leucosedum

Notes:
I: Petrosedum clade is unplaced, due to discordance in analyses. In plastid phylogeny, it is one of the successive sister clades to the remainder of Sempervivoideae, without Telephium. But in Internal transcribed spacer (ITS) phylogeny Petrosedum it is sister to Aeonium, with Sempervivum/Jovibarba closest to Sedeae. Previously it had been placed within Sempervivum/Jovibarba.
II: Divergence times are in million years ago
