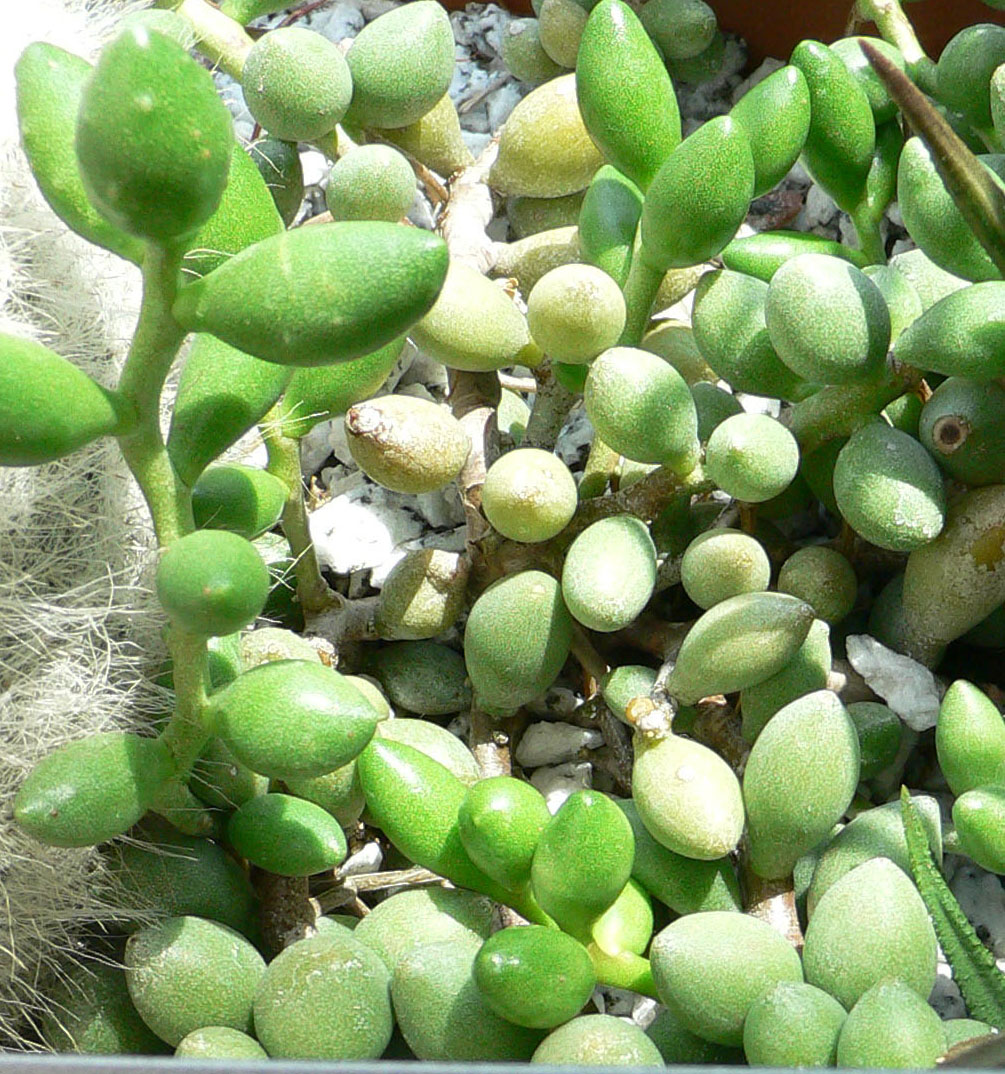
- Adromischus filicaulis subsp. marlothii

Scientific classification
- Kingdom: Plantae
- Clade: Tracheophytes
- Clade: Angiosperms
- Clade: Eudicots
- Order: Saxifragales
- Family: Crassulaceae
- Subfamily: Kalanchoideae
- Genus: Adromischus; Lem. (1852)

= Adromischus =

Genus of succulents

Adromischus is a genus of flowering plants. They are easily-propagated, leaf succulents from the family Crassulaceae, which are endemic to southern Africa. The name comes from the ancient Greek adros (=thick) and mischos (=stem).

== Species ==
The species of Adromischus are divided into five sections, based on their shared characteristics and relationships:

=== Section 1 (Adromischus) ===
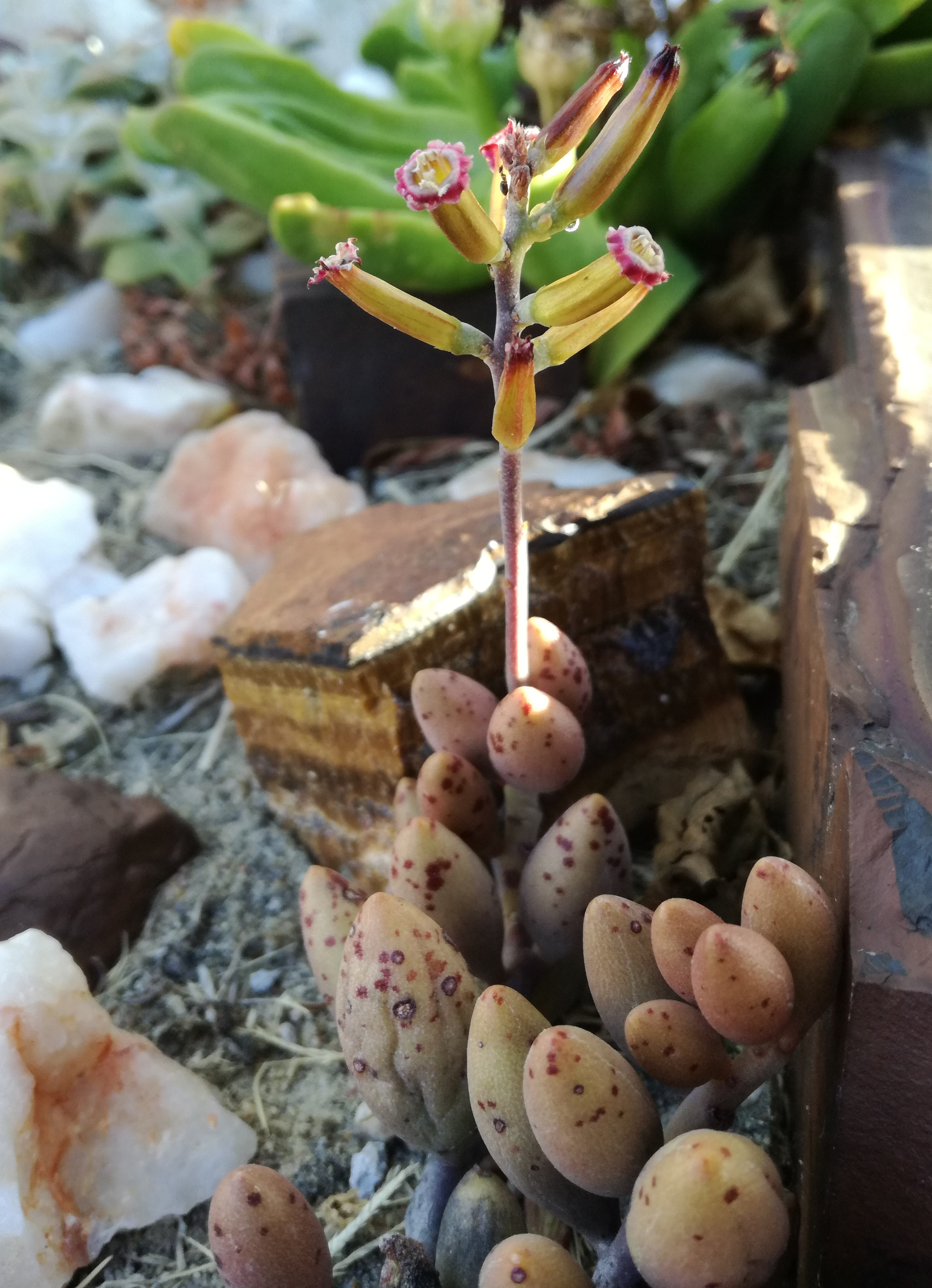
Flowers of a Section 1. species (Adromischus filicaulis)

Flowers bright green, tubular, with short, wide, triangular, recurved lobes. Anthers protrude from a flower tube. Indigenous mainly to the western, winter-rainfall regions of South Africa.

- Adromischus alstonii
- Adromischus bicolor
- Adromischus filicaulis
  - Adromischus filicaulis subsp. marlothii
- Adromischus hemisphaericus
- Adromischus liebenbergii
  - Adromischus liebenbergii subsp. orientalis
- Adromischus montium-klinghardtii
- Adromischus roanianus
- Adromischus subdistichus

=== Section 2 (Boreali) ===
Grooved, tubular flowers, with ovate-triangular, recurved lobes that are undulated on the margins. Anthers protrude from flower tube. Indigenous to the arid, summer-rainfall interior of Southern Africa.

- Adromischus schuldtianus
  - Adromischus schuldtianus subs. juttae
  - Adromischus schuldtianus subs. brandbergensis
- Adromischus trigynus
- Adromischus umbraticola
  - Adromischus umbraticola subs. ramosus

=== Section 3 (Brevipedunculati) ===
Grooved, funnel-shaped flowers with acuminate-triangular, widely spreading lobes, born on long stalks. Inflorescence branched. Usually spreading or stoloniferous plants.

- Adromischus caryophyllaceus
- Adromischus diabolicus
- Adromischus fallax
- Adromischus humilis
- Adromischus nanus
- Adromischus phillipsiae

=== Section 4 (Incisilobati) ===
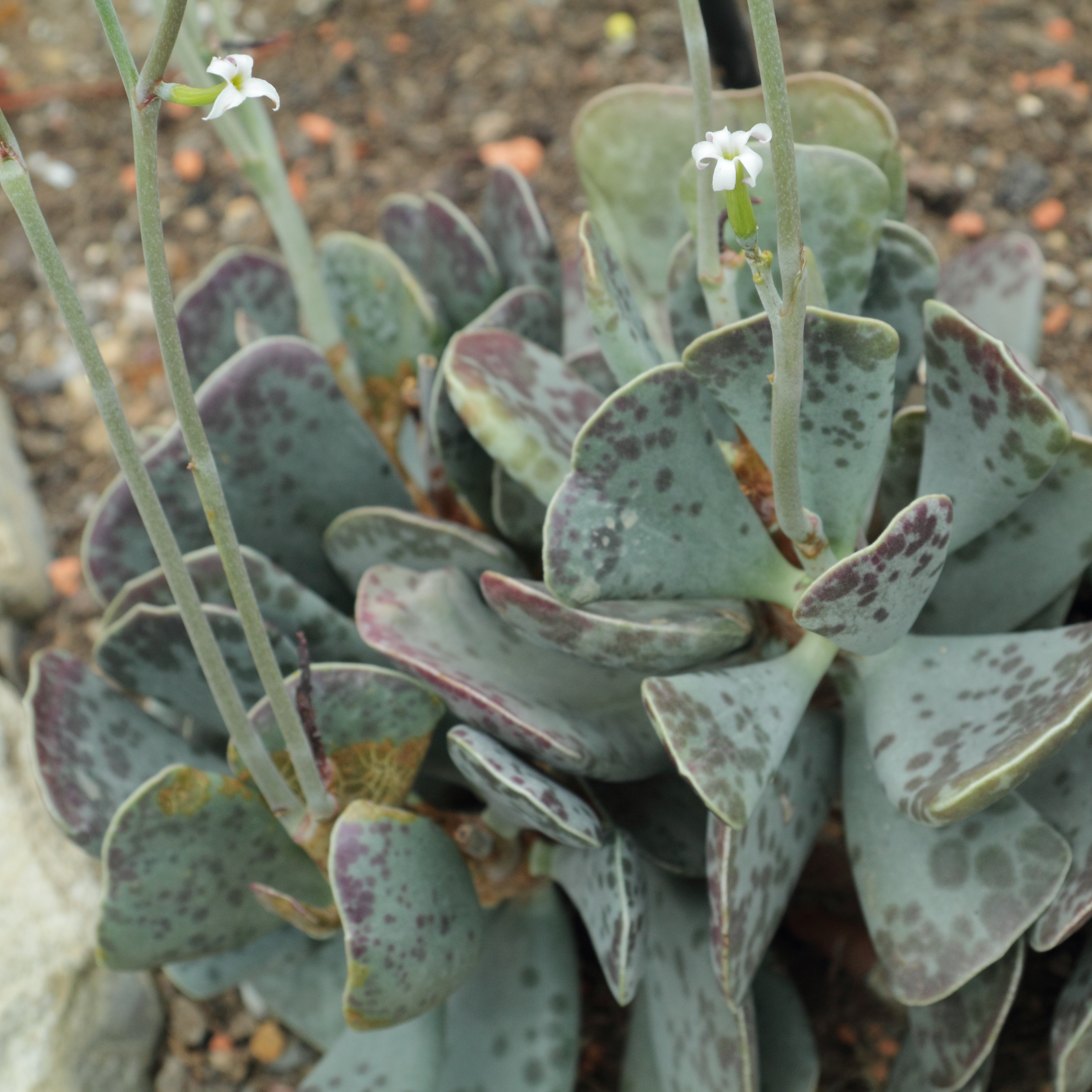
Flowers of a Section 4. species (Adromischus triflorus)

Tubular flowers with elongated lanceolate-triangular lobes. Plants with short, compact, upright stems.

- Adromischus halesowensis
- Adromischus inamoenus
- Adromischus maculatus
- Adromischus mammilaris
- Adromischus maximus
- Adromischus sphenophyllus
- Adromischus triflorus

=== Section 5 (Longipedunculati) ===
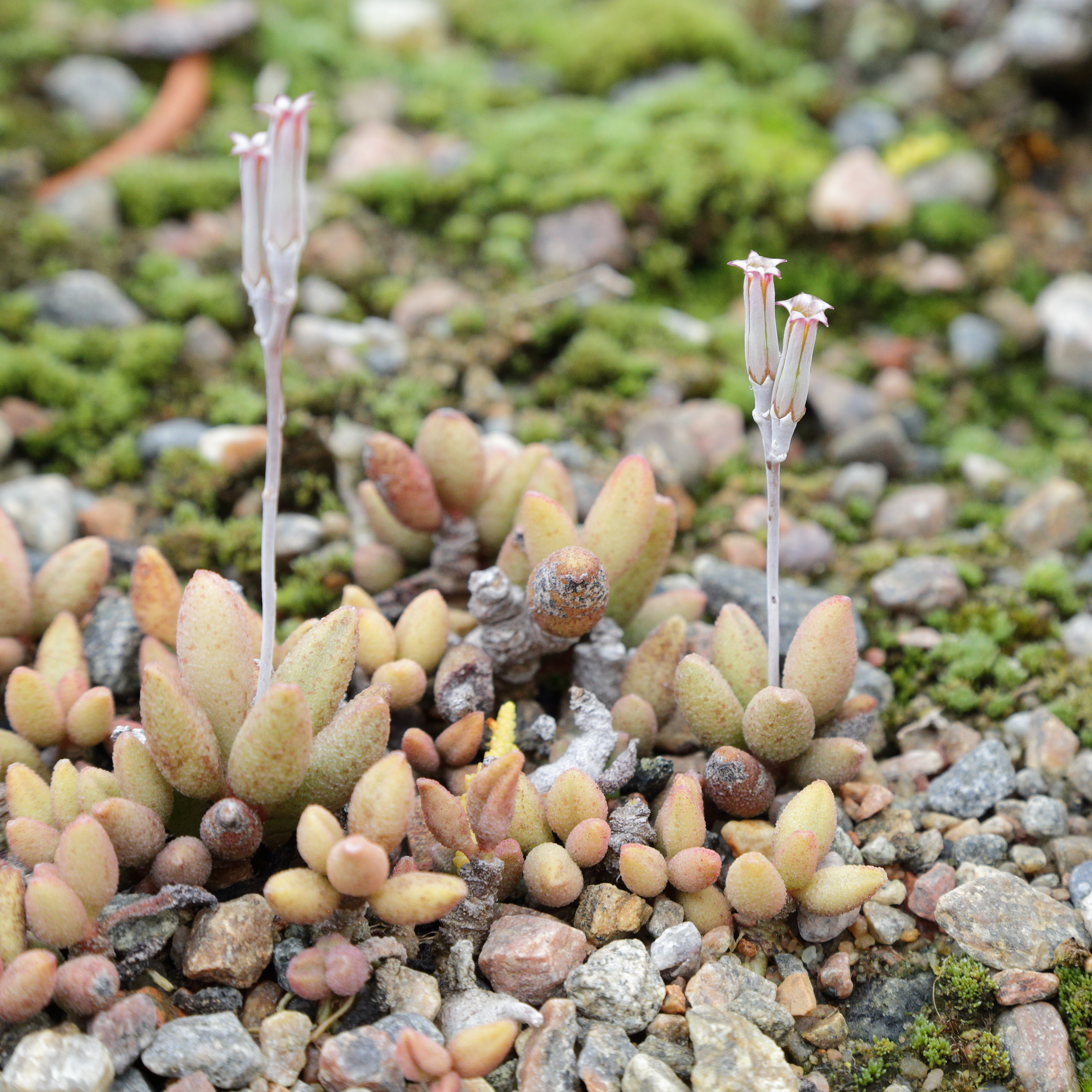
Flowers of a Section 5. species (Adromischus marianae)

Pale or pubescent inflorescence with elongated, lanceolate-triangular lobes.

- Adromischus cooperi
- Adromischus cristatus
  - Adromischus cristatus var. clavifolius
  - Adromischus cristatus var. mzimvubuensis
  - Adromischus cristatus var. schonlandii
  - Adromischus cristatus var. zeyheri
- Adromischus leucophyllus
- Adromischus marianiae
  - Adromischus marianiae var. hallii
  - Adromischus marianiae var. immaculatus
  - Adromischus marianiae var. kubusensis
  - Adromischus marianiae 'Alveolatus'
  - Adromischus marianiae 'Antidorcatum'
  - Adromischus marianiae 'Bryan Makin'
  - Adromischus marianiae 'Herrei'
  - Adromischus marianiae 'Little Spheroid'
  - Adromischus marianiae 'Red Mutation'
  - Adromischus marianiae 'Tanqua'
- Adromischus subviridis

So-called Adromischus oviforme specimens are actually Adromischus filicaulis subsp. marlothii; Adromischus oviforme doesn't actually exist.

== Species gallery ==
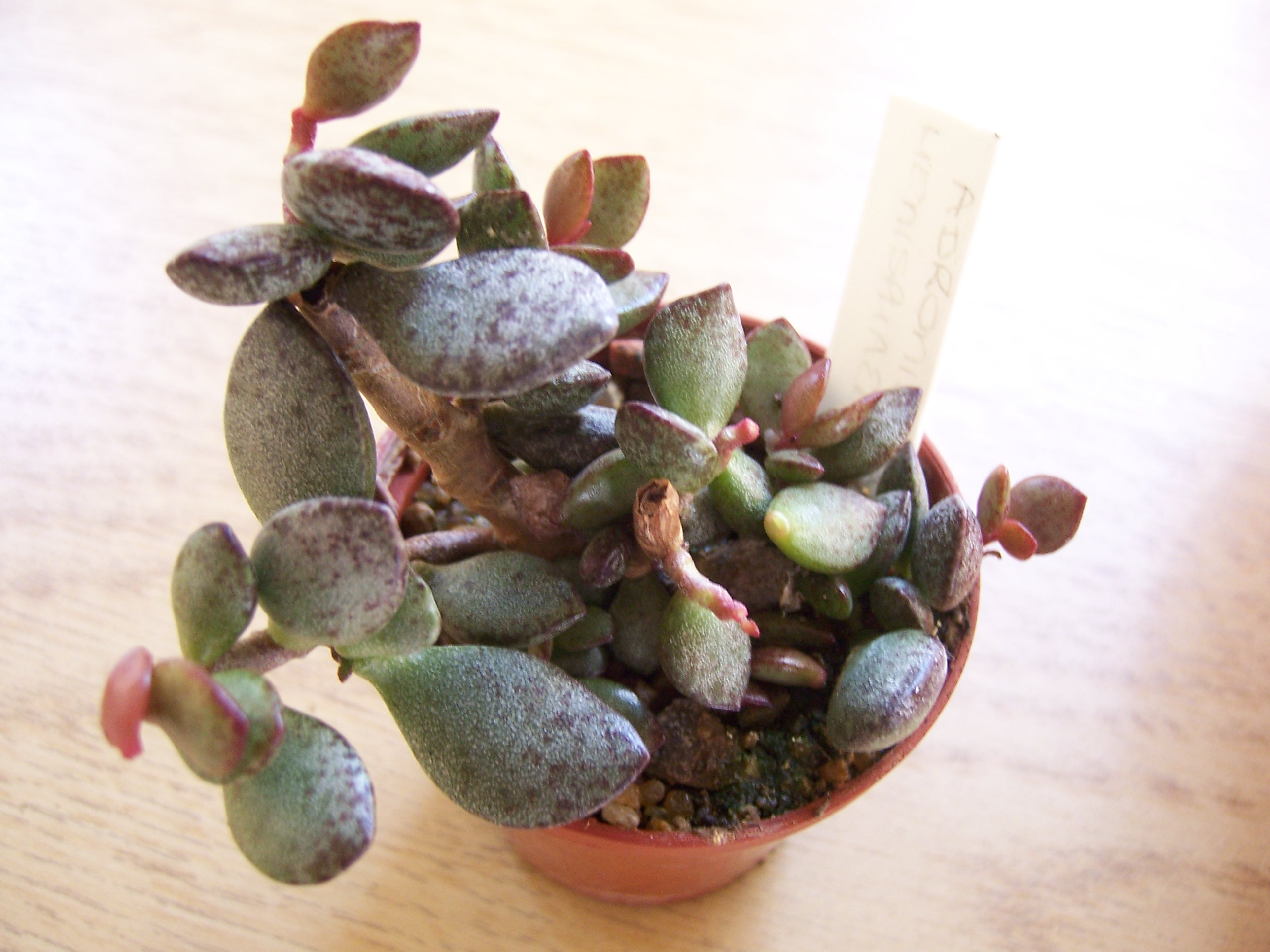
Adromischus hemisphaericus

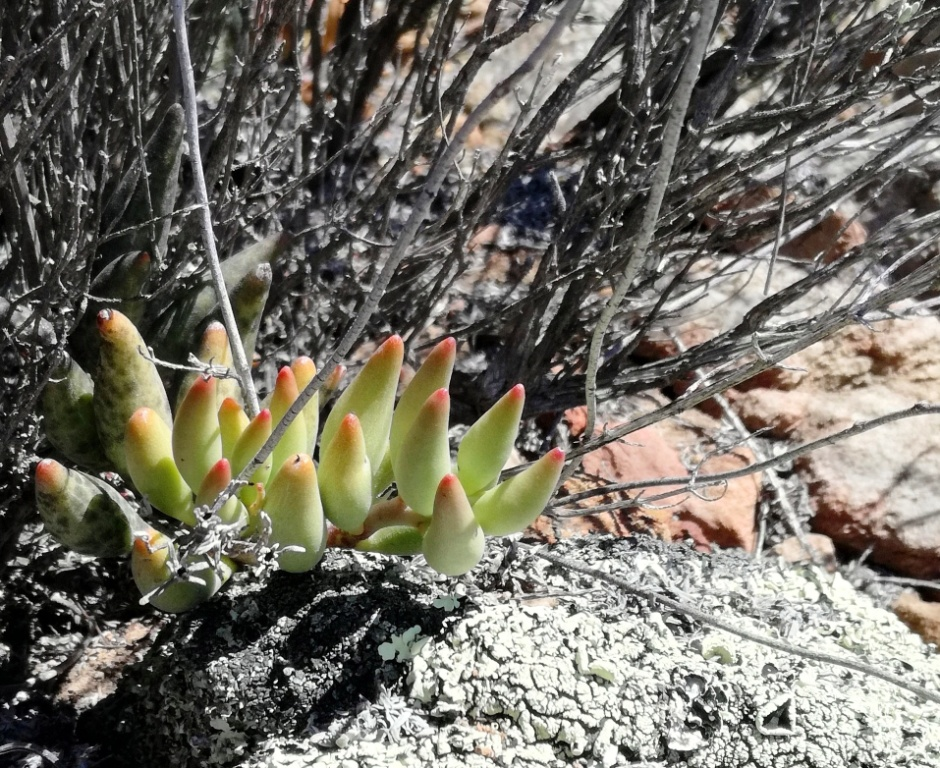
Adromischus filicaulis

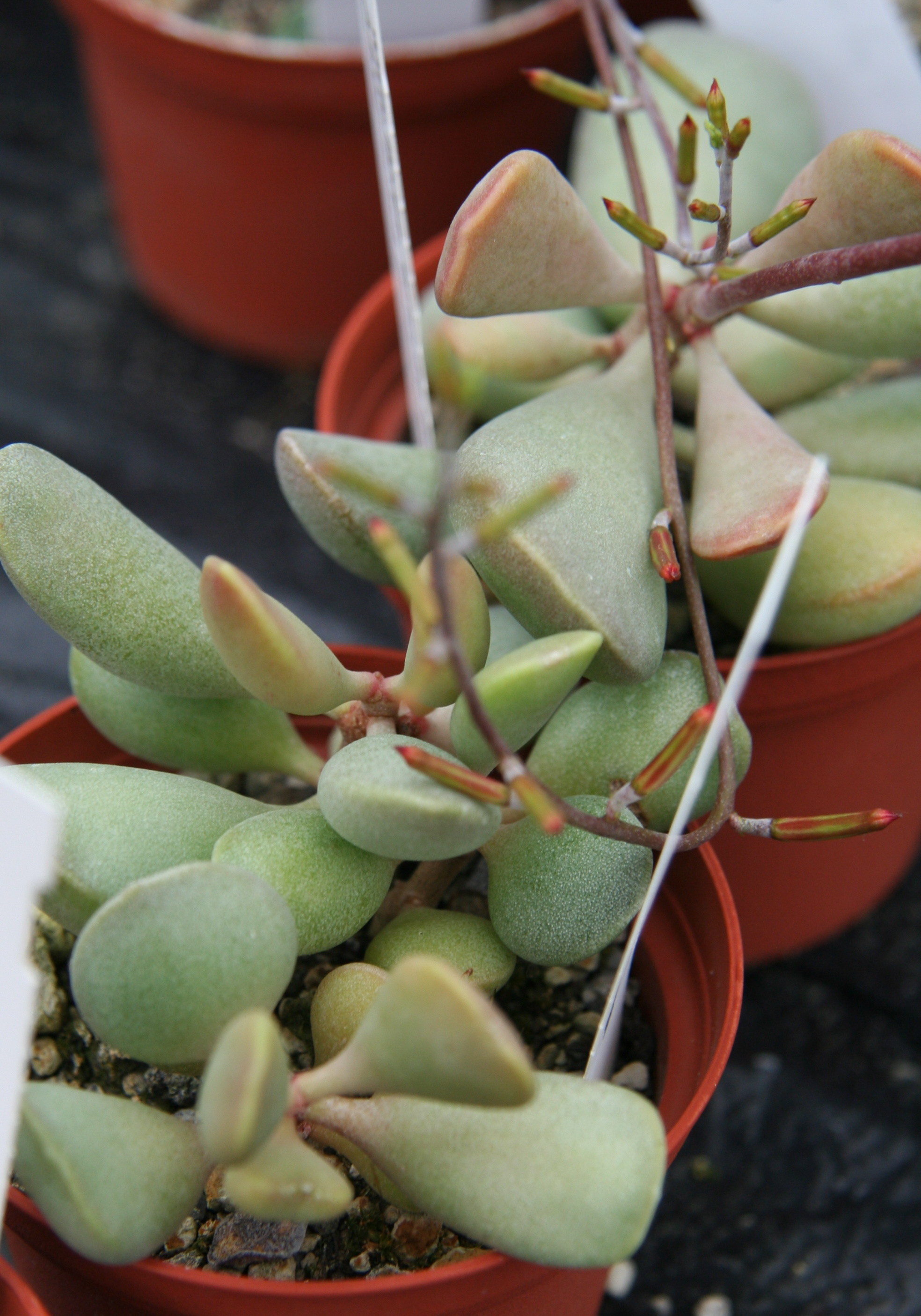
Adromischus liebenbergii

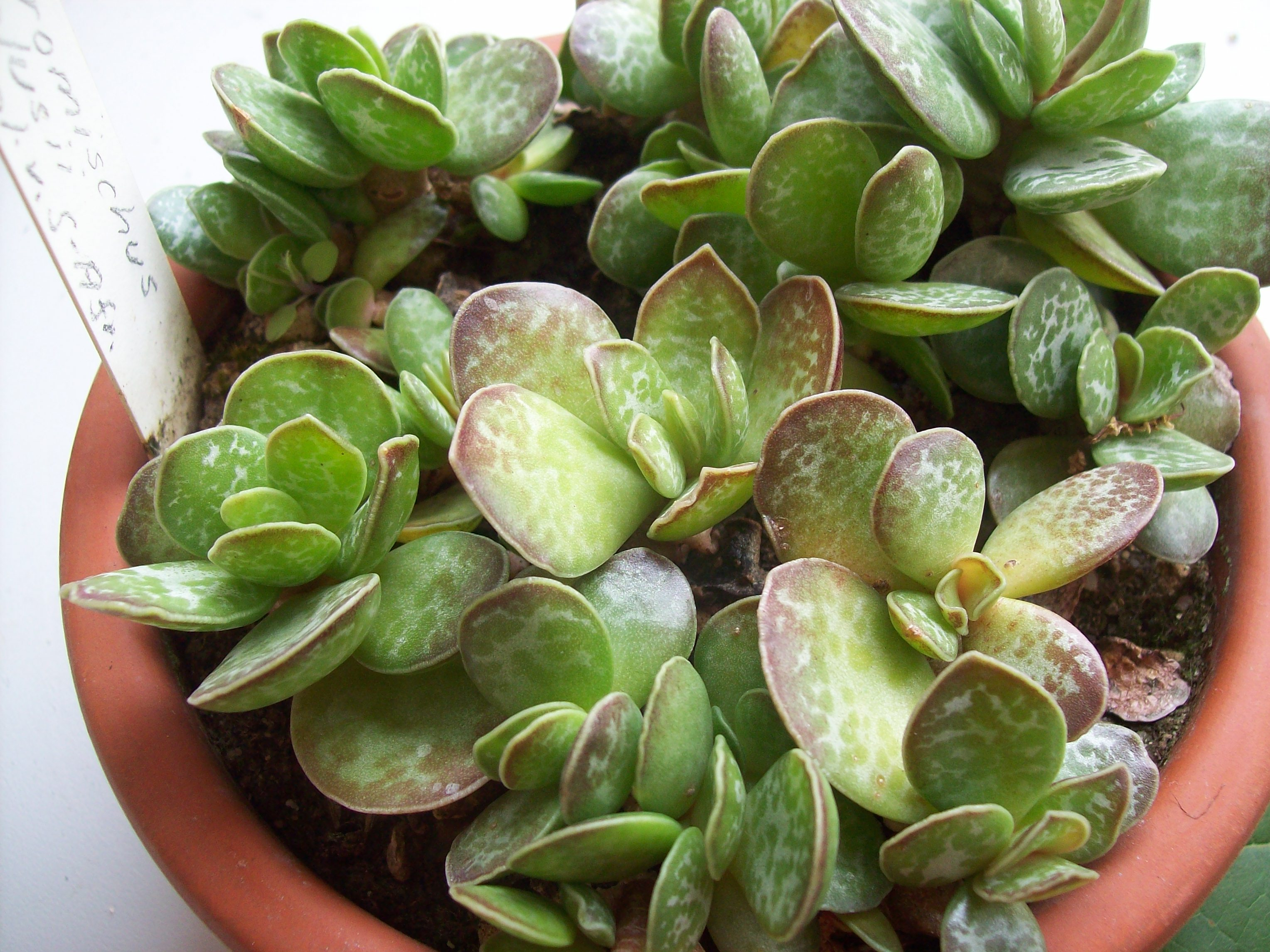
Adromischus caryophyllaceus

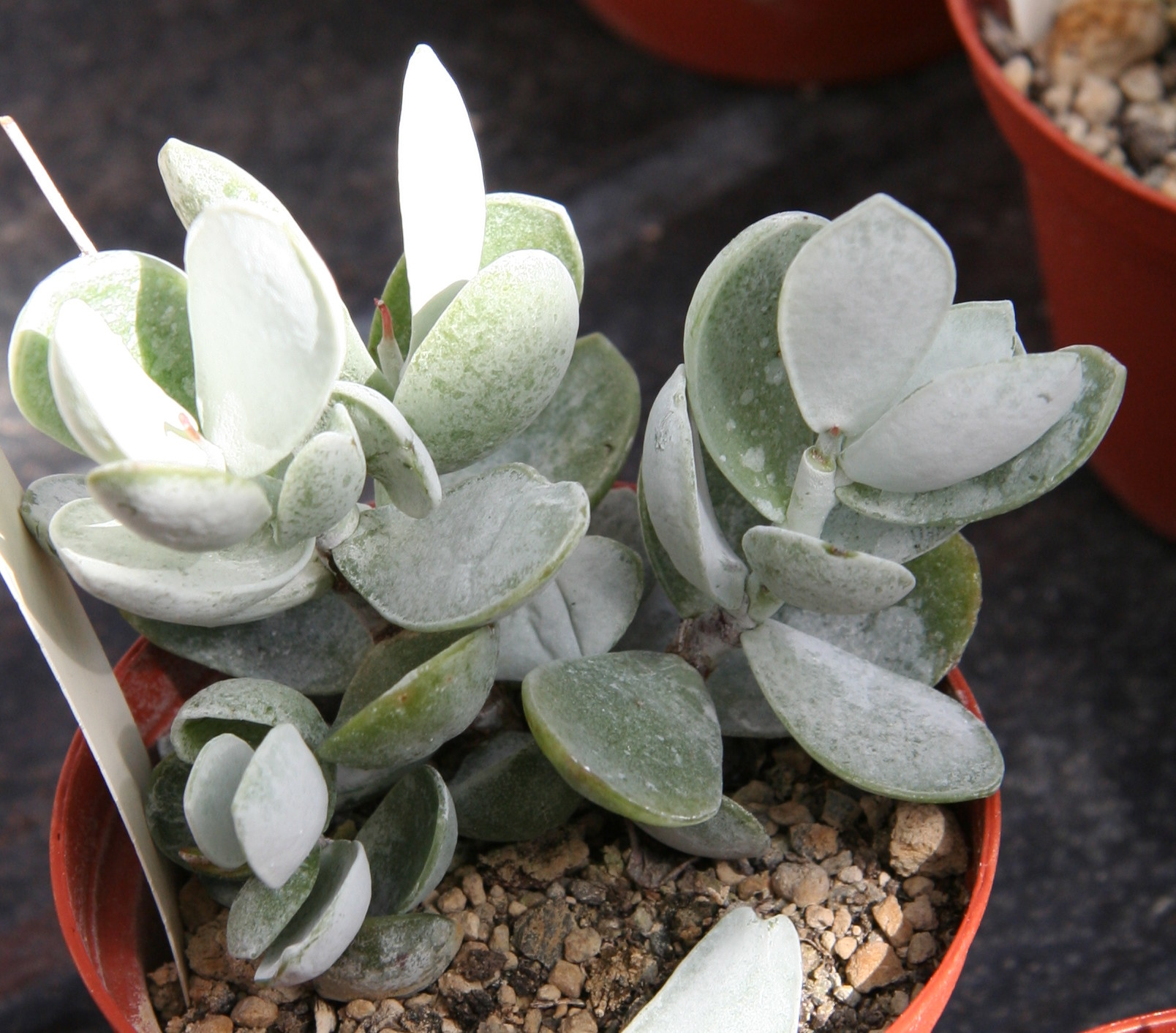
Adromischus leucophyllus

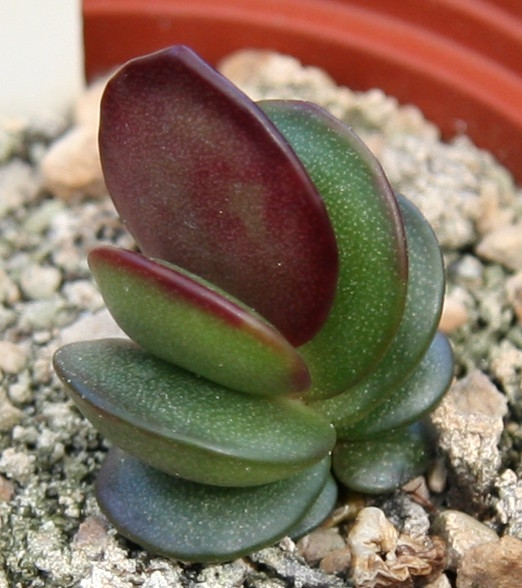
Adromischus subdistichus

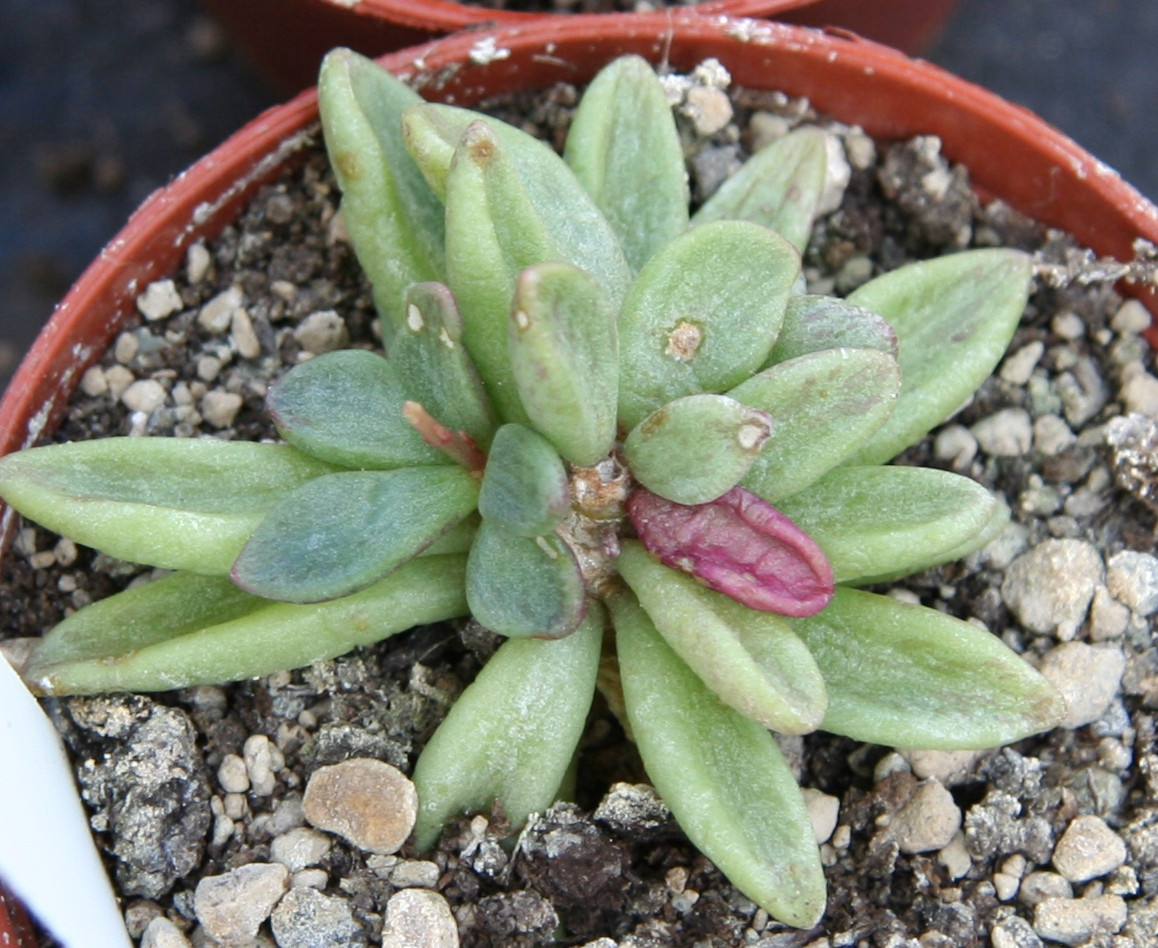
Adromischus humilis

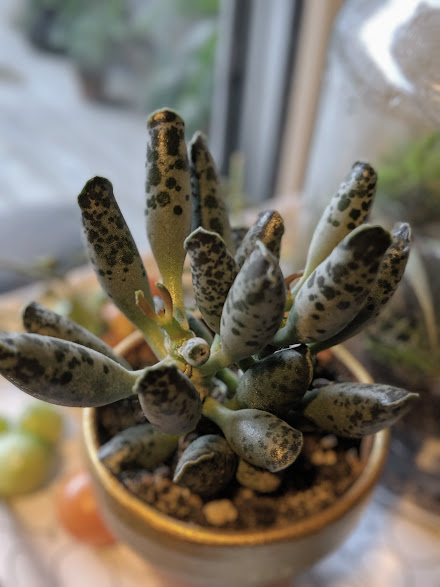
Adromischus cooperi (festivus)

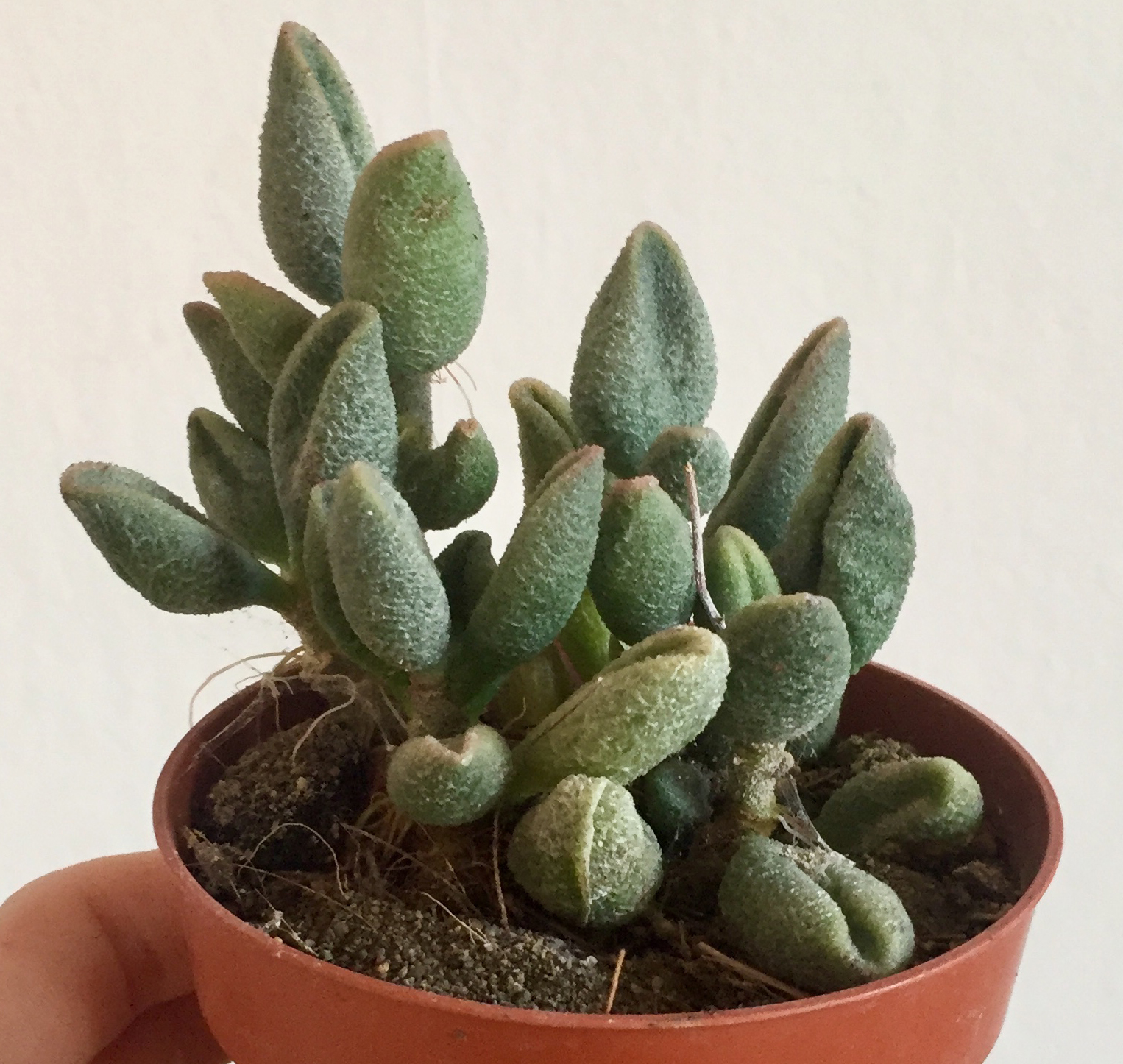
Adromischus marianiae 'Aveolatus'
