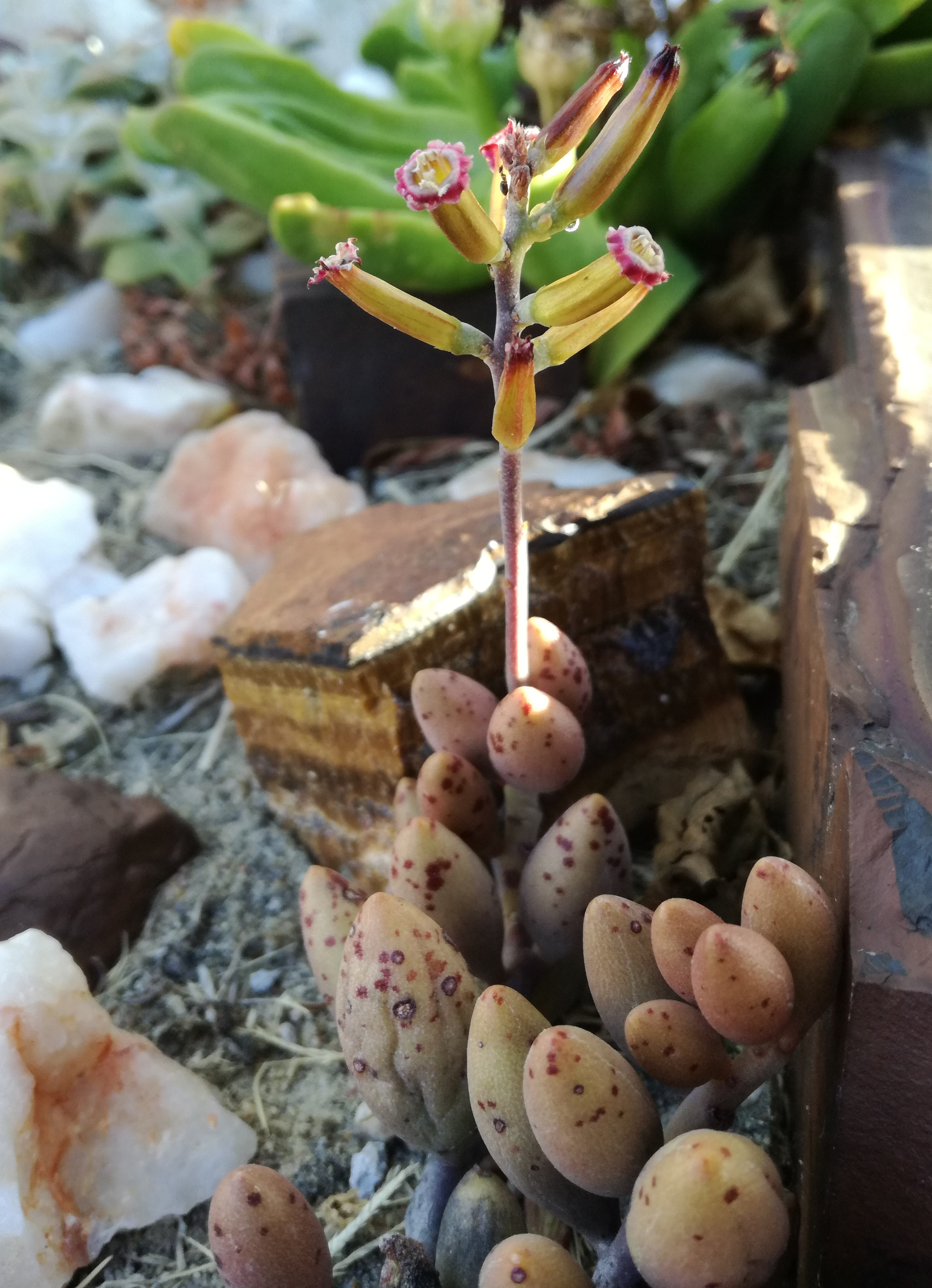
- Flowering specimen of subspecies filicaulis
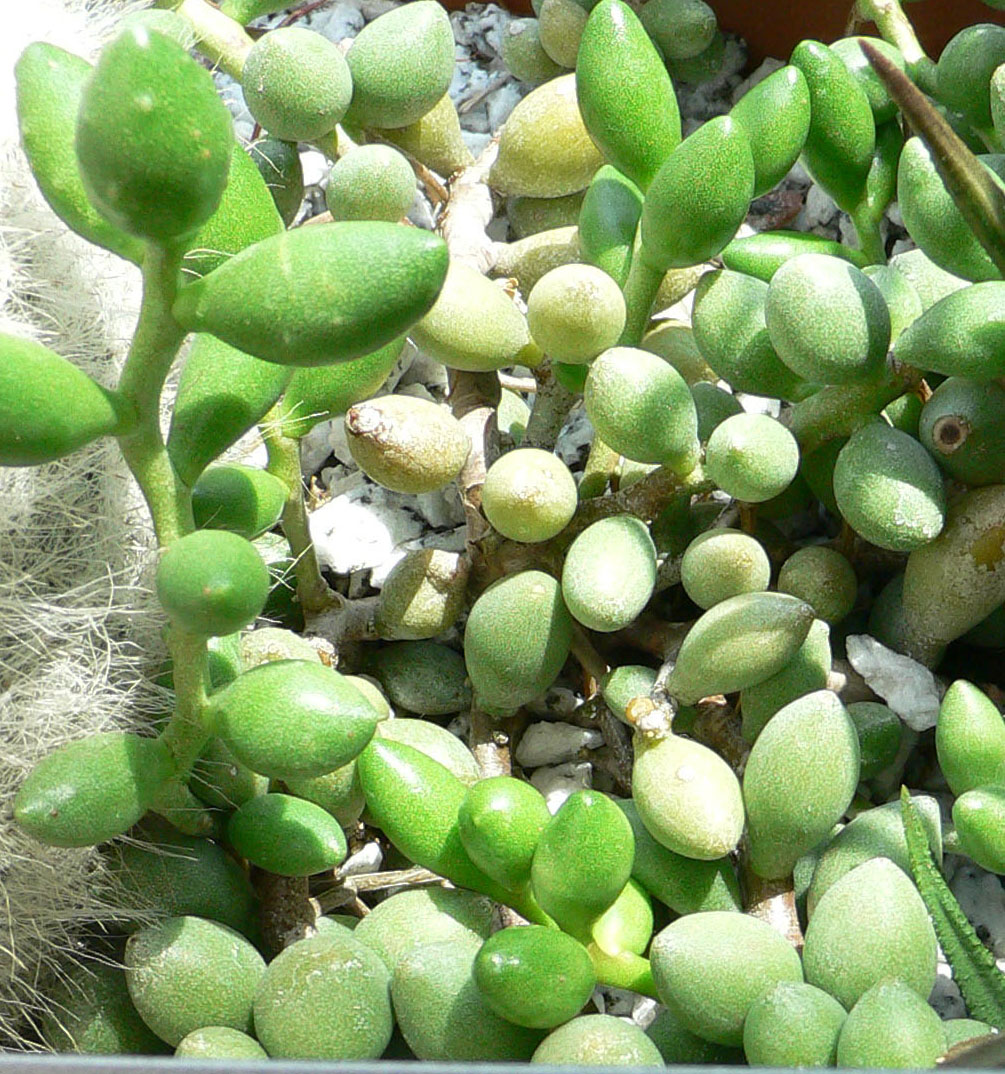
- Subspecies marlothii

Conservation status
- Least Concern (SANBI Red List)

Scientific classification
- Kingdom: Plantae
- Clade: Tracheophytes
- Clade: Angiosperms
- Clade: Eudicots
- Order: Saxifragales
- Family: Crassulaceae
- Genus: Adromischus
- Species: A. filicaulis

Binomial name
- Adromischus filicaulis (Ecklon & Zeyher) C.A.Smith, 1939
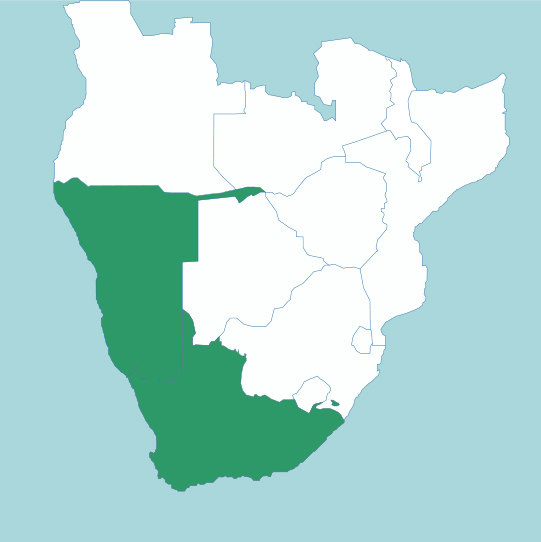

Synonyms
- Cotyledon fusiformis Rolfe (1916); Adromischus fusiformis (Rolfe) A.Berger (1930); Adromischus mammillaris var. fusiformis (Rolfe) H.Jacobsen (1970); Adromischus mammillaris var. rubra von Poellnitz (1938); Adromischus kleinioides C.A.Smith (1939); Adromischus fragilis Hutchison (1959); Adromischus fragilis var. numeesensis Hutchison (1959)

= Adromischus filicaulis =

Species of succulent plant

Adromischus filicaulis is a perennial, succulent plant in the family Crassulaceae. It is commonly called brosplakkies in Afrikaans. The species is endemic to South Africa and Namibia.

== Taxonomy ==
Adromischus filicaulis is separated into two subspecies: A. filicaulis subs. filicaulis, and A. filicaulis subs. marlothii.

== Etymology ==
The genus name, Adromischus, comes from Greek, Adro- meaning 'thick' and -mischus meaning 'stem'. Filicaulis comes from Latin, meaning 'with thread-like stem'. The subspecies name marlothii, like other succulent species, was chosen to honor the South African botanist, Rudolf Marloth.

== Description ==
A. f. filicaulis has been found to vary widely depending on locality, and some say the group could be classified into more than two subspecies. They form small clumps of upright to decumbent-growing plants. Their short, sparse, upward-growing branches are grey-brown and reach 12 mm in diameter. Some examples grow compact, with leaves covering the stem, and others grow with more space between each leaf. The leaves range from 3 cm to 9.5 cm long and 0.5 cm to 1.7 cm wide. They are oblong, sometimes flat on the upper face, with pointed tips. Leaves range from short and plump to long and slender. Sometimes the grey-green leaves have purple spots. The inflorescences can reach 35 cm tall in mid-summer. The sparse flowers are tubular with yellow-green sepals that are tinged with red at the tips. The 2 mm, triangular petals range from white to tinged with pink.

A. f. marlothii shows similarly variability, but differs in its growth habit along the ground and in growing supportive stilt roots, sometimes called aerial roots, which grow from nodes along the stem and root into the soil below. It is sparsely branched and sometimes grows upright branches.

== Distribution and habitat ==
Both subspecies can be found in the Northern Cape and Southern Cape, and the Succulent Karoo, South Africa. A. f. filicaulis can also be found as far north as Namibia. The species grows near and in false fynbos. Individuals from east of Vanrhynsdorp have more slender, long leaves, and grow straight branches.
