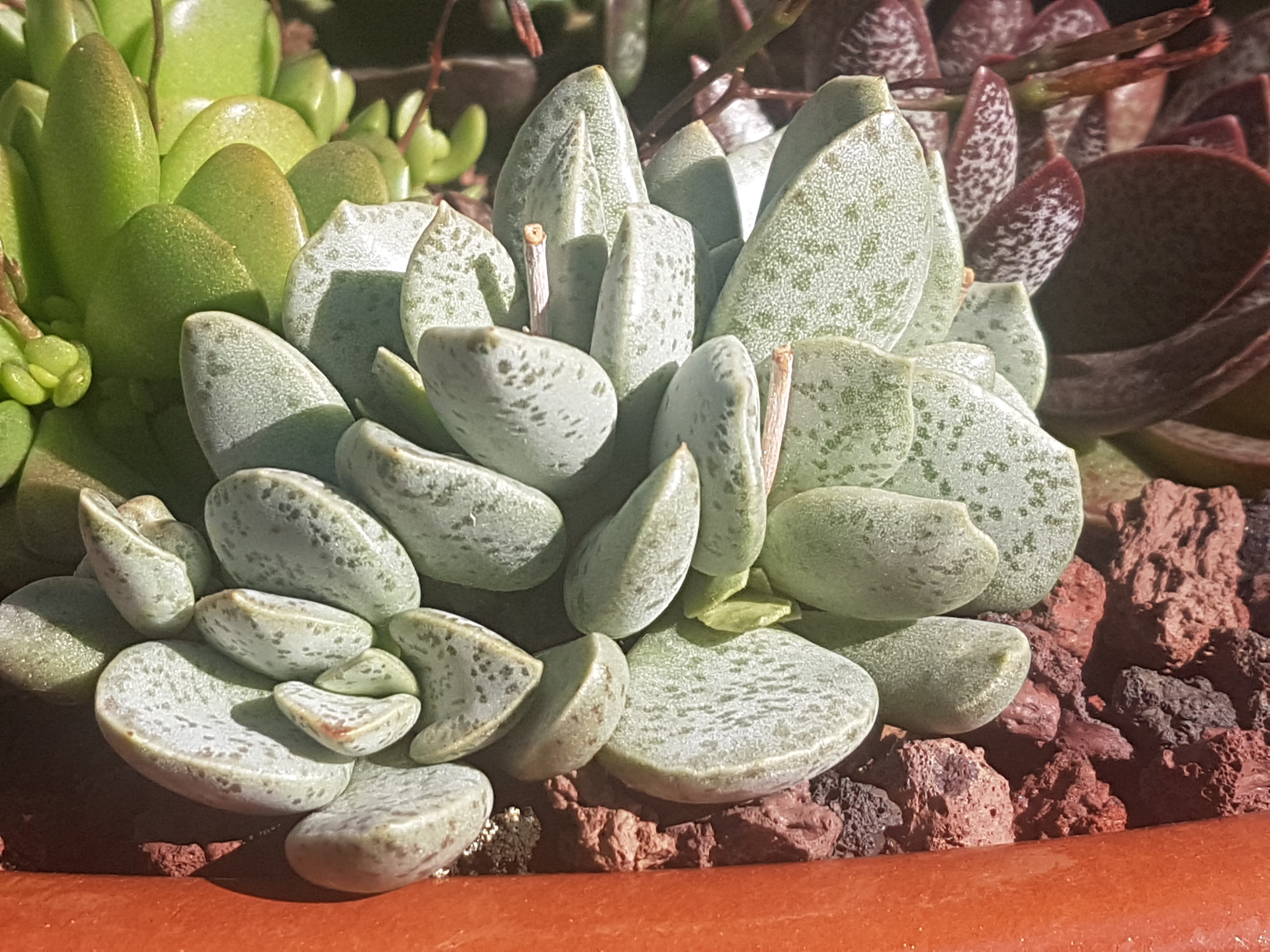

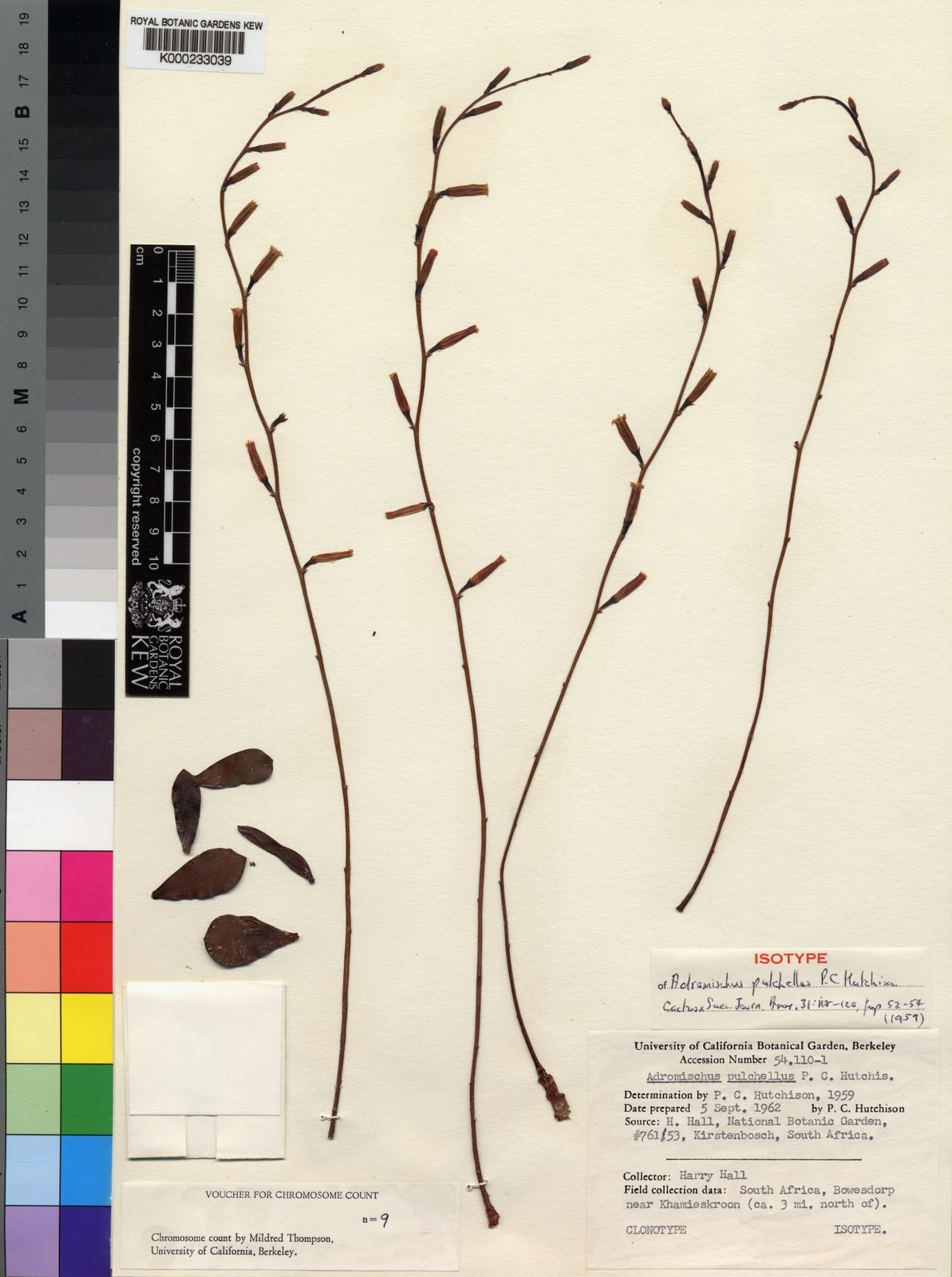
- Specimen pressing from Kew's herbarium catalogue

Conservation status
- Least Concern (SANBI Red List)

Scientific classification
- Kingdom: Plantae
- Clade: Tracheophytes
- Clade: Angiosperms
- Clade: Eudicots
- Order: Saxifragales
- Family: Crassulaceae
- Genus: Adromischus
- Species: A. alstonii

Binomial name
- Adromischus alstonii (Schönland & Baker f.) C.A.Smith, 1939
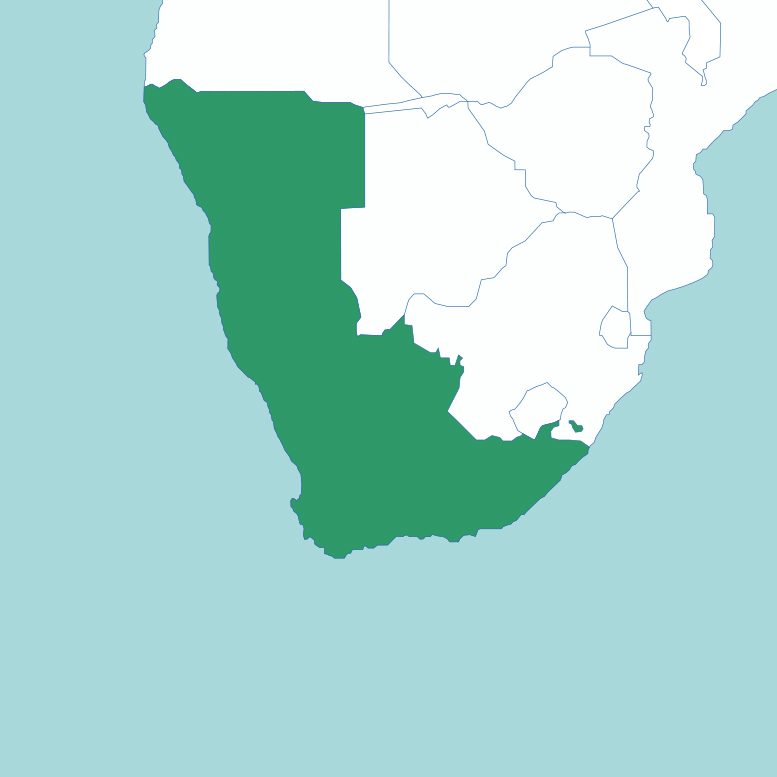
- A. alstonii distribution

Synonyms
- Cotyledon alstonii Schönland & Baker f. (1902); Adromischus triebneri von Poellnitz (1939); Adromischus subrubellus von Poellnitz (1941); Adromischus pulchellus Hutchison (1959)

= Adromischus alstonii =

Species of plant

Adromischus alstonii is a species of succulent plant from the family Crassulaceae. The species name is the namesake of Edward Garwood Alston, who was a plant enthusiast from Cape Province, South Africa. A. alstonii is endemic to the Succulent Karoo in the Northern Cape, South Africa.

== Description ==
Adromischus alstonii is an upright-growing, terrestrial, succulent bush reaching 30 cm. The branches grow variably decumbent to erect with grey, grey-green, or brown-green, peeling bark. Mature branches can reach 1.4 cm in diameter. The grey leaves sometimes have purplish spots or splotches. They can grow to 8 cm long and 4.3 cm wide. They are narrow at the base, the topsides of the leaves are flat, and the undersides are also flat but can be convex. The inflorescences grow to 52 cm high, with sparsely-arranged flowers. The tubular, green-brown sepals are topped with white or slightly pink, triangular petals. A. alstonii blooms in mid-summer.

== Distribution & Habitat ==
It is found growing among rock outcrops and lower slopes, from South West Africa to the north-western Cape Province. Populations can be found through Richtersveld and Namaqualand to Garies. It prefers to grow sheltered under bushes and in rock crevices.

== Cultivation ==
Adromischus alstonii's succulent leaves allow for long periods of drought, wrinkling when they are ready for water. It requires a free-draining, gritty soil mix. In order for the purple spots to show, it needs plenty of sun. Can tolerate temperatures down to 5°C if kept dry. Like other Adromischus species, A. alstonii can be easily propagated by leaf or steam cuttings.
