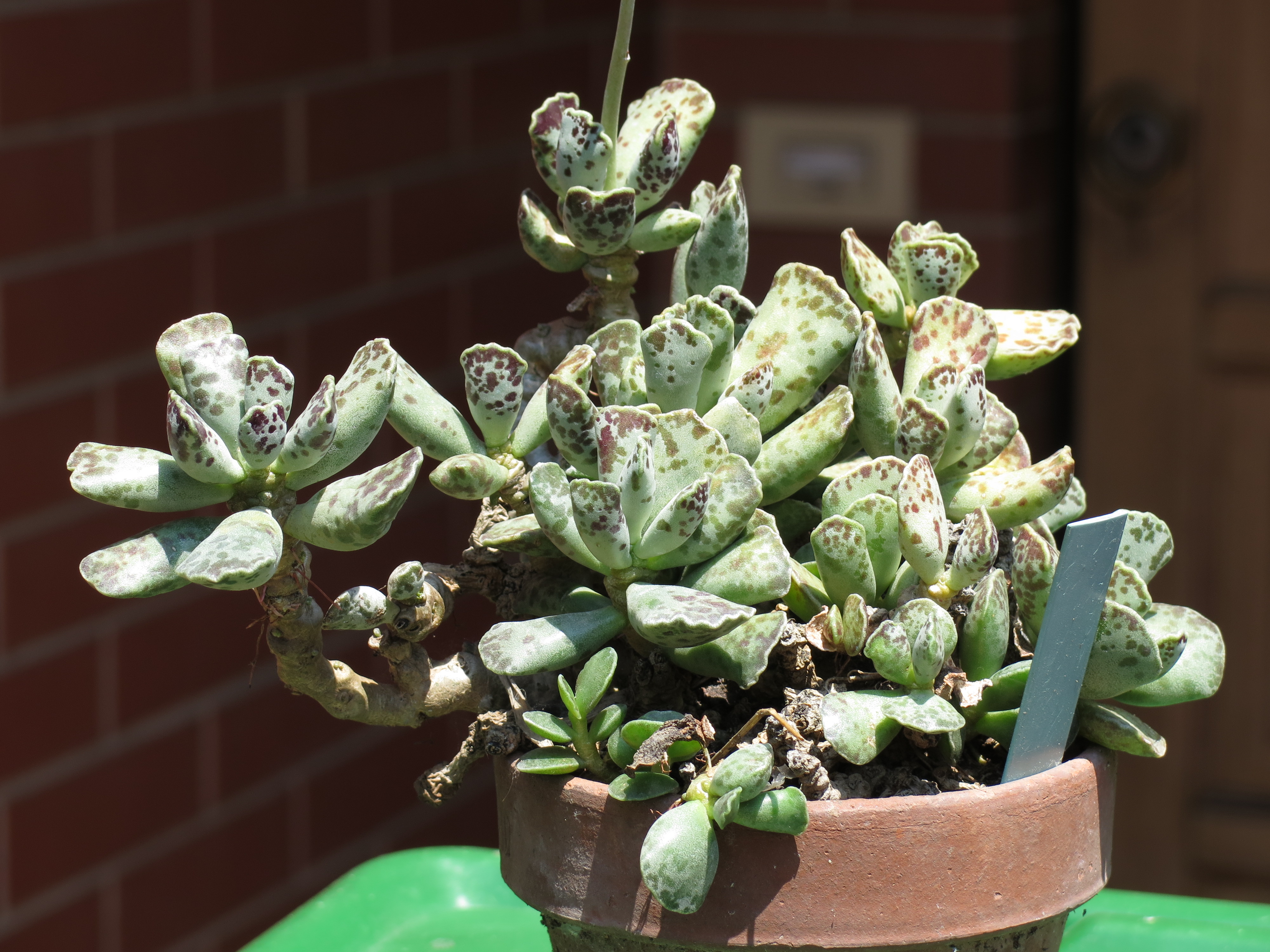

Conservation status
- Least Concern (IUCN 3.1)

Scientific classification
- Kingdom: Plantae
- Clade: Tracheophytes
- Clade: Angiosperms
- Clade: Eudicots
- Order: Saxifragales
- Family: Crassulaceae
- Genus: Adromischus
- Species: A. cooperi

Binomial name
- Adromischus cooperi (Baker) A.Berger

Synonyms
- Cotyledon cooperi Schönland & Baker f.

= Adromischus cooperi =

Species of plant

Adromischus cooperi is a species of succulent plant from the family Crassulaceae. The genus name Adromischus comes from ancient Greek adros (meaning "thick") and mischos (meaning "stem"), and the species name from Thomas Cooper. The plant is endemic to the Eastern Cape of South Africa.

== Description ==
Adromischus cooperi (syn. Cotyledon cooperi) is a small perennial plant, growing to around 10 cm high. It is almost acaulescent with a compact appearance. The leaves are very fleshy and narrow at the base, with distinctive wavy ends. Given strong sun, the leaves show brown or reddish blotches.

It is a slow-growing species that becomes slightly tree-like with age; over several years it develops one or more rather thick, succulent, trunks. The flowers of A. cooperi are insignificant, small in size, and held on an upright stem.

== Cultivation ==
This is an easy plant to grow, but it needs bright sunlight to bring out the dark-colored ornamental spots on the leaves. It survives dry conditions, which cause shrinkage of the leaves, although they re-inflate when the plant is watered. During winter it should be placed in a dry, bright position with a temperature of around 12 °C; it can, however, tolerate a temperature slightly below freezing (to around −2 °C). It needs heavy watering in summer.

Adromischus cooperi can be reproduced easily from cuttings of the leaves taken during the non-flowering period.
