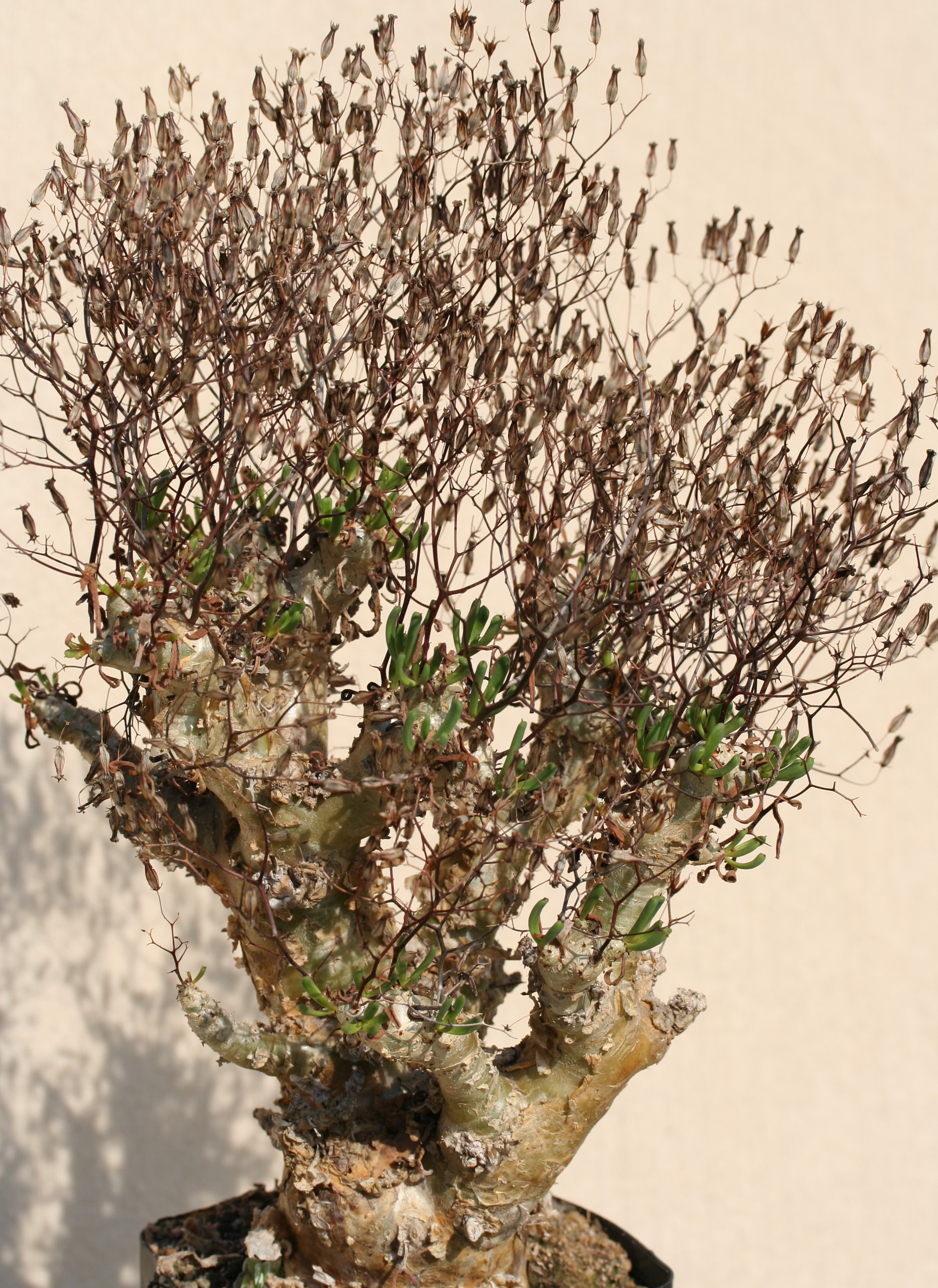

Conservation status
- Least Concern (IUCN 3.1)

Scientific classification
- Kingdom: Plantae
- Clade: Tracheophytes
- Clade: Angiosperms
- Clade: Eudicots
- Order: Saxifragales
- Family: Crassulaceae
- Genus: Tylecodon
- Species: T. reticulatus

Binomial name
- Tylecodon reticulatus (L.f.) Toelken

Synonyms
- Cotyledon reticulata L.f.

= Tylecodon reticulatus =

Species of succulent

Tylecodon reticulatus is a species of succulent plant in the genus Tylecodon belonging to the family Crassulaceae.

== Description ==
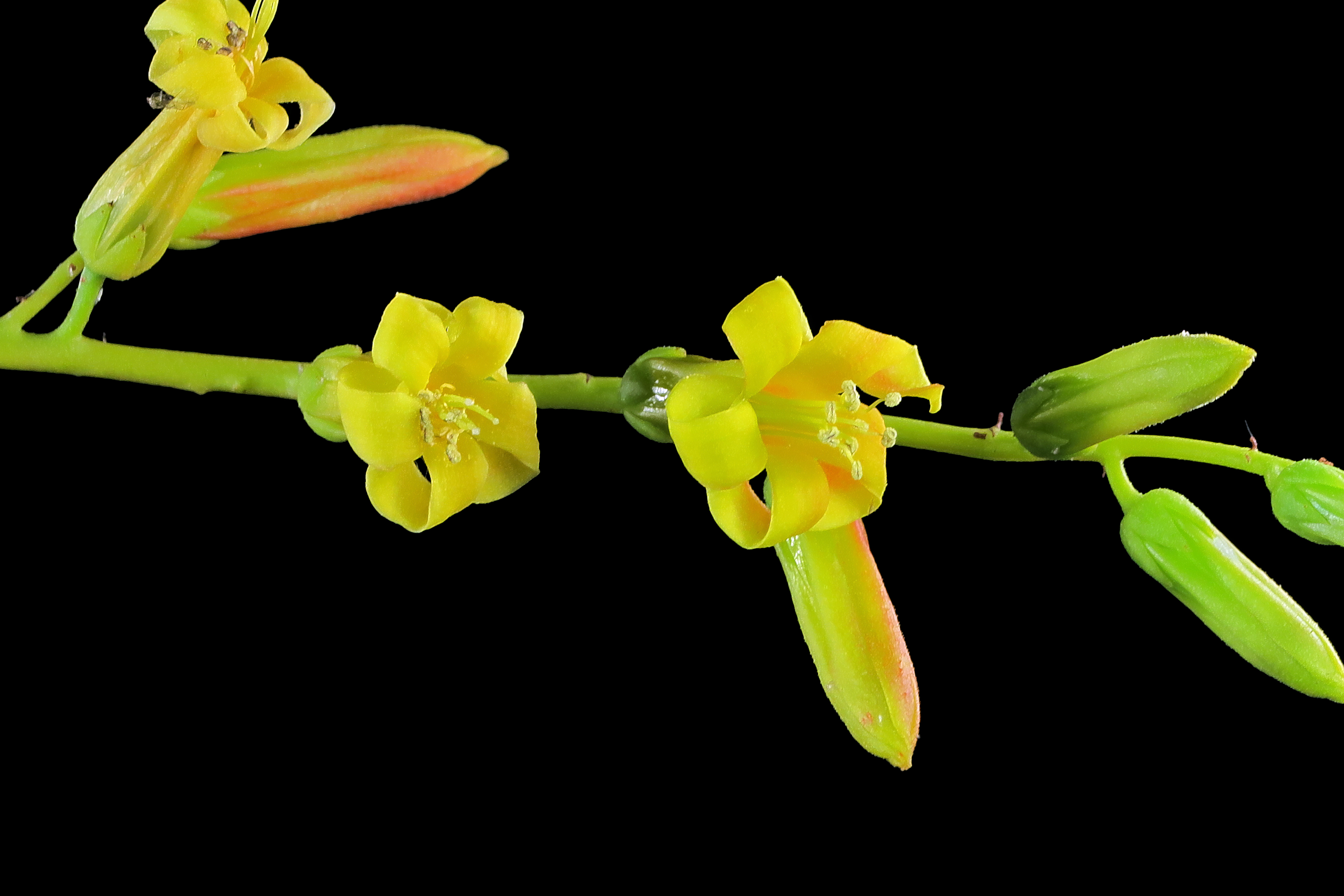
Detail of Tylecodon reticulatus flowers. Private garden in Berkeley, CA.

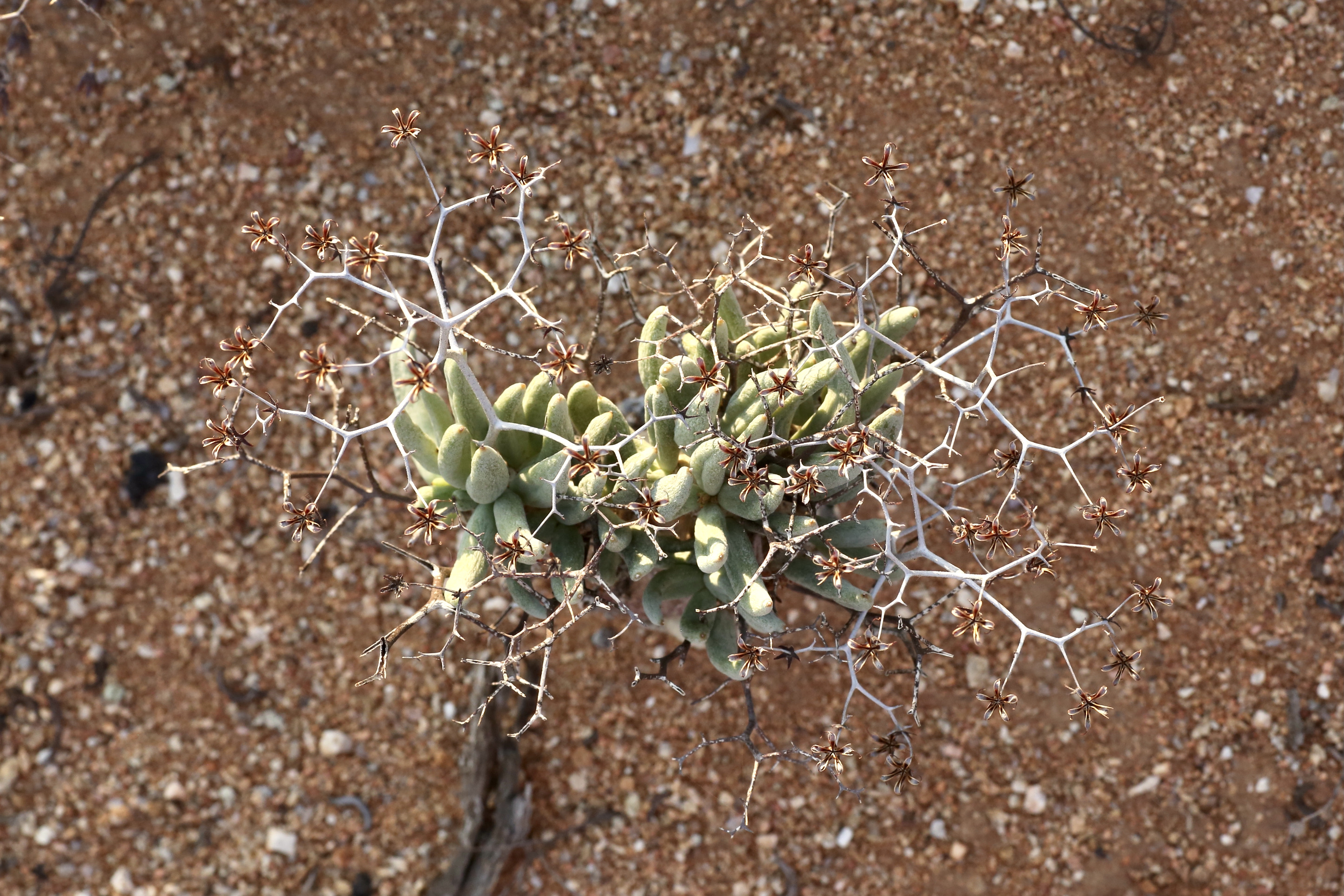
Tylecodon reticulatus subsp. reticulatus in summer Springbok. After anthesis dry sepals become loose and star-shaped but remain attached to their pedicels.

Tylecodon reticulatus is a small to medium-sized, tree-like shrublet with a squat, basally normally solitary stem, up to 6 cm thick and 3–38 cm tall with a round sparsely branched crown to 30 cm in diameter with light brown bark peeling in strips. Young stems of Tylecodon reticulatus subsp. phyllopodium have residual leaf bases (phyllopodia) which remain visible for several years. Leaves are crowded at branch tips, erect to ascending, 5–40 mm long and 3–10 mm tick, ovate, linear-lanceolate to liner-oblanceolate, glabrous to glandular-hairy, coloured from bluish-green to heavily pink-tinged. Inflorescences are finely branched thyrses to 7 cm tall and in diameter, with many dichasia each bearing 2–6 spreading to erect greenish yellow, tubular or swollen at base flowers, 6–8 mm long, 2.5 mm in diameter, laxly hairy, spreading and becoming recurved. The flowers persist after blossoming, so they form a dense reticulate crown above branches and leaves, hence the species name.

== Distribution ==
Succulent Karoo, quartz gravel flats of South Namibia and RSA (Northern and Western Cape).

== Subspecies ==
- Tylecodon reticulatus subsp. phyllopodium (Harv.) Toelken — southern Namibia through to northern Namaqualand near Komaggas.
- Tylecodon reticulatus subsp. reticulatus — southern Namibia southwards to the western parts of RCA's Great Karoo towards Beaufort West and Graaf-Reinet.
