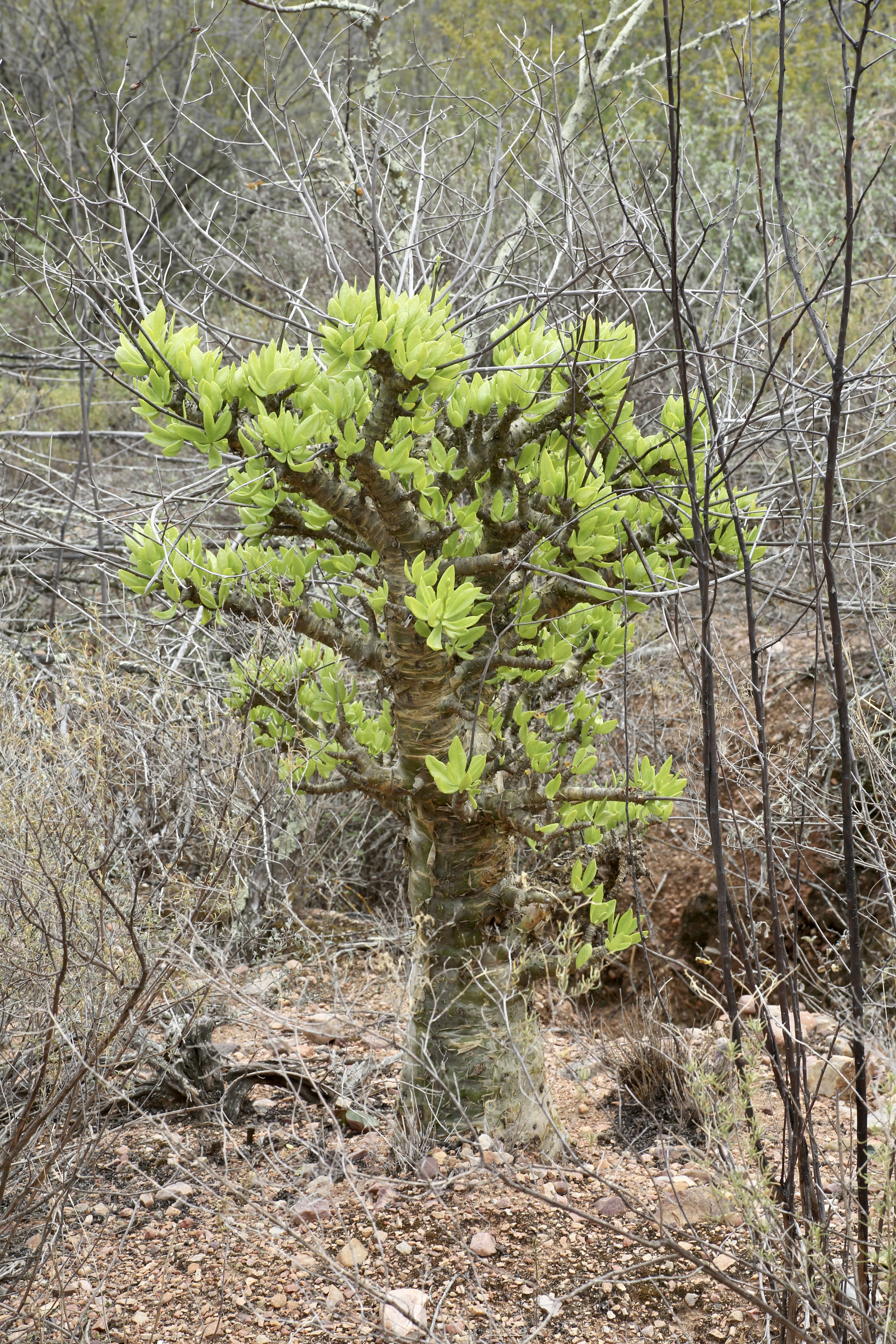
- Tylecodon paniculatus in Rooiberg Nature Reserve, South Africa.

Conservation status
- Least Concern (IUCN 3.1)

Scientific classification
- Kingdom: Plantae
- Clade: Tracheophytes
- Clade: Angiosperms
- Clade: Eudicots
- Order: Saxifragales
- Family: Crassulaceae
- Genus: Tylecodon
- Species: T. paniculatus

Binomial name
- Tylecodon paniculatus (L.f.) Toelken (1978)

Synonyms
- Cotyledon paniculata L.f.

= Tylecodon paniculatus =

Species of succulent

Tylecodon paniculatus, also known as butter bush, butter tree, butterboom or rooisuikerblom (Afrikaans), is a species of succulent plant in the genus Tylecodon belonging to the family Crassulaceae.

== Etymology ==
The genus name is a syllabic anagram of the former name Cotyledon, created by Helmut Toelken who split a few species off into a genus of their own.

The species Latin epithet refers to the shape of inflorescence — branched terminal panicles.

The common names refer to soft, fleshy and brittle stems. For centuries children have used the soft, slippery stems as sleds.

== Description ==
Tylecodon paniculatus is a thickset, robust succulent dwarf tree up to 2.5–3 m tall, with very fat stems with usually well branched rounded crown. The single main trunk and branches are covered with mustard-yellow to olive-green bark peeling in papery semi-translucent sheets. Branches are short, with prominent leaf scars. Leaves are clustered and spirally arranged around the apex of the growing tips simple during the wintertime; they are paddle-shaped, 5–12 cm long and 2–10 cm wide, thickly succulent, bright yellowish-green; apex is broadly tapering to rounded, base is tapering without petiole. The plant is deciduous. Inflorescences are spectacular slender, ascending thyrses to 40 cm, with bright crimson-red stalks. Flowers have five joined sepals and five joined petals, forming an orange-yellow to red urn-shaped tube 1.5–2.5 cm long with spreading lobes. Ten stamens are pendulous at first, then upright as the petal-tube dries.

It hybridises with Tylecodon wallichii.

== Habitat ==
Rocky slopes in Succulent Karoo.

== Distribution ==
The species grows in the arid, winter rain-fall regions from Namibia to the southwestern South Africa.

== Toxicity ==
The plant contains bufadienolide-type cardiac glycoside cotyledoside which causes cotyledonosis or nenta poisoning ("krimpsiekte") in sheep and goats.

== Subspecies ==
- Tylecodon paniculatus subsp. paniculatus — southwestern Namibia through to Cape Province.
- Tylecodon paniculatus subsp. glaucus van Jaarsv. — Namibia.

== Gallery ==
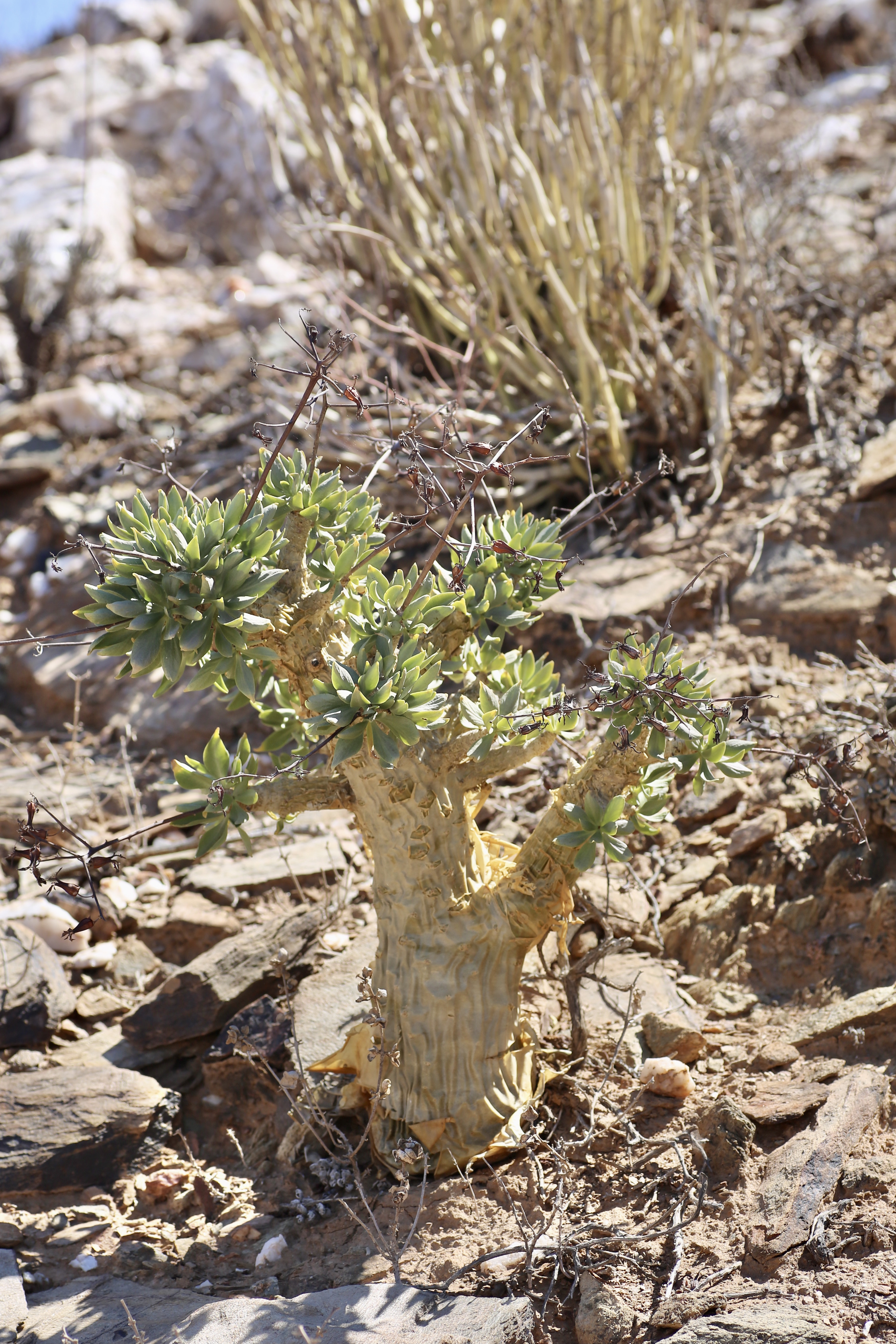
Young plant in the early spring in Richtersveld.

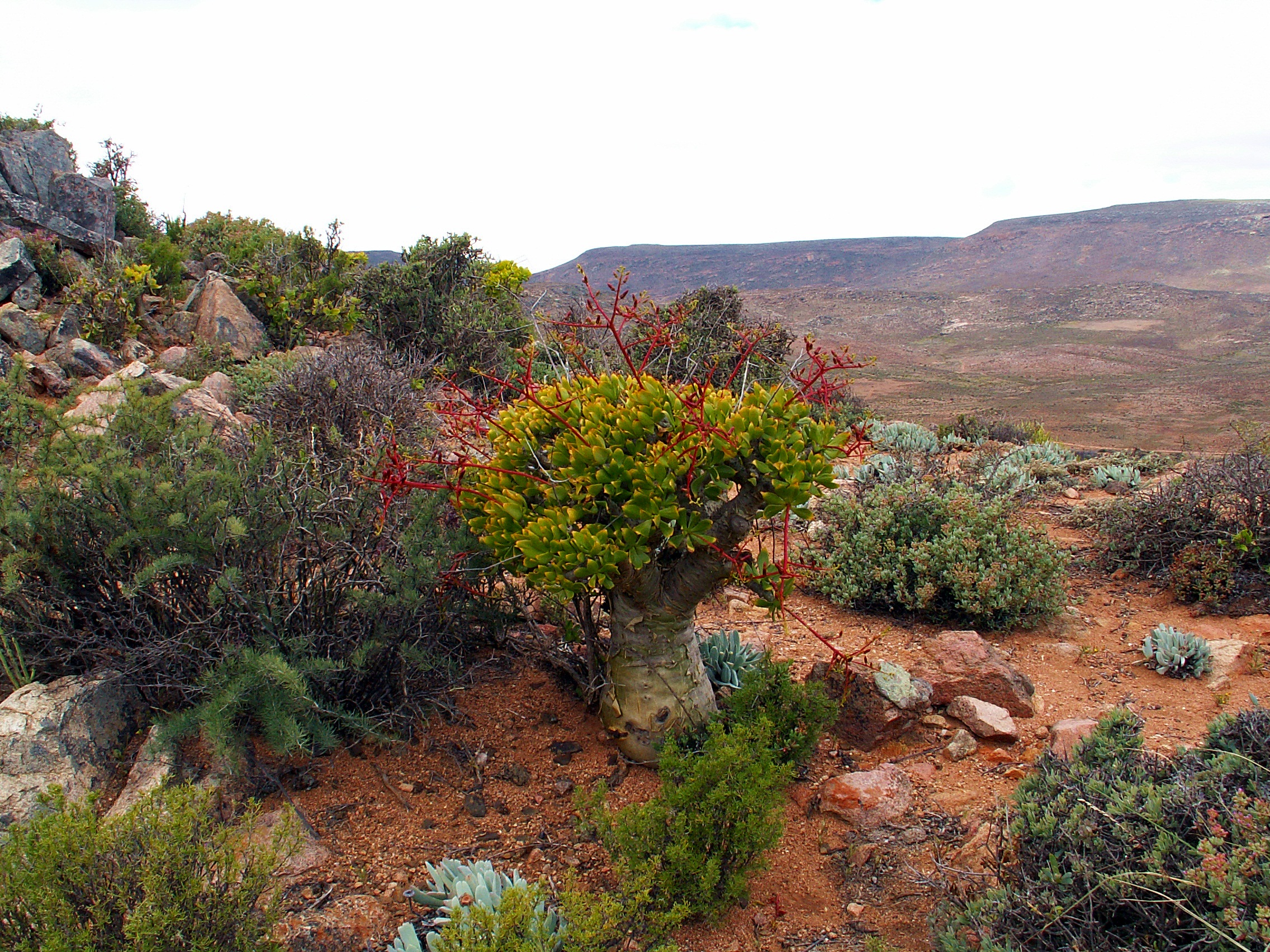
Flowering plant in ǀAi-ǀAis/Richtersveld Transfrontier Park.

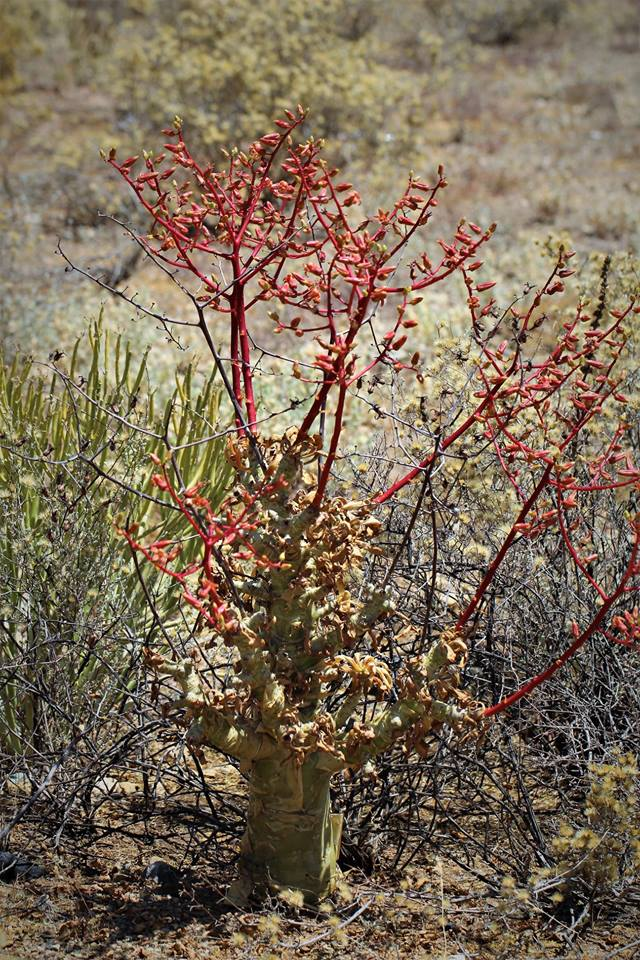
Inflorescences are borne in late spring to mid-summer just as the plant sheds its leaves.

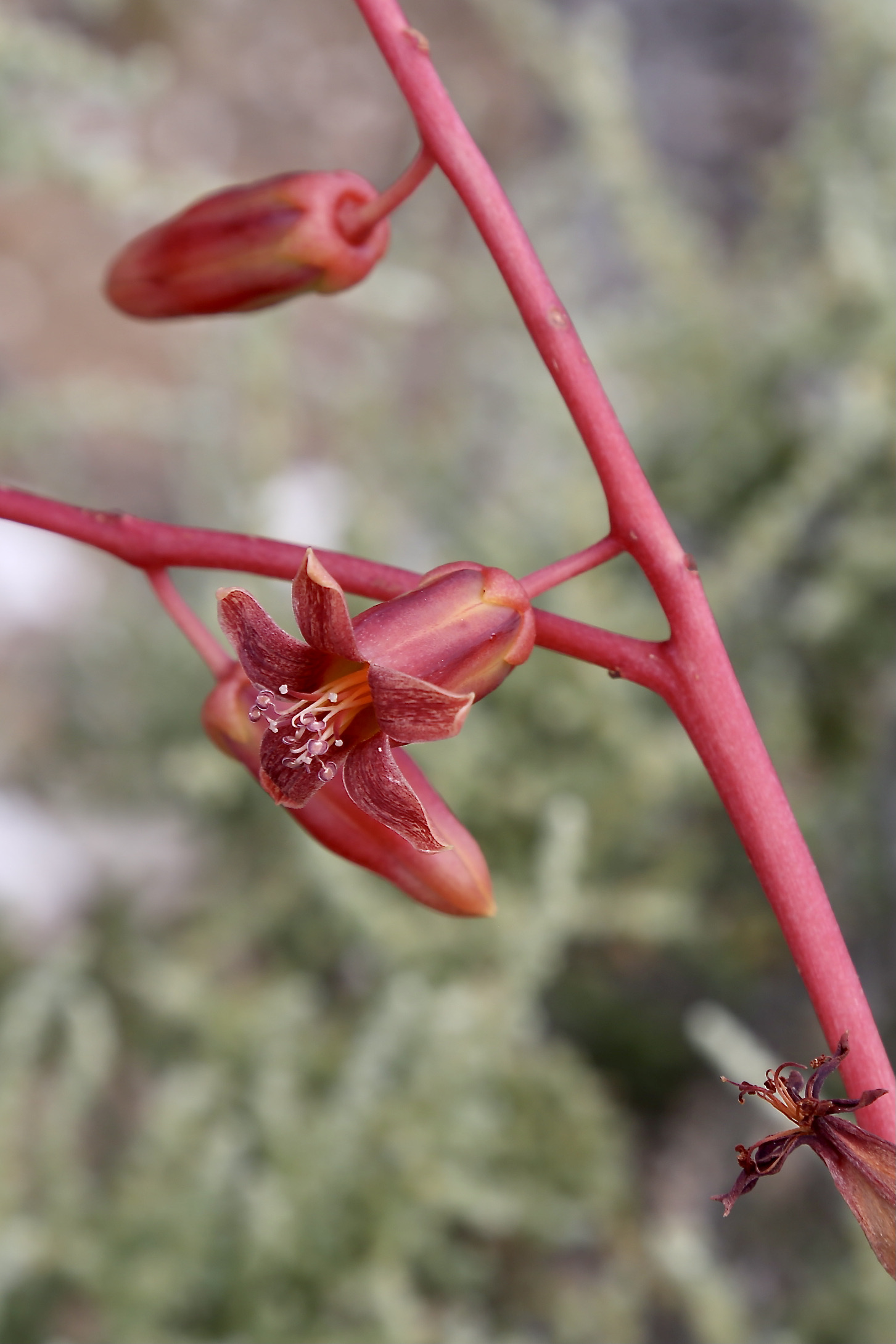
Flowers in Anysberg Nature Reserve.
