= Tylecodon aurusbergensis =

Conservation status
- Near Threatened (IUCN 3.1)

Scientific classification
- Kingdom: Plantae
- Clade: Tracheophytes
- Clade: Angiosperms
- Clade: Eudicots
- Order: Saxifragales
- Family: Crassulaceae
- Genus: Tylecodon
- Species: T. aurusbergensis

Binomial name
- Tylecodon aurusbergensis G.Will. & Van Jaarsv.

Species of succulent

Tylecodon aurusbergensis is a species of plant in the family Crassulaceae. It is endemic to Namibia. Its natural habitat is rocky areas. It is threatened by habitat loss.
