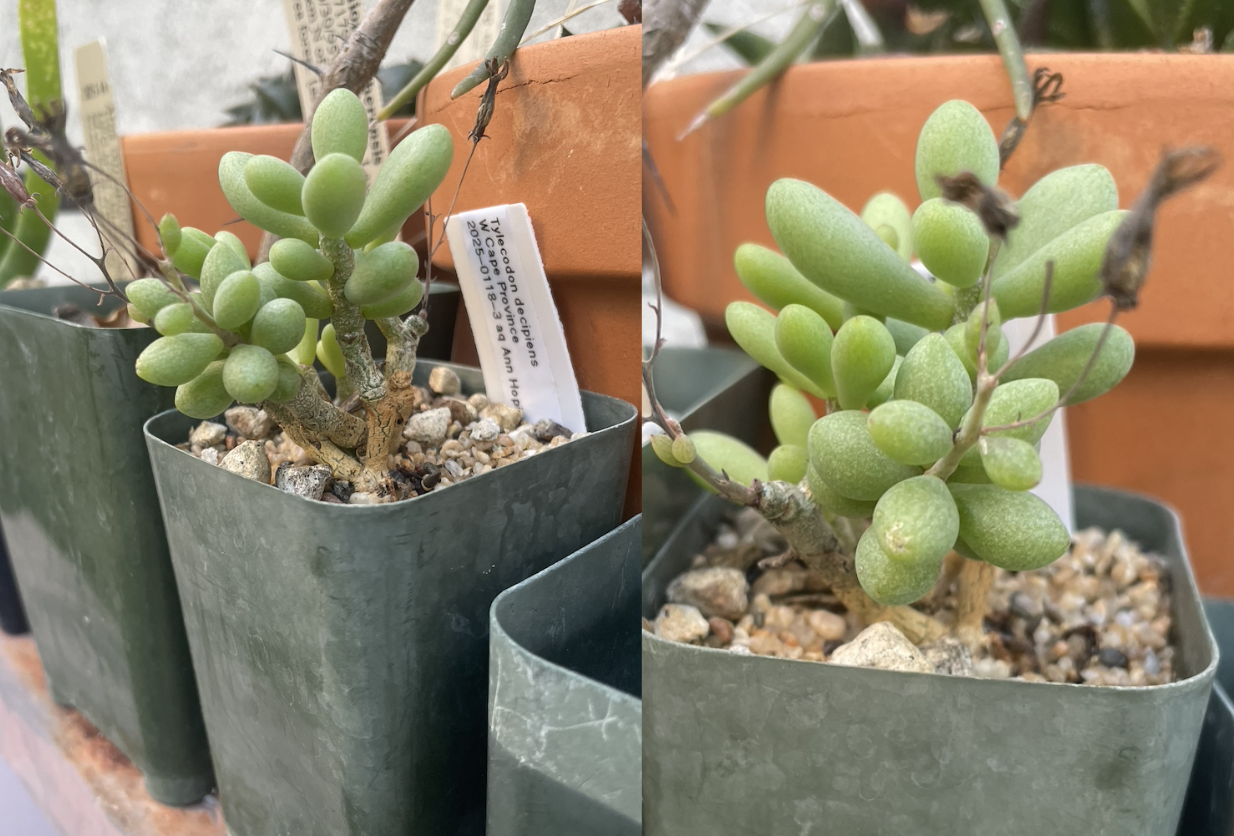

Scientific classification
- Kingdom: Plantae
- Clade: Tracheophytes
- Clade: Angiosperms
- Clade: Eudicots
- Order: Saxifragales
- Family: Crassulaceae
- Genus: Tylecodon
- Species: T. decipiens

Binomial name
- Tylecodon decipiens Toelken

= Tylecodon decipiens =

Species of plant

Tylecodon decipiens is a species of flowering plant in the family Crassulaceae native to South Africa.

== Description ==
This is a small species with leaves that are like jellybeans borne on multiple branches. When plants are older, they form a tuber. The flowers are tubular, but unlike most species of Tylecodon, T. decipiens has petals that are pink and are visible.
