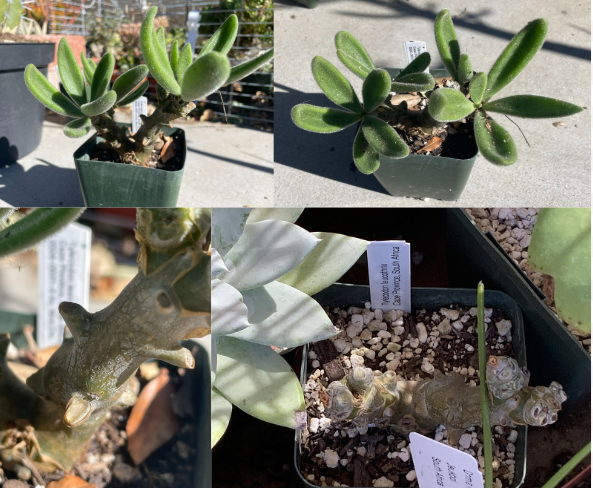

Scientific classification
- Kingdom: Plantae
- Clade: Tracheophytes
- Clade: Angiosperms
- Clade: Eudicots
- Order: Saxifragales
- Family: Crassulaceae
- Genus: Tylecodon
- Species: T. leucothrix

Binomial name
- Tylecodon leucothrix Cact. Succ. J. (Los Angeles) 79: 270 (2007)

= Tylecodon leucothrix =

Species of Aloe

Tylecodon leucothrix is a species of Tylecodon native to Eastern Little Karoo in South Africa. It was first described in Bothalia by Toelken in 1978.

== Flowers ==
Its flowers grow on a short stick, and are like many Tylecodon flowers. They have tubular flowers, usually white or pink, and the flowers have petals that bend outwards.

== Description of the plant ==
Tylecodon leucothrix is a caudiciform plant with fuzzy leaves. This plant goes dormant in the summer and has pentucles that are slightly sharp, likely to discourage herbivores.
