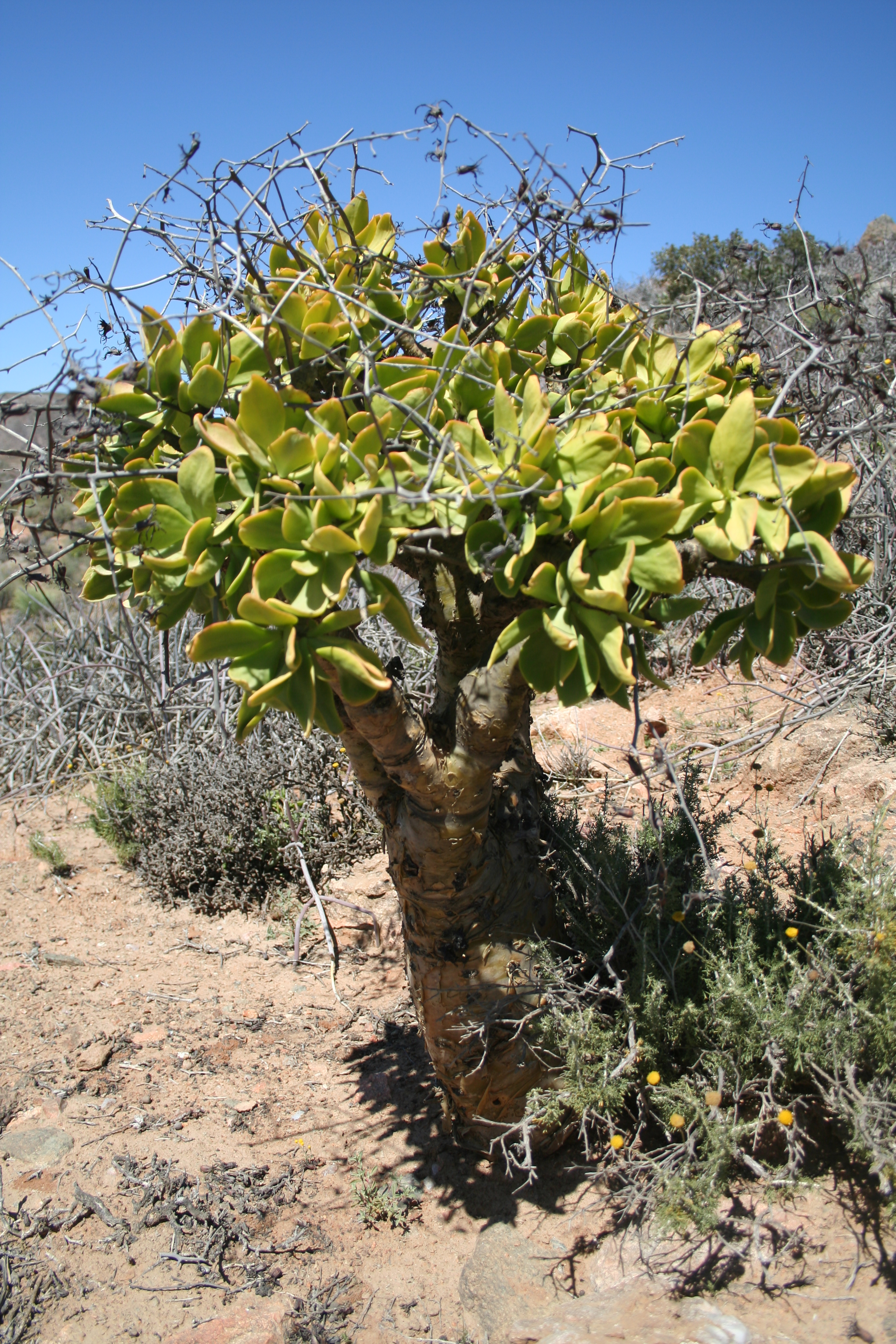
- Tylecodon paniculatus

Scientific classification
- Kingdom: Plantae
- Clade: Tracheophytes
- Clade: Angiosperms
- Clade: Eudicots
- Order: Saxifragales
- Family: Crassulaceae
- Subfamily: Kalanchoideae
- Genus: Tylecodon; Toelken

= Tylecodon =

Genus of flowering plants

Tylecodon is a genus of succulent plants in the family Crassulaceae, native to southern Africa.

Until the late 1970s all these plants were included in the genus Cotyledon, but in 1978 Helmut Toelken of the Botanical Research Institute, Pretoria, split them off into a genus of their own.

== Description and taxonomy ==
The grounds for splitting Cotyledon to create the new genus included certain features of the flowers, but more conspicuously, the leaves of Tylecodon are deciduous in summer and they are borne in a spiral arrangement, rather than the opposite, decussate arrangement of Cotyledon leaves.

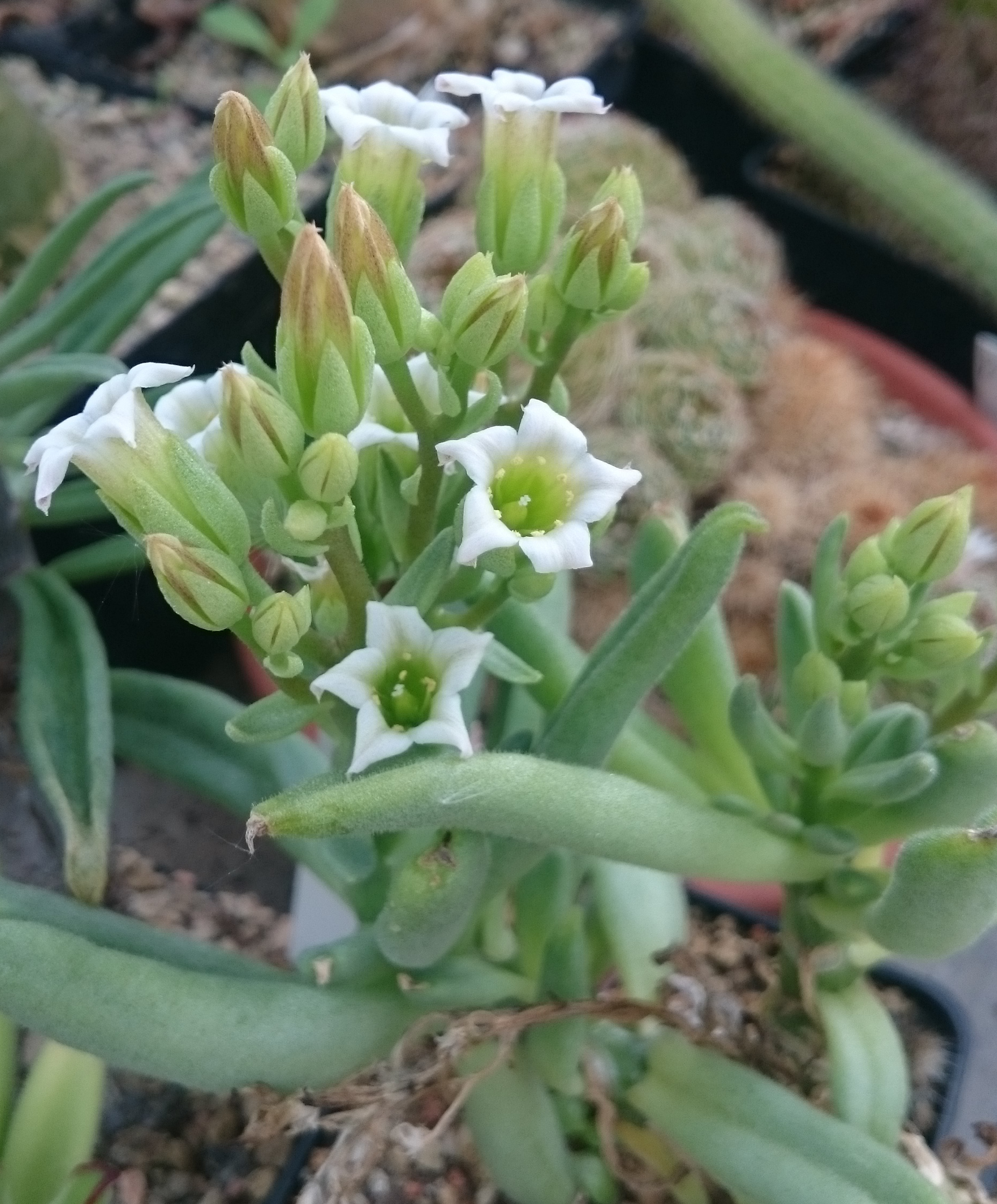
Detail of Tylecodon racemosus flowers

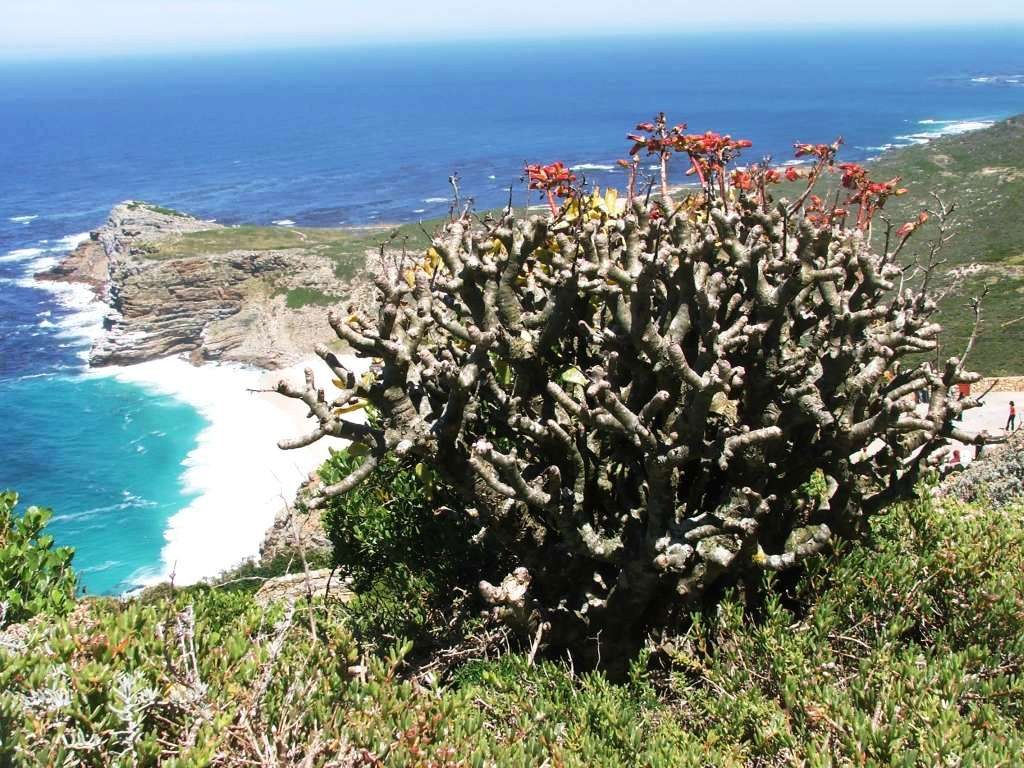
Tylecodon paniculatus in summer, without leaves

The species are very varied, ranging from dwarf succulents such as Tylecodon reticulatus to Tylecodon paniculatus, which may exceed two metres in height.

The new name Tylecodon was apparently chosen as a syllabic anagram of the earlier name Cotyledon.

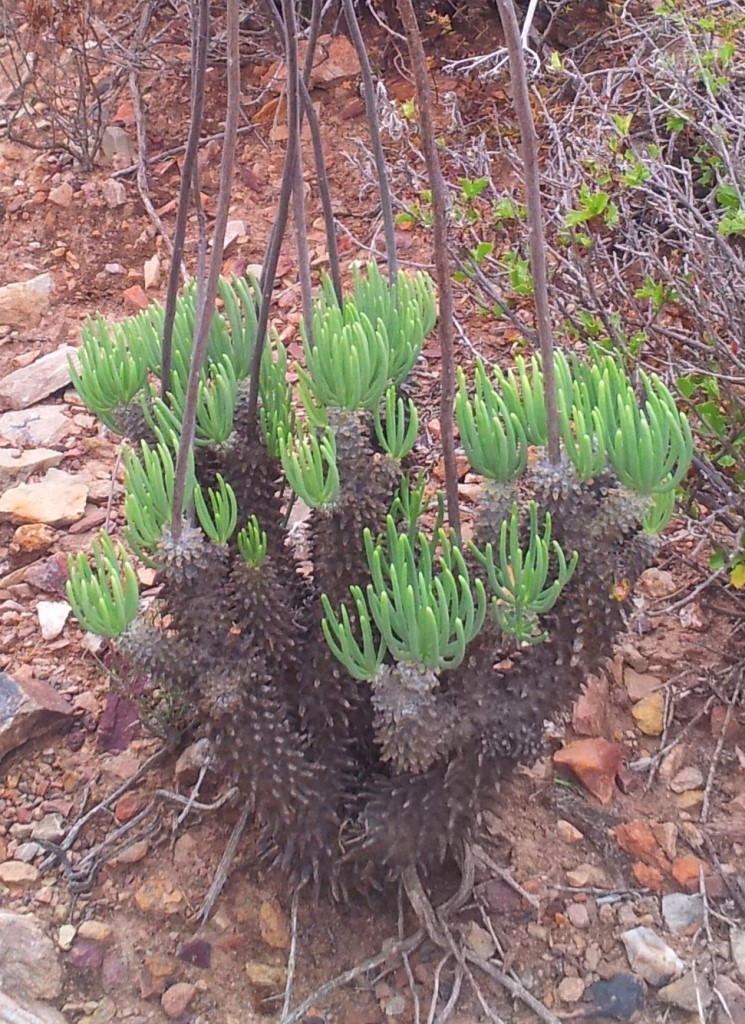
Tylecodon wallichii

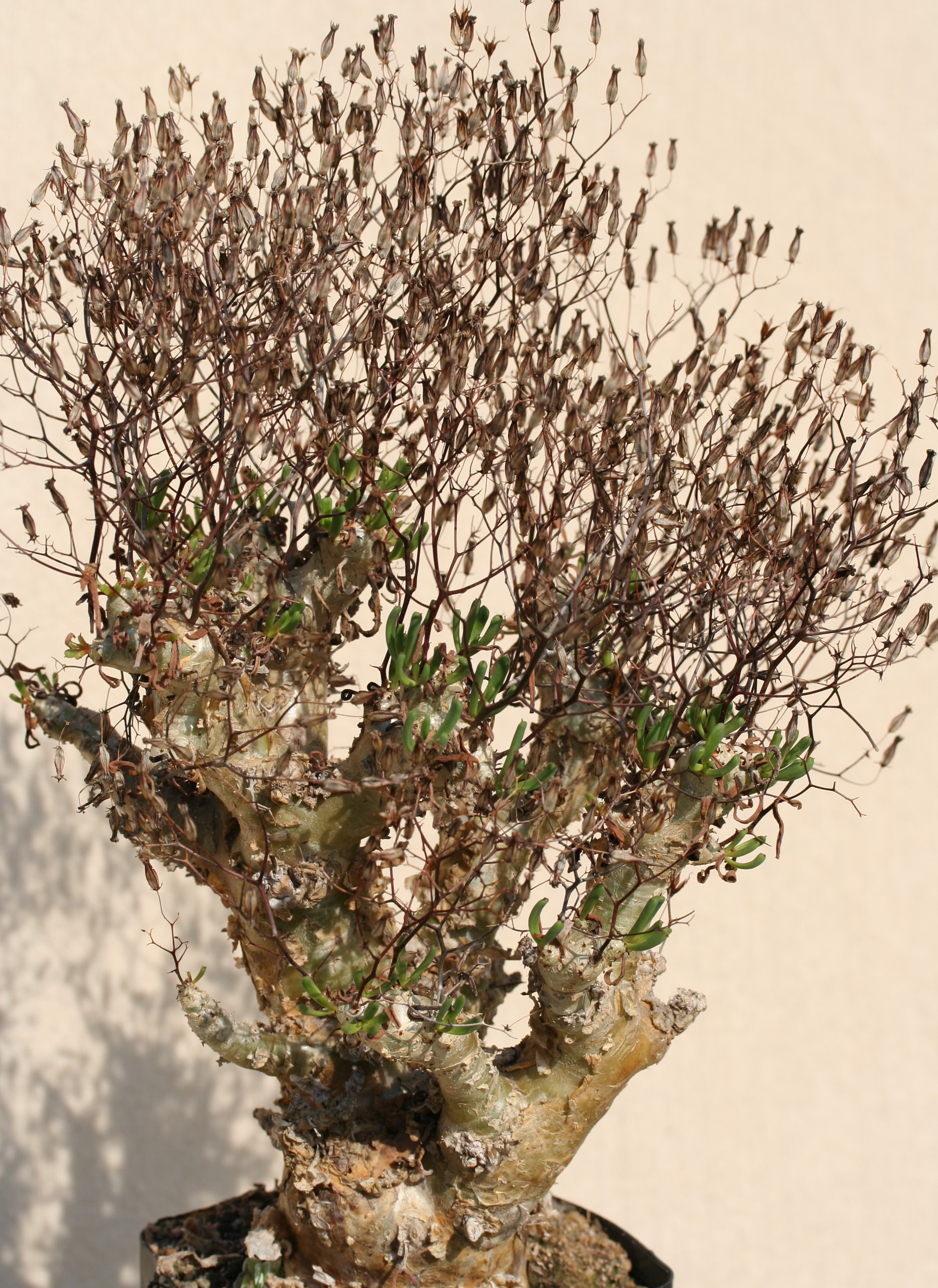
Tylecodon reticulatus

== Pharmacology and toxicology ==
Tylecodon species are poisonous. Some of them are sufficiently hazardous to livestock to constitute an economic problem for stock farmers. Concerns also have been expressed on potential risks to collectors who handle the plants carelessly. The various species and even individual plants do however vary greatly in toxicity.

The best-known active ingredients of Tylecodon species are bufadienolides biochemically related to toad venoms and bile acids. In some species more than half a dozen such compounds have been identified. As such they are nervous and muscle poisons that cause various cardiac symptoms. In livestock they cause various forms of the condition known as krimpsiekte, meaning "contraction" or "shrinking" disease. The meat of poisoned animals is dangerous to dogs or humans that eat it. However, it also is claimed that the meat is only dangerous to eat if it is raw or incompletely cooked, and that it may be eaten with relative safety if thoroughly cooked. If this is correct, it is not clear why cooking should have such an effect, and accordingly readers should be cautious in relying on such claims.

Pollinators such as honey bees visit the plants avidly during the flowering season, without recorded ill effects from the nectar or pollen.

== Status ==
Currently the IUCN Red List lists only two species of Tylecodon as "near threatened" (NT), namely Tylecodon aridimontanus and Tylecodon aurusbergensis. However, stock deaths have prompted farmers to treat the plants as weeds, to the extent that fears have been expressed for the future of some species.

== Cultivation ==
Some species of Tylecodon are attractive or intriguing enough to be popular among succulent collectors. However, novices have been advised to take precautions against poisoning. For example, some experienced horticulturists wear gloves when handling the plants. Most species are easy to grow in well-drained soil in hot conditions in full sunlight, very sparingly watered, as is commonly recommended for succulents from arid regions.

== Species ==
The genus Tylecodon includes the following species, but this list certainly is incomplete. For one thing, it does not contain any mention of subspecies, hybrids and the like. Also, inevitably, new species are described occasionally.

- Tylecodon albiflorus Bruyns
- Tylecodon aridimontanus, G. Will.
- Tylecodon atropurpureus Bruyns
- Tylecodon aurusbergensis, G. Will. & Van Jaarsv.
- Tylecodon bayeri E. J. Van Jaarsveld
- Tylecodon buchholzianus (Schuldt & Stephens) Tölken FP 45: 1774.
- Tylecodon cacaliodes (L. f.) Tölken FP 7: 249.
- Tylecodon cacaliodes (L. f.) Tölken x T. paniculatus (L. f.) Tölken
- Tylecodon decipiens Tölken
- Tylecodon ellaphieae E. J. Van Jaarsveld FP 50: 1983.
- Tylecodon faucium (V. Pölln.) Tölken
- Tylecodon fragilis (R. A. Dyer) Tölken FP 41: 1631.
- Tylecodon grandiflorus (Burm. f.) Tölken FP 27: 1046.
- Tylecodon hallii (Tölken) Tölken
- Tylecodon hirtifolius (W. f. Barker) Tölken FP 18: 690.
- Tylecodon kritzingeri E. J. Van Jaarsveld FP 51: 2006.
- Tylecodon leucothrix (C. A. Sm.) Tölken
- Tylecodon occultans (Tölken) Tölken
- Tylecodon paniculatus (L. f.) Tölken FP 29: 1142.
- Tylecodon pearsonii (Schonl.) Tölken
- Tylecodon pusillus Bruyns
- Tylecodon pygmaeus (W. f. Barker) Tölken FP 10: 396.
- Tylecodon racemosus (Harv.) Tölken FP 22: 848.
- Tylecodon reticulatus (L. f.) Tölken
- Tylecodon rubrovenosus (Dinter) Tölken
- Tylecodon schaeferianus (Dinter) Tölken FP 10: 394
- Tylecodon similis (Tölken) Tölken
- Tylecodon singularis (R. A. Dyer) Tölken FP 41: 1606.
- Tylecodon stenocaulis Bruyns
- Tylecodon striatus (P. C. Hutch.) Tölken
- Tylecodon suffultus Bruyns ex Tölken var. suffultus.
- Tylecodon sulphurous (Tölken) Tölken
- Tylecodon tenuis (Tölken) Tölken
- Tylecodon tomosus Tölken
- Tylecodon tuberosus Tölken
- Tylecodon ventricosus (Burm. f.) Tölken
- Tylecodon viridiflorus (Tölken) Tölken FP 48: 1919.
- Tylecodon wallichii (Harv.) Tölken subsp. wallichii

== Bibliography ==
- Tölken, H. (15 December 1978). "New taxa and new combinations in Cotyledon and allied genera". Bothalia. 12 (3): 377–393. doi:10.4102/abc.v12i3.1794.
- Mort, Mark E.; Levsen, Nicholas; Randle, Christopher P.; Van Jaarsveld, Ernst; Palmer, Annie (July 2005). "Phylogenetics and diversification of Cotyledon (Crassulaceae) inferred from nuclear and chloroplast DNA sequence data". American Journal of Botany. 92 (7): 1170–1176. doi:10.3732/ajb.92.7.1170. PMID 21646139.
