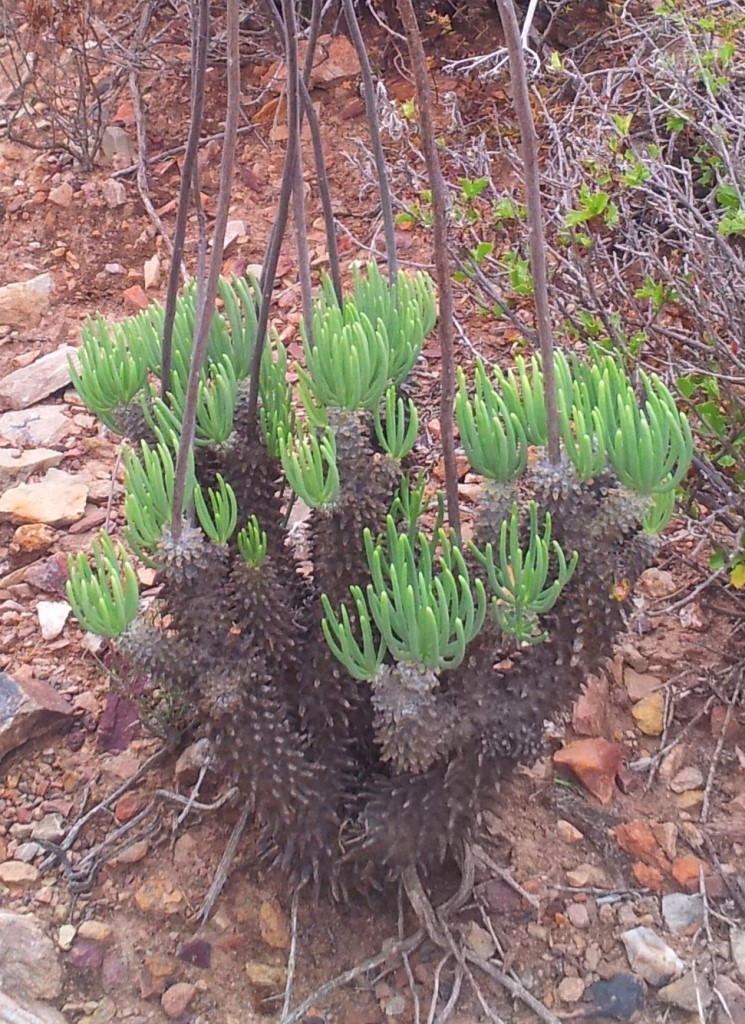
- Tylecodon wallichii in Montagu.

Scientific classification
- Kingdom: Plantae
- Clade: Tracheophytes
- Clade: Angiosperms
- Clade: Eudicots
- Order: Saxifragales
- Family: Crassulaceae
- Genus: Tylecodon
- Species: T. wallichii

Binomial name
- Tylecodon wallichii (Harv.) Toelken

Synonyms
- Cotyledon wallichii Harv.; Tylecodon papillaris subsp. wallichii (Harv.) G.D.Rowley

= Tylecodon wallichii =

Species of succulent

Tylecodon wallichii is a species of succulent plant in the genus Tylecodon belonging to the family Crassulaceae. The species is named in honour of Nathaniel Wallich, early 19th century Danish plant hunter, botanist and physician.

== Description ==
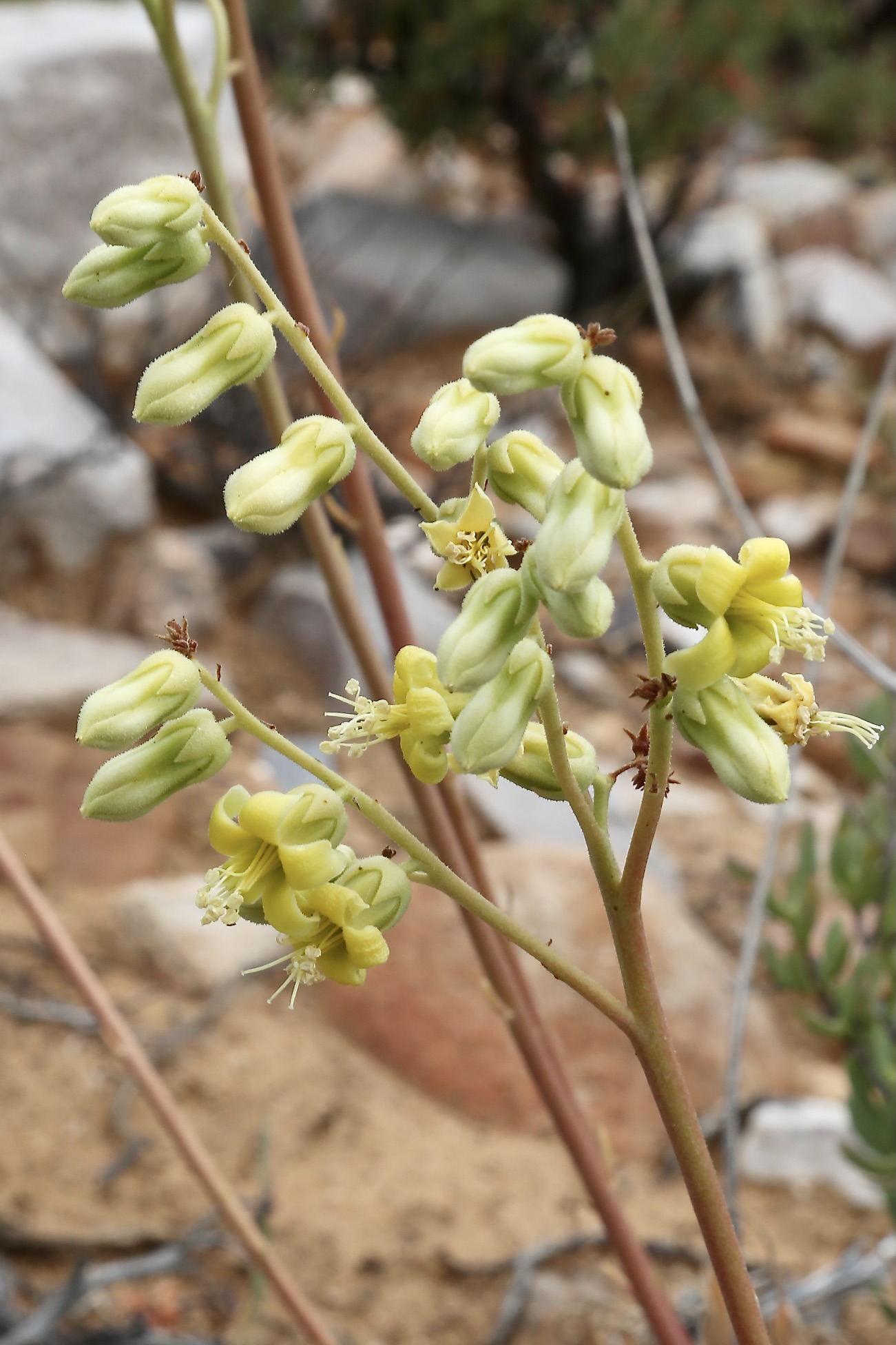
Detail of Tylecodon wallichii flowers. Anysberg Nature Reserve.

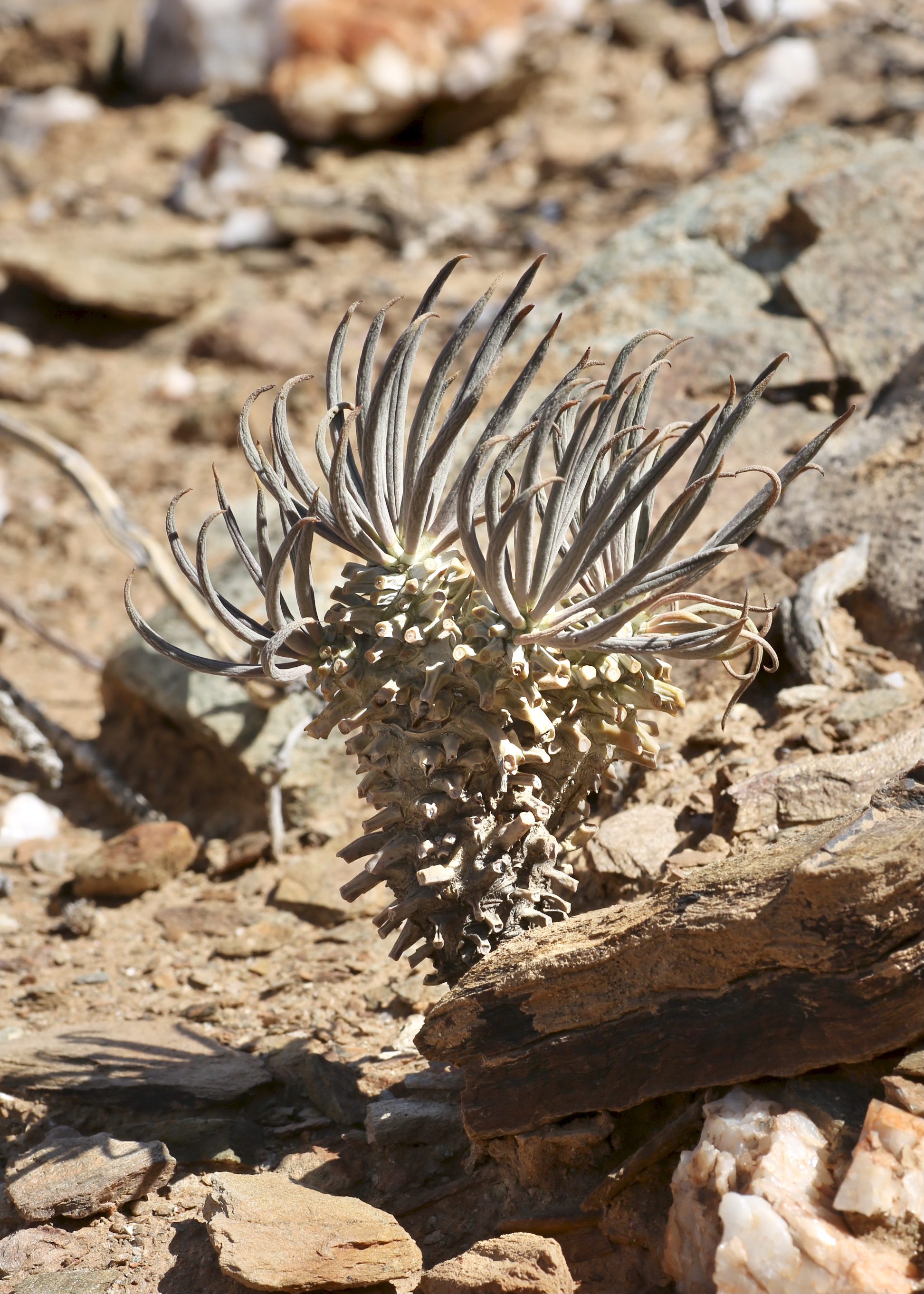
Tylecodon wallichii in winter. Richtersveld National Park

Tylecodon wallichii is a low sparsely branched shrublet reaching a height of about 50 cm (up to 1 m) with a single thick succulent stem up to 6 cm in diameter. Greyish branches are densely covered with residual leaf bases (phyllopodia) up to 1.5 cm long and crowded leaves on their tips. Leaves are yellowish to ash-green, hairless, ascending, slightly curved inward, tapering towards the apex, with a shallow groove along upper side, 6.5 — 9.5 cm (up to 15 cm) long. Plants blossom during summer, producing spreading to pendent clusters of dangling yellowish-green, urn-shaped flowers of 7-12 mm long with spreading to recurved lobes.

It hybridises with Tylecodon paniculatus.

== Distribution ==
Gravelly or sandy slopes of South Namibia and RCA from Namaqualand into the Great and Little Karoo.

== Toxicity ==
The plant contains bufadienolide-type cardiac glycoside cotyledoside which causes nenta poisoning ("krimpsiekte") in livestock.

== Subspecies ==
- Tylecodon wallichii subsp. wallichii — South Namibia, RCA (Northern Cape)
- Tylecodon wallichii subsp. ecklonianus (Harv.) Toelken — South Namibia, RCA (Northern and Western Cape)
