= Tylecodon aridimontanus =

Conservation status
- Near Threatened (IUCN 3.1)

Scientific classification
- Kingdom: Plantae
- Clade: Tracheophytes
- Clade: Angiosperms
- Clade: Eudicots
- Order: Saxifragales
- Family: Crassulaceae
- Genus: Tylecodon
- Species: T. aridimontanus

Binomial name
- Tylecodon aridimontanus G.Will.

Species of succulent

Tylecodon aridimontanus is a species of plant in the family Crassulaceae. It is endemic to Namibia. Its natural habitat is rocky areas. It is threatened by habitat loss.
