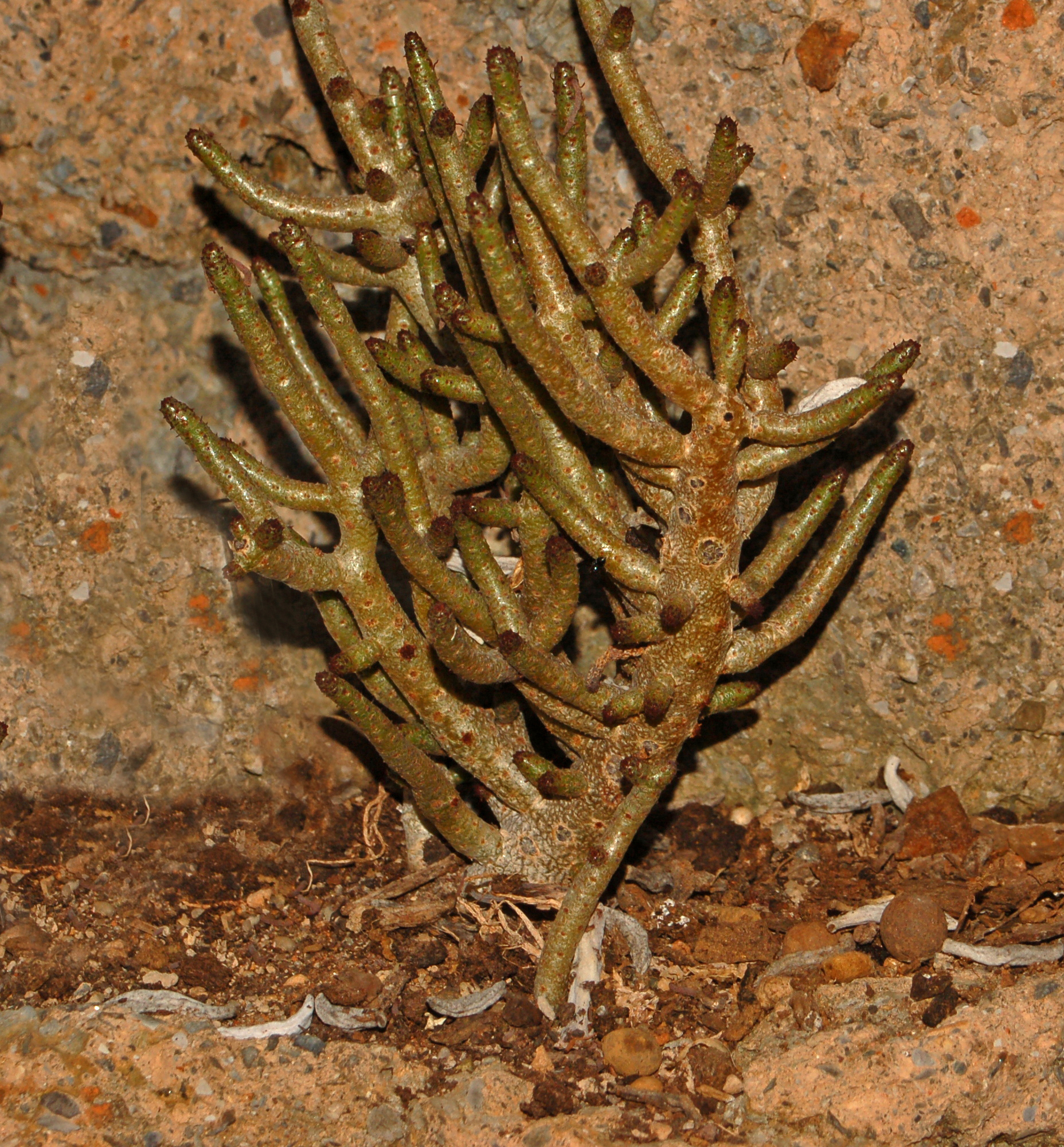
- Tylecodon buchholzianus at the botanical garden of Villa Durazzo-Pallavicini, Genova Pegli

Scientific classification
- Kingdom: Plantae
- Clade: Tracheophytes
- Clade: Angiosperms
- Clade: Eudicots
- Order: Saxifragales
- Family: Crassulaceae
- Genus: Tylecodon
- Species: T. buchholzianus

Binomial name
- Tylecodon buchholzianus (Schuldt & P.Stephan) Toelken

Synonyms
- Cotyledon bucholziana Schuldt & Stephan 1938

= Tylecodon buchholzianus =

Species of succulent

Tylecodon buchholzianus is a species of succulent plant in the genus Tylecodon belonging to the family Crassulaceae.

== Description ==
Tylecodon buchholzianus is a shrub reaching a height of about 20–30 cm. It is a winter slow-growing plant, dormant during the summer. The stem is a swollen and thickened caudex with a diameter up to 30 cm and many elongate whitish or grey branches. In the Spring arise almost cylindrical green leaves, about 10 cm long, but the photosynthesis may be granted also by microscopic leaflets on the stem. Flowers are pale pink, have recurved lobes and emerge from tubes on short petioles. Flowering period extends from January to late Spring.

== Distribution ==
This species is native to Namaqualand in South Africa and Namibia.

== Subspecies ==
- Tylecodon buchholzianus var. buchholzianus
- Tylecodon buchholzianus var. fasciculatus
