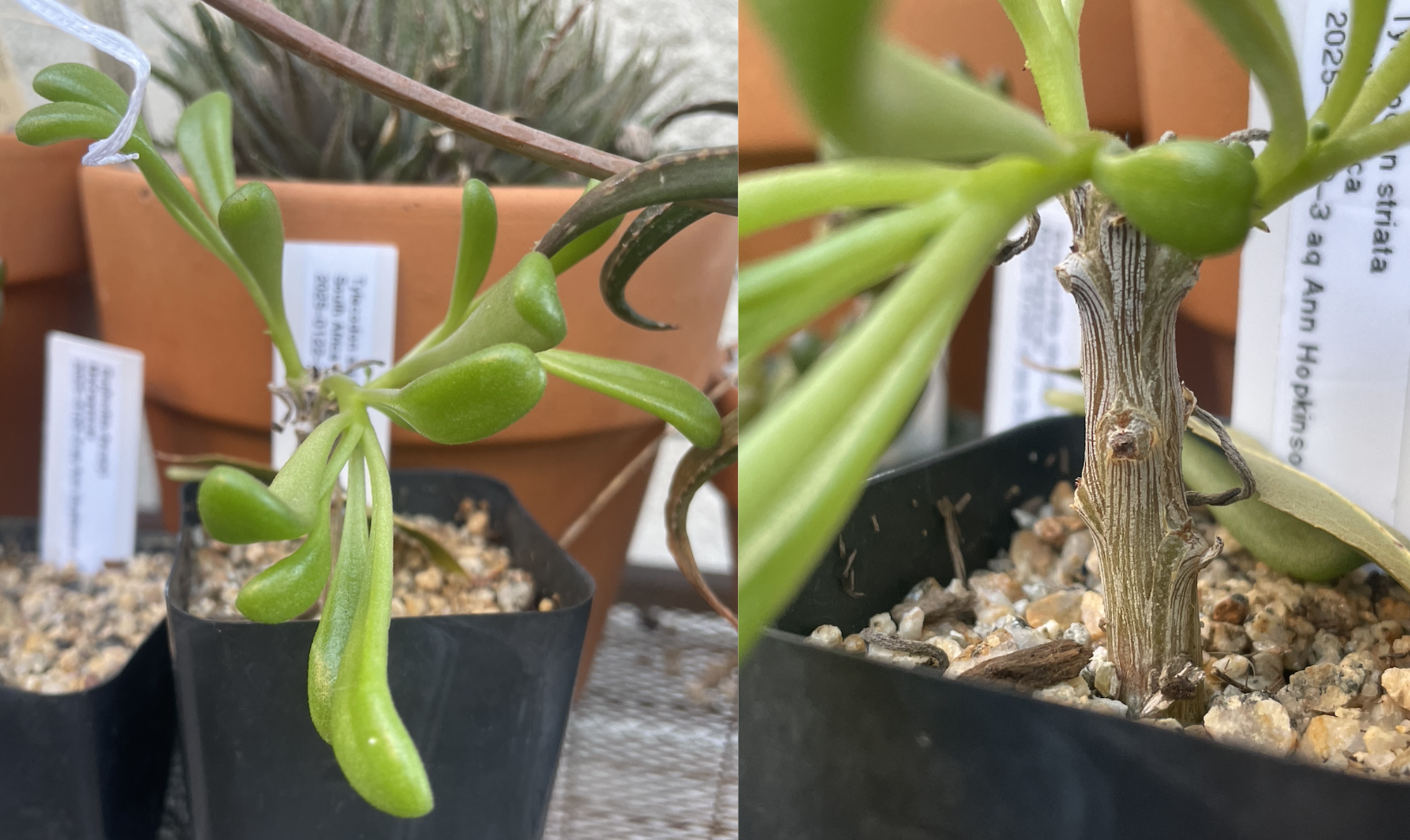

Scientific classification
- Kingdom: Plantae
- Clade: Tracheophytes
- Clade: Angiosperms
- Clade: Eudicots
- Order: Saxifragales
- Family: Crassulaceae
- Genus: Tylecodon
- Species: T. striatus

Binomial name
- Tylecodon striatus (Hutchison) Toelken

= Tylecodon striatus =

Species of plant

Tylecodon striatus is a species of Tylecodon native to South Africa Cape Provinces

== Description ==
This is a shrubby plant that grows to about 10 inches tall. The leaves are linear, with small grooves likely used to direct water to its roots, and are rarely flat but usually curve. They also grow an irregular shaped tuber. The stems will grow patterns on its stem.

== Flower description ==
The flowers are tubular like most Tylecodon flowers. They are yellow greenish on this plant.
