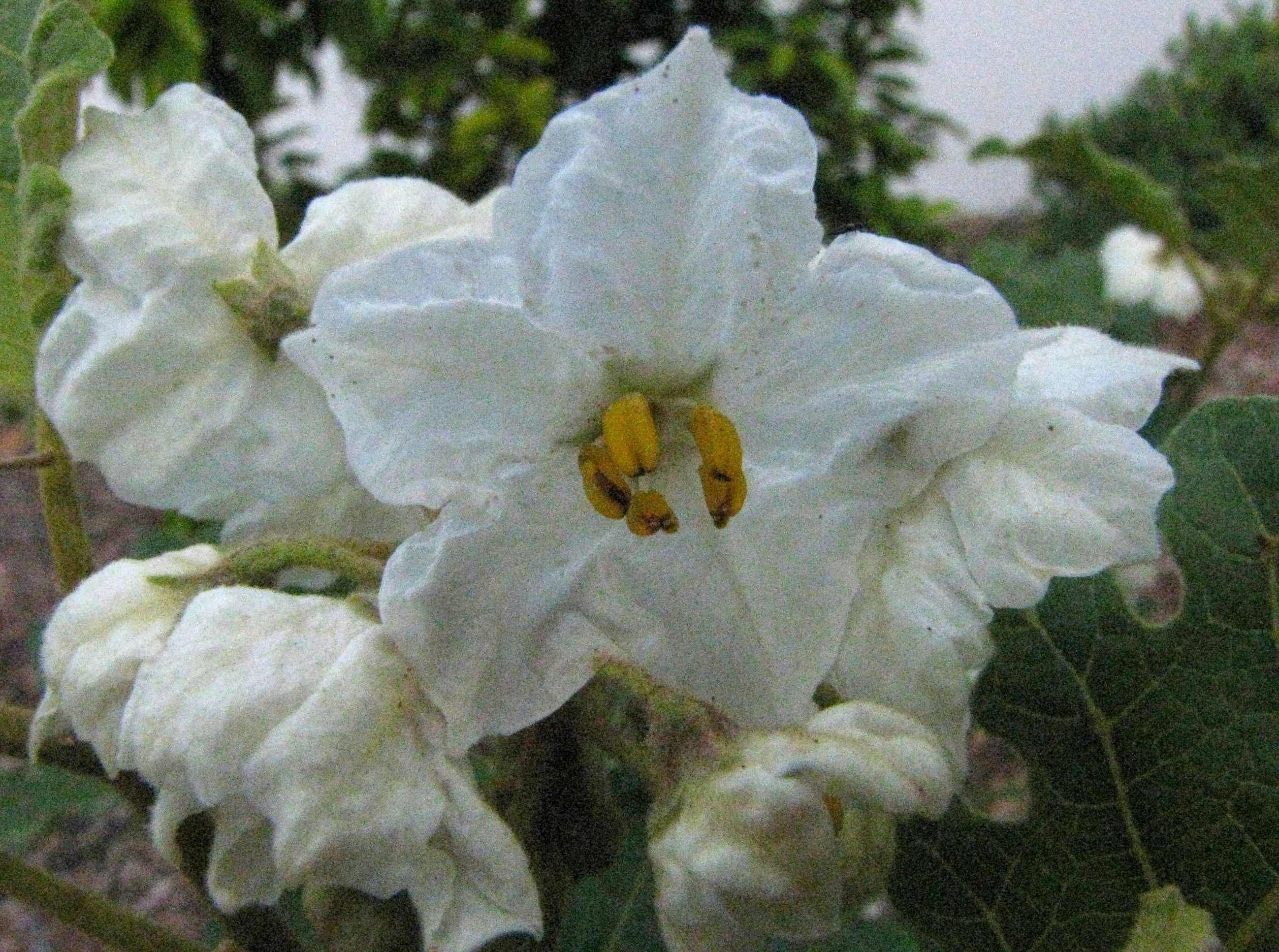

Conservation status
- Critically Endangered (IUCN 3.1)

- Critically Imperiled (NatureServe)

Scientific classification
- Kingdom: Plantae
- Clade: Tracheophytes
- Clade: Angiosperms
- Clade: Eudicots
- Clade: Asterids
- Order: Solanales
- Family: Solanaceae
- Genus: Solanum
- Species: S. incompletum

Binomial name
- Solanum incompletum Dunal

= Solanum incompletum =

Species of flowering plant

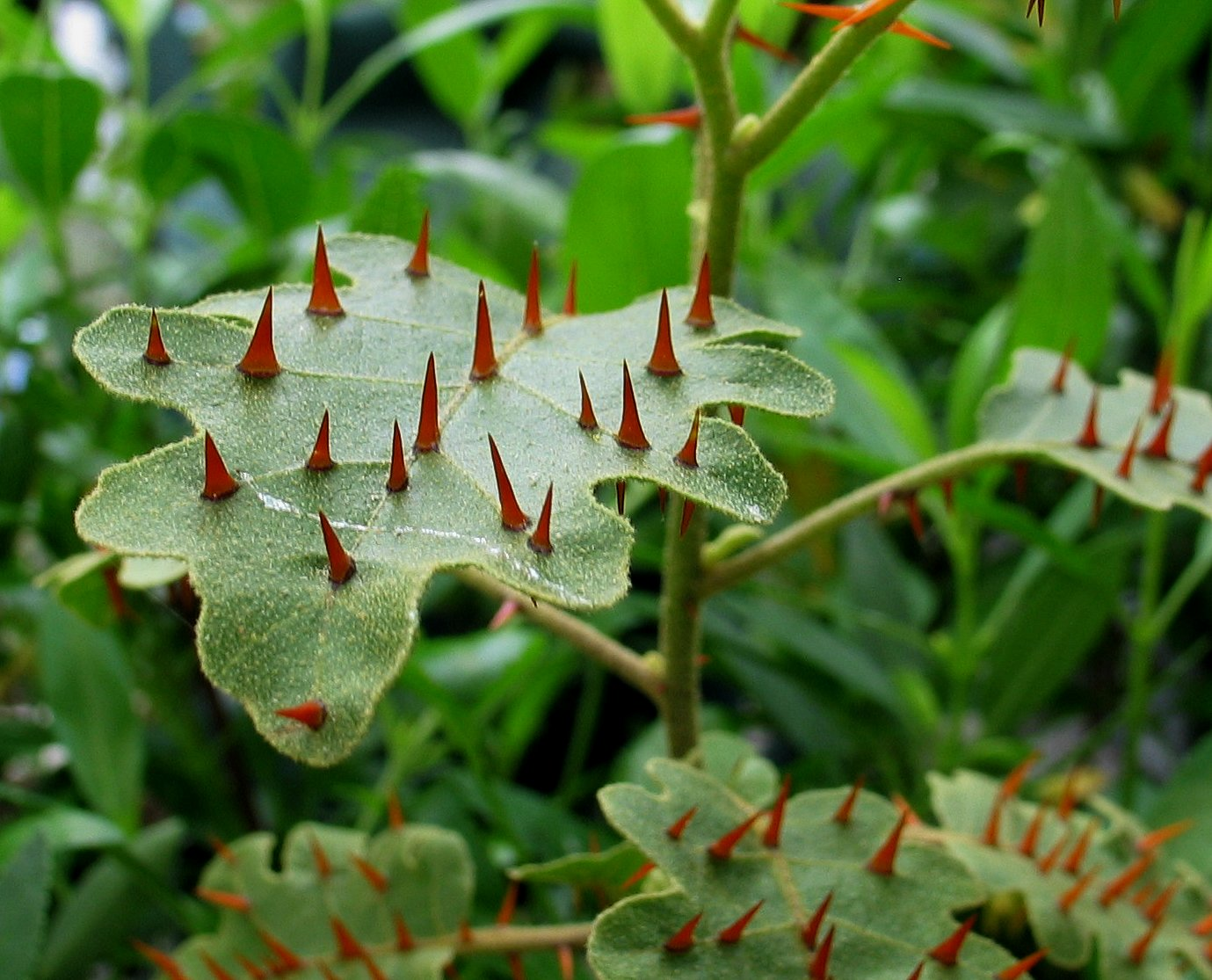
Leaf with red thorns

Solanum incompletum is a rare species of flowering plant in the family Solanaceae known by the common names thorny popolo and popolo ku mai (popolo being a term for any Solanum species and similar berry-bearing plants). It is endemic to Hawaii, where it occurs today on the islands of Maui, Lanai, and Hawaii. It is threatened by the destruction and degradation of its habitat. It is a federally listed endangered species of the United States. The plant is threatened by feral ungulates such as feral pigs, feral goats, and mouflon. The invasion of introduced species of plants such as Pennisetum setaceum (fountain grass) and Kalanchoe tubiflora (chandelier plant) degrades the habitat. The conservation status of this species from the International Union of Conservation of Nature (IUCN) and Hawaiʻi Natural Heritage Ranking has been listed as critically endangered. The species was once considered extinct but six plants were discovered on the Island of Hawaiʻi, moving it to endangered status. Conservation efforts should include plant monitoring for pests and disease, detailed surveys, and, if possible, collection of plant material to propagate and reestablish populations.

== Description ==
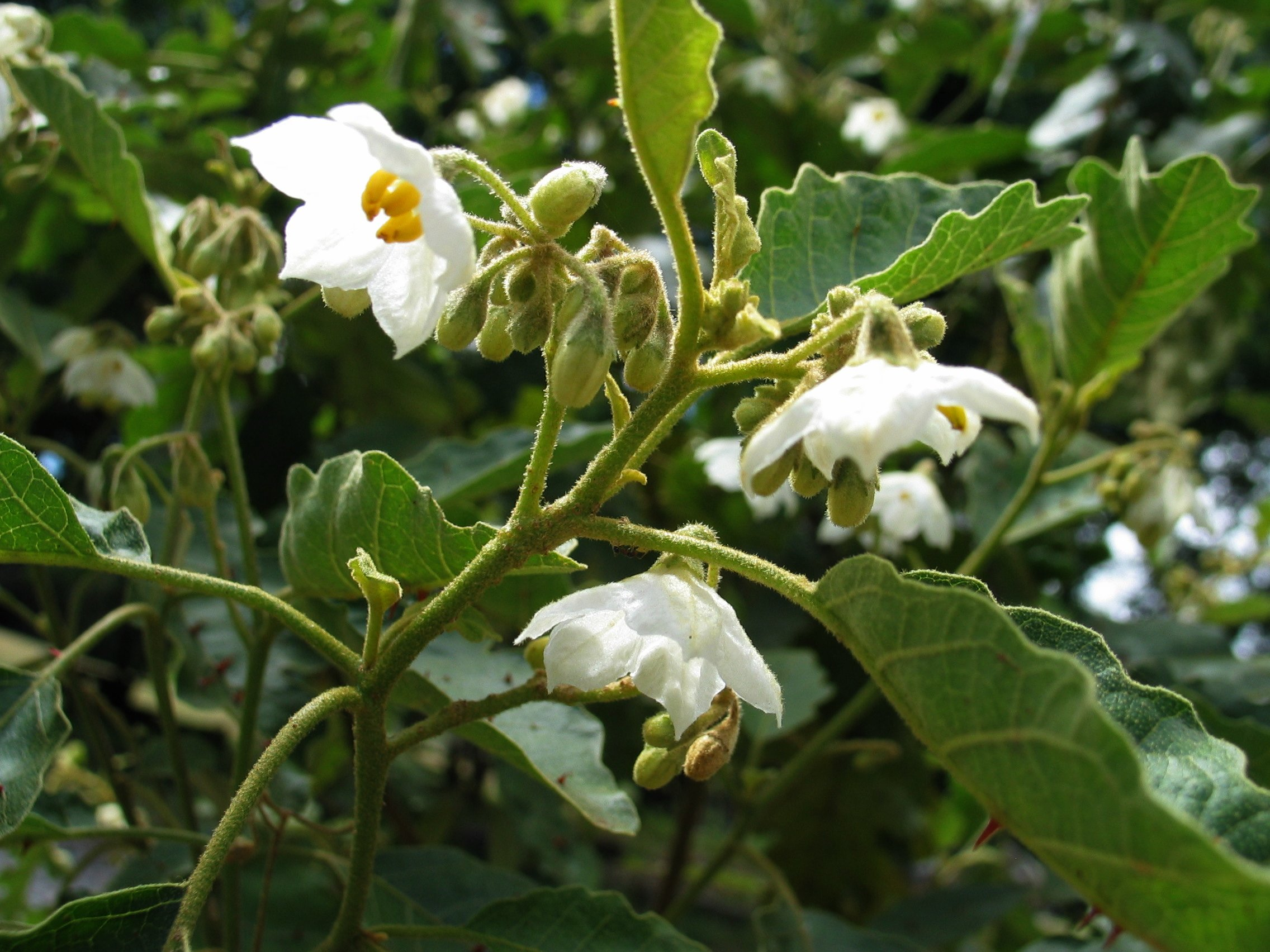
White flowers

This plant is a shrub growing up to 3 m (9.8 ft) tall. Its stems and leaves are covered in large red thorns, and it bears star-shaped white flowers. The plant grows in forest and shrubland habitat, and cinder cone habitat on Hawaiʻi. The plant species has a fibrous root system and its leaves are of an oval shape that measures between 10–15 cm (4–6 in) in length and around 7–8 cm (2.8–3.1 in) in width. Its leaves are simple with an alternate arrangement and a shape of ovate-elliptic. The flowers are bisexual/perfect meaning they have both female and male reproductive parts; they do not have prickles and along with the flowers being white and star shaped, the flowers measure at about 2 cm (0.8 in) in diameter. The flowers grow on the plant in loose branching clusters having each flower that grows on a stalk to be measured at about 9 mm (0.35 in) in length. The fruit of the plant goes from an unripe yellow to a ripped orange and even black berry that varies in size but is generally around 15–18 mm (0.6–0.7 in) in diameter.

== Distribution and habitat ==
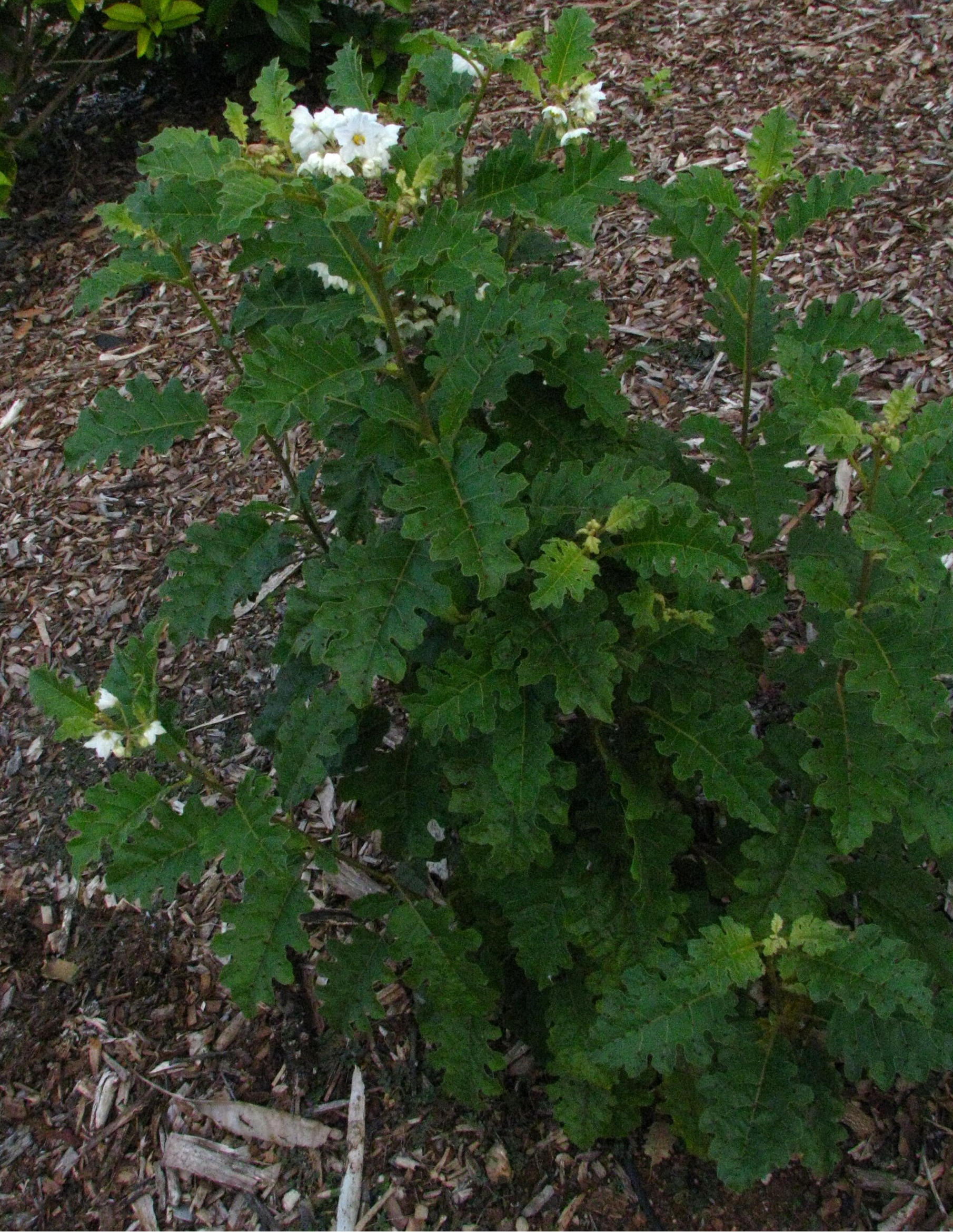
full plant view

The species is extirpated from the islands of Kaua'i and Moloka'i. It was feared extirpated from Hawaiʻi until a small population was discovered there in recent years. Now there are 83 individuals estimated on that island. Several have been outplanted into appropriate habitat. The plants also appear to have trouble reproducing, as evidenced by low seed production, perhaps due to extinction of their preferred pollinators. Many areas of the Hawaiian Islands are prone to wildfires, which endangers the species. The thorny Popolo flourishes in dry and mesic forest/diverse mesic forest area along with subalpine forest area and within ridges and gulches. On the Island of Hawaiʻi it is also found on cinder cones and older lava flows. It does well in elevation between 600–2,260 m (1,970–7,410 ft). This plant species is a short-lived perennial member of the nightshade family.
