= Quercus frutex =

Conservation status
- Least Concern (IUCN 3.1)

Scientific classification
- Kingdom: Plantae
- Clade: Embryophytes
- Clade: Tracheophytes
- Clade: Spermatophytes
- Clade: Angiosperms
- Clade: Eudicots
- Clade: Rosids
- Order: Fagales
- Family: Fagaceae
- Genus: Quercus
- Subgenus: Quercus subg. Quercus
- Section: Quercus sect. Quercus
- Species: Q. frutex

Binomial name
- Quercus frutex Trel.

Species of oak tree

Quercus frutex is a species of flowering plant in the family Fagaceae. It is endemic to central Mexico, found in México State, D.F., Tlaxcala, Hidalgo, Jalisco, Puebla, and Oaxaca. It is placed in Quercus section Quercus.

Quercus frutex is a shrub growing up to 2.5 metres (8 feet) tall (very rarely attaining tree stature at 7 meters in height), spreading by means of underground rhizomes and thus forming sizable clonal colonies. The bark is dark gray. The leaves are oblong, with no teeth or with a few shallow teeth.
