= Clonal colony =

Genetically identical, single site plants, fungi, or bacteria

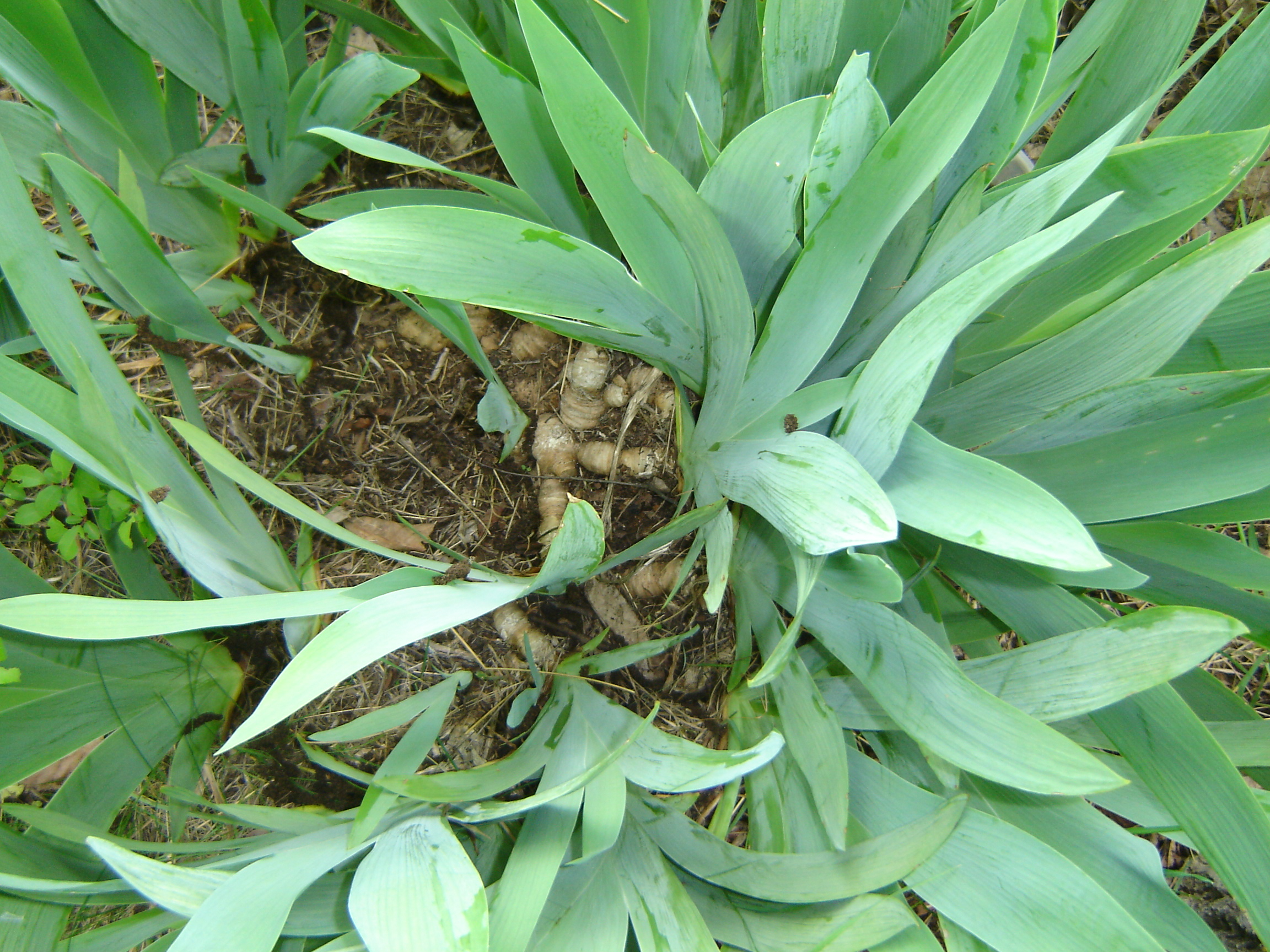
A clonal colony of Iris germanica—note the rhizomatous stems by which the plant reproduces.

A clonal colony or genet is a group of genetically identical individuals, such as plants, fungi, or bacteria, that have grown in a given location, all originating vegetatively, not sexually, from a single ancestor. In plants, an individual in such a population is referred to as a ramet. In fungi, "individuals" typically refers to the visible fruiting bodies or mushrooms that develop from a common mycelium which, although spread over a large area, is otherwise hidden in the soil. Clonal colonies are common in many plant species. Although many plants reproduce sexually through the production of seed, reproduction occurs by underground stolons or rhizomes in some plants. Above ground, these plants most often appear to be distinct individuals, but underground they remain interconnected and are all clones of the same plant. However, it is not always easy to recognize a clonal colony especially if it spreads underground and is also sexually reproducing.

== Methods of establishment ==
With most woody plants, clonal colonies arise by wide-ranging roots that at intervals send up new shoots, termed suckers. Trees and shrubs with branches that may tend to bend and rest on the ground, or which possess the ability to form aerial roots can form colonies via layering, or aerial rooting, e.g. willow, blackberry, fig, and banyan. Some vines naturally form adventitious roots on their stems that take root in the soil when the stems contact the ground, e.g. ivy and trumpet vine. With other vines, rooting of the stem where nodes come into contact with soil may establish a clonal colony, e.g. Wisteria. Ferns and many herbaceous flowering plants often form clonal colonies via horizontal underground stems termed rhizomes, e.g. ostrich fern Matteuccia struthiopteris and goldenrod. A number of herbaceous flowering plants form clonal colonies via horizontal surface stems termed stolons, or runners; e.g. strawberry and many grasses. Non-woody plants with underground storage organs such as bulbs and corms can also form colonies, e.g. Narcissus and Crocus. A few plant species can form colonies via adventitious plantlets that form on leaves, e.g. Kalanchoe daigremontiana and Tolmiea menziesii. A few plant species can form colonies via asexual seeds, termed apomixis, e.g. dandelion.

== Record colonies ==
One of only two known natural examples of King's Lomatia (Lomatia tasmanica) found growing in the wild is a clonal colony in Tasmania estimated to be 43,600 years old.

A group of 47,000 Quaking Aspen (Populus tremuloides) trees (nicknamed "Pando") in the Wasatch Mountains, Utah, United States, has been shown to be a single clone connected by the root system. It is sometimes considered the world's largest organism by mass, covering 106 acres (43 ha), and also as among the world's oldest living organisms, at an estimated 14,000 years old.

Another possible candidate for oldest organism on earth is an underwater meadow of the marine plant Posidonia oceanica in the Mediterranean Sea, which could be up to 100,000 years of age.

== Examples ==
When woody plants form clonal colonies, they often remain connected through the root system, sharing roots, water and mineral nutrients. A few non-vining, woody plants that form clonal colonies are Bigelow oak (Quercus sinuata var. breviloba), quaking aspen (Populus tremuloides), bayberry (Myrica pensylvanica), black locust (Robinia pseudoacacia), creosote bush (Larrea tridentata), bladdernut, blueberry (Vaccinium), devil's club (Oplopanax horridus), forsythia, hazelnut (Corylus), honey locust (Gleditsia triacanthos), Kentucky coffeetree (Gymnocladus dioicus), kerria (Kerria japonica), pawpaw (Asimina triloba), poplars (Populus), sassafras (Sassafras albidum), sumac (Rhus), sweetgum (Liquidambar styraciflua), and sweetshrub (Calycanthus floridus).

Hill cane, a species of low-growing bamboo native to the Appalachian mountains, appears to reproduce mainly by clonal colony growth and fragmentation, with limited or no sexual reproduction. In contrast to other Arundinaria species, which flower over various intervals of time, there are no recorded instances of hill cane plants flowering and setting seed. An eight-year study of hill cane stands on the Cumberland Plateau noted that most observed stands consisted of only one clonal genotype, with rhizome networks growing slowly and occasionally fragmenting. The largest recorded network covered thirty acres of land and was estimated to be approximately 1700 years old. As sexual reproduction is known in related Arundinaria species, the study speculated that hill cane may have lost this ability in relatively recent time and to be now relying on clonal spread.

== See also ==
- King Clone
- Tumour heterogeneity
