= Sexualist =

Sexualist may refer to:

- Believers in the occurrence of sexual reproduction in plants, particularly in early modern contexts
- People suffering from nymphomania
- People advocating free love
- People enjoying sexual reproduction in humans more generally
