= List of plants known as mother of thousands =

Mother of thousands is a common name for several plants, including:

- Cymbalaria muralis
- Kalanchoe daigremontiana
- Kalanchoe laetivirens
- Kalanchoe × houghtonii
- Saxifraga stolonifera
- Soleirolia soleirolii

== See also ==
- Mother of millions, Kalanchoe delagoensis, formerly Bryophyllum delagoense
