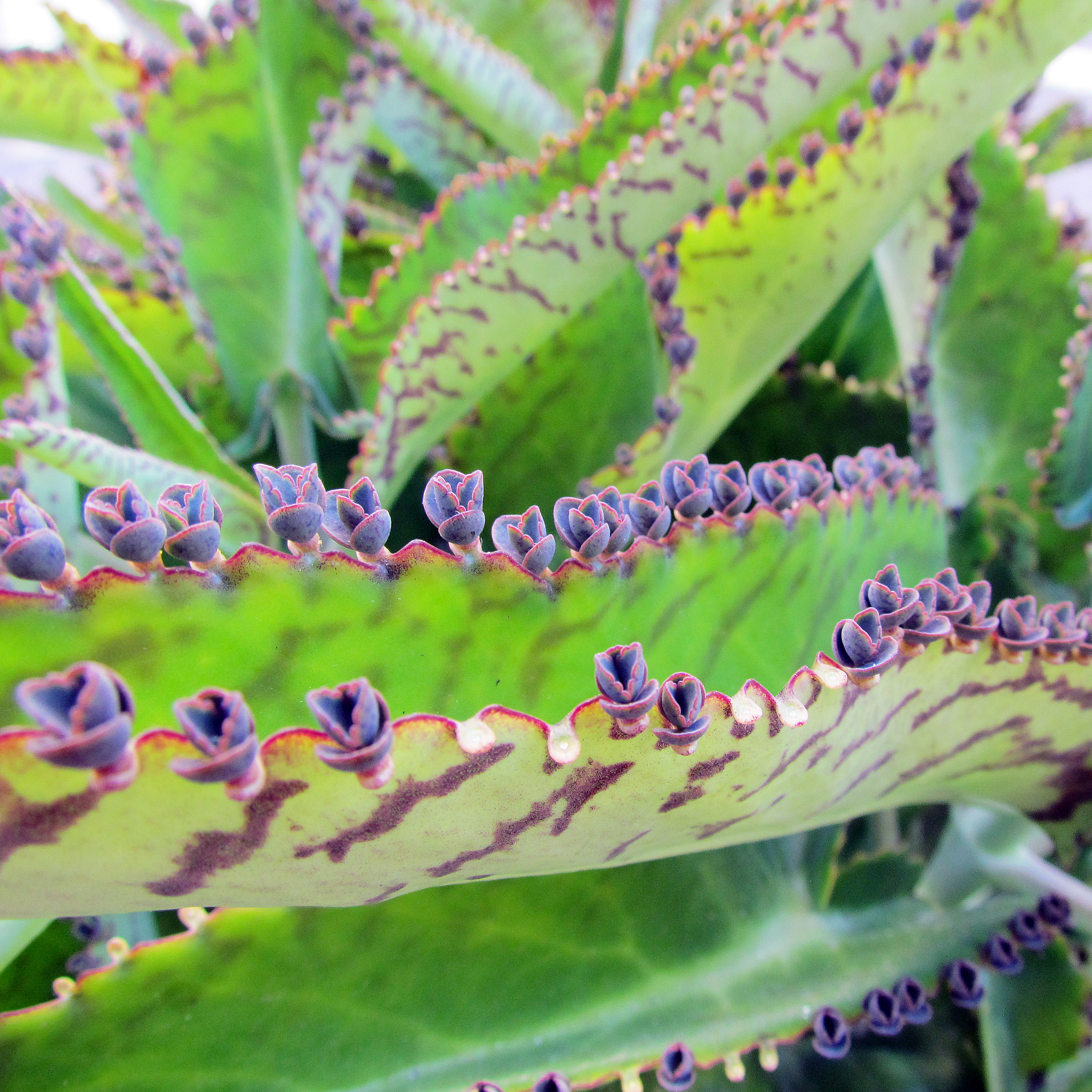
- Plantlets on leaves

Conservation status
- Endangered (IUCN 3.1)

Scientific classification
- Kingdom: Plantae
- Clade: Tracheophytes
- Clade: Angiosperms
- Clade: Eudicots
- Order: Saxifragales
- Family: Crassulaceae
- Genus: Kalanchoe
- Species: K. daigremontiana

Binomial name
- Kalanchoe daigremontiana Raym.-Hamet & H.Perrier

Synonyms
- Bryophyllum daigremontianum (Raym.-Hamet & H.Perrier) A.Berger

= Kalanchoe daigremontiana =

Succulent plant native to Madagascar

Kalanchoe daigremontiana, formerly known as Bryophyllum daigremontianum and commonly called mother of thousands, alligator plant or Mexican hat plant, is a succulent plant native to Madagascar. Like other members of Bryophyllum (now included in the genus Kalanchoe), it can propagate vegetatively from plantlets that develop on its leaf margins, as well as through upshoots from lateral roots, and seeds. All parts of this species contain a very toxic steroid known as daigremontianin.

It is often confused with Kalanchoe laetivirens, Kalanchoe delagoensis and Kalanchoe × houghtonii. The leaves of Kalanchoe laetivirens are completely green, while Kalanchoe daigremontiana has bands or spots on the back of leaves. The leaves of Kalanchoe delagoensis are linear, while Kalanchoe daigremontiana has lanceolate, oblong, ovate or triangular leaves. Kalanchoe × houghtonii is a hybrid between Kalanchoe daigremontiana and Kalanchoe delagoensis, therefore has characteristics in between; its leaves are narrower than those of Kalanchoe daigremontiana and its leaf base is attenuate, cuneate to weakly cordate or auriculate, while Kalanchoe daigremontiana has strongly cordate to auriculate or even peltate leaves.

== Morphology ==
Plants grow up to 1 m (3 ft 3 in) tall and have opposite-decussate, fleshy ovate to elongated-triangular leaves which grow up to 20 cm (8 in) long and 5 cm (2 in) wide. They are green above and blotched with purple underneath. Leaf margins have spoon-shaped bulbiliferous spurs which bear plantlets which may form roots while still attached to leaves.

A plant may also develop lateral roots on its main stalk, as high up as 10–15 cm (3.9–5.9 in) above the ground. A plant's upper leaves may grow large, causing its main stalk to bend downward. Then the lateral roots may enter soil and new vertical shoots may grow from the original shoot. Kalanchoe daigremontiana can spread by both seeds and by plantlets dropped from its leaves.

Kalanchoe daigremontiana has an umbrella-like terminal inflorescence (a compound cyme) of small bell-shaped, grayish pink (or sometimes orange) flowers. Flowering is, however, not an annual event and occurs sporadically if at all on some shoots. Particularly in climates with distinct seasonal temperature differences, flowering is most frequently observed at the beginning of a warm season. Indoor plants, as well as balcony plants which have been moved inside to survive the cold season, begin flowering in early winter.

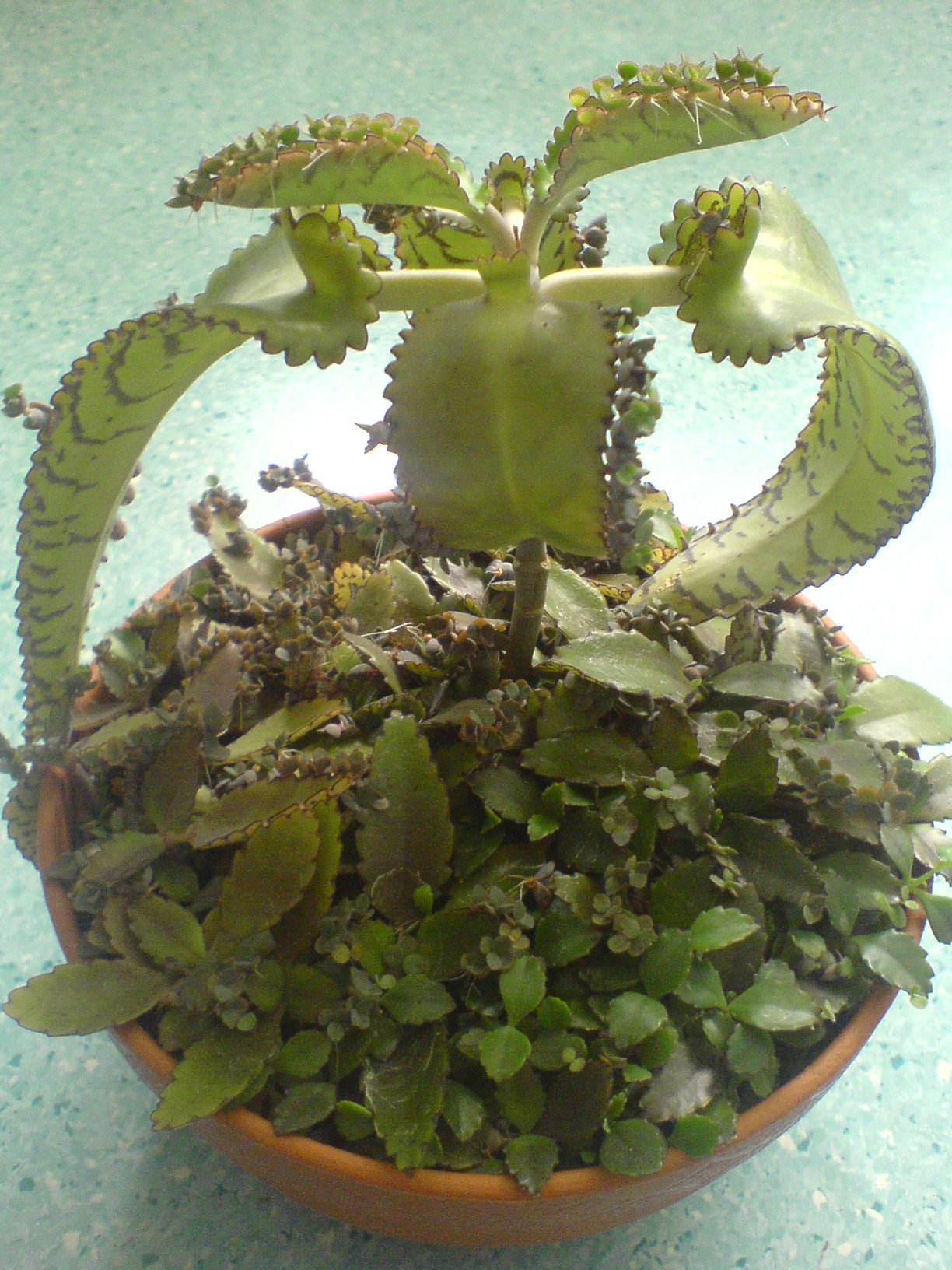
''Variegata Negra''

As a succulent plant, Kalanchoe daigremontiana can survive prolonged periods of drought with little or no water. During growth periods with higher temperatures and increased water supply, this species requires proper nutrition, without which leaves show deficiency symptoms such as crippled growth and pustule-like lesions. The plant is not frost-hardy and typically dies in places where temperatures are below freezing.

== Physiology ==
Plants of the genus Kalanchoe as well as many other plants growing in arid regions photosynthesize via Crassulacean acid metabolism. During Crassulacean acid metabolism, carbon dioxide is taken up mainly during the night and stored in leaf-cell vacuoles as malic acid. During daytime, the stored acid releases carbon dioxide for photosynthesis while stomata stays largely closed which reduces water loss.

== Distribution ==
Kalanchoe daigremontiana is native to the Fiherenana River valley and Androhibolava mountains in southwest Madagascar. It has been introduced to numerous tropical and subtropical regions, such as Florida, Puerto Rico, Hawaii, Venezuela, Argentina, Brazil, Uruguay, and parts of southern Europe.

=== Habitat ===
Kalanchoe daigremontiana prefers to grow in rocky and dry places.

It can become an invasive plant and threaten natural ecosystems, especially in arid and semi-arid environments (South Africa and regions of South America for example), where it can inhibit native-plant recruitment.

== Gallery ==
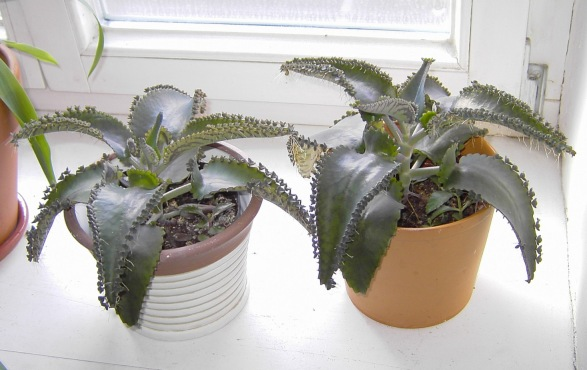
Kalanchoe daigremontiana potted

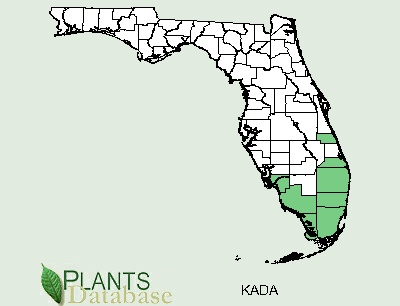
County distribution in Florida

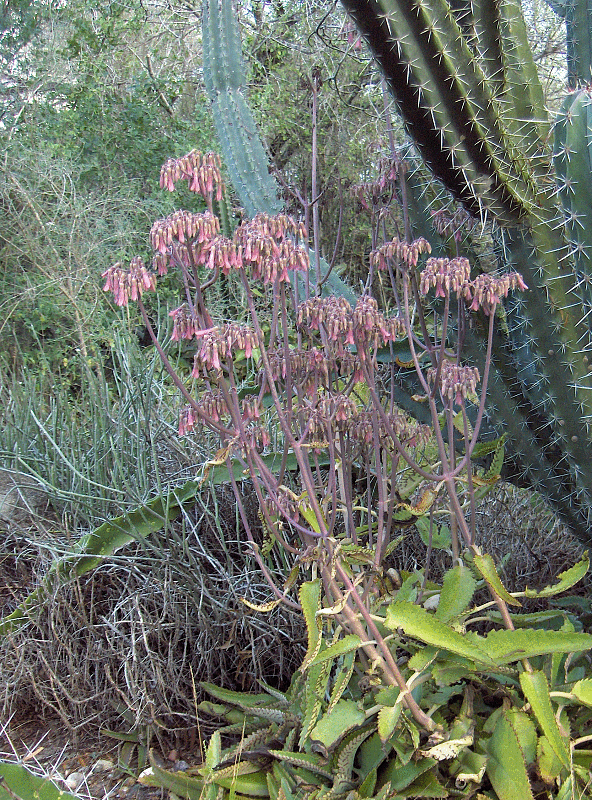
Flowers

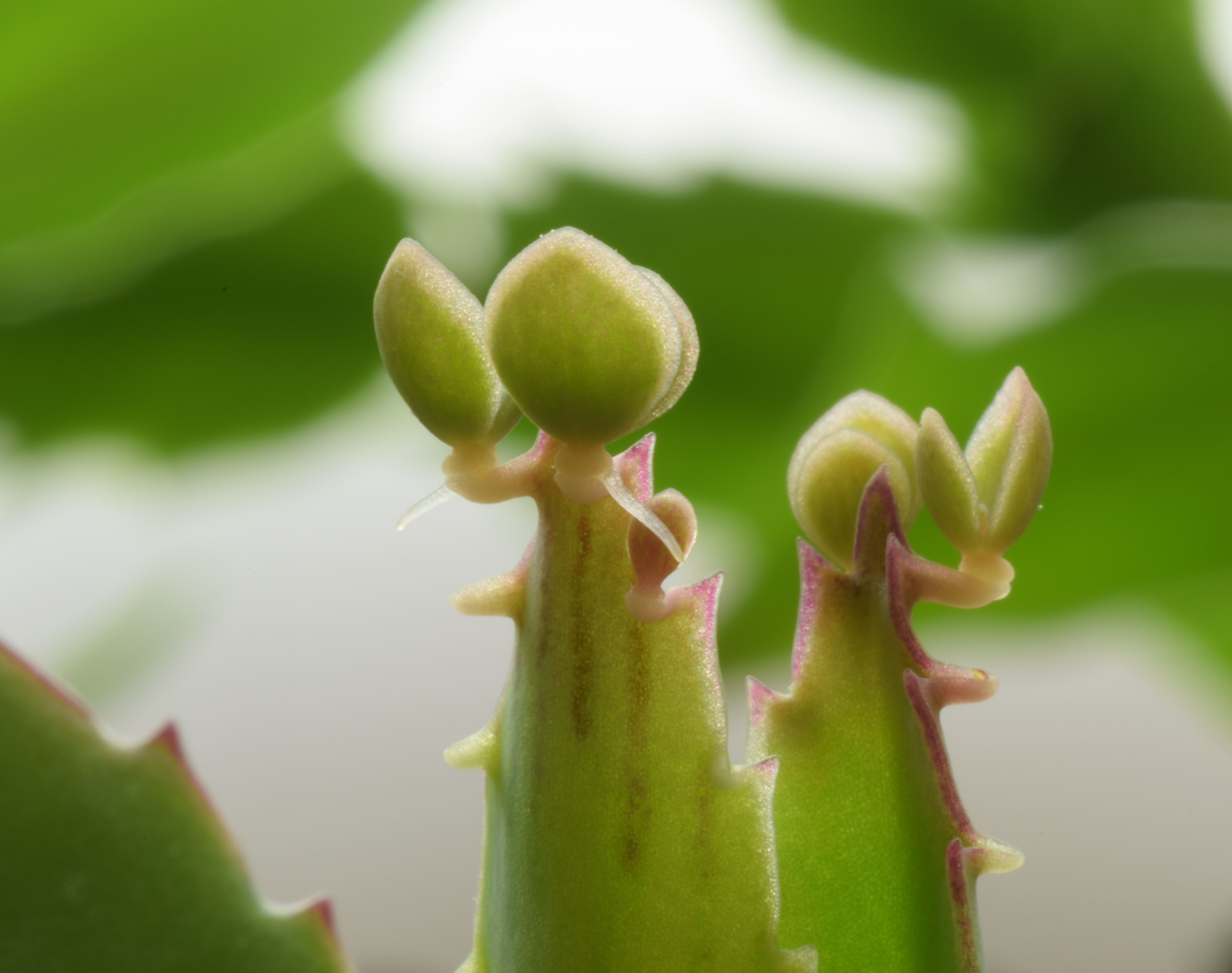
plantlets

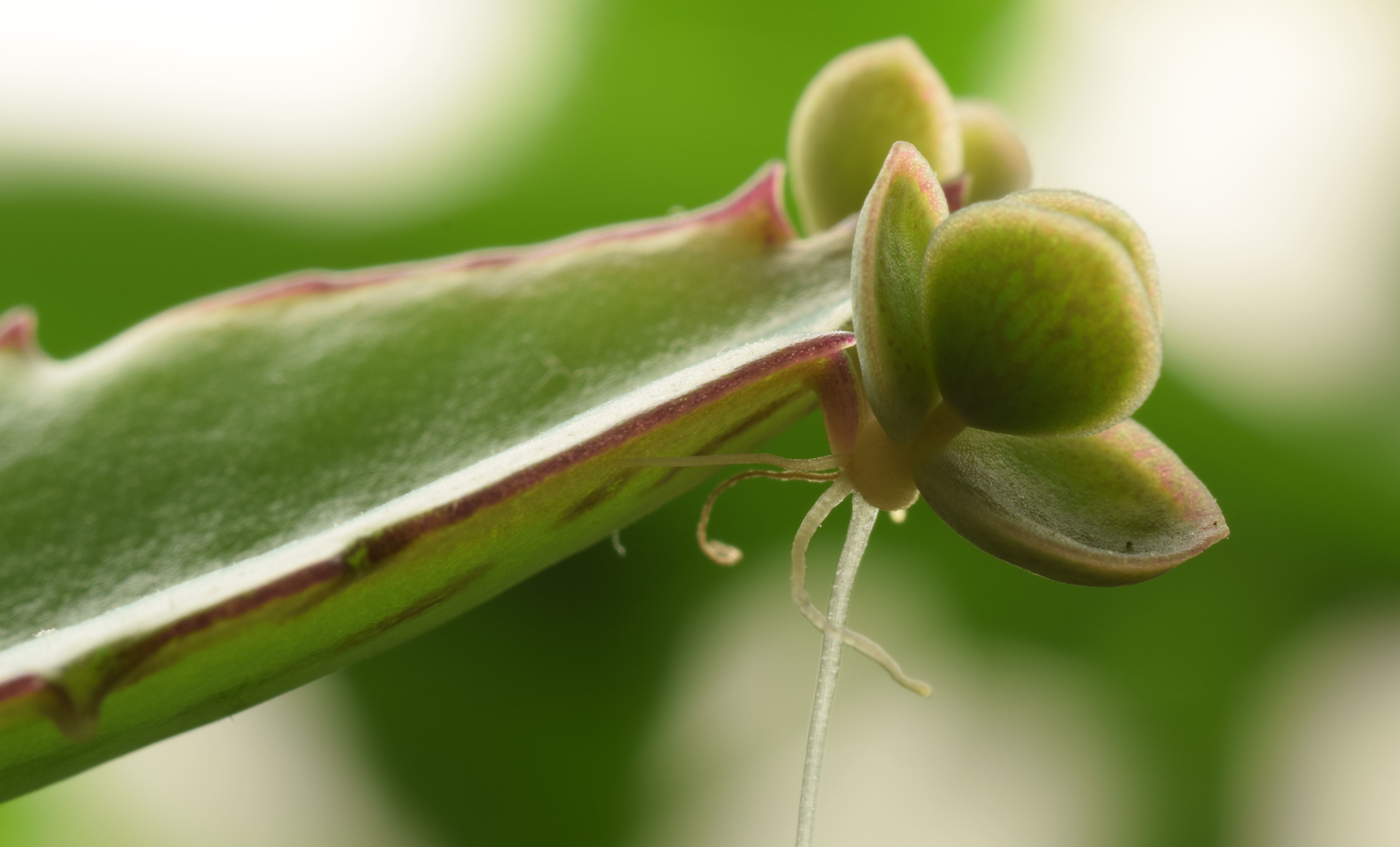
plantlets

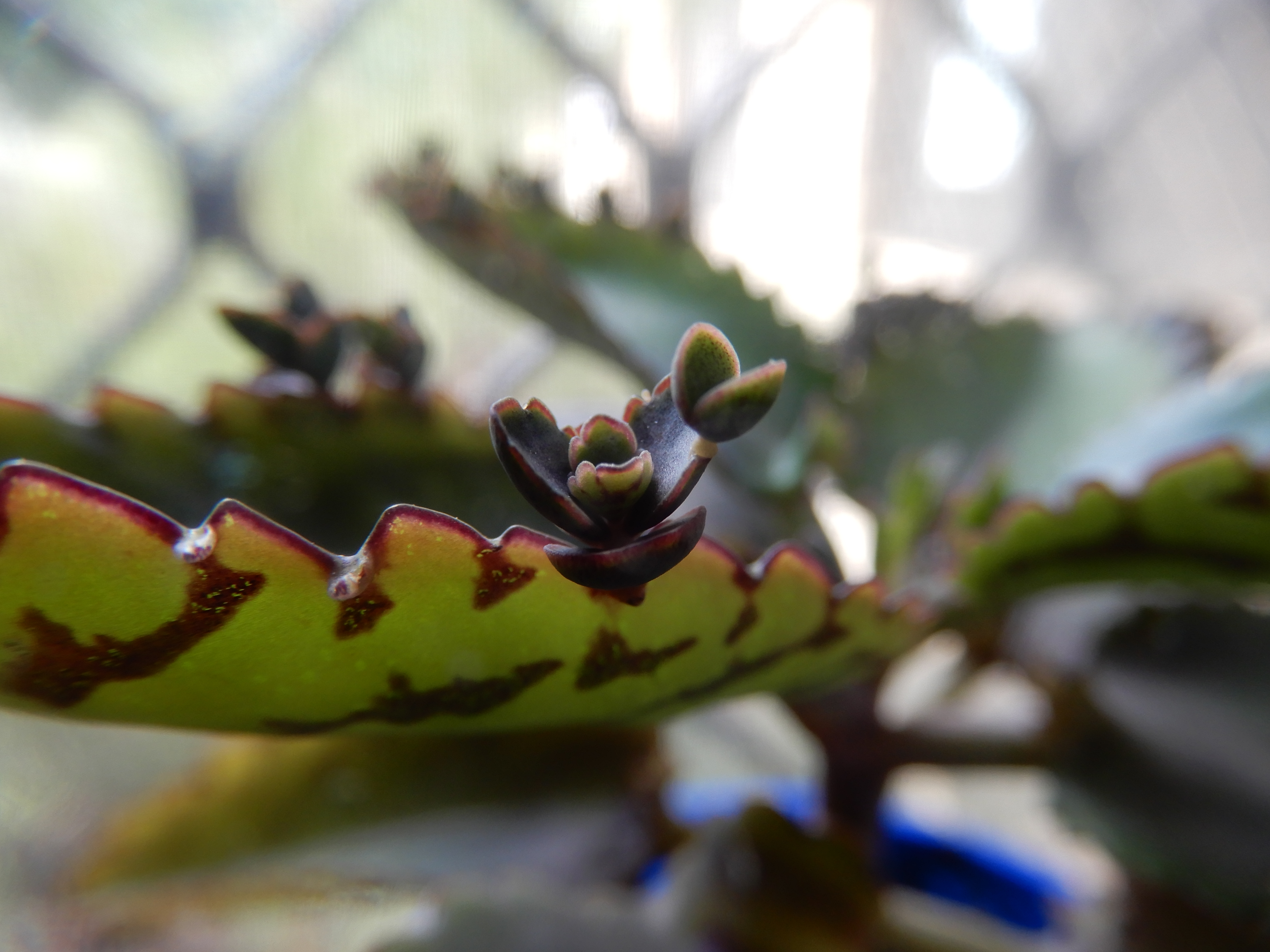
Kalanchoe daigremontiana plantlets on plantlets
