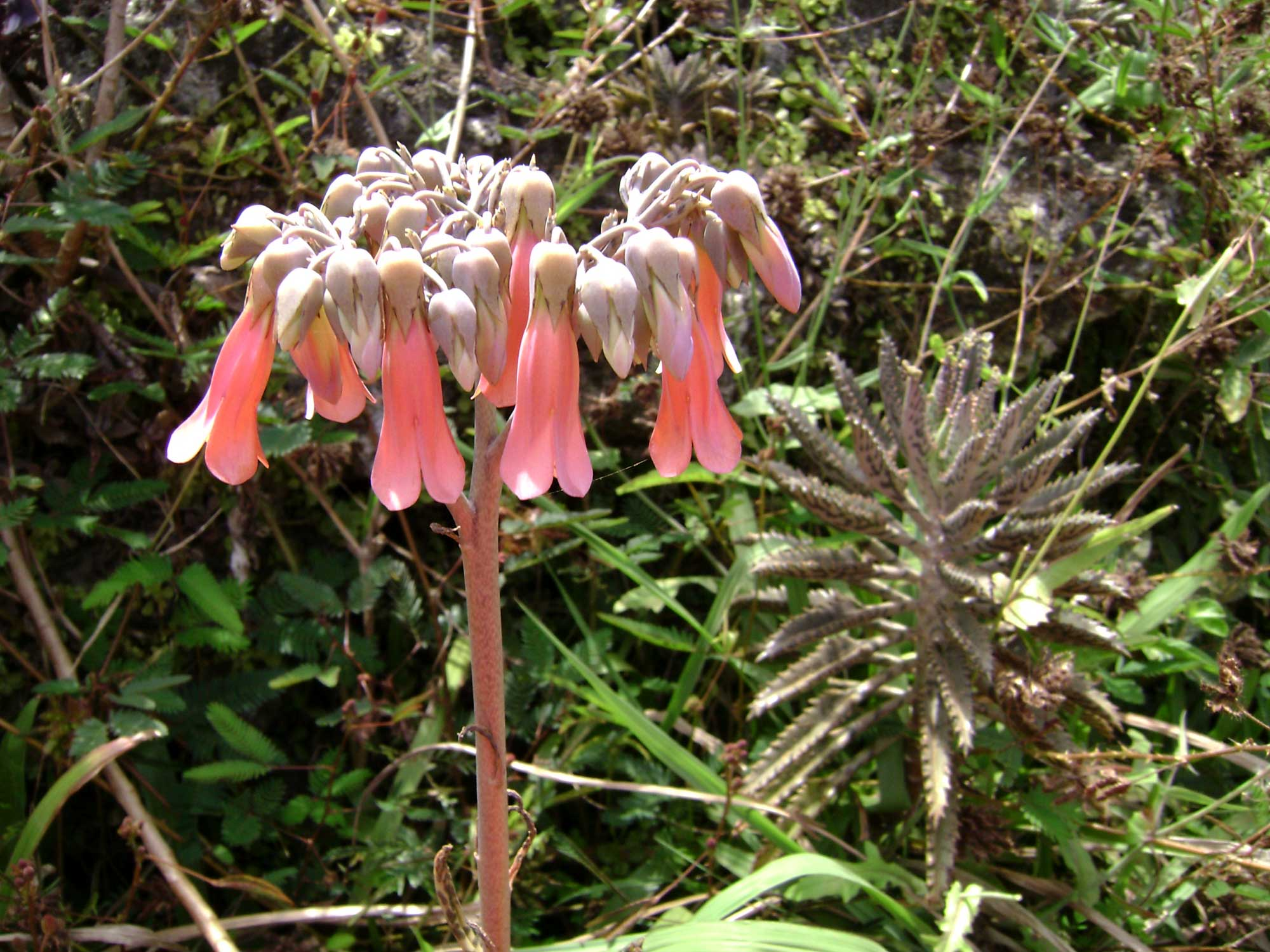

Scientific classification
- Kingdom: Plantae
- Clade: Tracheophytes
- Clade: Angiosperms
- Clade: Eudicots
- Order: Saxifragales
- Family: Crassulaceae
- Genus: Kalanchoe
- Species: K. × houghtonii

Binomial name
- Kalanchoe × houghtonii D.B.Ward

Synonyms
- Bryophyllum × houghtonii (D.B.Ward) P.I.Forst.

= Kalanchoe × houghtonii =

Species of succulent

Kalanchoe × houghtonii is a hybrid between Kalanchoe daigremontiana and Kalanchoe delagoensis named after Arthur Duvernoix Houghton. It is often confused with Kalanchoe daigremontiana which has strongly cordate to auriculate or even peltate leaves, while the leaves of Kalanchoe × houghtonii are narrower and the leaf base is attenuate, cuneate to weakly cordate or auriculate. In hortuculture, it is often mislabelled as Kalanchoe serrata, which is a different species.

There are four morphotypes (A, B, C, and D), and only Morphotype A is considered invasive. Morphotypes A, B, and C would finally transition to tricussate (alternative or ternately whorled) leaves like K. delagoensis, while the leaves of Morphotype D remain decussate (opposite) like those of K. daigremontiana.

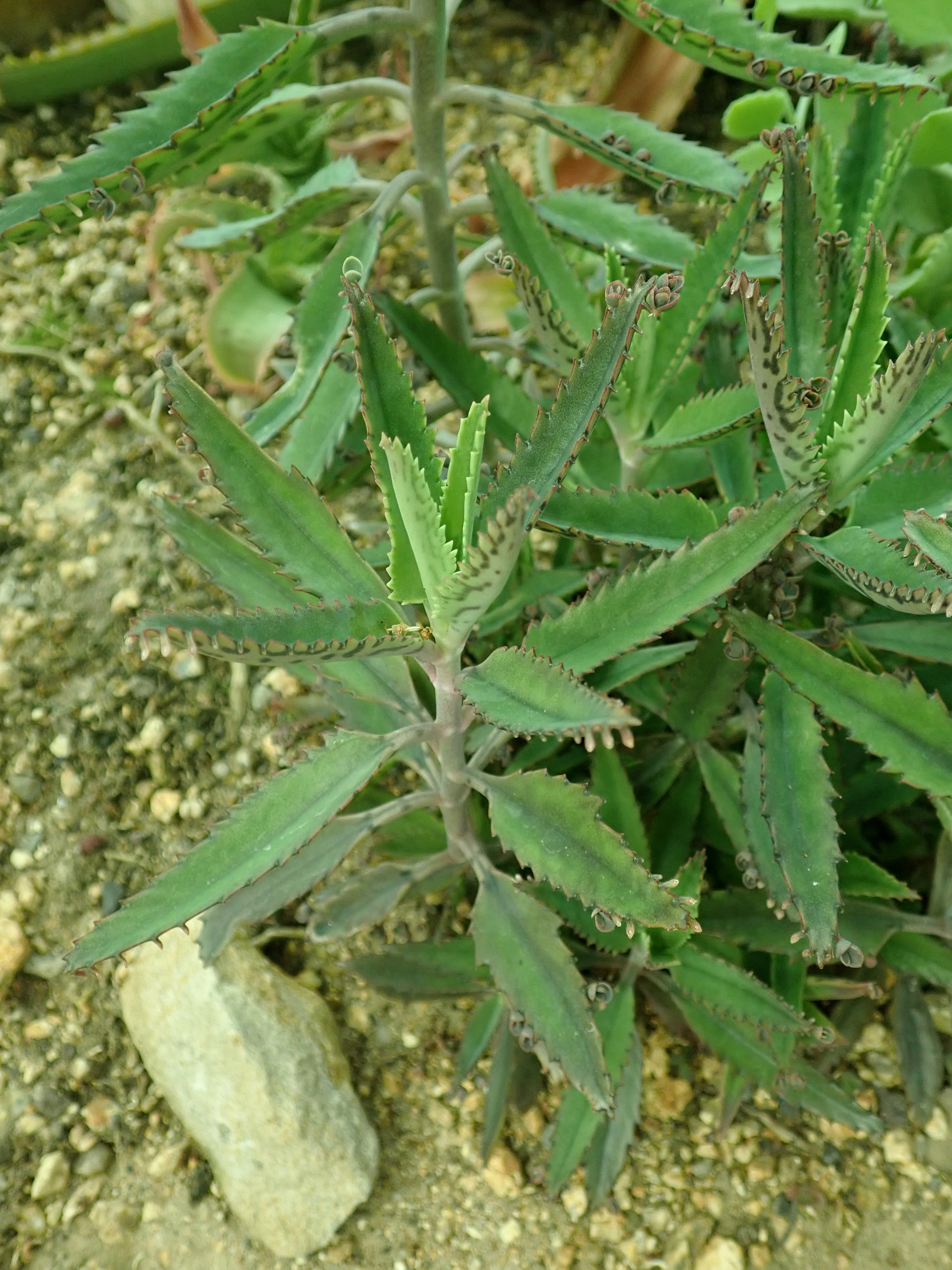
Morphotype A

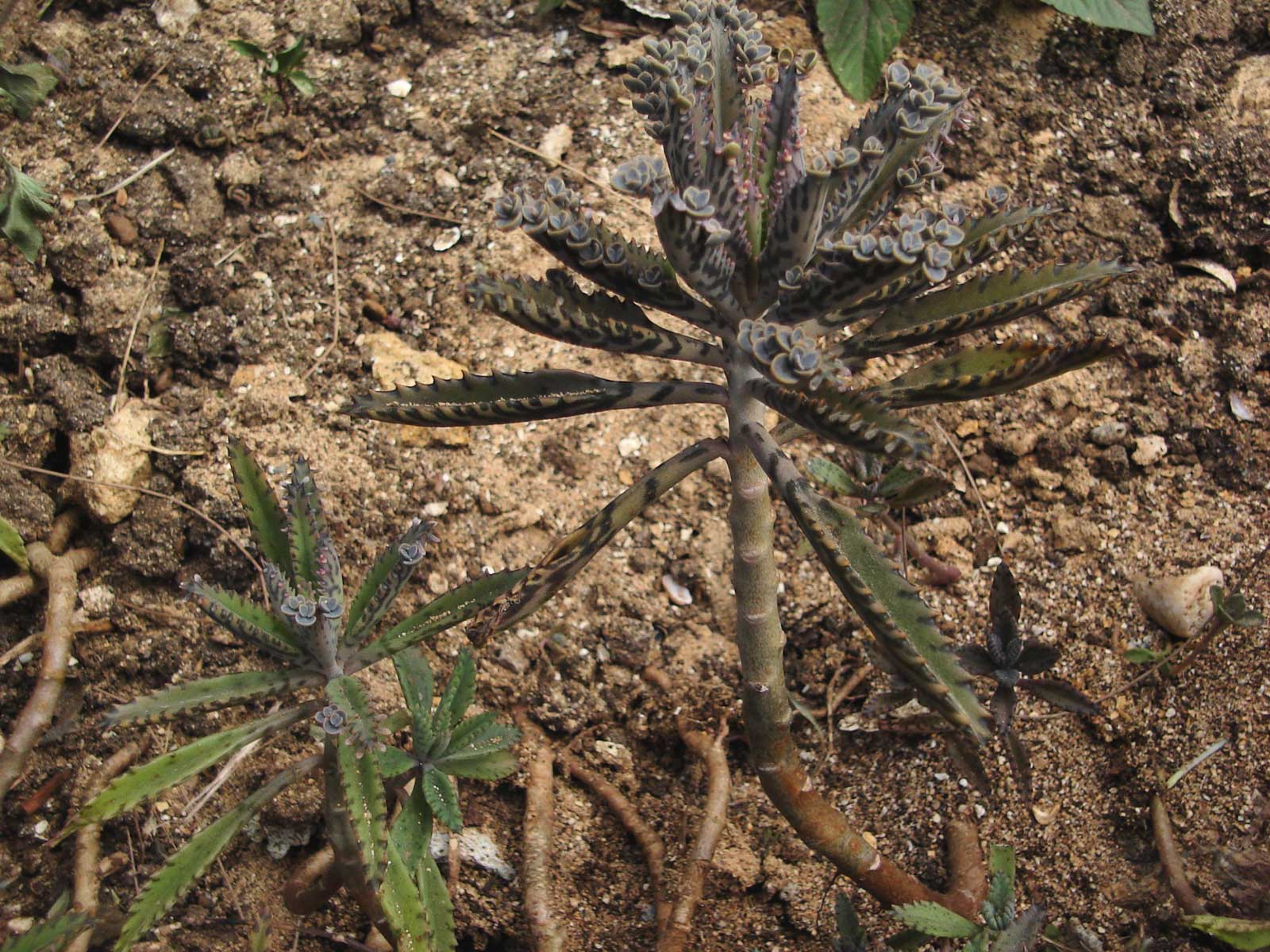
Morphotype B
