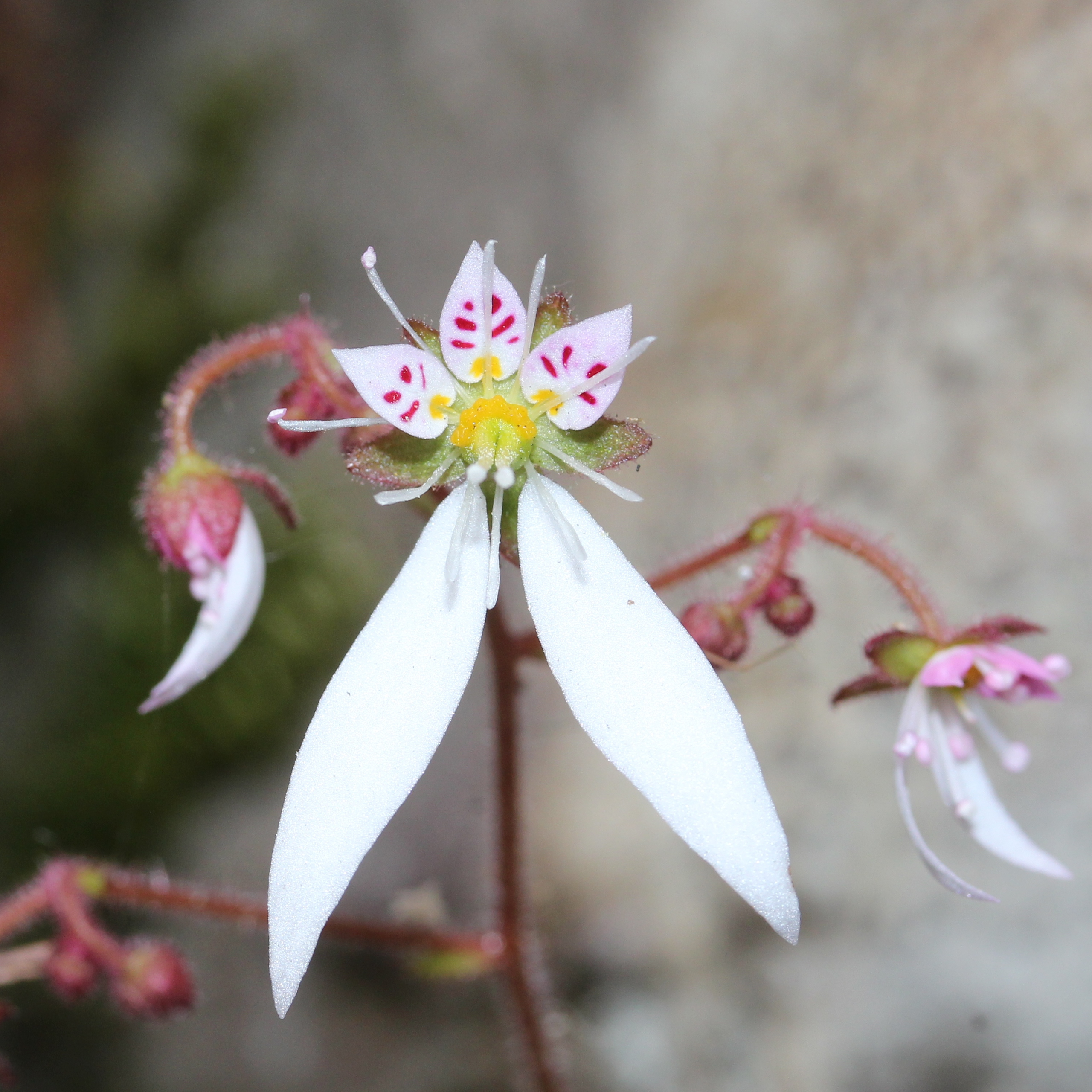

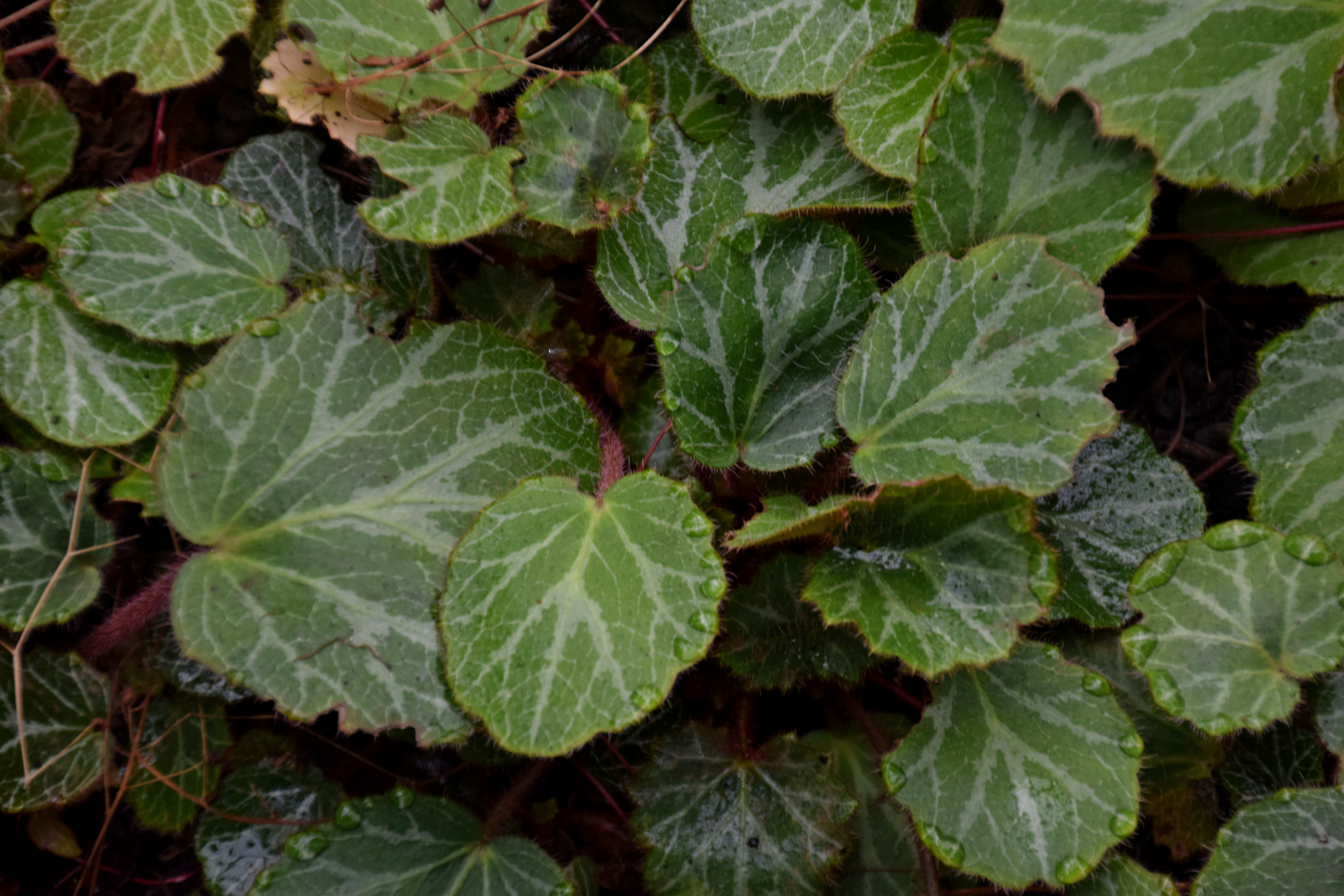

Scientific classification
- Kingdom: Plantae
- Clade: Tracheophytes
- Clade: Angiosperms
- Clade: Eudicots
- Order: Saxifragales
- Family: Saxifragaceae
- Genus: Saxifraga
- Species: S. stolonifera

Binomial name
- Saxifraga stolonifera Curtis

Synonyms
- Adenogyna sarmentosa (L.f.) Raf.; Aphomonix hederacea Raf.; Diptera cuscutiformis (Lodd.) Heynh.; Diptera sarmentosa (L. f.) Losinsk.; Diptera sarmentosa (L.f.) Borkh.; Ligularia sarmentosa (L. f.) Haw.; Ligularia sarmentosa (L.f.) Duval; Robertsonia sarmentosa (L.f.) Link; Rupifraga cuscutiformis (Lodd.) Raf.; Rupifraga sarmentosa (L.f.) Raf.; Saxifraga chaffanjonii H. Lév.; Saxifraga chinensis Lour.; Saxifraga cuscutiformis Lodd.; Saxifraga dumetorum Balf. f.; Saxifraga iochanensis H. Lév.; Saxifraga ligulata Murray; Saxifraga sarmentosa L.f.; Saxifraga veitchiana Balf. f.; Sekika sarmentosa (L.f.) Moench

= Saxifraga stolonifera =

Species of flowering plant

Saxifraga stolonifera is a perennial flowering plant known by several common names, including creeping saxifrage, strawberry saxifrage, creeping rockfoil, Aaron's beard, mother of thousands, roving sailor, and strawberry begonia or strawberry geranium, though it is neither a true begonia nor a geranium; both these latter plants belong to different families.

== Range ==
The plant is native to China, Japan and Korea, but it is widespread in much of the temperate regions of Eurasia and in North America. In their homeland, they thrive in forests, in bushes, in meadows, even on rocks, at altitudes of 400 to 4500 meters. It is now used as an ornamental plant worldwide.

== Description ==
The plant spreads via threadlike red stolons (runners), with plantlets taking root in the vicinity of the mother plant. It is hardy to USDA zone 5. It grows as a perennial herbaceous plant 10 to 20 cm tall, whose inflorescence bears small zygomorphous flowers that bloom during the transition between spring and summer.

Like strawberry plants, it produces stolons with clones at the tip, allowing it to spread easily. It develops long thin extensions with scale-shaped leaves. Its petiole is 15-21 cm long. The basal leaves are green above with silver gray nerves and reddish below. The leaf is round in outline and irregularly serrated at the edge, trimmed at the base, rounded or heart-shaped. The stem leaves are lanceolate and only 6 mm long and 2 mm wide.

The flowering period is May to August. The loose, paniculate inflorescence contains 7 to 60 flowers. The sepals are protruding or struck back. Two of the five white petals are characteristically longer than the rest. The longer petals are lanceolate, 6-15 mm long and 2-4 mm wide and pointed. The smaller petals are red or yellow dotted and 2-4 mm long and 1-2 mm wide. The stamens are 4.5 mm long. The ovary is pale yellow.

== Uses ==
The foliage is occasionally used fresh or cooked in Japanese cuisine. It was also used as an herbal remedy in classical Japan. It contains quercetin which has been shown to have anti-cancer activity in vitro.

=== Cultivation ===
A popular garden flower, Saxifraga stolonifera has attractive white blossoms with distinctive pointed petals and bright yellow ovary. It requires a sheltered spot in full or partial shade. Its creeping green foliage makes a good groundcover. In favorable conditions it is semi-evergreen. It has gained the Royal Horticultural Society's Award of Garden Merit.
