= Plant reproduction =

Production of new offspring in plants

Plants may reproduce sexually or asexually. Sexual reproduction produces offspring by the fusion of gametes, resulting in offspring genetically different from either parent. Vegetative reproduction produces new individuals without the fusion of gametes, resulting in clonal plants that are genetically identical to the parent plant and each other, unless mutations occur. In asexual reproduction, only one parent is involved.

== Asexual reproduction ==
Asexual reproduction does not involve the production and fusion of male and female gametes. Asexual reproduction may occur through budding, fragmentation, spore formation, regeneration and vegetative propagation.

Asexual reproduction is a type of reproduction where the offspring comes from one parent only, thus inheriting the characteristics of the parent. Asexual reproduction in plants occurs in two fundamental forms, vegetative reproduction and agamospermy. Vegetative reproduction involves a vegetative piece of the original plant producing new individuals by budding, tillering, etc. and is distinguished from apomixis, which is a replacement of sexual reproduction, and in some cases involves seeds. Apomixis occurs in many plant species such as dandelions (Taraxacum species) and also in some non-plant organisms. For apomixis and similar processes in non-plant organisms, see parthenogenesis.

Natural vegetative reproduction is a process mostly found in perennial plants, and typically involves structural modifications of the stem or roots and in a few species leaves. Most plant species that employ vegetative reproduction do so as a means to perennialize the plants, allowing them to survive from one season to the next and often facilitating their expansion in size. A plant that persists in a location through vegetative reproduction of individuals gives rise to a clonal colony. A single ramet, or apparent individual, of a clonal colony is genetically identical to all others in the same colony. The distance that a plant can move during vegetative reproduction is limited, though some plants can produce ramets from branching rhizomes or stolons that cover a wide area, often in only a few growing seasons. In a sense, this process is not one of reproduction but one of survival and expansion of biomass of the individual. When an individual organism increases in size via cell multiplication and remains intact, the process is called vegetative growth. However, in vegetative reproduction, the new plants that result are new individuals in almost every respect except genetic. A major disadvantage of vegetative reproduction is the transmission of pathogens from parent to offspring. It is uncommon for pathogens to be transmitted from the plant to its seeds (in sexual reproduction or in apomixis), though there are occasions when it occurs.

Seeds generated by apomixis are a means of asexual reproduction, involving the formation and dispersal of seeds that do not originate from the fertilization of the embryos. Hawkweeds (Hieracium), dandelions (Taraxacum), some species of Citrus and Kentucky blue grass (Poa pratensis) all use this form of asexual reproduction. Pseudogamy occurs in some plants that have apomictic seeds, where pollination is often needed to initiate embryo growth, though the pollen contributes no genetic material to the developing offspring. Other forms of apomixis occur in plants also, including the generation of a plantlet in replacement of a seed or the generation of bulbils instead of flowers, where new cloned individuals are produced.

=== Structures ===
A rhizome is a modified underground stem serving as an organ of vegetative reproduction; the growing tips of the rhizome can separate as new plants, e.g., polypody, iris, couch grass and nettles.

Prostrate aerial stems, called runners or stolons, are important vegetative reproduction organs in some species, such as the strawberry, numerous grasses, and some ferns.

Adventitious buds form on roots near the ground surface, on damaged stems (as on the stumps of cut trees), or on old roots. These develop into above-ground stems and leaves. A form of budding called suckering is the reproduction or regeneration of a plant by shoots that arise from an existing root system. Species that characteristically produce suckers include elm (Ulmus) and many members of the rose family such as Rosa, Kerria and Rubus.

Bulbous plants such as onion (Allium cepa), hyacinths, narcissi and tulips reproduce vegetatively by dividing their underground bulbs into more bulbs. Other plants like potatoes (Solanum tuberosum) and dahlias reproduce vegetatively from underground tubers. Gladioli and crocuses reproduce vegetatively in a similar way with corms.

Gemmae are single cells or masses of cells that detach from plants to form new clonal individuals. These are common in Liverworts and mosses and in the gametophyte generation of some filmy fern. They are also present in some Club mosses such as Huperzia lucidula . They are also found in some higher plants such as species of Drosera.

=== Usage ===
The most common form of plant reproduction used by people is seeds, but a number of asexual methods are used which are usually enhancements of natural processes, including: cutting, grafting, budding, layering, division, sectioning of rhizomes, roots, tubers, bulbs, stolons, tillers, etc., and artificial propagation by laboratory tissue cloning. Asexual methods are most often used to propagate cultivars with individual desirable characteristics that do not come true from seed. Fruit tree propagation is frequently performed by budding or grafting desirable cultivars (clones), onto rootstocks that are also clones, propagated by stooling.

In horticulture, a cutting is a branch that has been cut off from a mother plant below an internode and then rooted, often with the help of a rooting liquid or powder containing hormones. When a full root has formed and leaves begin to sprout anew, the clone is a self-sufficient plant, genetically identical.

Examples include cuttings from the stems of blackberries (Rubus occidentalis), African violets (Saintpaulia), verbenas (Verbena) to produce new plants. A related use of cuttings is grafting, where a stem or bud is joined onto a different stem. Nurseries offer for sale trees with grafted stems that can produce four or more varieties of related fruits, including apples. The most common usage of grafting is the propagation of cultivars onto already rooted plants, sometimes the rootstock is used to dwarf the plants or protect them from root damaging pathogens.

Since vegetatively propagated plants are clones, they are important tools in plant research. When a clone is grown in various conditions, differences in growth can be ascribed to environmental effects instead of genetic differences.

== Sexual reproduction ==
Sexual reproduction involves two fundamental processes: meiosis, which rearranges the genes and reduces the number of chromosomes, and fertilization, which restores the chromosome to a complete diploid number. In between these two processes, different types of plants and algae vary, but many of them, including all land plants, undergo alternation of generations, with two different multicellular structures (phases), a gametophyte and a sporophyte. The evolutionary origin and adaptive significance of sexual reproduction are discussed in the pages Evolution of sexual reproduction and Origin and function of meiosis.

The gametophyte is the multicellular structure (plant) that is haploid, containing a single set of chromosomes in each cell. The gametophyte produces male or female gametes (or both), by a process of cell division, called mitosis. In vascular plants with separate gametophytes, female gametophytes are known as mega gametophytes (mega=large, they produce the large egg cells) and the male gametophytes are called micro gametophytes (micro=small, they produce the small sperm cells).

The fusion of male and female gametes (fertilization) produces a diploid zygote, which develops by mitotic cell divisions into a multicellular sporophyte.

The mature sporophyte produces spores by meiosis, sometimes referred to as reduction division because the chromosome pairs are separated once again to form single sets.

In mosses and liverworts, the gametophyte is relatively large, and the sporophyte is a much smaller structure that is never separated from the gametophyte. In ferns, gymnosperms, and flowering plants (angiosperms), the gametophytes are relatively small and the sporophyte is much larger. In gymnosperms and flowering plants the megagametophyte is contained within the ovule (that may develop into a seed) and the microgametophyte is contained within a pollen grain.

=== History of sexual reproduction of plants ===
Unlike animals, plants are immobile, and cannot seek out sexual partners for reproduction. In the evolution of early plants, abiotic means, including water and much later, wind, transported sperm for reproduction. The first plants were aquatic, as described in the page Evolutionary history of plants, and released sperm freely into the water to be carried with the currents. Primitive land plants such as liverworts and mosses had motile sperm that swam in a thin film of water or were splashed in water droplets from the male reproduction organs onto the female organs. As taller and more complex plants evolved, modifications in the alternation of generations evolved. In the Paleozoic era progymnosperms reproduced by using spores dispersed on the wind. The seed plants including seed ferns, conifers and cordaites, which were all gymnosperms, evolved about 350 million years ago. They had pollen grains that contained the male gametes for protection of the sperm during the process of transfer from the male to female parts.

It is believed that insects fed on the pollen, and plants thus evolved to use insects to actively carry pollen from one plant to the next. Seed producing plants, which include the angiosperms and the gymnosperms, have a heteromorphic alternation of generations with large sporophytes containing much-reduced gametophytes. Angiosperms have distinctive reproductive organs called flowers, with carpels, and the female gametophyte is greatly reduced to a female embryo sac, with as few as eight cells. Each pollen grains contains a greatly reduced male gametophyte consisting of three or four cells. The sperm of seed plants are non-motile, except for two older groups of plants, the Cycadophyta and the Ginkgophyta, which have flagella.

Sexual reproduction in plants was not universally agreed upon during the establishment of modern botany, occasioning a bitter dispute in the 1730s and 1740s between Carolus Linnaeus and his correspondent Johann Georg Siegesbeck, who averred that "God would never have allowed such abominable unchastity among his innocent plants". The botanists who took Linnaeus's side in the dispute were distinguished during the 18th century as the Sexualists (Latin: Sexualistae).

=== Flowering plants ===
Flowering plants, the dominant plant group, reproduce both by sexual and asexual means. Their distinguishing feature is that their reproductive organs are contained in flowers. Sexual reproduction in flowering plants involves the production of separate male and female gametophytes that produce gametes.

The anther produces pollen grains that contain male gametophytes. The pollen grains attach to the stigma on top of a carpel, in which the female gametophytes (inside ovules) are located. Plants may either self-pollinate or cross-pollinate. The transfer of pollen (the male gametophytes) to the female stigmas occurs is called pollination. After pollination occurs, the pollen grain germinates to form a pollen tube that grows through the carpel's style and transports male nuclei to the ovule to fertilize the egg cell and central cell within the female gametophyte in a process termed double fertilization. The resulting zygote develops into an embryo, while the triploid endosperm (one sperm cell plus a binucleate female cell) and female tissues of the ovule give rise to the surrounding tissues in the developing seed. The fertilized ovules develop into seeds within a fruit formed from the ovary. When the seeds are ripe they may be dispersed together with the fruit or freed from it by various means to germinate and grow into the next generation.

==== Pollination ====
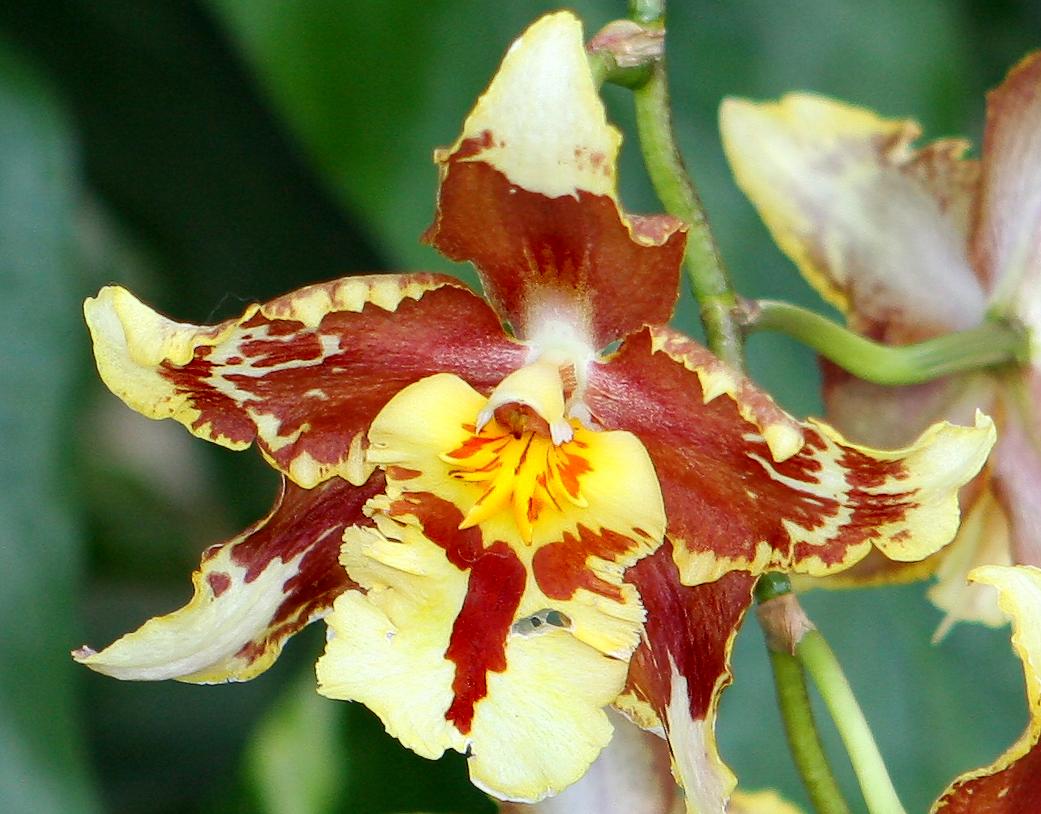
An orchid flower

Plants that use insects or other animals to move pollen from one flower to the next have developed greatly modified flower parts to attract pollinators and to facilitate the movement of pollen from one flower to the insect and from the insect to the next flower. Flowers of wind-pollinated plants tend to lack petals and or sepals; typically large amounts of pollen are produced and pollination often occurs early in the growing season before leaves can interfere with the dispersal of the pollen. Many trees and all grasses and sedges are wind-pollinated.

Plants have a number of different means to attract pollinators including color, scent, heat, nectar glands, edible pollen and flower shape. Along with modifications involving the above structures two other conditions play a very important role in the sexual reproduction of flowering plants, the first is the timing of flowering and the other is the size or number of flowers produced. Often plant species have a few large, very showy flowers while others produce many small flowers, often flowers are collected together into large inflorescences to maximize their visual effect, becoming more noticeable to passing pollinators. Flowers are attraction strategies and sexual expressions are functional strategies used to produce the next generation of plants, with pollinators and plants having co-evolved, often to some extraordinary degrees, very often rendering mutual benefit.

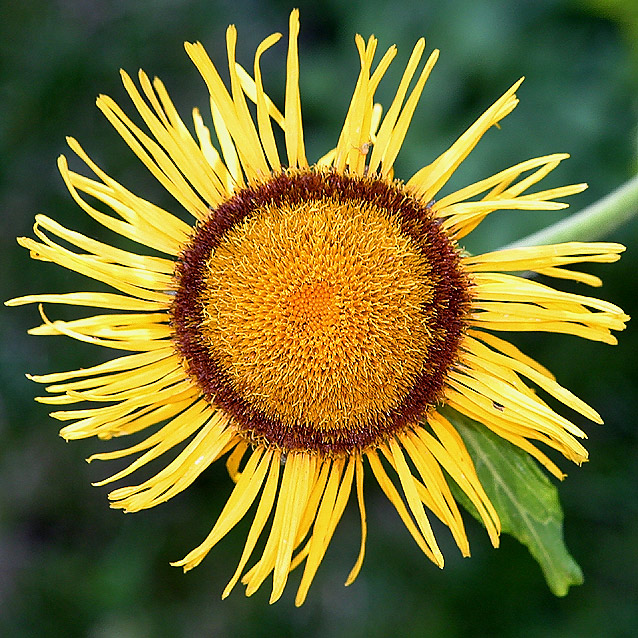
Flower heads showing disk and ray florets.

The largest family of flowering plants is the orchids (Orchidaceae), estimated by some specialists to include up to 35,000 species, which often have highly specialized flowers that attract particular insects for pollination. The stamens are modified to produce pollen in clusters called pollinia, which become attached to insects that crawl into the flower. The flower shapes may force insects to pass by the pollen, which is "glued" to the insect. Some orchids are even more highly specialized, with flower shapes that mimic the shape of insects to attract them to attempt to 'mate' with the flowers, a few even have scents that mimic insect pheromones.

Another large group of flowering plants is the Asteraceae or sunflower family with close to 22,000 species, which also have highly modified inflorescences composed of many individual flowers called florets. Heads with florets of one sex, when the flowers are pistillate or functionally staminate or made up of all bisexual florets, are called homogamous and can include discoid and liguliflorous type heads. Some radiate heads may be homogamous too. Plants with heads that have florets of two or more sexual forms are called heterogamous and include radiate and disciform head forms.

=== Ferns ===
Ferns typically produce large diploids with stem, roots, and leaves. On fertile leaves sporangia are produced, grouped together in sori and often protected by an indusium. If the spores are deposited onto a suitable moist substrate they germinate to produce short, thin, free-living gametophytes called prothalli that are typically heart-shaped, small and green in color. The gametophytes produce both motile sperm in the antheridia and egg cells in separate archegonia. After rains or when dew deposits a film of water, the motile sperm are splashed away from the antheridia, which are normally produced on the top side of the thallus, and swim in the film of water to the antheridia where they fertilize the egg. To promote out crossing or cross-fertilization the sperm is released before the eggs are receptive of the sperm, making it more likely that the sperm will fertilize the eggs of the different thallus. A zygote is formed after fertilization, which grows into a new sporophytic plant. The condition of having separate sporophyte and gametophyte plants is called alternation of generations. Other plants with similar reproductive strategies include Psilotum, Lycopodium, Selaginella and Equisetum.

=== Bryophytes ===
The bryophytes, which include liverworts, hornworts and mosses, can reproduce both sexually and vegetatively. The life cycles of these plants start with haploid spores that grow into the dominant form, which is a multicellular haploid gametophyte, with thalloid or leaf-like structures that photosynthesize. The gametophyte is the most commonly known phase of the plant. Bryophytes are typically small plants that grow in moist locations and like ferns, have motile sperm which swim to the ovule using flagella and therefore need water to facilitate sexual reproduction. Bryophytes show considerable variation in their reproductive structures, and a basic outline is as follows: Haploid gametes are produced in antheridia and archegonia by mitosis. The sperm released from the antheridia respond to chemicals released by ripe archegonia and swim to them in a film of water and fertilize the egg cells, thus producing zygotes that are diploid. The zygote divides repeatedly by mitotic division and grows into a diploid sporophyte. The resulting multicellular diploid sporophyte produces spore capsules called sporangia. The spores are produced by meiosis, and when ripe, the capsules burst open to release the spores. In some species each gametophyte is one sex while other species may be monoicous, producing both antheridia and archegonia on the same gametophyte which is thus hermaphrodite.

=== Algae ===
Sexual reproduction in the multicellular facultatively sexual green alga Volvox carteri is induced by oxidative stress. A two-fold increase in cellular reactive oxygen species (associated with oxidative stress) activates the V. carteri genes needed for sexual reproduction. Exposure to antioxidants inhibits the induction of sex in V. carteri. It was proposed on the basis of these observations that sexual reproduction emerged in V. carteri evolution as an adaptive response to oxidative stress and the DNA damage induced by reactive oxygen species. Oxidative stress induced DNA damage may be repaired during the meiotic event associated with germination of the zygospore and the start of a new generation.

== Dispersal and offspring care ==
One of the outcomes of plant reproduction is the generation of seeds, spores, and fruits that allow plants to move to new locations or new habitats.

Plants do not have nervous systems or any will for their actions. Even so, scientists are able to observe mechanisms that help their offspring thrive as they grow. All organisms have mechanisms to increase survival in offspring.

Offspring care is observed in the Mammillaria hernandezii, a small cactus found in Mexico. A cactus is a type of succulent, meaning it retains water when it is available for future droughts. M. hernandezii also stores a portion of its seeds in its stem, and releases the rest to grow. This can be advantageous for many reasons. By delaying the release of some of its seeds, the cactus can protect these from potential threats from insects, herbivores, or mold caused by micro-organisms. A study found that the presence of adequate water in the environment causes M. Hernandezii to release more seeds to allow for germination. The plant was able to perceive a water potential gradient in the surroundings, and act by giving its seeds a better chance in this preferable environment. This evolutionary strategy gives a better potential outcome for seed germination.

== See also ==
- Asexual reproduction
- Meiosis
