= Plantlet =

Young or small plant

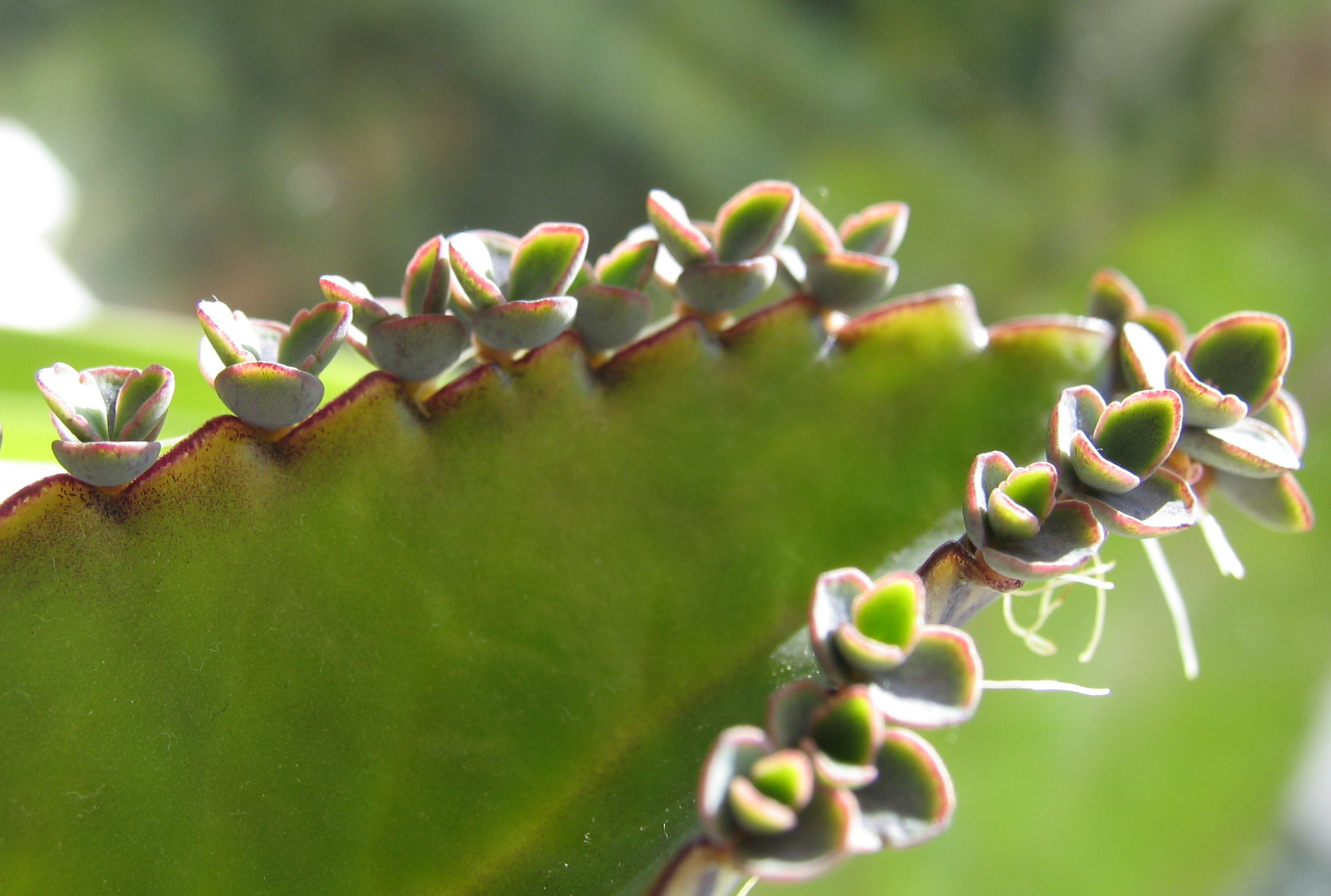
Kalanchoe daigremontiana with plantlets on one of the leaves

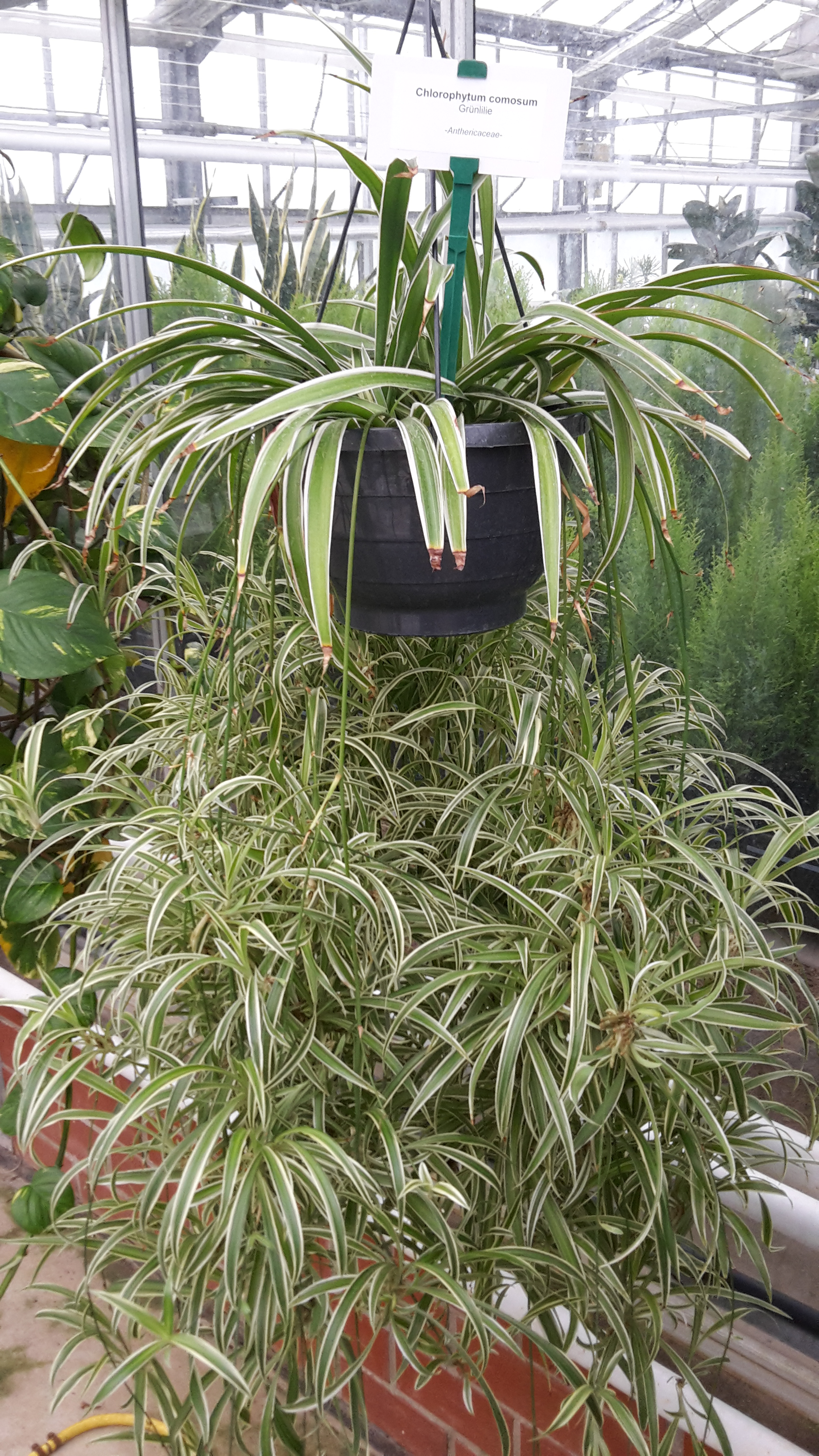
Chlorophytum comosum "Variegatum" in a hanging basket showing the plantlets

A plantlet is a young or small plant, produced on the leaf margins or the aerial stems of another plant.

Some plants, such as spider plants, grow stolons with plantlets on the ends as a form of asexual reproduction. Vegetative propagules or clippings of mature plants may form plantlets. Examples of plantlets budding from leaf or stem tissue may be found in several species known as mother of thousands. Kalanchoe daigremontiana forms somatic embryos on its leaf margins that germinate into deciduous juvenile plants before falling from the parent and growing independently.

== See also ==
- Apomixis
- Plant propagation
- Plant reproduction
