= Vegetative reproduction =

Asexual method of reproduction in plants

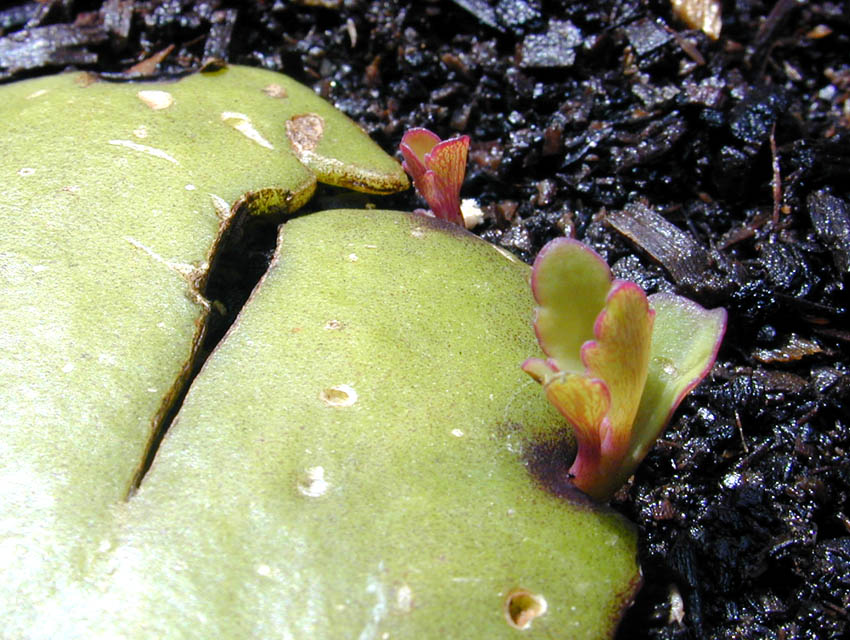
Production of new individuals along a leaf margin of the air plant, Kalanchoe pinnata. The small plant in front is about 1 cm tall. The concept of "individual" is stretched by this process.

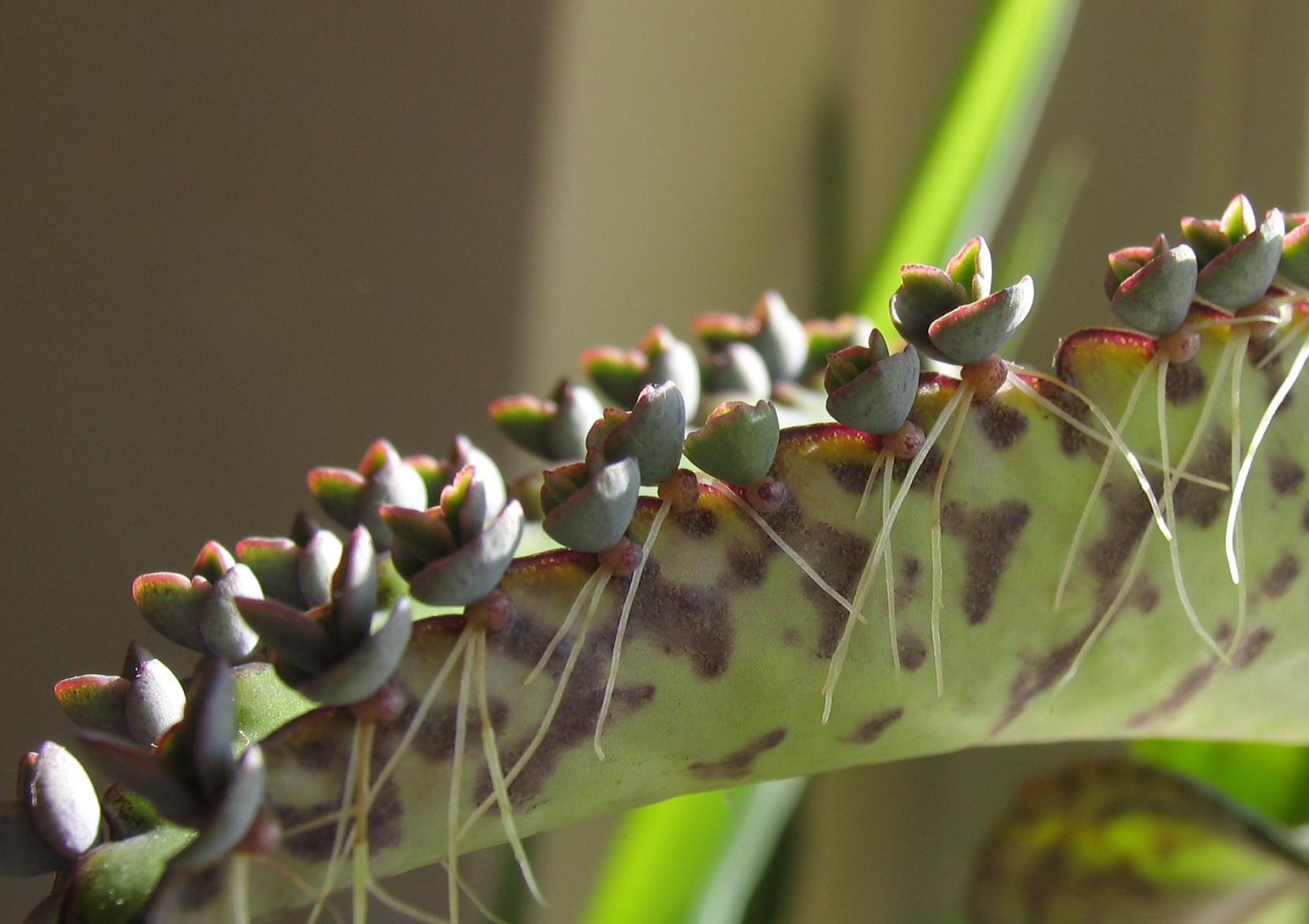
Kalanchoe daigremontiana produces plantlets along the margins of its leaves. When they are mature enough, they drop off and root in any suitable soil beneath.

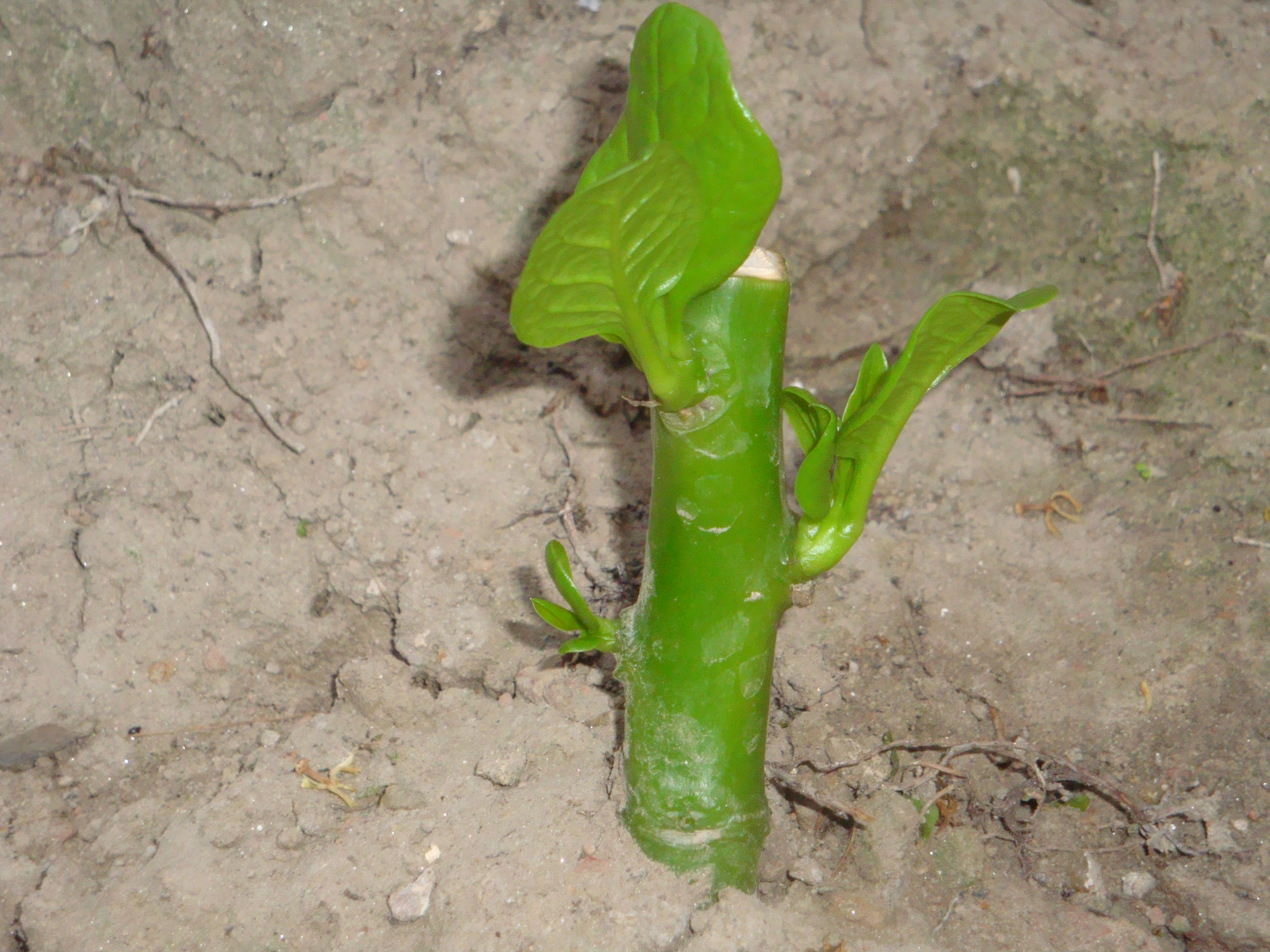
Vegetative reproduction from a stem cutting less than a week old. Some species are more conducive to this means of propagation than others.

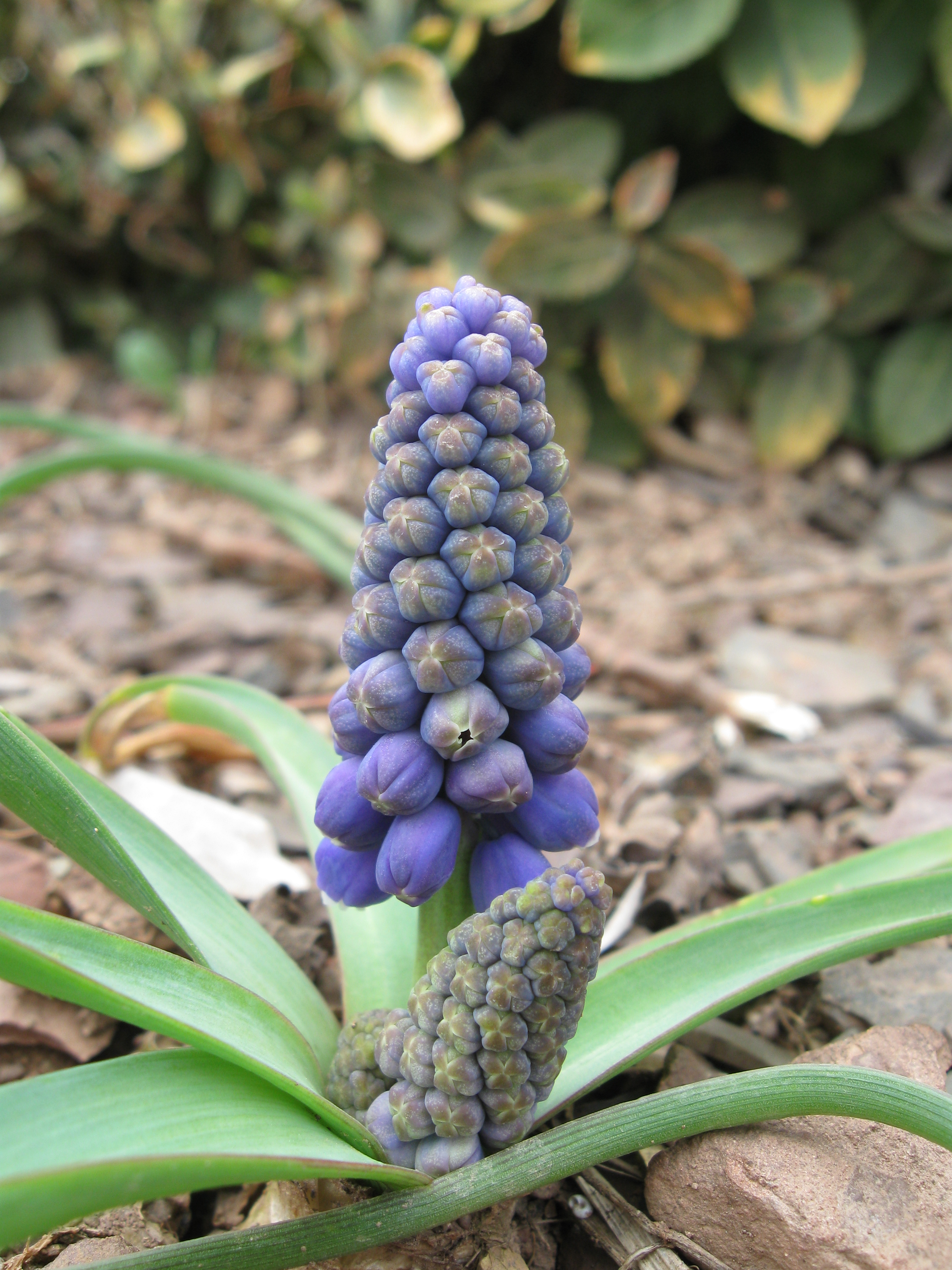
A bulb of Muscari has reproduced vegetatively underground to make two bulbs, each of which produces a flower stem.

Vegetative reproduction (also known as vegetative propagation, vegetative multiplication or cloning) is a form of asexual reproduction occurring in plants in which a new plant grows from a fragment or cutting of the parent plant or specialized reproductive structures, which are sometimes called vegetative propagules.

Many plants naturally reproduce this way, but it can also be induced artificially. Horticulturists have developed asexual propagation techniques that use vegetative propagules to replicate plants. Success rates and difficulty of propagation vary greatly. Monocotyledons typically lack a vascular cambium, making them more challenging to propagate.

== Plant propagation ==
Plant propagation is the process of plant reproduction of a species or cultivar, and it can be sexual or asexual. It can happen through the use of vegetative parts of the plants, such as leaves, stems, and roots to produce new plants or through growth from specialized vegetative plant parts.

While many plants reproduce by vegetative reproduction, they rarely exclusively use that method to reproduce. Vegetative reproduction is not evolutionarily advantageous; it does not allow for genetic diversity and could lead plants to accumulate deleterious mutations. Vegetative reproduction is favored when it allows plants to produce more offspring per unit of resource than reproduction through seed production. In general, juveniles of a plant are easier to propagate vegetatively.

Although most plants normally reproduce sexually, many can reproduce vegetatively, or can be induced to do so via hormonal treatments. This is because meristematic cells capable of cellular differentiation are present in many plant tissues.

Vegetative propagation is usually considered a cloning method. However, root cuttings of thornless blackberries (Rubus fruticosus) will revert to thorny type because the adventitious shoot develops from a cell that is genetically thorny. Thornless blackberry is a chimera, with the epidermal layers genetically thornless but the tissue beneath it genetically thorny.

Grafting is often not a complete cloning method because seedlings are used as rootstocks. In that case, only the top of the plant is clonal. In some crops, particularly apples, the rootstocks are vegetatively propagated so the entire graft can be clonal if the scion and rootstock are both clones. Apomixis (including apospory and diplospory) is a type of reproduction that does not involve fertilization. In flowering plants, unfertilized seeds are produced, or plantlets that grow instead of flowers. Hawkweed (Hieracium), dandelion (Taraxacum), some citrus (Citrus) and many grasses such as Kentucky bluegrass (Poa pratensis) all use this form of asexual reproduction. Bulbils are sometimes formed instead of the flowers of garlic.

== Mechanisms ==
Meristem tissue makes the process of asexual reproduction possible. It is normally found in stems, leaves, and tips of stems and roots and consists of undifferentiated cells that are constantly dividing allowing for plant growth and give rise to plant tissue systems. The meristem tissue's ability to continuously divide allows for vegetative propagation to occur.

Another important ability that allows for vegetative propagation is the ability to develop adventitious roots which arise from other vegetative parts of the plants such as the stem or leaves. These roots allow for the development of new plants from body parts from other plants.

== Advantages and disadvantages ==
=== Advantages ===
There are several advantages of vegetative reproduction, mainly that the produced offspring are clones of their parent plants. If a plant has favorable traits, it can continue to pass down its advantageous genetic information to its offspring. It can be economically beneficial for commercial growers to clone a certain plant to ensure consistency throughout their crops. Vegetative propagation also allows plants to avoid the costly and complex process of producing sexual reproduction organs such as flowers and the subsequent seeds and fruits. Developing an ace cultivar is extremely difficult, so, once farmers develop the desired traits in, for example, a lily, they use grafting and budding to ensure the consistency of the new cultivar and its successful production on a commercial level. However, as can be seen in many variegated plants, this does not always apply, because many plants actually are chimeras and cuttings might reflect the attributes of only one or some of the parent cell lines. Vegetative propagation also allows plants to circumvent the immature seedling phase and reach the mature phase faster. In nature, that increases the chances for a plant to successfully reach maturity, and, commercially, it saves farmers a lot of time and money as it allows for faster crop overturn.

Vegetative reproduction offers research advantages in several areas of biology and has practical usage when it comes to afforestation. The most common use made of vegetative propagation by forest geneticists and tree breeders has been to move genes from selected trees to some convenient location, usually designated a gene bank, clone bank, clone-holding orchard, or seed orchard where their genes can be recombined in pedigreed offspring.

Some analyses suggest that vegetative reproduction is a characteristic which makes a plant species more likely to become invasive. Since vegetative reproduction is often faster than sexual reproduction, it "quickly increases populations and may contribute to recovery following disturbance" (such as fires and floods).

=== Disadvantages ===
A major disadvantage of vegetative propagation is that it prevents species genetic diversity which can lead to reductions in crop yields. The plants are genetically identical and are all, therefore, susceptible to pathogenic plant viruses, bacteria and fungi that can wipe out entire crops.

== Types ==
=== Natural means ===
Natural vegetative propagation is mostly a process found in herbaceous and woody perennial plants, and typically involves structural modifications of the stem, although any horizontal, underground part of a plant (whether stem, leaf, or root) can contribute to vegetative reproduction of a plant. Most plant species that survive and significantly expand by vegetative reproduction would be perennial almost by definition, since specialized organs of vegetative reproduction, like seeds of annuals, serve to survive seasonally harsh conditions. A plant that persists in a location through vegetative reproduction of individuals over a long period of time constitutes a clonal colony.

In a sense, this process is not one of reproduction but one of survival and expansion of biomass of the individual. When an individual organism increases in size via cell multiplication and remains intact, the process is called "vegetative growth". However, in vegetative reproduction, the new plants that result are new individuals in almost every respect except genetic. Of considerable interest is how this process appears to reset the aging clock.

As previously mentioned, plants vegetatively propagate both artificially and naturally. Most common methods of natural vegetative reproduction involve the development of a new plant from specialized structures of a mature plant. In addition to adventitious roots, roots that arise from plant structures other than the root, such as stems or leaves, modified stems, leaves and roots play an important role in plants' ability to naturally propagate. The most common modified stems, leaves and roots that allow for vegetative propagation are:

==== Runners ====
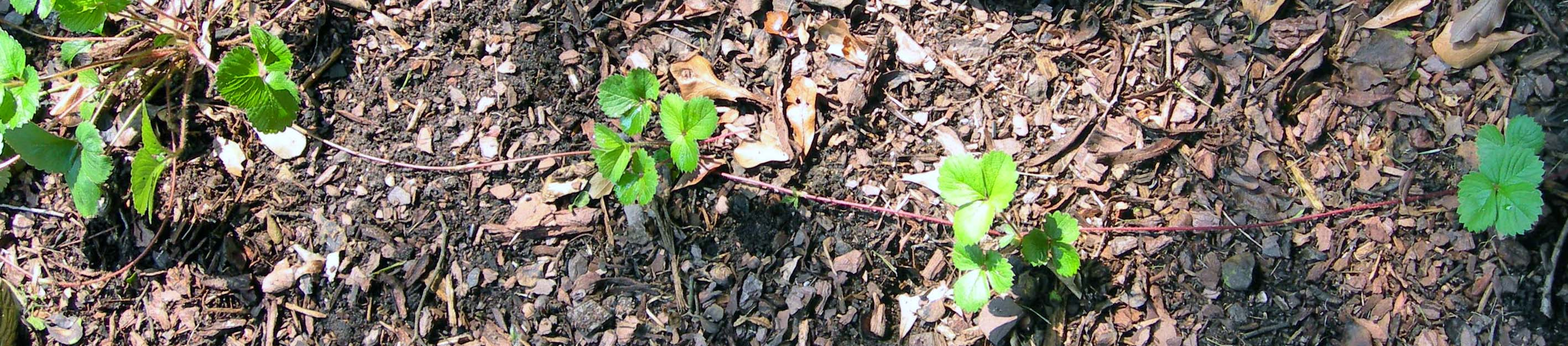
'Lipstick' hybrid strawberry (Comarum palustre × Fragaria × ananassa) using stolons to grow new plants

Also known as stolons, runners are modified stems that, unlike rhizomes, grow from existing stems just below the soil surface. As they are propagated, the buds on the modified stems produce roots and stems. Those buds are more separated than the ones found on the rhizome.

Examples of plants that use runners are strawberries and currants.

==== Bulbs ====
Bulbs are inflated parts of the stem within which lie the central shoots of new plants. They are typically underground and are surrounded by plump and layered leaves that provide nutrients to the new plant.

Examples of plants that use bulbs are shallots, lilies and tulips.

==== Tubers ====
Tubers develop from either the stem or the root. Stem tubers grow from rhizomes or runners that swell from storing nutrients while root tubers propagate from roots that are modified to store nutrients and get too large and produce a new plant.

Examples of stem tubers are potatoes and yams and examples of root tubers are sweet potatoes and dahlias.

==== Corms ====
Corms are solid enlarged underground stems that store nutrients in their fleshy and solid stem tissue and are surrounded by papery leaves. Corms differ from bulbs in that their centers consists of solid tissue while bulbs consist of layered leaves.

Examples of plants that use corms are gladiolus and taro.

==== Suckers ====
Also known as root sprouts, suckers are plant stems that arise from buds on the base of the parent plant's stems or roots.

Examples of plants that use suckers are apple, elm, and banana trees.

==== Plantlets ====
Plantlets are miniature structures that arise from meristem in leaf margins that eventually develops roots and drop from the leaves they grew on or on aerial stems.

Examples of plants that uses plantlets are the Kalanchoe daigremontiana, known as mother of thousands for its many plantlets, and the common houseplant hanging spider plant, producing "spiderettes".

==== Keikis ====
Keikis are additional offshoots which develop on vegetative stems or flower stalks of several orchids genera.

Examples of plants that use keikis are the Phalaenopsis, Epidendrum, and Dendrobium genera of orchids.

==== Apomixis ====
Apomixis is the process of asexual reproduction through seed, in the absence of meiosis and fertilization, generating clonal progeny of maternal origin.

=== Artificial means ===
Vegetative propagation of particular cultivars that have desirable characteristics is very common practice. It is used by farmers and horticulturalists to produce better crops with desirable qualities. The most common methods of artificial vegetative propagation are:

==== Cutting ====
A cutting is a part of the plant, usually a stem or a leaf, that is cut off and planted. Adventitious roots grow from cuttings and a new plant eventually develops. Usually those cuttings are treated with hormones before being planted to induce growth.

==== Grafting ====
Grafting involves attaching a scion, or a desired cutting, to the stem of another plant called stock that remains rooted in the ground. Eventually both tissue systems become grafted or integrated and a plant with the characteristics of the grafted plant develops, e.g. mango, guava, etc.

==== Layering ====
Layering is a process which includes the bending of plant branches or stems so that they touch the ground and are covered with soil. Adventitious roots develop from the underground part of the plant, which is known as the layer. This method of vegetative reproduction also occurs naturally. Another similar method, air layering, involved the scraping and replanting of tree branches which develop into trees. Examples are Jasmine and Bougainvillea.

==== Suckering ====
Suckers grow and form a dense compact mat that is attached to the parent plant. Too many suckers can lead to smaller crop size, so excess suckers are pruned, and mature suckers are transplanted to a new area where they develop into new plants.

==== Tissue culture ====
In tissue culture, plant cells are taken from various parts of the plant and are cultured and nurtured in a sterilized medium. The mass of developed tissue, known as the callus, is then cultured in a hormone-ladened medium and eventually develops into plantlets which are then planted and eventually develop into grown plants.

An offset is the lower part of a single culm with the rhizome axis basal to it and its roots. Planting of these is the most convenient way of propagating bamboo.

== See also ==
- Micropropagation
- Hemerochory
- Escaped plant
