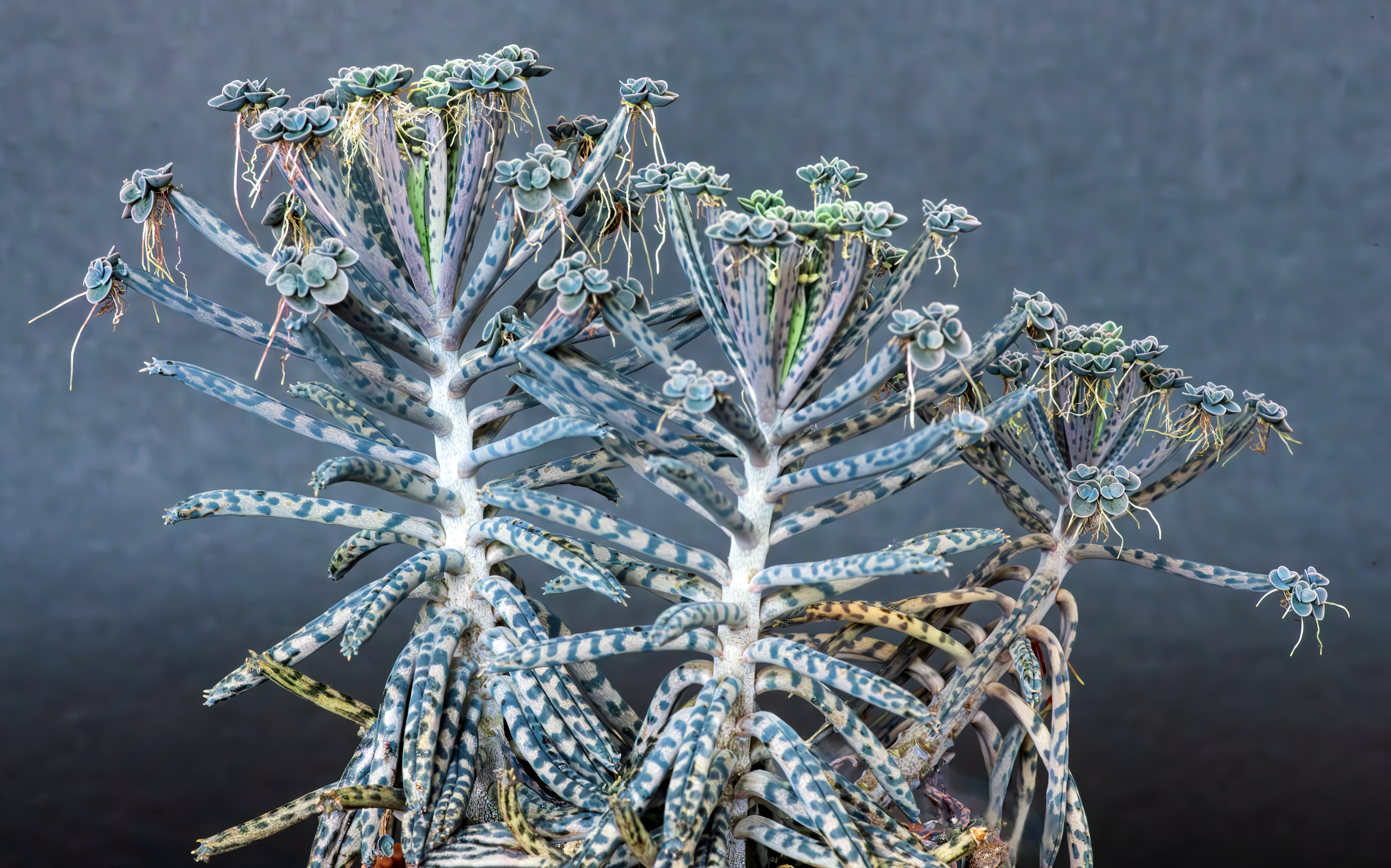
- It is able to propagate vegetatively from plantlets that develop on its leaf margins.

Scientific classification
- Kingdom: Plantae
- Clade: Tracheophytes
- Clade: Angiosperms
- Clade: Eudicots
- Order: Saxifragales
- Family: Crassulaceae
- Genus: Kalanchoe
- Species: K. delagoensis

Binomial name
- Kalanchoe delagoensis Eckl. & Zeyh.

Synonyms
- Bryophyllum delagoense (Eckl. & Zeyh.) Druce; Bryophyllum tubiflorum Harv.; Bryophyllum verticillatum (Scott Elliot) A.Berger; Geaya purpurea Costantin & Poiss.; Kalanchoe tubiflora (Harv.) Raym.-Hamet; Kalanchoe verticillata Scott Elliot; Gaalaamcoi delagoensis T

= Kalanchoe delagoensis =

Species of succulent

Kalanchoe delagoensis, formerly known as Bryophyllum delagoense and commonly called mother of millions or chandelier plant, is a succulent plant native to Madagascar. Like other members of Bryophyllum (now included in Kalanchoe), it is able to propagate vegetatively from plantlets that develop on its leaf margins.

== Description ==
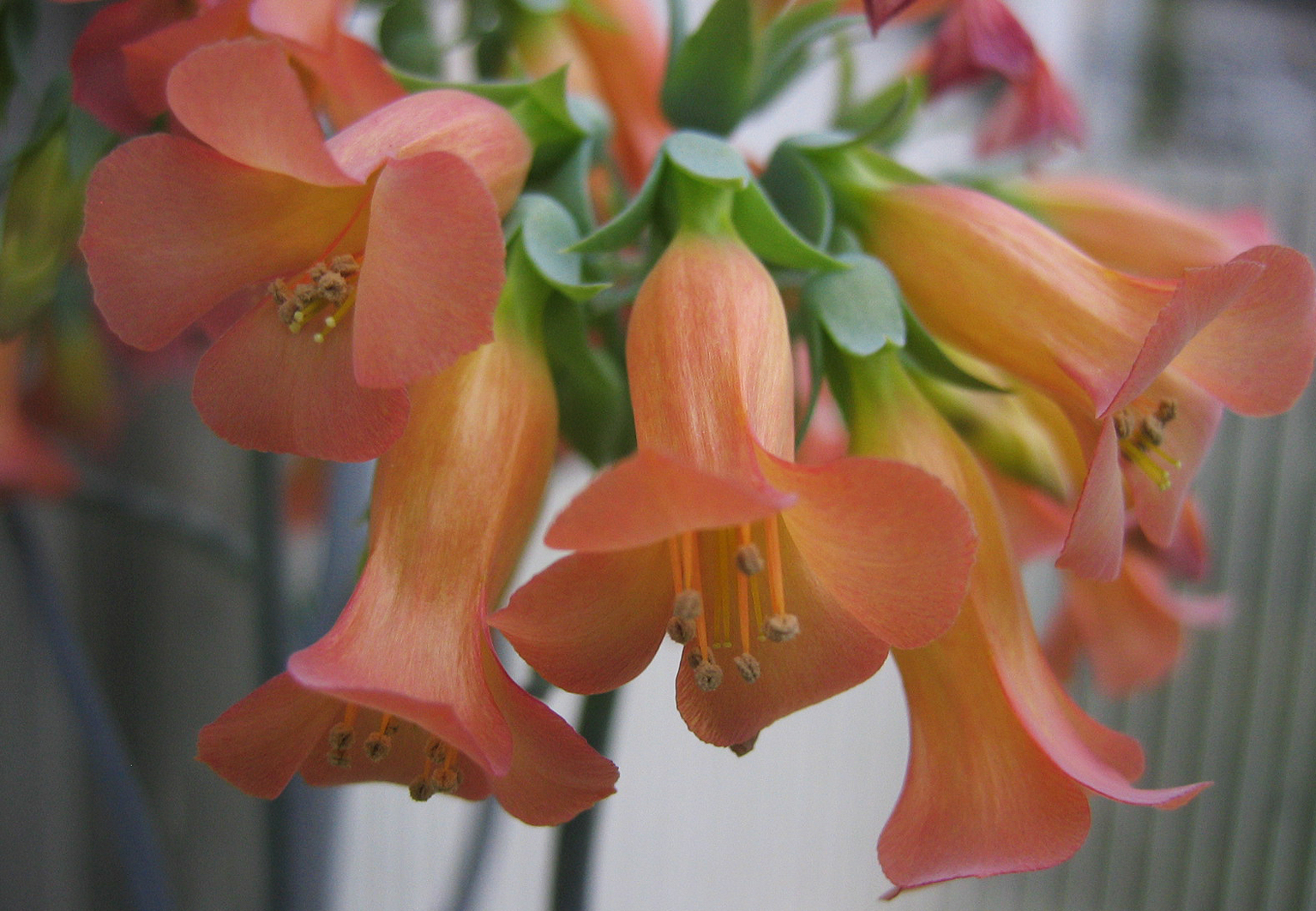
Flowers

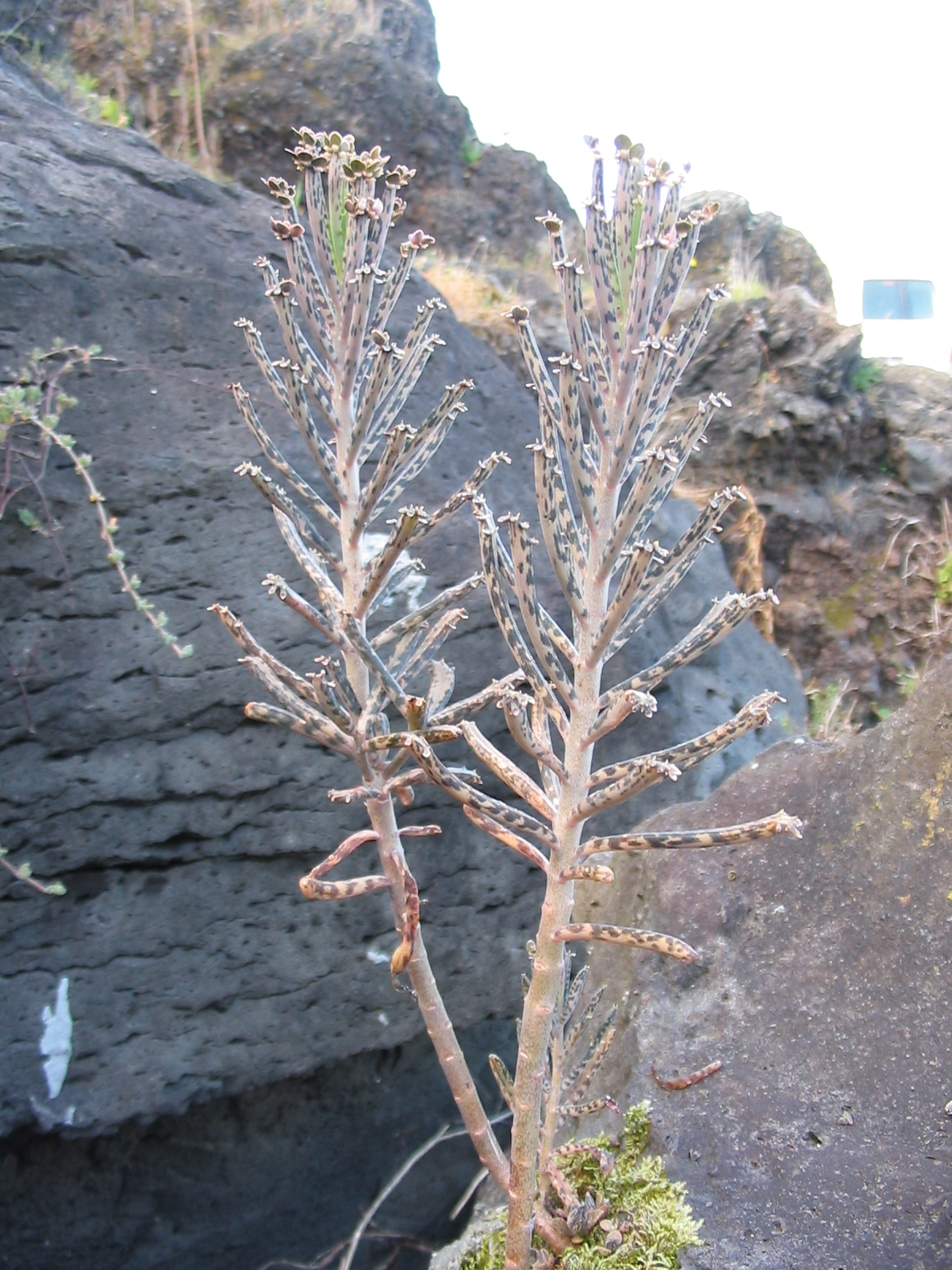
Habitus

It is a robust, completely bare, biennial or more or less perennial, succulent plant that reaches heights of between 0.2 and 2 meters. The upright stems are simple and round. The three-seated, seemingly opposite or alternate leaves are usually upright to straight when spread out. They are slightly cylindrical, a little rutty on the top and reach a length of 1 to 13 centimeters with a diameter of 2 to 6 millimeters. The leaf blade narrowed at the base is reddish-green to gray-green with reddish brown spots. At the tip of the leaf margin there are two to nine small teeth on which there are numerous brood buds.

=== Inflorescences ===
The compact, multi-flowered inflorescences form thyrses 10 to 25 centimeters long. The slender flower stalk is between 6 and 20 millimeters long. The hermaphrodite flowers are hanging. The reddish to green and red-striped petals are fused together like a bell. The 2.5 to 6 millimeter long corolla tube ends in sharply pointed, triangular-lanceolate corolla lobes 5 to 10 millimeters long and 3.7 to 5.7 millimeters wide. The stamens are attached below the center of the corolla tube and do not protrude beyond the tube. The 2 to 2.5 millimeters large anthers are egg-shaped. The nectar flakes, 0.7 to 2 centimeters long are half-round to square with a rounded tip. The oval-elongated carpel is 5.5 to 6.5 millimeters long. The stylus has a length of about 2 millimeters.

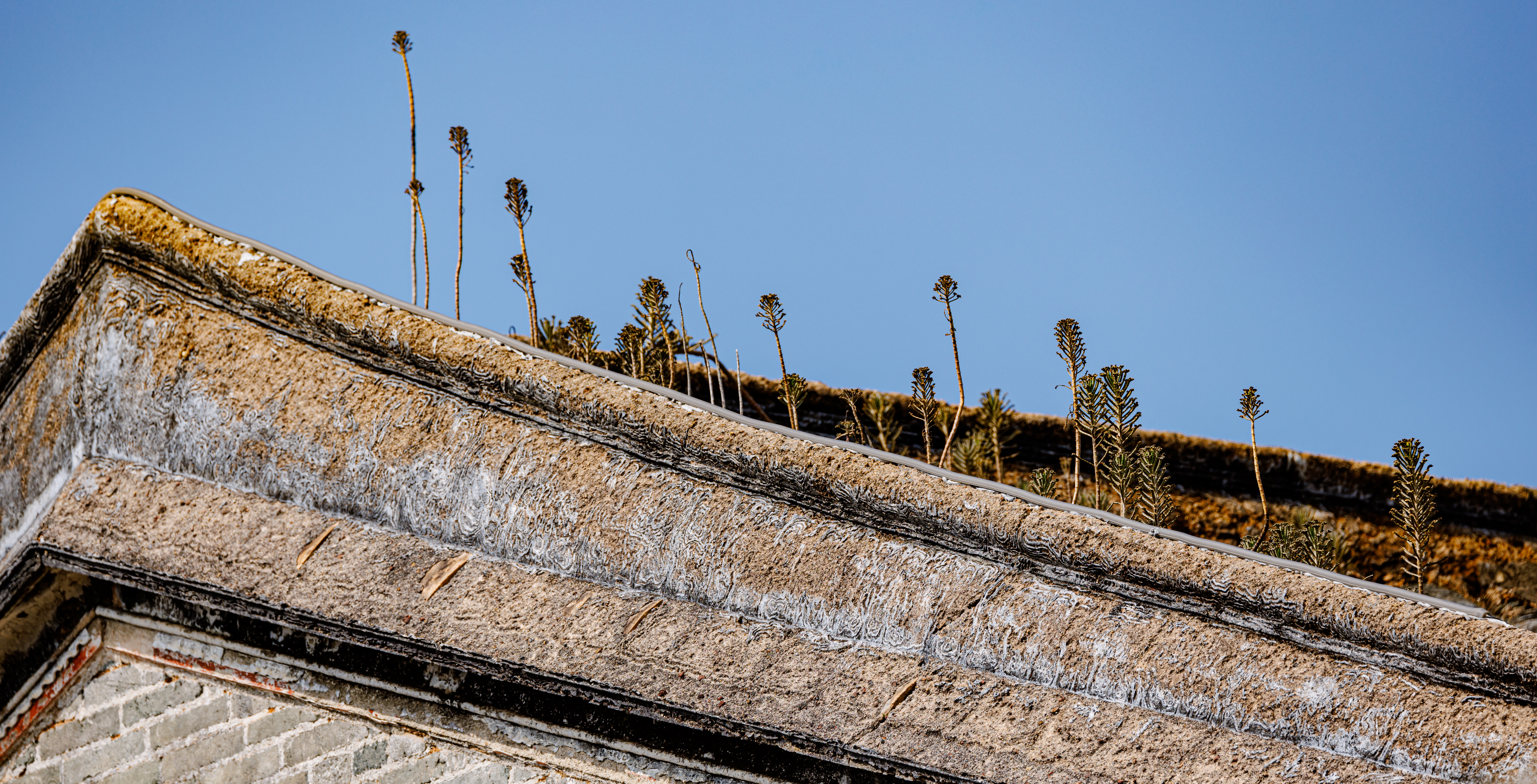
Kalanchoe delagoensis in Dapeng Fortress, Shenzhen

The upright follicles contain seeds with a diameter of 0.6 to 2.5 millimeters.

== Invasive species ==
This species' capability for vegetative reproduction, its drought tolerance, and its popularity as a garden plant, relate to this species' becoming an invasive weed in places such as eastern Australia, South Africa and many Pacific islands. In the Neotropics hummingbirds sometimes pollinate this non-native plant.

Kalanchoe delagoensis is unwelcome because it displaces native plants and contains bufadienolide cardiac glycosides which can cause fatal poisoning, particularly in grazing animals like cattle. During 1997, 125 head of cattle died after eating this species on a travelling stock reserve near Moree, NSW.

In the Australian states of New South Wales and Queensland, this species and its hybrids have been declared a noxious weed.

== See also ==
- List of poisonous plants
- List of plants known as mother of thousands
