= Spider plant =

Spider plant is a common name for several plants and may refer to:

- Chlorophytum comosum, the commonly cultivated houseplant
- Chlorophytum, a genus of plants in the asparagus family
- Saxifraga flagellaris, also known as whiplash saxifrage
- Cleome, a genus of flowering plants
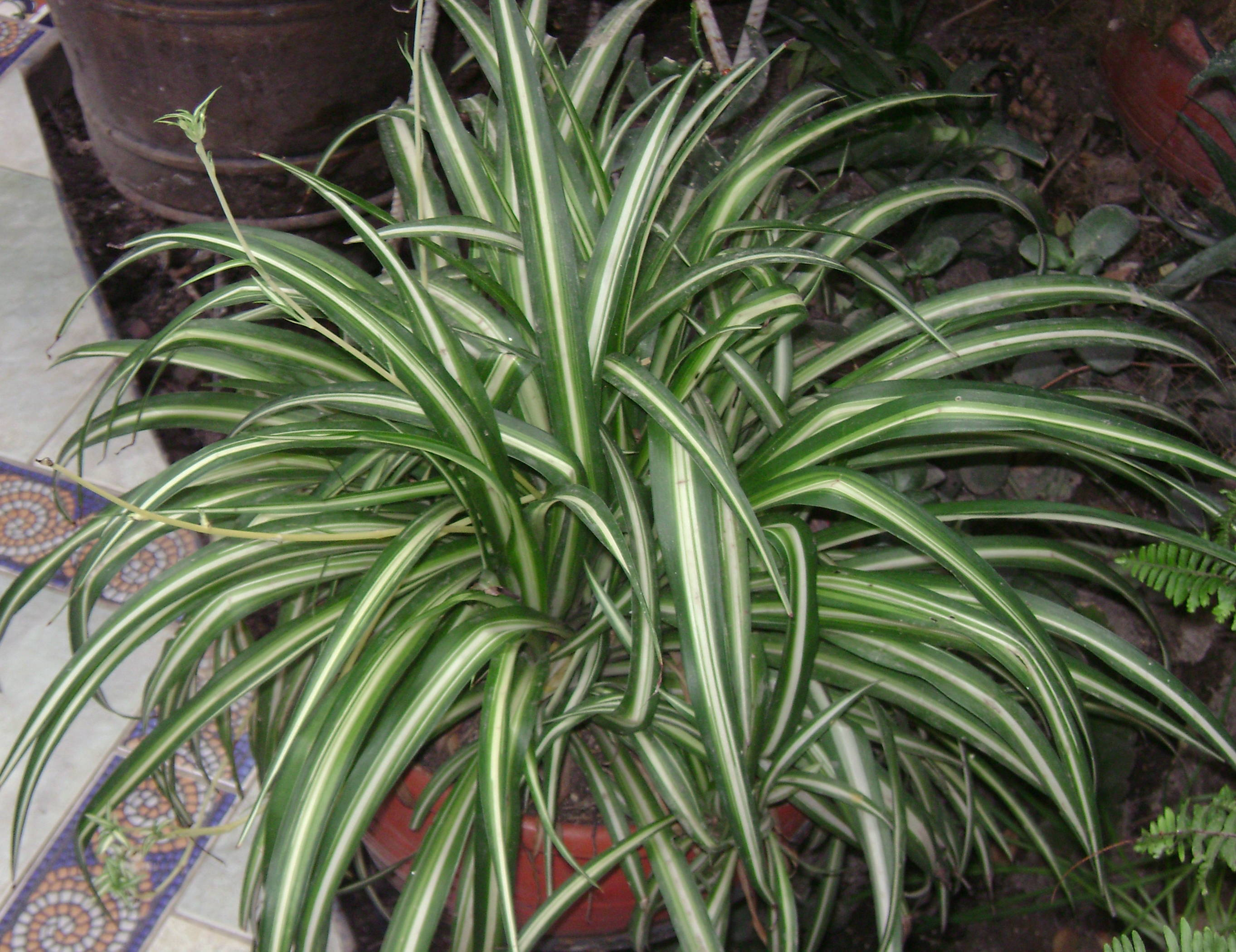
Chlorophytum comosum

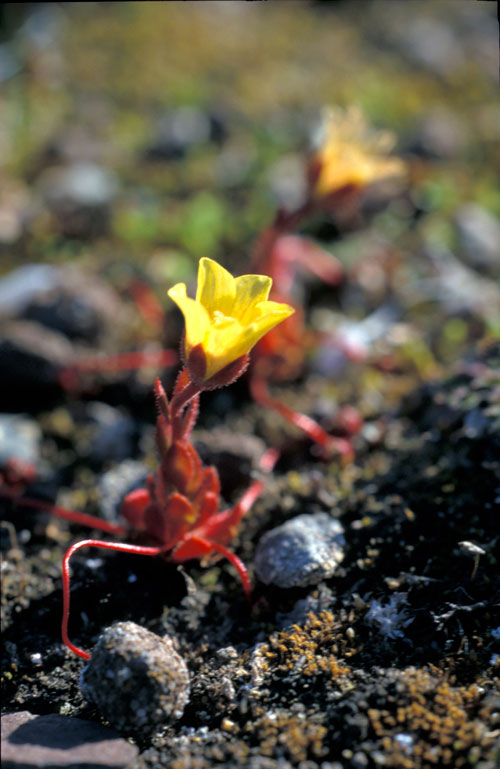
Saxifraga flagellaris

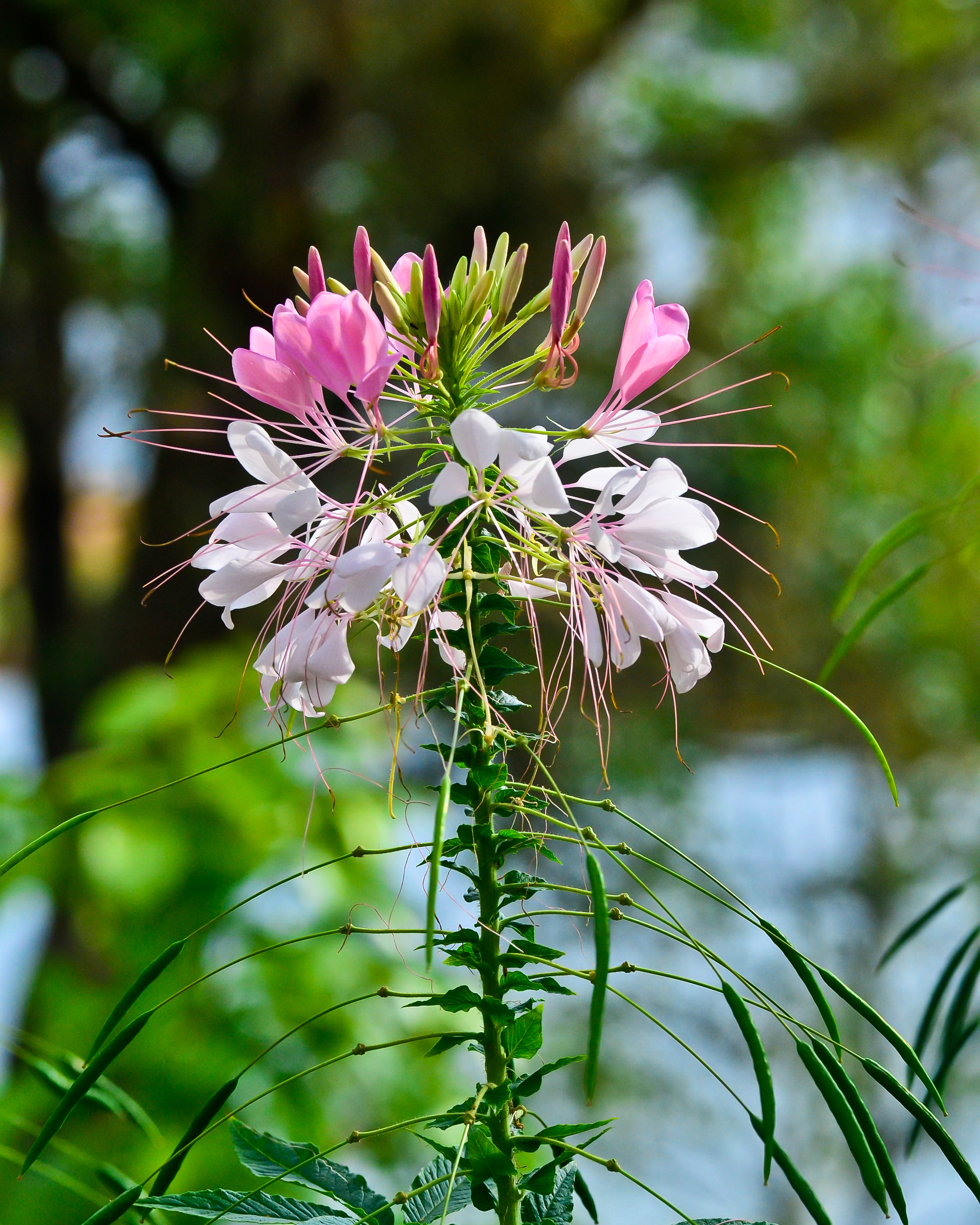
Cleome
