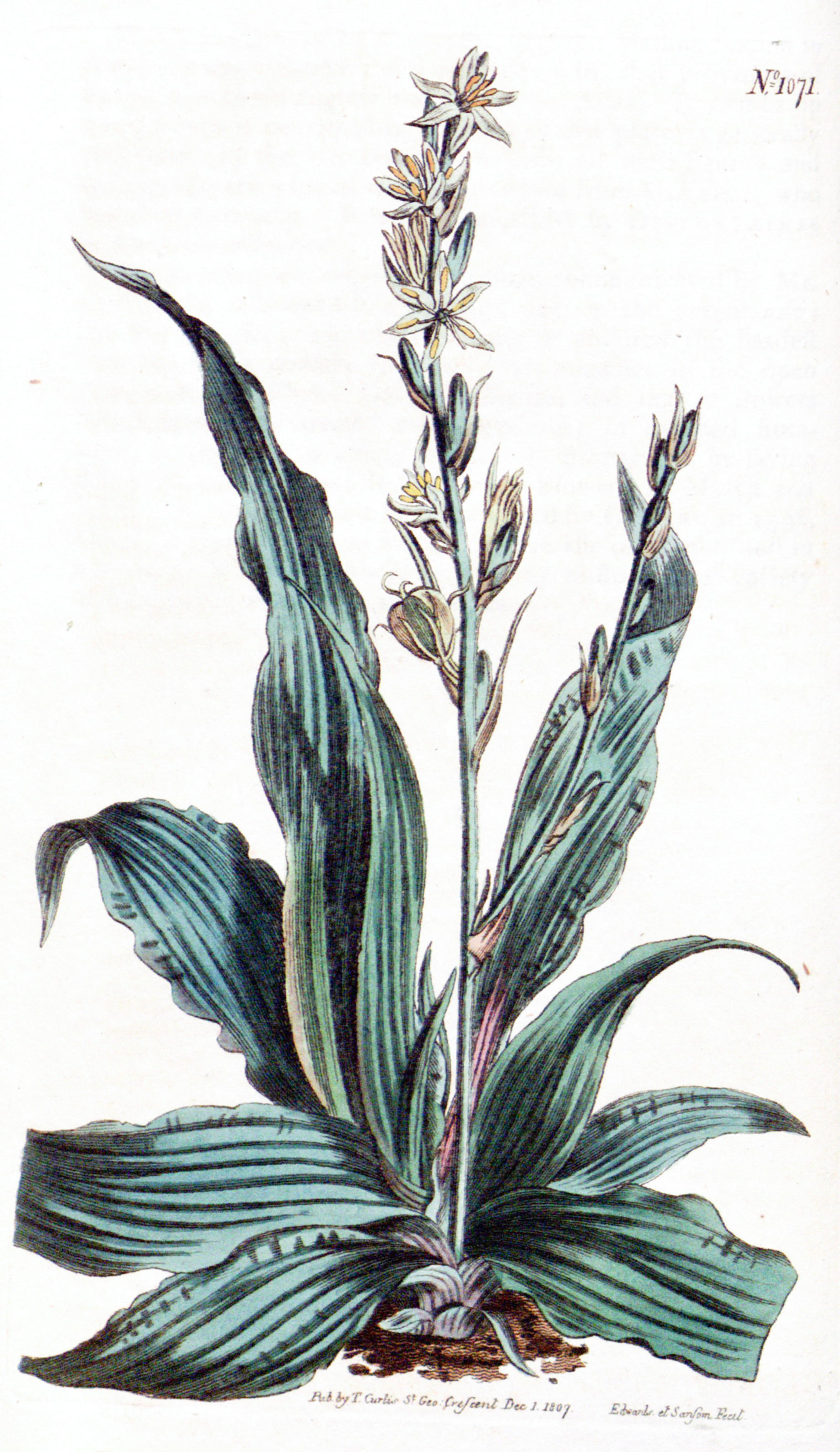
- Chlorophytum inornatum, Curtis's Botanical Magazine. Volume 27, 1807, Plate 1071

Scientific classification
- Kingdom: Plantae
- Clade: Embryophytes
- Clade: Tracheophytes
- Clade: Angiosperms
- Clade: Monocots
- Order: Asparagales
- Family: Asparagaceae
- Subfamily: Agavoideae
- Genus: Chlorophytum
- Species: C. inornatum

Binomial name
- Chlorophytum inornatum Ker Gawl. 1807

= Chlorophytum inornatum =

Species of flowering plant

Chlorophytum inornatum is a flowering plant species in the genus Chlorophytum. It is the type species of its genus. It is related to the commonly known houseplant Chlorophytum comosum also referred to as a "spider plant". 3-(4'-Methoxybenzyl)-7,8-methylenedioxy-chroman-4-one, a homoisoflavanone with antimycobacterial activity, can be isolated from C. inornatum.
