= Dasystachys =

Dasystachys is a taxonomic synonym for two genera of plants:

- Dasystachys Oerst., a synonym of Chamaedorea Willd.
- Dasystachys Baker, a synonym of Chlorophytum Ker Gawl.
