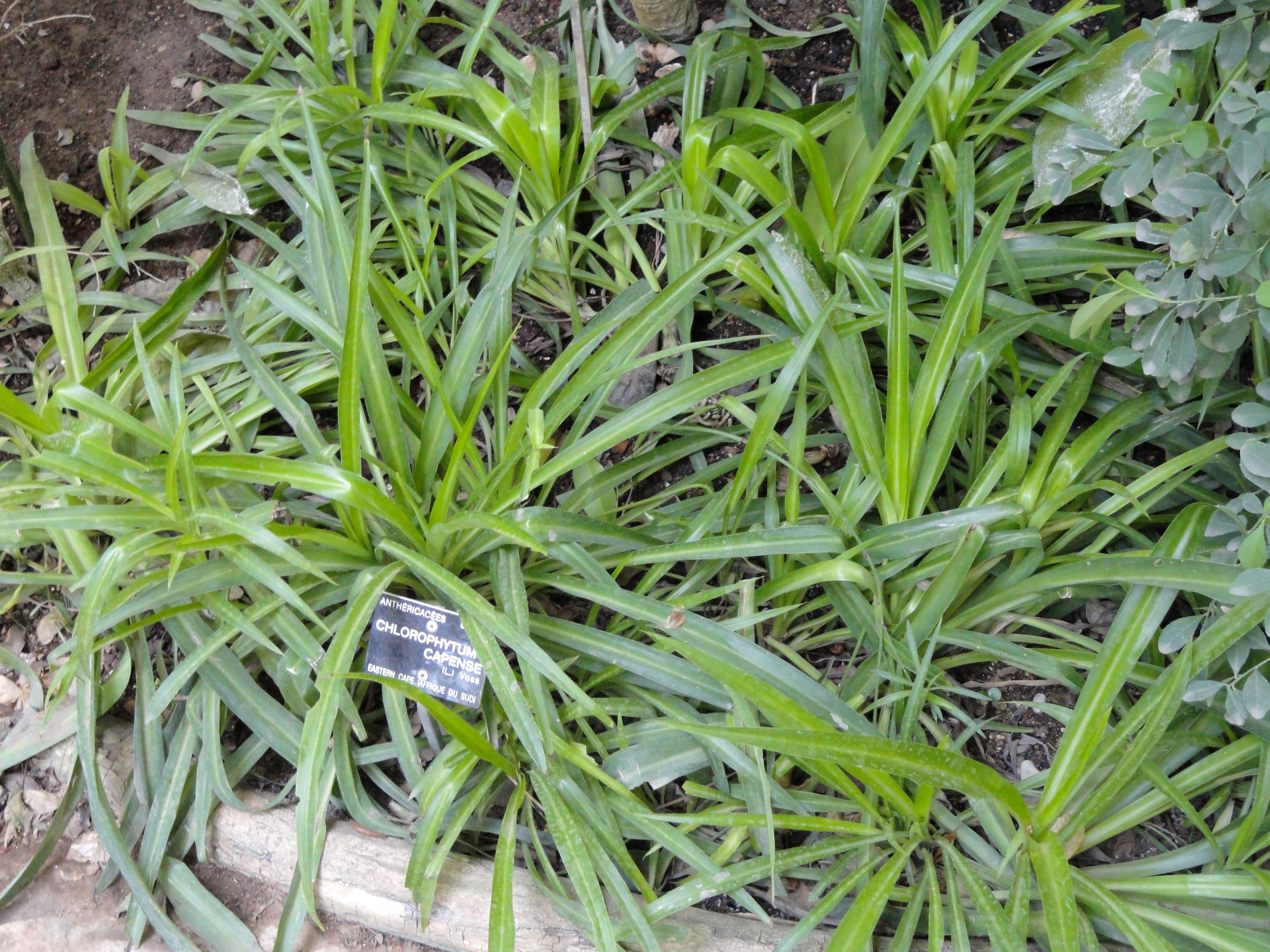
- At the Jardin botanique de Lyon
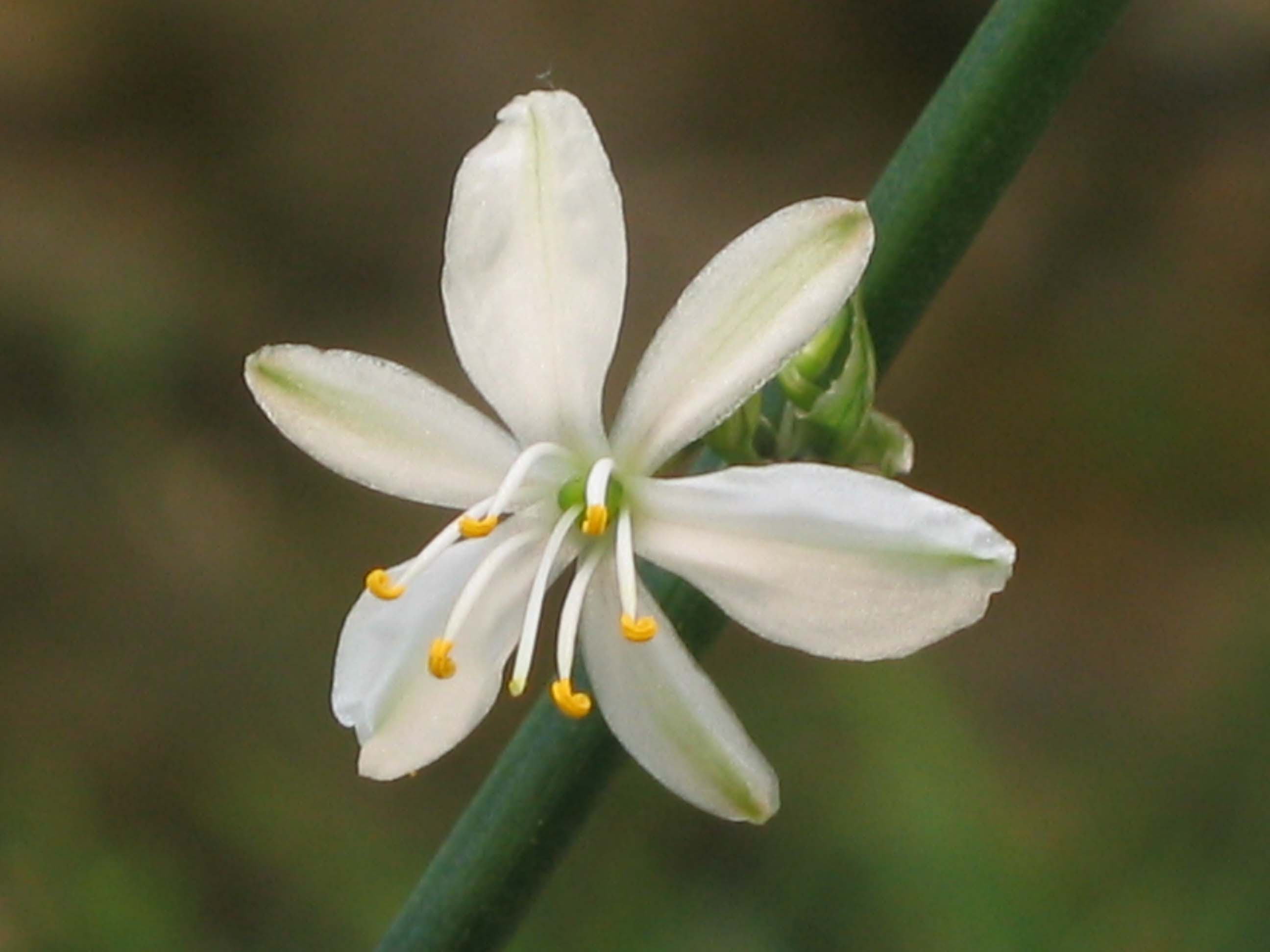
- Close-up of flower

Scientific classification
- Kingdom: Plantae
- Clade: Embryophytes
- Clade: Tracheophytes
- Clade: Angiosperms
- Clade: Monocots
- Order: Asparagales
- Family: Asparagaceae
- Subfamily: Agavoideae
- Genus: Chlorophytum
- Species: C. capense

Binomial name
- Chlorophytum capense (L.) Voss

Synonyms
- List: Anthericum elatum Aiton; Anthericum fastigiatum (Poir.) F.Dietr.; Anthericum rouwenortii Gorter; Anthericum variegatum W.G.Sm.; Asphodelus capensis L.; Chlorophytum elatum (Aiton) R.Br. ex Ker Gawl.; Phalangium elatum (Aiton) Poir.; Phalangium fasciculatum Baker; Phalangium fastigiatum Poir.; Phalangium variegatum Baker

= Chlorophytum capense =

Species of plant

Chlorophytum capense, the bracketplant or Cape spider plant, is a species of flowering plant in the family Asparagaceae. It is native to the eastern Cape Provinces of South Africa, and it has been introduced to Mexico, the Azores, Madeira, Bangladesh, and Myanmar. A rhizomatous perennial reaching 60 cm (24 in), it has found use as an ornamental, both in landscaping and as a houseplant. It is often confused with the common spider plant Chlorophytum comosum, but does not produce its characteristic hanging plantlets.

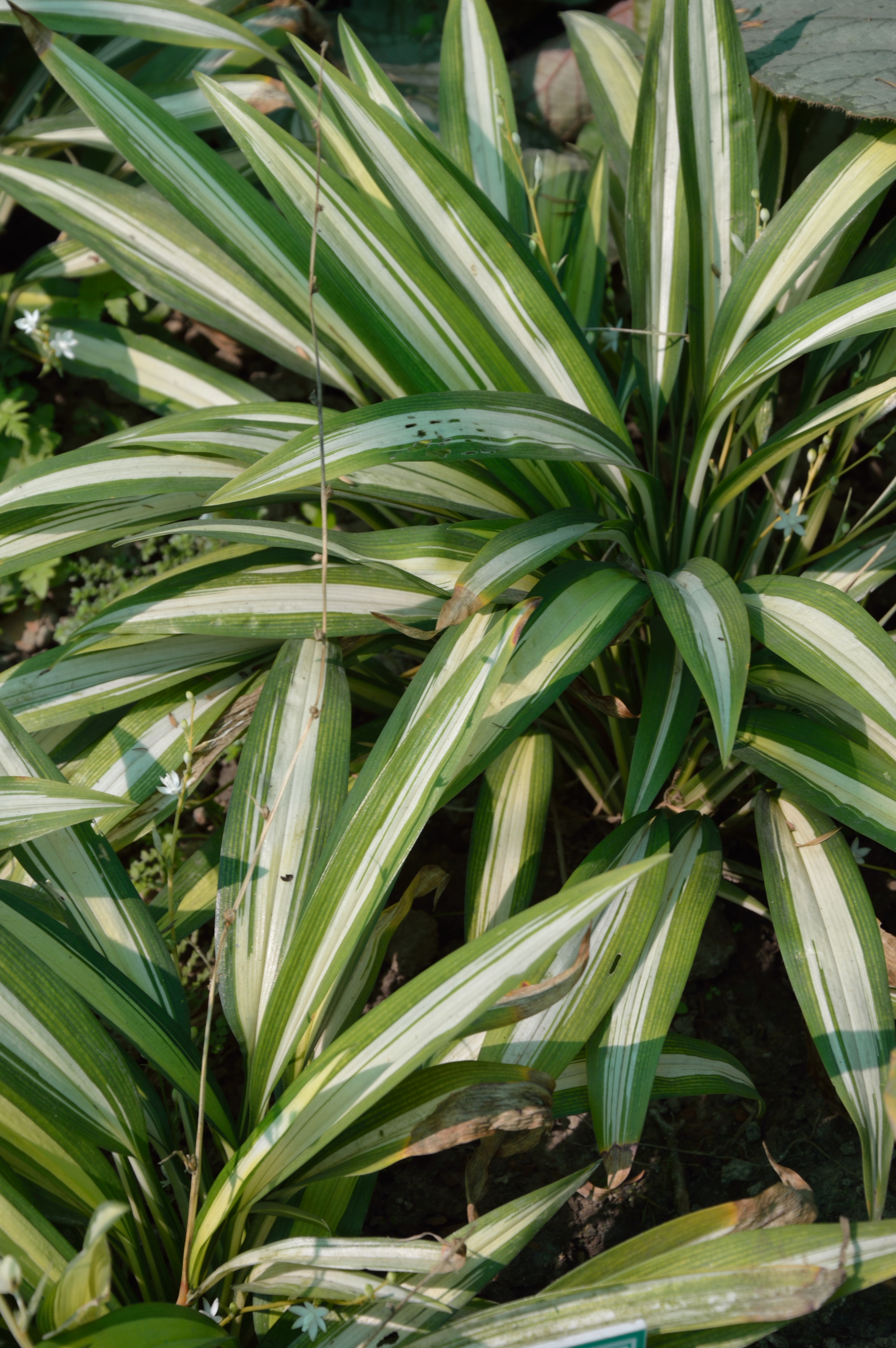
A variegated cultivar
