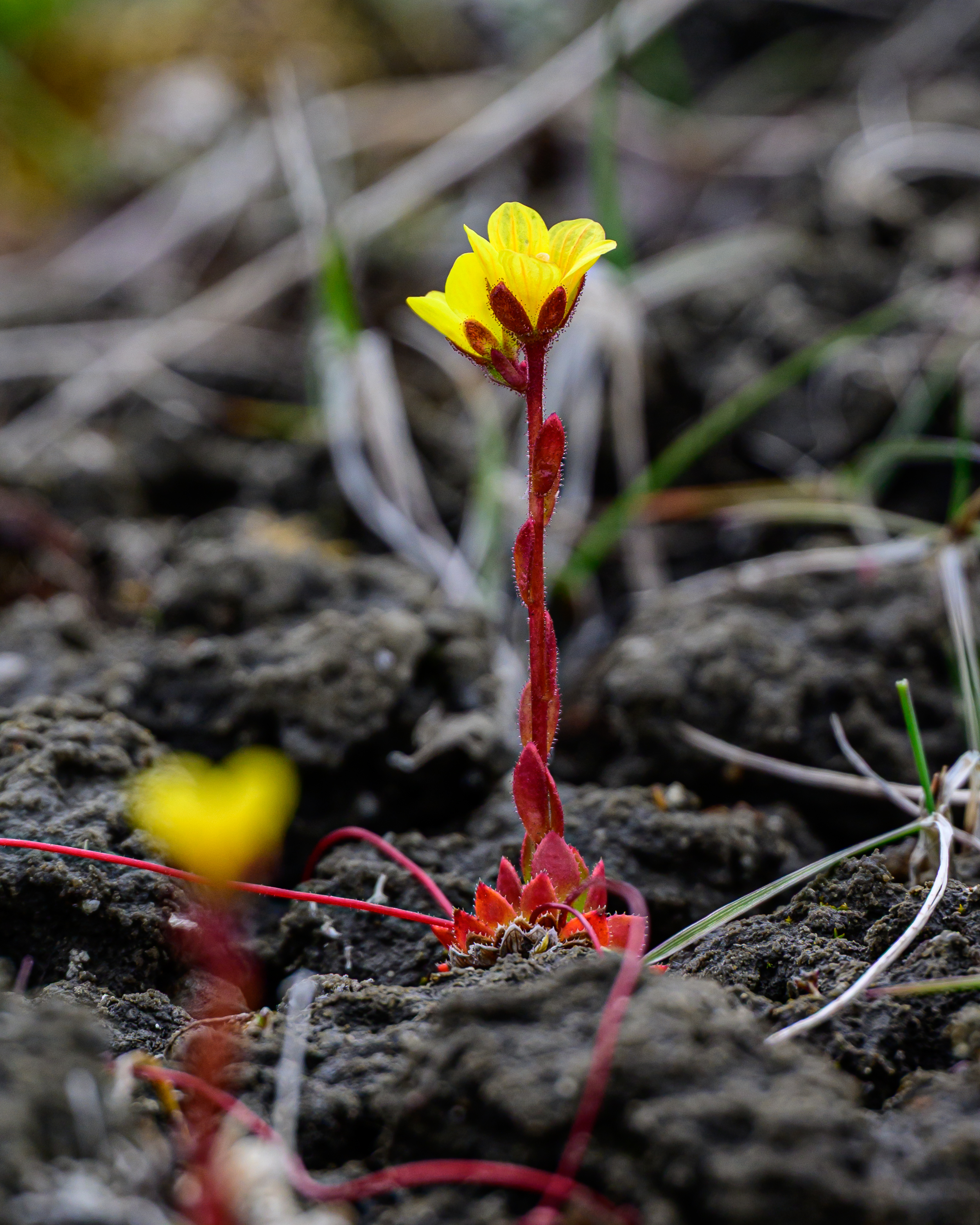
- Saxifraga flagellaris flowering stem

Scientific classification
- Kingdom: Plantae
- Clade: Embryophytes
- Clade: Tracheophytes
- Clade: Spermatophytes
- Clade: Angiosperms
- Clade: Eudicots
- Order: Saxifragales
- Family: Saxifragaceae
- Genus: Saxifraga
- Species: S. flagellaris

Binomial name
- Saxifraga flagellaris Willd. ex Sternb.

= Saxifraga flagellaris =

Species of flowering plant

Saxifraga flagellaris, the whiplash saxifrage or flagellate saxifrage, is a plant native all over the Eurasian Arctic Coast, Siberia, Far East, Caucasus and some areas of northern Rocky Mountains. It is not very common. It is also known as spider saxifrage or "spider plant", though the latter name more commonly refers to the unrelated Chlorophytum comosum (Agavaceae).

The broadsepal saxifrage (S. platysepala) was formerly included in the present species, then made a separate species, and later again made a subspecies, Saxifraga flagellaris ssp. platysepala—broadsepal saxifrage (http://www.cbif.gc.ca/pls/itisca/next?v_tsn=24270&taxa=&p_format=&p_ifx=&p_lang=). The species found in Greenland, Svalbard, Alaska etc. is Saxifraga flagellaris ssp. platysepala—broadsepal saxifrage.

The stems are single, erect and leafy, growing to 3–10 cm (1.2–3.9 in) tall. The basal leaves in a dense rosette from which long, filiform runners radiate ending in a small, rooting offset; they also have glandular hairs on the margins. Each stem usually has one terminal flower, rarely two, with golden yellow petals, much longer than the calyx lobes. The whole plant is more or less red. It grows in moist places, on gravel or in moss carpets.

It is not in any danger of extinction, but is yet very rare.

Saxifraga flagellaris was described by Willdenow. Other authors often used the name for Saxifraga platysepala (broadsepal saxifrage).

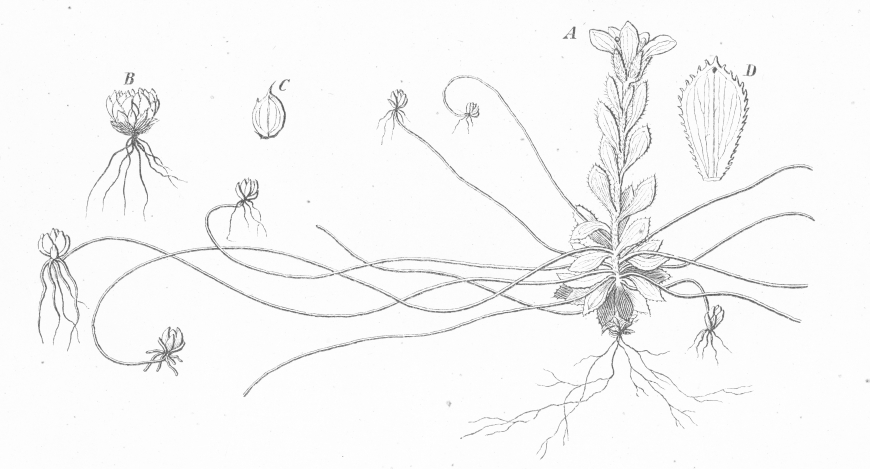
Saxifraga flagellaris ssp. platysepala: A flowering plant with some of its runners, a leaf from a layer rosettea leaf from the flowering stem (Warming 1884)
