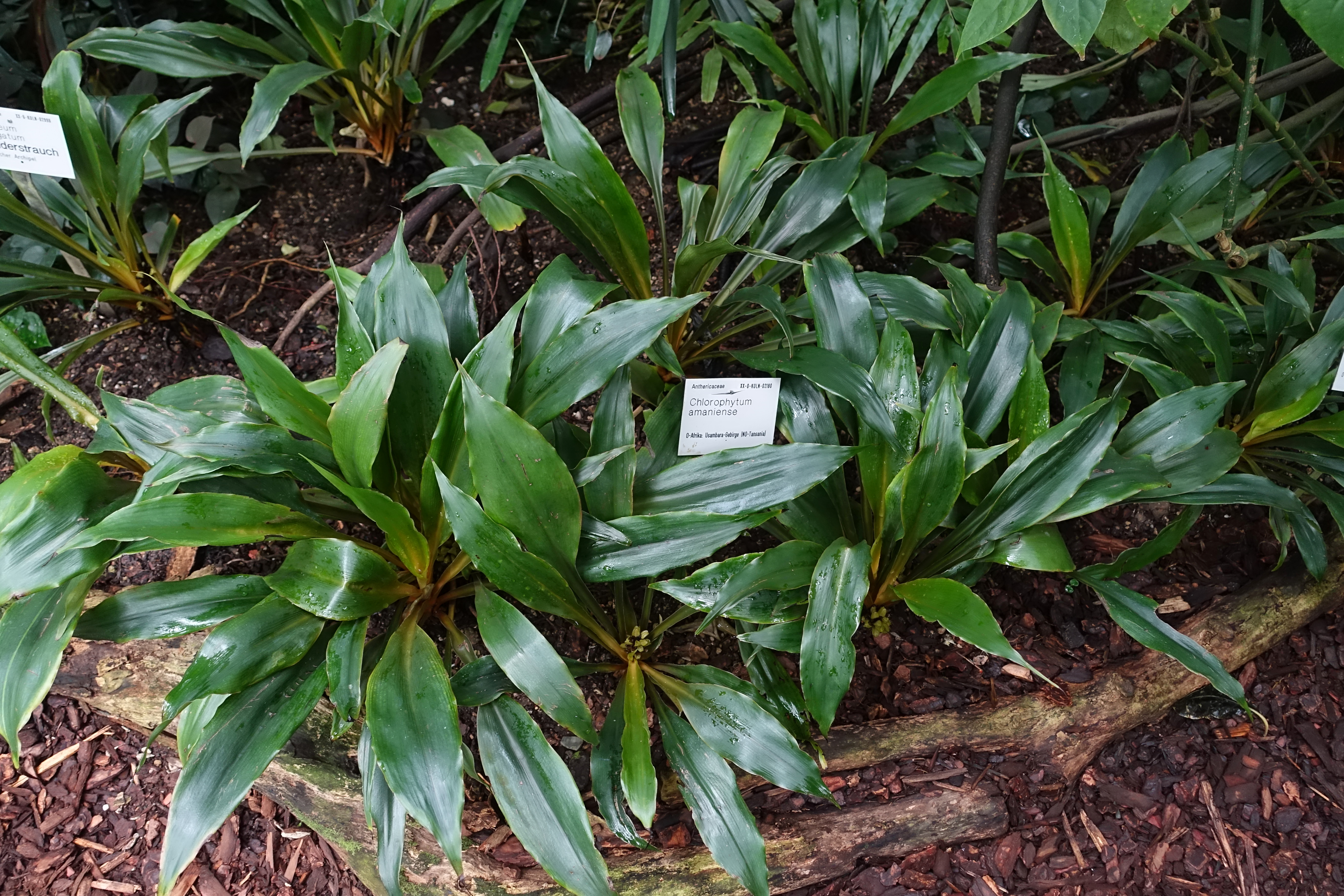
- Chlorophytum filipendulum subsp. amaniense (Engl.) Nordal & A.D.Poulsen

Conservation status
- Least Concern (IUCN 3.1)

Scientific classification
- Kingdom: Plantae
- Clade: Embryophytes
- Clade: Tracheophytes
- Clade: Angiosperms
- Clade: Monocots
- Order: Asparagales
- Family: Asparagaceae
- Subfamily: Agavoideae
- Genus: Chlorophytum
- Species: C. filipendulum

Binomial name
- Chlorophytum filipendulum Baker

= Chlorophytum filipendulum =

Species of flowering plant

Chlorophytum filipendulum is a species of flowering plant in the Asparagaceae family. It is native to a variety of habitats across large areas of Equatorial Africa.
