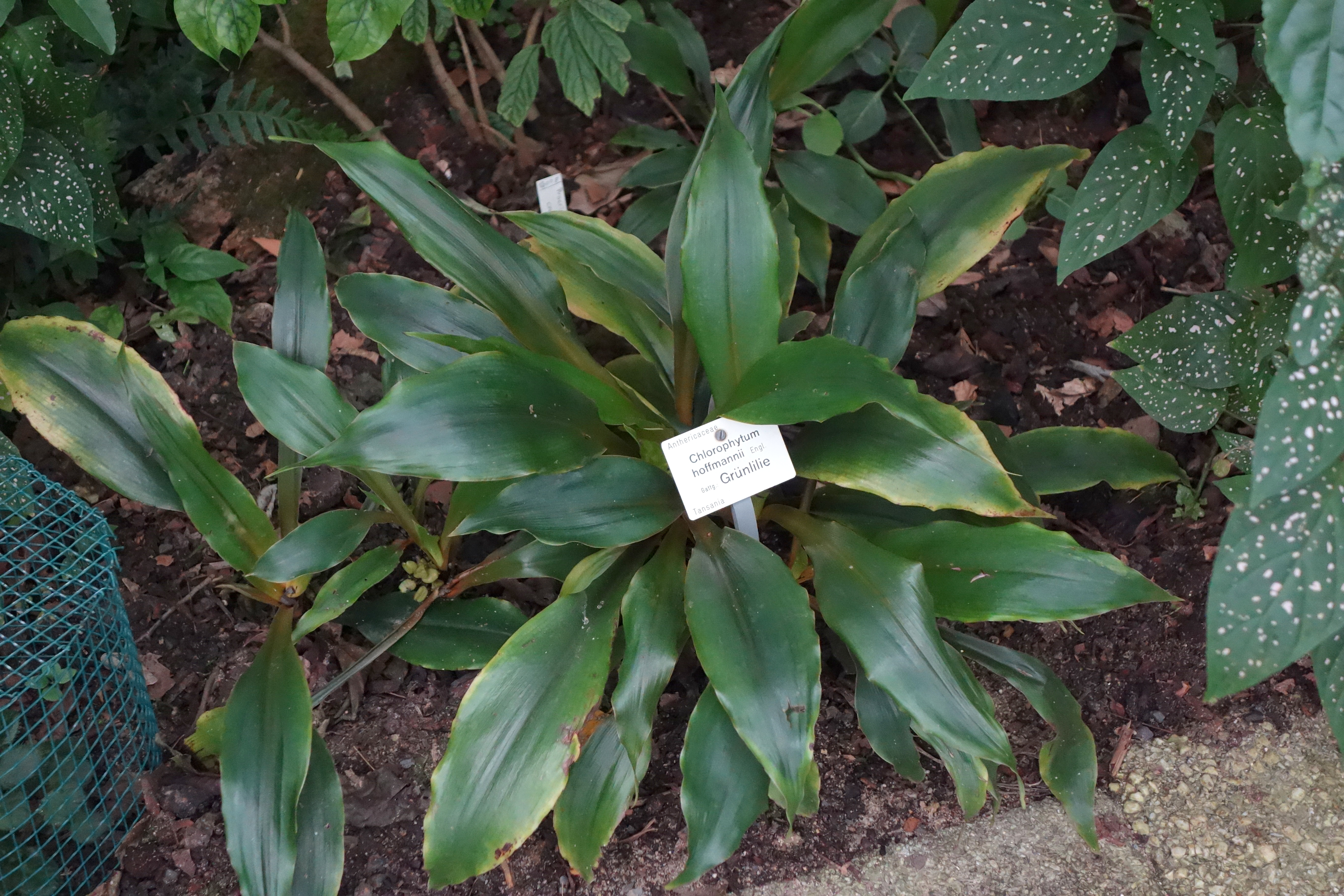

Conservation status
- Least Concern (IUCN 3.1)

Scientific classification
- Kingdom: Plantae
- Clade: Embryophytes
- Clade: Tracheophytes
- Clade: Angiosperms
- Clade: Monocots
- Order: Asparagales
- Family: Asparagaceae
- Subfamily: Agavoideae
- Genus: Chlorophytum
- Species: C. holstii

Binomial name
- Chlorophytum holstii Engl.

Synonyms
- Chlorophytum hoffmannii Engl.; Chlorophytum holstii var. glabrum Poelln.; Chlorophytum pulverulentum Peter ex Poelln.; Chlorophytum uvinsense Poelln.

= Chlorophytum holstii =

Species of flowering plant

Chlorophytum holstii is a flowering plant species in the genus Chlorophytum, endemic to Tanzania and Kenya.
