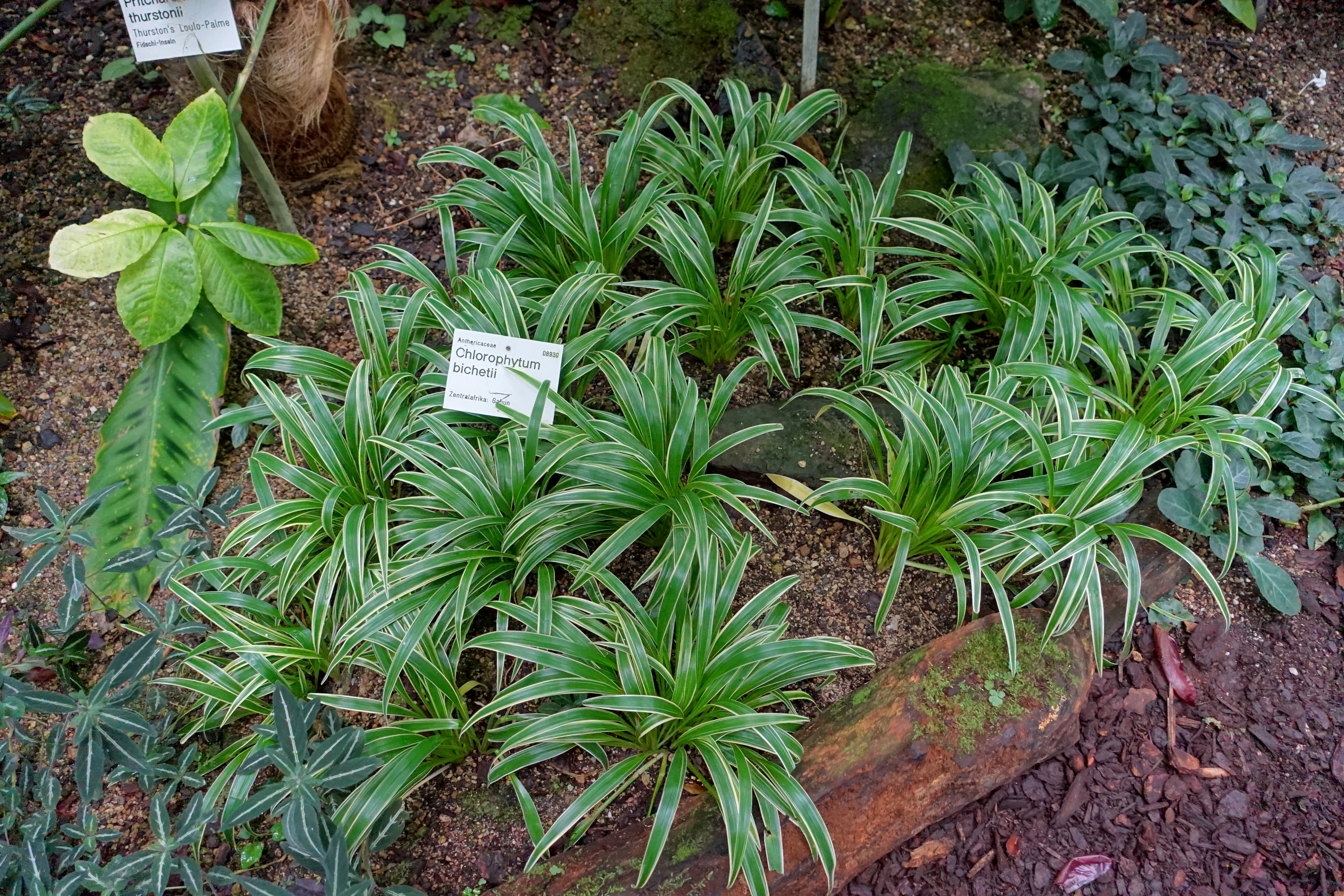

Scientific classification
- Kingdom: Plantae
- Clade: Embryophytes
- Clade: Tracheophytes
- Clade: Angiosperms
- Clade: Monocots
- Order: Asparagales
- Family: Asparagaceae
- Subfamily: Agavoideae
- Genus: Chlorophytum
- Species: C. laxum

Binomial name
- Chlorophytum laxum R.Br.

= Chlorophytum laxum =

Species of flowering plant

Chlorophytum laxum (Bichetii grass, Siam lily, false lily turf, wheat plant) is a flowering plant species in the genus Chlorophytum, widespread through tropical Africa, Asia, and Australia.

== Taxonomy ==
=== Synonyms ===
- Anthericum bichetii Backer
- Anthericum parviflorum (Wight) Benth.
- Chlorophytum abyssinicum Kotschy & Peyr.
- Chlorophytum acaule Baker
- Chlorophytum bichetii Backer
- Chlorophytum debile Baker
- Chlorophytum falcatum Baker
- Chlorophytum javanicum (Hassk.) M.R.Almeida
- Chlorophytum laxiflorum Baker
- Chlorophytum laxum f. javanicum (Hassk.) Backer
- Chlorophytum parviflorum Dalzell
- Chlorophytum xerotinum F.Muell.
- Nolina javanica Hassk.
- Phalangium laxum (R.Br.) F.Muell.
- Phalangium parviflorum Wight
