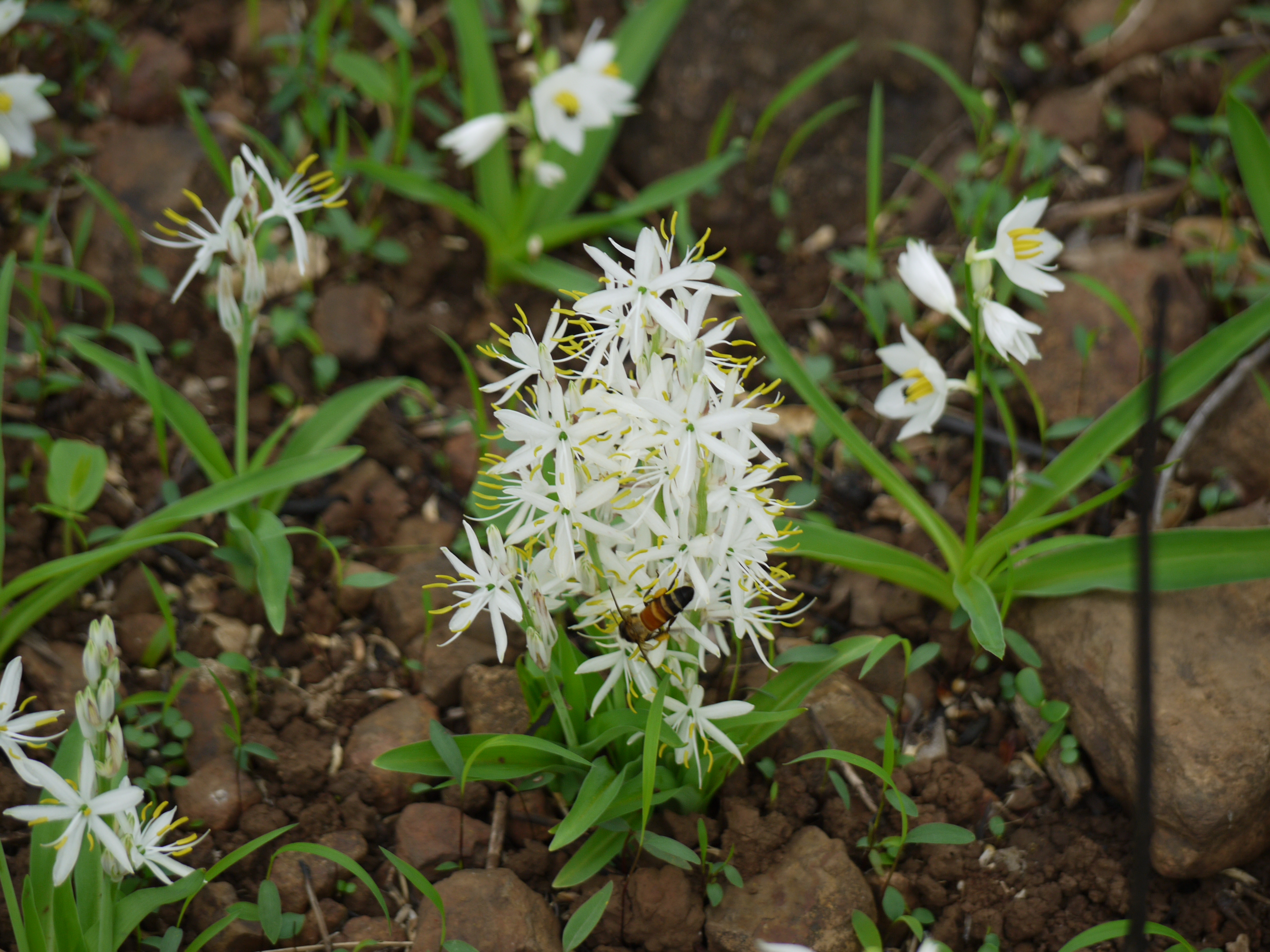

Conservation status
- Critically Endangered (IUCN 3.1)

Scientific classification
- Kingdom: Plantae
- Clade: Tracheophytes
- Clade: Angiosperms
- Clade: Monocots
- Order: Asparagales
- Family: Asparagaceae
- Subfamily: Agavoideae
- Genus: Chlorophytum
- Species: C. borivilianum

Binomial name
- Chlorophytum borivilianum Santapau & R.R.Fern.

= Chlorophytum borivilianum =

Species of flowering plant from India

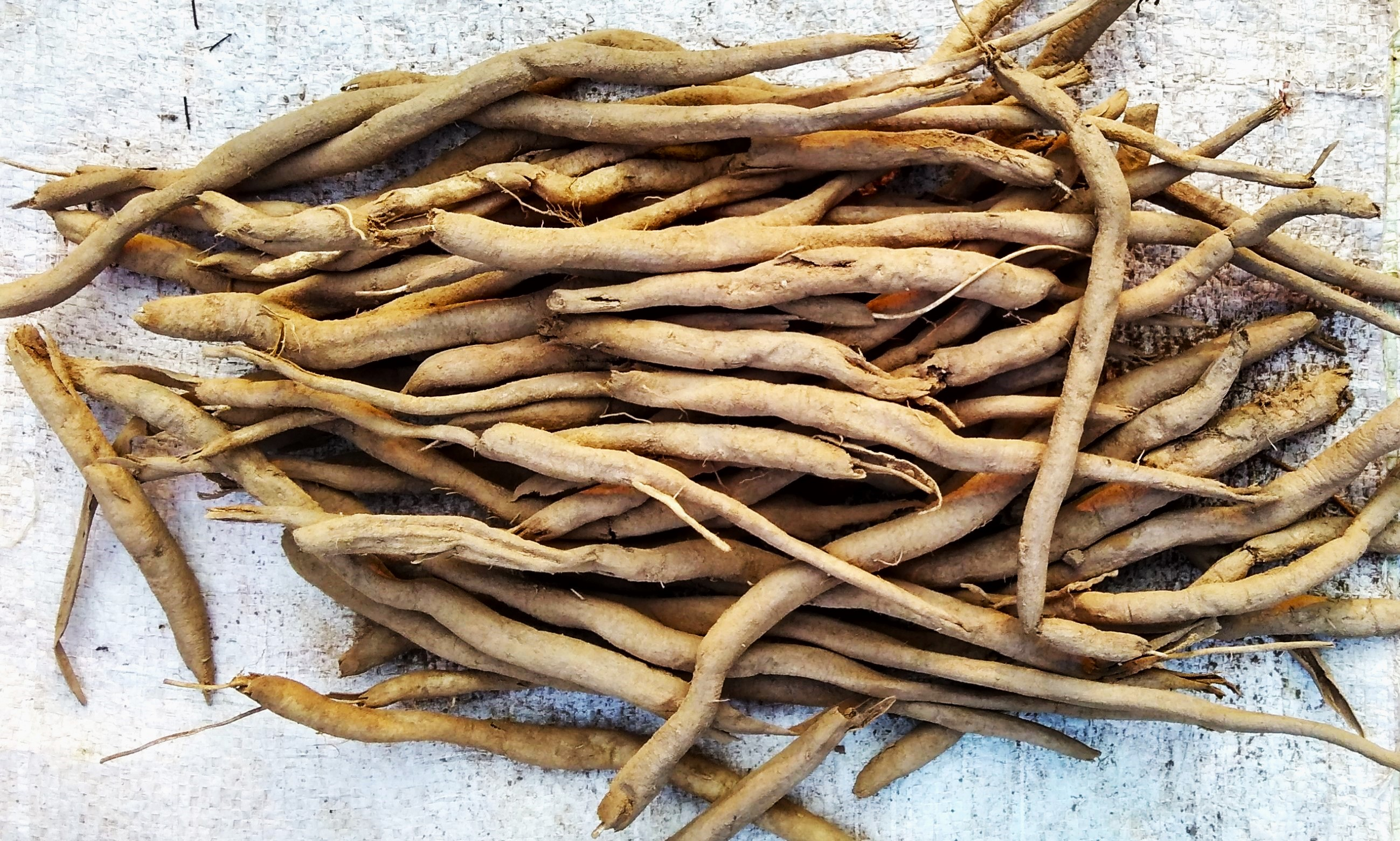
Dried tubers

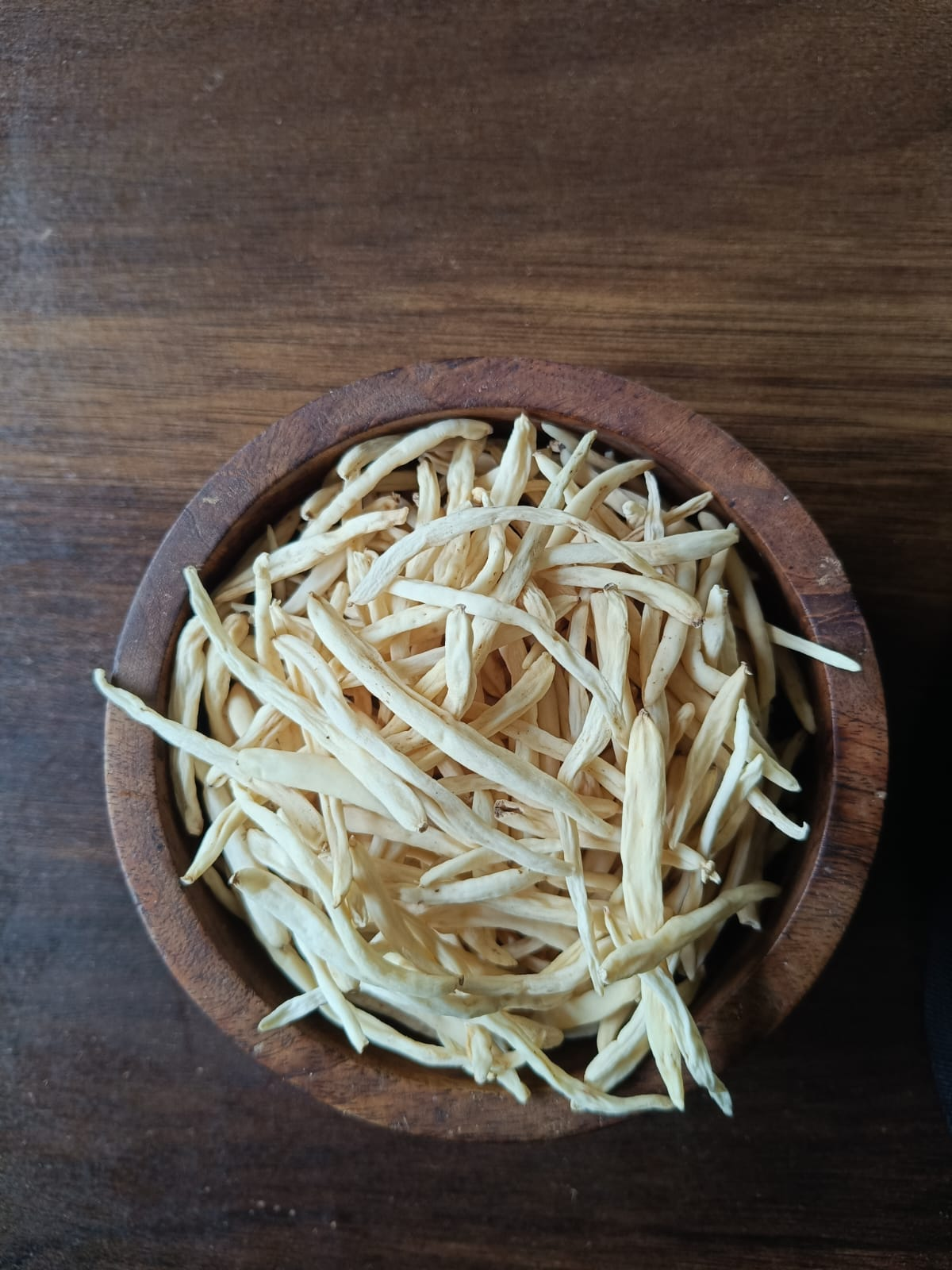
Roots, dried and prepared for medicinal use, cultivated in Gujarat, India

Chlorophytum borivilianum is a herb with lanceolate leaves, from tropical wet forests in the Peninsular Indian region.

It is cultivated and eaten as a leaf vegetable in some parts of India, and its roots are used as a health tonic under the name safed musli. In traditional Indian medicine, it is used as rasayan or adaptogen. It is considered a white gold in Indian systems of medicine. This herb belongs to the vajikaran rasayana group in Ayurveda.

It is commonly known by various vernacular names in India such as safed musli (Hindi), swetha musli (Kannada), tella nela tadi (Telugu), taniravi thang (Tamil), Dholi Musli (Gujarati) and khairuwa (Chhattisgarhi).

== Cultivation ==
Safed musli is cultivated in several Indian states including Madhya Pradesh, Rajasthan, Gujarat, and Chhattisgarh. It grows best in sandy loam soil with good drainage and requires tropical conditions. Farmers often face challenges such as low yield and adulteration of roots.

== Medicinal uses and research ==
Traditionally, safed musli is classified in Ayurveda as a rasayana and vajikaran herb. Modern studies have identified more than 25 phytochemicals with antioxidant and anti-inflammatory properties, and ongoing research explores its potential in treating arthritis, diabetes, and male fertility issues.

== Economic importance ==
Due to its high demand in herbal medicine and nutraceutical industries, safed musli is considered a cash crop and is often referred to as "white gold" in Ayurveda.

== Conservation ==
Overharvesting has reduced wild populations of safed musli, leading to its classification as endangered in several regions. Conservation efforts include promoting sustainable cultivation and discouraging wild collection.
