= Chlorophytum debile =

Scientific classification
- Kingdom: Plantae
- Clade: Embryophytes
- Clade: Tracheophytes
- Clade: Angiosperms
- Clade: Monocots
- Order: Asparagales
- Family: Asparagaceae
- Subfamily: Agavoideae
- Genus: Chlorophytum
- Species: C. debile

Binomial name
- Chlorophytum debile Baker

Synonyms
- Chlorophytum gilletii Compère; Chlorophytum gracile De Wild., nom. illeg.

Species of plant

Chlorophytum debile is a species of flowering plant in the family Asparagaceae, native to western and southern tropical Africa. It was first described by John Gilbert Baker in 1878.

== Distribution ==
Chlorophytum debile is widely distributed in tropical Africa. It is native to most of West Tropical Africa (Benin, Burkina, Ghana, Guinea, Guinea-Bissau, Ivory Coast, Liberia, Mali, Nigeria, Senegal, Sierra Leone, and Togo), parts of West-Central Tropical Africa (the Democratic Republic of the Congo, Equatorial Guinea, Gabon), and Angola and Zambia in South Tropical Africa.
