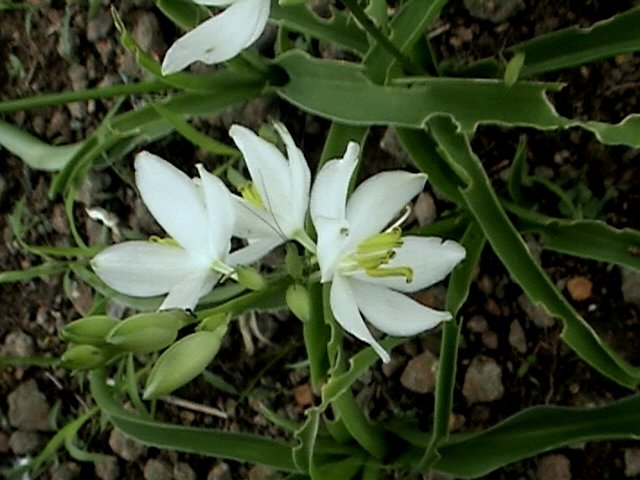

Conservation status
- Least Concern (IUCN 3.1)

Scientific classification
- Kingdom: Plantae
- Clade: Embryophytes
- Clade: Tracheophytes
- Clade: Angiosperms
- Clade: Monocots
- Order: Asparagales
- Family: Asparagaceae
- Subfamily: Agavoideae
- Genus: Chlorophytum
- Species: C. tuberosum

Binomial name
- Chlorophytum tuberosum (Roxb.) Baker

Synonyms
- Acrospira lilioides A.Chev. Anthericum kilimandscharicum Poelln. Anthericum niveum (Poir.) Spreng. Anthericum ornithogaloides Hochst. ex A.Rich. Anthericum tuberosum Roxb. Chlorophytum anthericoideum Dalzell; Chlorophytum kulsii Cufod. Chlorophytum niveum (Poir.) M.R.Almeida; Chlorophytum russii Chiov. Liliago nivea (Poir.) C.Presl; Liliago tuberosa (Roxb.) C.Presl; Phalangium niveum Poir. Phalangium ornithogaloides (Hochst. ex A.Rich.) Schweinf. Phalangium tuberosum (Roxb.) Kunth

= Chlorophytum tuberosum =

Species of plant

Chlorophytum tuberosum is a species of flowering plant in the Asparagaceae family. It is one of several species known by the common name musli. It is native to parts of Africa and India. It has historical uses in Ayurveda.
