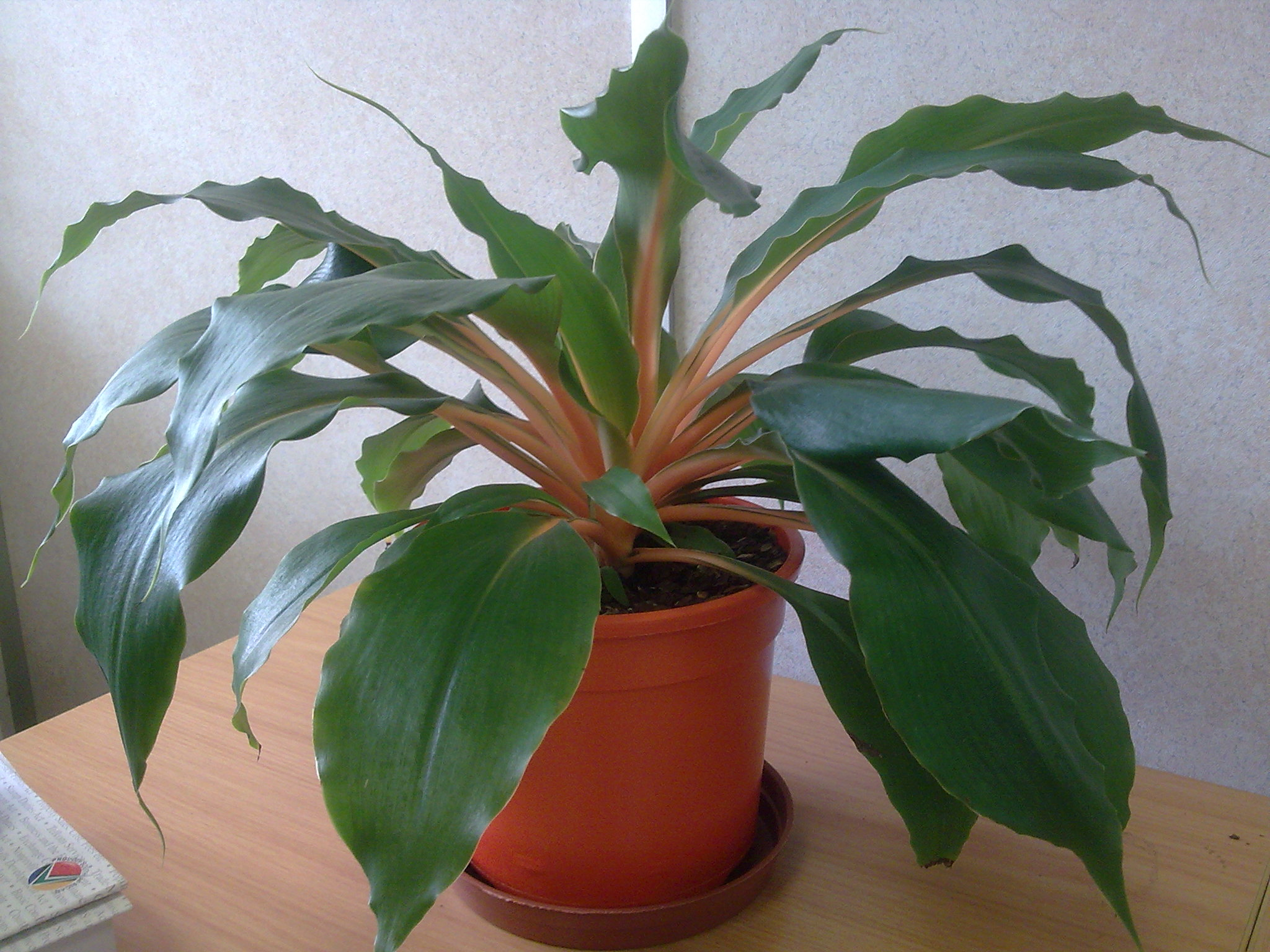
- A potted specimen
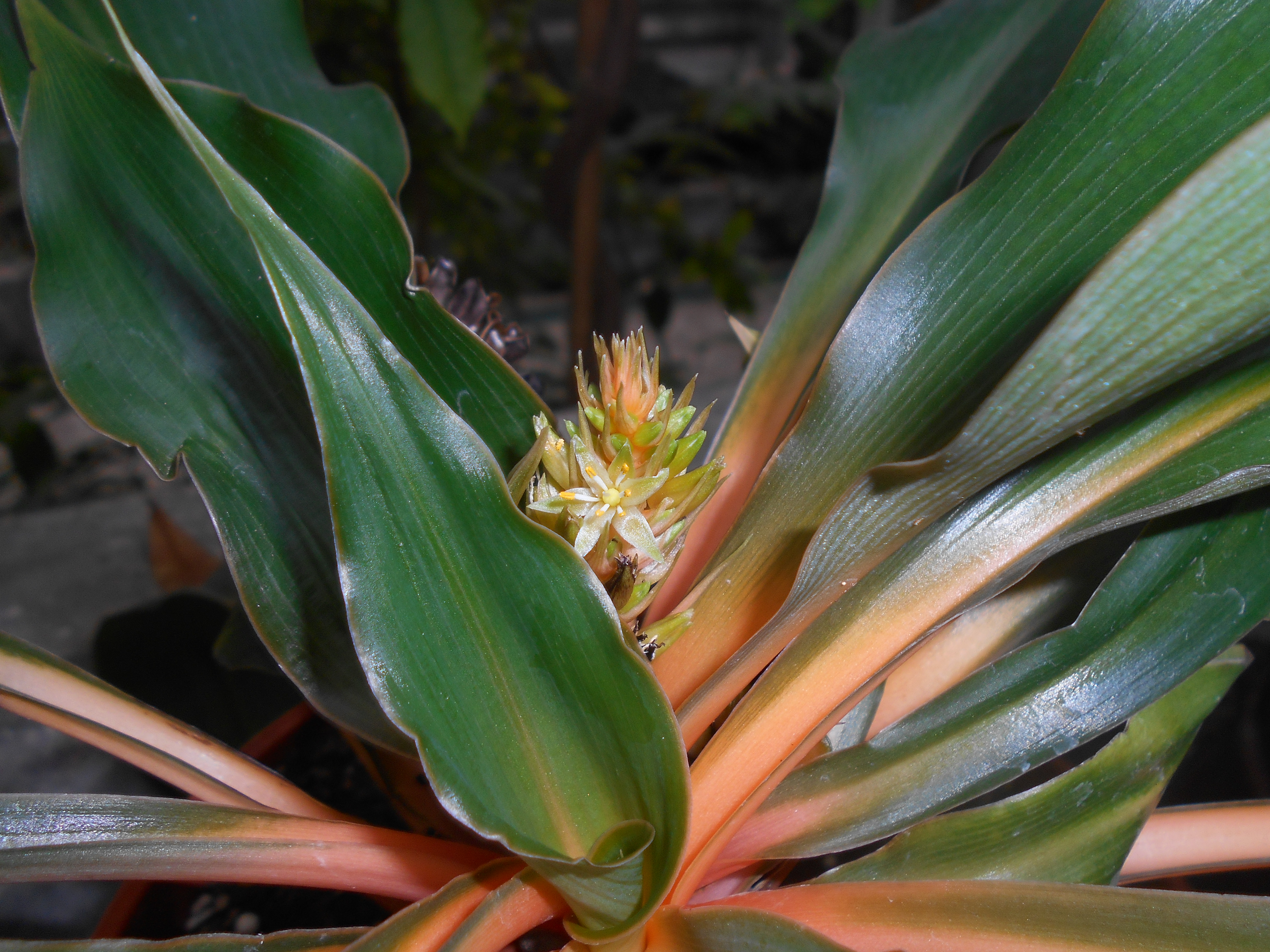
- Inflorescence

Scientific classification
- Kingdom: Plantae
- Clade: Tracheophytes
- Clade: Angiosperms
- Clade: Monocots
- Order: Asparagales
- Family: Asparagaceae
- Subfamily: Agavoideae
- Genus: Chlorophytum
- Species: C. orchidastrum

Binomial name
- Chlorophytum orchidastrum Lindl.

Synonyms
- List: Chlorophytum macropodum K.Krause; Chlorophytum mannii Baker; Chlorophytum petiolatum Baker; Chlorophytum seretii De Wild.; Chlorophytum seretii var. likimensis De Wild.; Chlorophytum talbotii Rendle; Chlorophytum zenkeri Engl.; Phalangium oligospermum Wight

= Chlorophytum orchidastrum =

Species of plant

Chlorophytum orchidastrum, variously called the orange spider plant, green orange spider plant, fire flash, fire glory, Mandarin plant, Mandarin spider plant, and Sierra Leone lily, is a species of flowering plant in the family Asparagaceae. It is native to western and west-central tropical Africa, from Guinea to the Democratic Republic of the Congo. A clump-forming perennial reaching 40 cm (16 in) and about twice as wide (larger in the wild), it is found in a variety of forest habitats a bit inland from the coast up to 1,300 m (4,300 ft) above sea level. It has gained the Royal Horticultural Society's Award of Garden Merit as a houseplant.

Fruit
