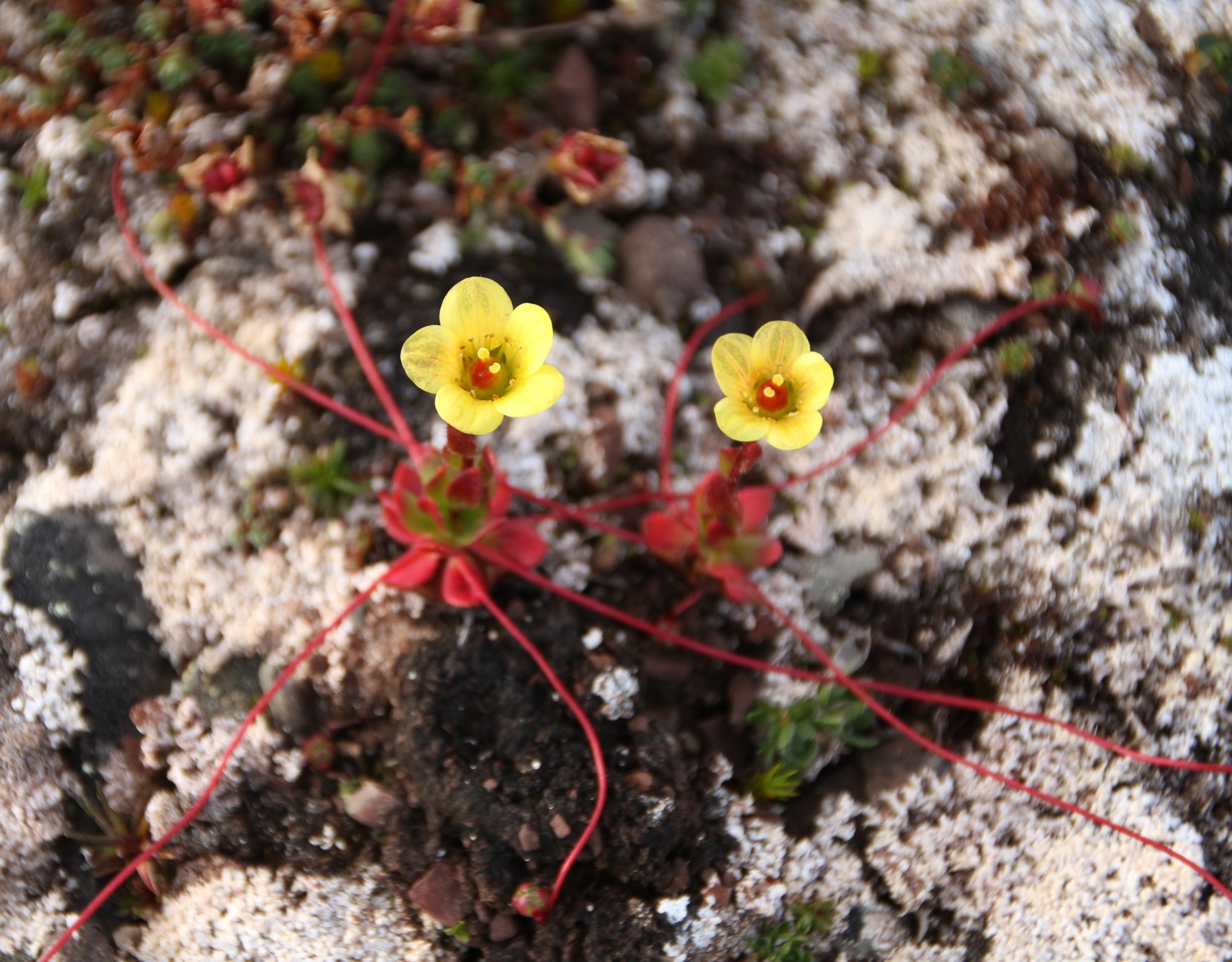

Scientific classification
- Kingdom: Plantae
- Clade: Tracheophytes
- Clade: Angiosperms
- Clade: Eudicots
- Order: Saxifragales
- Family: Saxifragaceae
- Genus: Saxifraga
- Species: S. platysepala

Binomial name
- Saxifraga platysepala (Trautv.) Tolm.

= Saxifraga platysepala =

Species of flowering plant

Saxifraga platysepala is a species of flowering plant belonging to the family Saxifragaceae.

Its native range is Subarctic.
