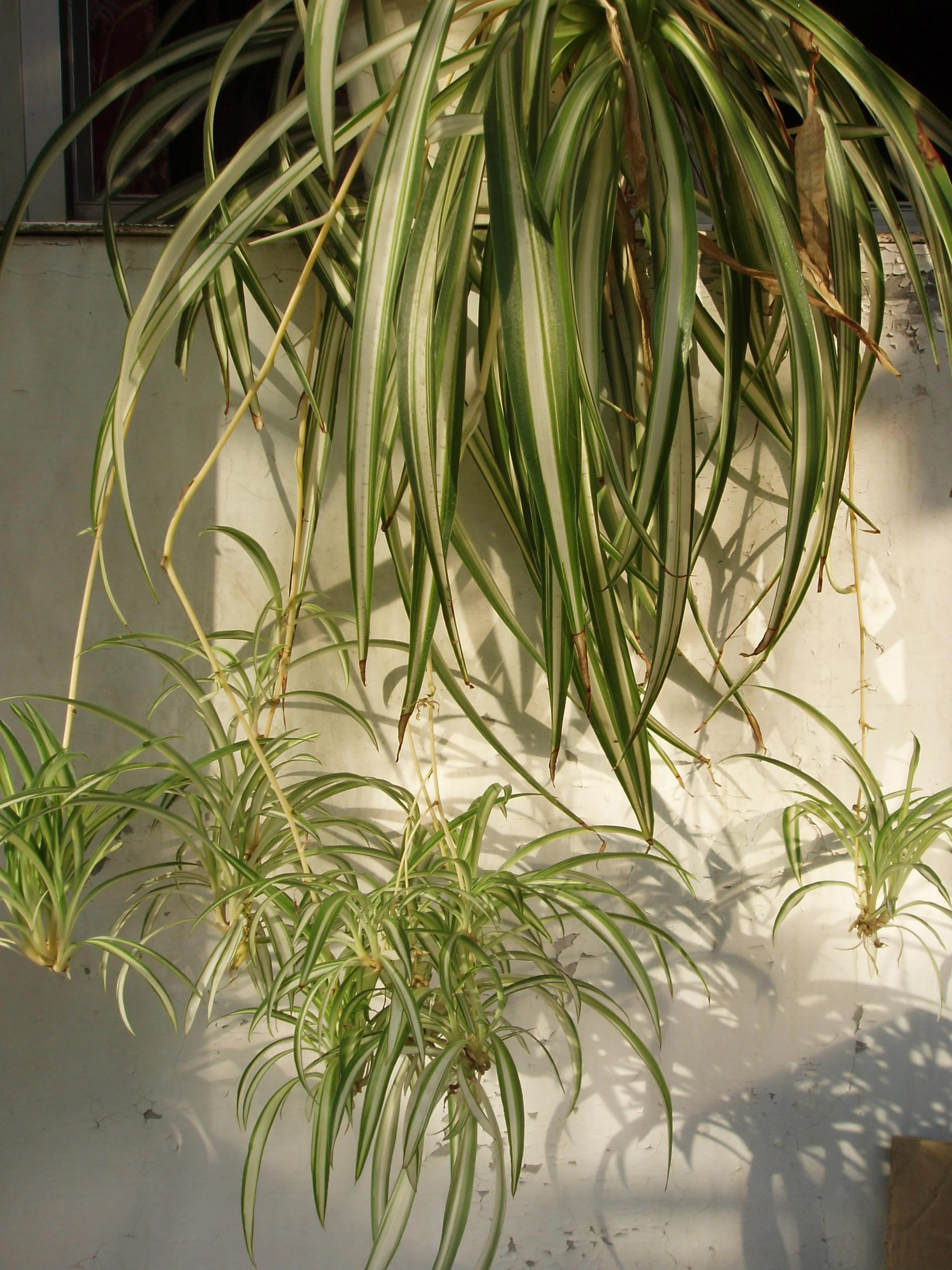
- Chlorophytum comosum 'Vittatum' – a variegated cultivar

Scientific classification
- Kingdom: Plantae
- Clade: Tracheophytes
- Clade: Angiosperms
- Clade: Monocots
- Order: Asparagales
- Family: Asparagaceae
- Subfamily: Agavoideae
- Tribe: Anthericeae
- Genus: Chlorophytum; Ker Gawl.

Type species
- Chlorophytum inornatum Ker Gawl.

Synonyms
- List: Acrospira Welw. ex Baker, illegitimate homonym; Asphodelopsis Steud. ex Baker; Dasystachys Baker, illegitimate homonym, not Oerst. (1859); Debesia Kuntze; Hartwegia Nees; Hollia Heynh.; Schidospermum Griseb.; Verdickia De Wild.

= Chlorophytum =

Genus of plants (spider plants)

Chlorophytum (/ˌklɒrəˈfaɪtəm, ˌklɔː-, -roʊ-/,), colloquially referred to as the spider plants, is a genus of almost 200 species of evergreen perennial flowering plants in the sub-family Agavoideae, within the family Asparagaceae. The plants are native to the tropical and subtropical regions of Africa, Australia, and Asia.

Depending on species, most Chlorophytum mature at about 10–60 cm (3"-12") in height, growing out from a central rosette of long, slender leaves of around 15–75 cm (5"-29") in length. The plants tend to have thick, fleshy, tuberous roots, about 0.5-2 cm (0.17"-0.75") thick. The flowers are small and usually white, produced on sparse panicles up to 120 cm (47") long.

In certain species, such as C. comosum (the ubiquitous 'spider plant'), the plants are known to reproduce vegetatively by producing plantlets—baby plants connected by an "umbilical" stem, sprouting from the side of the main mother-plant. On the ground, or in a wild setting, this vegetative growth habit enables vast swathes of the plant to colonize a single area, as the plantlets develop small roots to eventually anchor into the soil and spread the mass further. In a home or garden setting, these plants are often grown in hanging pots, on plant stands, high shelves or other elevated surfaces.

As the plant develops and throws off babies, or "pups", these may be optionally removed and propagated, either in a vessel of water for a time or directly planted into new substrate. Conversely, if the pups are allowed to remain connected to the mother plant and hang naturally, the appearance vaguely mimics spiders hanging by their silken thread—thus giving the plant the common moniker of "spider-plant". The plantlets will develop aerial roots when left attached to the mother plant, as a means of absorbing ambient humidity until they make contact with an organic substrate, or the ground.

Chlorophytum borivilianum is a native of India, where it is grown for use as a medicinal plant.

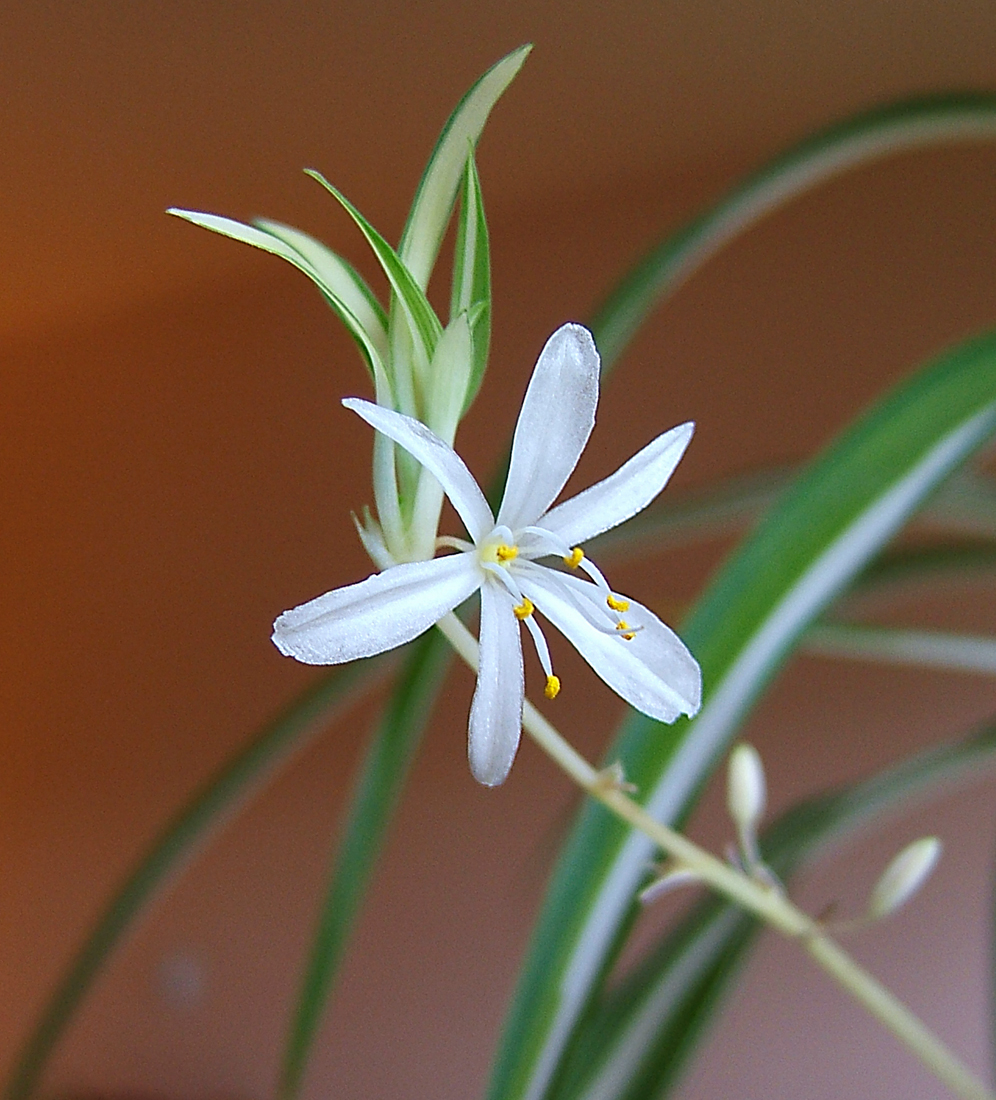
Flower of C. comosum 'Vittatum'

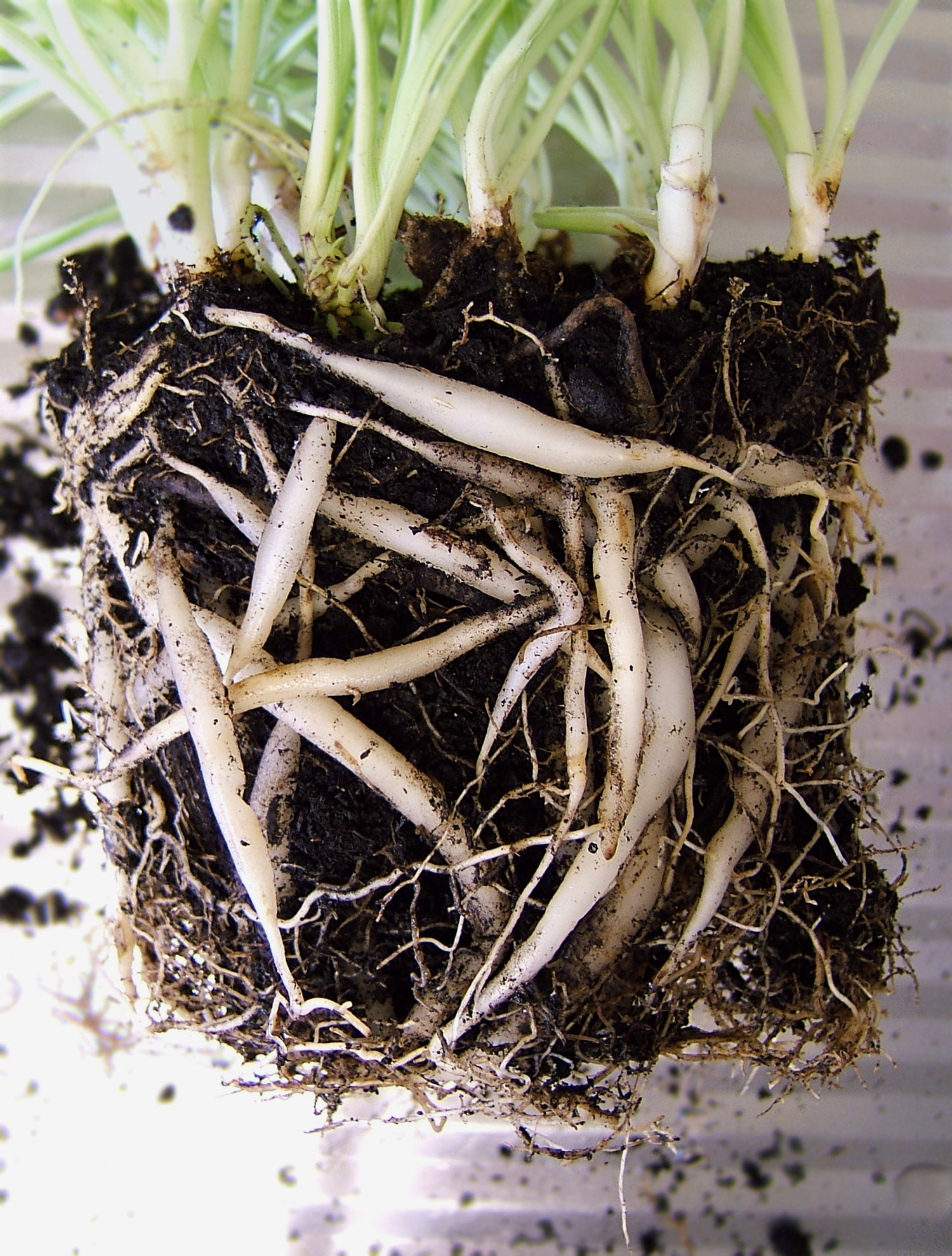
Fleshy tuberous roots of C. comosum 'Vittatum'

== Species ==
As of March 2026, Plants of the World Online accepted the following species:

- Chlorophytum acutum (C.H.Wright) Nordal
- Chlorophytum affine Baker
- Chlorophytum africanum (Baker) Engl.
- Chlorophytum alismifolium Baker
- Chlorophytum alpinum Benth. ex Baker
- Chlorophytum altum Engl. & K.Krause
- Chlorophytum anceps (Baker) Kativu
- Chlorophytum andongense Baker
- Chlorophytum angulicaule (Baker) Kativu
- Chlorophytum angustiracemosum Poelln.
- Chlorophytum angustissimum (Poelln.) Nordal
- Chlorophytum ankarense H.Perrier
- Chlorophytum appendiculatum H.Perrier
- Chlorophytum applanatum Nordal & Thulin
- Chlorophytum arcuatoramosum R.B.Drumm.
- Chlorophytum aridum Oberm.
- Chlorophytum arundinaceum Baker
- Chlorophytum asperum J.C.Manning
- Chlorophytum assamicum D.Borah & A.P.Das
- Chlorophytum basitrichum Poelln.
- Chlorophytum baturense K.Krause
- Chlorophytum belgaumense Chandore, Malpure, Adsul & S.R.Yadav
- Chlorophytum benguellense (Baker) Meerts
- Chlorophytum benuense Engl. & K.Krause
- Chlorophytum bharuchae Ansari, Sundararagh. & Hemadri
- Chlorophytum bifolium Dammer
- Chlorophytum blepharophyllum Schweinf. ex Baker
- Chlorophytum borivilianum Santapau & R.R.Fern.
- Chlorophytum bowkeri Baker
- Chlorophytum brachystachyum Baker
- Chlorophytum bracteatum Hua
- Chlorophytum brevipedunculatum Poelln.
- Chlorophytum breviscapum Dalzell
- Chlorophytum bulbinifolium Hoell & Nordal
- Chlorophytum burundiense Meerts
- Chlorophytum calyptrocarpum (Baker) Kativu
- Chlorophytum cameronii (Baker) Kativu
- Chlorophytum camporum Engl. & K.Krause
- Chlorophytum capense (L.) Voss
- Chlorophytum caudatibracteatum Engl. & K.Krause
- Chlorophytum caulescens (Baker) Marais & Reilly
- Chlorophytum chelindaense Kativu & Nordal
- Chlorophytum chevalieri Poelln.
- Chlorophytum chinense Bureau & Franch.
- Chlorophytum chloranthum Baker
- Chlorophytum clarae Bjorå & Nordal
- Chlorophytum collinum (Poelln.) Nordal
- Chlorophytum colubrinum (Baker) Engl.
- Chlorophytum comosum (Thunb.) Jacques
- Chlorophytum cooperi (Baker) Nordal
- Chlorophytum cordifolium De Wild.
- Chlorophytum crassinerve (Baker) Oberm.
- Chlorophytum cremnophilum van Jaarsv.
- Chlorophytum crispum (Thunb.) Baker
- Chlorophytum cyperaceum (Kies) Nordal
- Chlorophytum dalzielii (Hutch. ex Hepper) Nordal
- Chlorophytum debile Baker
- Chlorophytum decaryanum H.Perrier
- Chlorophytum decipiens Baker
- Chlorophytum delicatulum Osborne, Vollesen & Bjorå
- Chlorophytum dianellifolium (Baker) H.Perrier
- Chlorophytum distichum H.Perrier
- Chlorophytum diwanjii Mujaffar, A.P.Tiwari & Chandore
- Chlorophytum dolichocarpum Tamura
- Chlorophytum ducis-aprutii Chiov.
- Chlorophytum elgonense Bullock
- Chlorophytum fasciculatum (Baker) Kativu
- Chlorophytum fernandesii (Poelln.) Meerts
- Chlorophytum filifolium Nordal & Thulin
- Chlorophytum filipendulum Baker
- Chlorophytum fischeri (Baker) Baker
- Chlorophytum gallabatense Schweinf. ex Baker
- Chlorophytum galpinii (Baker) Kativu
- Chlorophytum geayanum (H.Perrier) Marais & Reilly
- Chlorophytum geophilum Peter ex Poelln.
- Chlorophytum glaucoides Blatt.
- Chlorophytum glaucum Dalzell
- Chlorophytum goetzei Engl.
- Chlorophytum gothanense Malpure & S.R.Yadav
- Chlorophytum gracile Baker
- Chlorophytum graminifolium (Willd.) Kunth
- Chlorophytum graniticola Kativu
- Chlorophytum graniticum H.Perrier
- Chlorophytum graptophyllum (Baker) Marais & Reilly
- Chlorophytum haygarthii J.M.Wood & M.S.Evans
- Chlorophytum herrmannii Nordal & Sebsebe
- Chlorophytum heynei Baker
- Chlorophytum hiranense Nordal & Thulin
- Chlorophytum hirsutum A.D.Poulsen & Nordal
- Chlorophytum holstii Engl.
- Chlorophytum humbertianum H.Perrier
- Chlorophytum humifusum Cufod.
- Chlorophytum hypoxiforme (H.Perrier) Marais & Reilly
- Chlorophytum hysteranthum Kativu
- Chlorophytum immaculatum (Hepper) Nordal
- Chlorophytum inconspicuum (Baker) Nordal
- Chlorophytum indicum (Willd. ex Schult. & Schult.f.) Dress
- Chlorophytum inornatum Ker Gawl.
- Chlorophytum intermedium Craib
- Chlorophytum keiskammaense van Jaarsv., Hankey & Harrower
- Chlorophytum kolhapurense Sardesai, S.P.Gaikwad & S.R.Yadav
- Chlorophytum kolliense Soosairaj
- Chlorophytum krauseanum (Dinter) Kativu
- Chlorophytum krookianum Zahlbr.
- Chlorophytum lancifolium Welw. ex Baker
- Chlorophytum laxum R.Br.
- Chlorophytum leptoneurum (C.H.Wright) Poelln.
- Chlorophytum lewisae Oberm.
- Chlorophytum limosum (Baker) Nordal
- Chlorophytum littorale Nordal & Thulin
- Chlorophytum longifolium Schweinf. ex Baker
- Chlorophytum longiscapum Dammer
- Chlorophytum longissimum Ridl.
- Chlorophytum macrophyllum (A.Rich.) Asch.
- Chlorophytum macrorrhizum Poelln.
- Chlorophytum macrosporum Baker
- Chlorophytum madagascariense Baker
- Chlorophytum malabaricum Baker
- Chlorophytum malayense Ridl.
- Chlorophytum mamillatum Elden & Nordal
- Chlorophytum modestum Baker
- Chlorophytum molle (Baker) Meerts
- Chlorophytum monophyllum Oberm.
- Chlorophytum namaquense Schltr. ex Poelln.
- Chlorophytum namorokense H.Perrier
- Chlorophytum nepalense (Lindl.) Baker
- Chlorophytum nervosum Nordal & Thulin
- Chlorophytum nidulans (Baker) Brenan
- Chlorophytum nimmonii Dalzell
- Chlorophytum nubicum (Baker) Kativu
- Chlorophytum nyasae (Rendle) Kativu
- Chlorophytum nzii A.Chev. ex Hepper
- Chlorophytum occultum A.D.Poulsen & Nordal
- Chlorophytum orchidastrum Lindl.
- Chlorophytum orchideum (Welw. ex Baker) Meerts
- Chlorophytum palghatense K.M.P.Kumar & Adsul
- Chlorophytum parkeri (Baker) Marais & Reilly
- Chlorophytum parvulum Chiov.
- Chlorophytum paucinervatum (Poelln.) Nordal
- Chlorophytum pauciphyllum Oberm.
- Chlorophytum pauper Poelln.
- Chlorophytum pendulum Nordal & Thulin
- Chlorophytum peralbum Poelln.
- Chlorophytum perfoliatum Kativu
- Chlorophytum petraeum Nordal & Thulin
- Chlorophytum petrophilum K.Krause
- Chlorophytum pilosicarinatum (Poelln.) Meerts
- Chlorophytum polystachys Baker
- Chlorophytum pseudocaule Tesfaye & Nordal
- Chlorophytum pterocarpum Nordal & Thulin
- Chlorophytum pubiflorum Baker
- Chlorophytum pusillum Schweinf. ex Baker
- Chlorophytum pygmaeum (Weim.) Kativu
- Chlorophytum radula (Baker) Nordal
- Chlorophytum ramosissimum Nordal & Thulin
- Chlorophytum rangei (Engl. & K.Krause) Nordal
- Chlorophytum recurvifolium (Baker) C.Archer & Kativu
- Chlorophytum reflexibracteatum Poelln.
- Chlorophytum restrictum Kativu
- Chlorophytum rhizopendulum Bjorå & Hemp
- Chlorophytum rigidum Kunth
- Chlorophytum ruahense Engl.
- Chlorophytum rubribracteatum (De Wild.) Kativu
- Chlorophytum rutenbergianum Vatke
- Chlorophytum saundersiae (Baker) Nordal
- Chlorophytum scabrum Baker
- Chlorophytum senegalense (Baker) Hepper
- Chlorophytum serpens Sebsebe & Nordal
- Chlorophytum sharmae Adsul, Lekhak & S.R.Yadav
- Chlorophytum sikkimense P.Rai
- Chlorophytum simplex Craib
- Chlorophytum sofiense (H.Perrier) Marais & Reilly
- Chlorophytum somaliense Baker
- Chlorophytum sparsiflorum Baker
- Chlorophytum sphacelatum (Baker) Kativu
- Chlorophytum sphagnicola Meerts
- Chlorophytum staudtii Nordal
- Chlorophytum stenopetalum Baker
- Chlorophytum stolzii (K.Krause) Weim.
- Chlorophytum subligulatum H.Perrier
- Chlorophytum subpetiolatum (Baker) Kativu
- Chlorophytum suffruticosum Baker
- Chlorophytum superpositum (Baker) Marais & Reilly
- Chlorophytum sylvestre Bardot-Vaucoulon
- Chlorophytum tenerrimum Peter ex Poelln.
- Chlorophytum tetraphyllum (L.f.) Baker
- Chlorophytum tillariense S.R.Yadav & Chandore
- Chlorophytum tordense Chiov.
- Chlorophytum transvaalense (Baker) Kativu
- Chlorophytum trichophlebium (Baker) Nordal
- Chlorophytum triflorum (Aiton) Kunth
- Chlorophytum tripedale (Baker) H.Perrier
- Chlorophytum tuberosum (Roxb.) Baker
- Chlorophytum ustulatum (Welw. ex Baker) Meerts
- Chlorophytum velutinum Kativu
- Chlorophytum vespertinum Vollesen
- Chlorophytum vestitum Baker
- Chlorophytum viridescens Engl.
- Chlorophytum viscosum Kunth
- Chlorophytum waibelii K.Krause
- Chlorophytum warneckei (Engl.) Marais & Reilly
- Chlorophytum zambiense Bjorå & Nordal
- Chlorophytum zavattarii (Cufod.) Nordal
- Chlorophytum zingiberastrum Nordal & A.D.Poulsen
