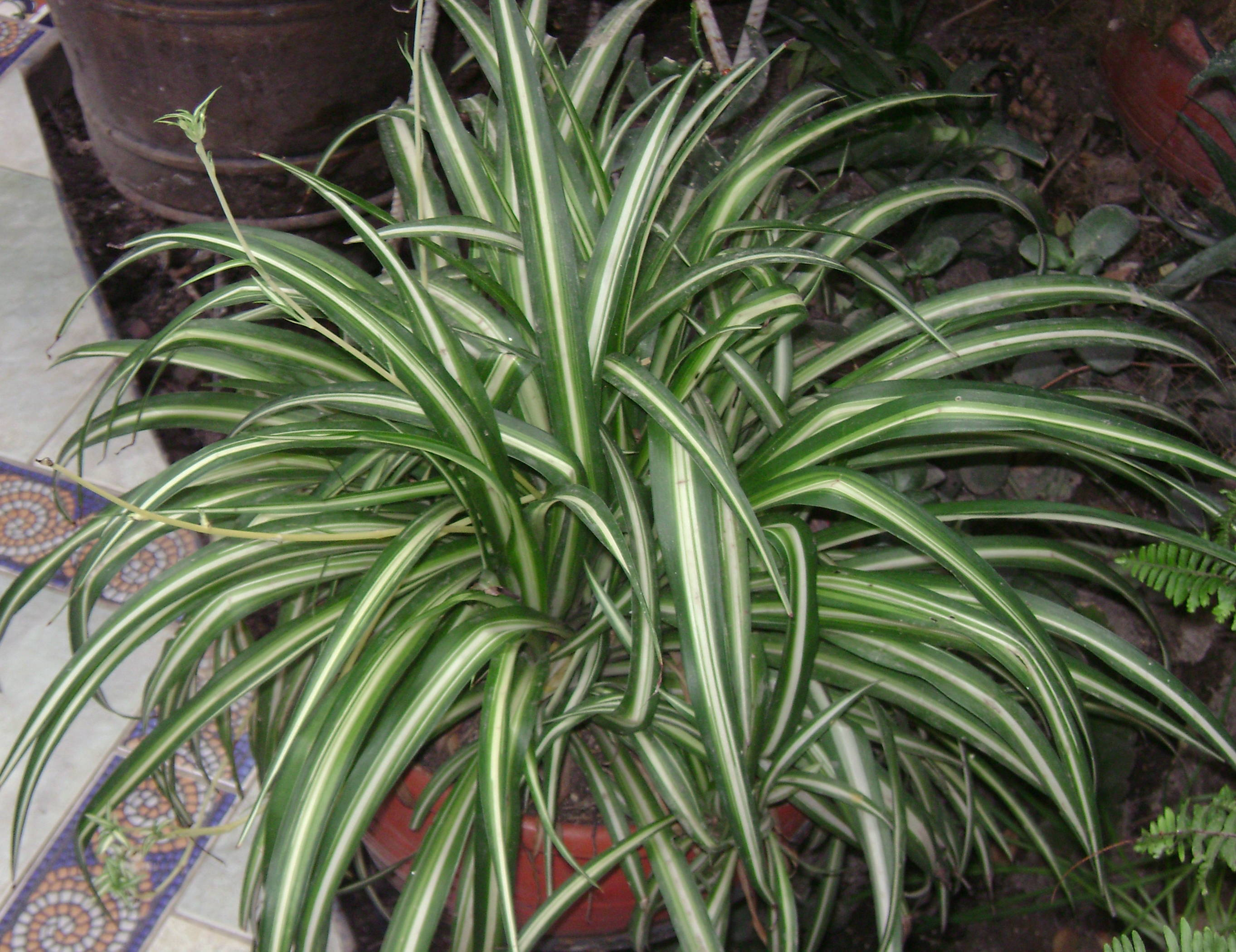
- 'Vittatum' cultivar

Scientific classification
- Kingdom: Plantae
- Clade: Embryophytes
- Clade: Tracheophytes
- Clade: Angiosperms
- Clade: Monocots
- Order: Asparagales
- Family: Asparagaceae
- Subfamily: Agavoideae
- Genus: Chlorophytum
- Species: C. comosum

Binomial name
- Chlorophytum comosum (Thunb.) Jacques

Synonyms
- Anthericum comosum Thunb.; Hartwegia comosa (Thunb.) Nees

= Chlorophytum comosum =

Species of flowering plant

Chlorophytum comosum, usually called spider plant or common spider plant due to its spider-like look, also known as spider ivy, airplane plant, ribbon plant (a name it shares with Dracaena sanderiana), and hen and chicks, is a species of evergreen perennial flowering plant of the family Asparagaceae. It is native to tropical and Southern Africa but has become naturalized in other parts of the world, including Western Australia and Bangladesh. Chlorophytum comosum is easy to grow as a houseplant because of its resilience, but it can be sensitive to the fluoride in tap water, which commonly gives it "burnt tips". Variegated forms are the most popular.

== Description ==
Chlorophytum comosum grows to about 60 cm (24 in) tall, although as a hanging plant it can descend many feet. It has fleshy, tuberous roots, each about 5–10 cm (2–4 in) long. The long narrow leaves reach a length of 20–45 cm (8–18 in) and are around 6–25 millimetres (0.2–1.0 in) wide.

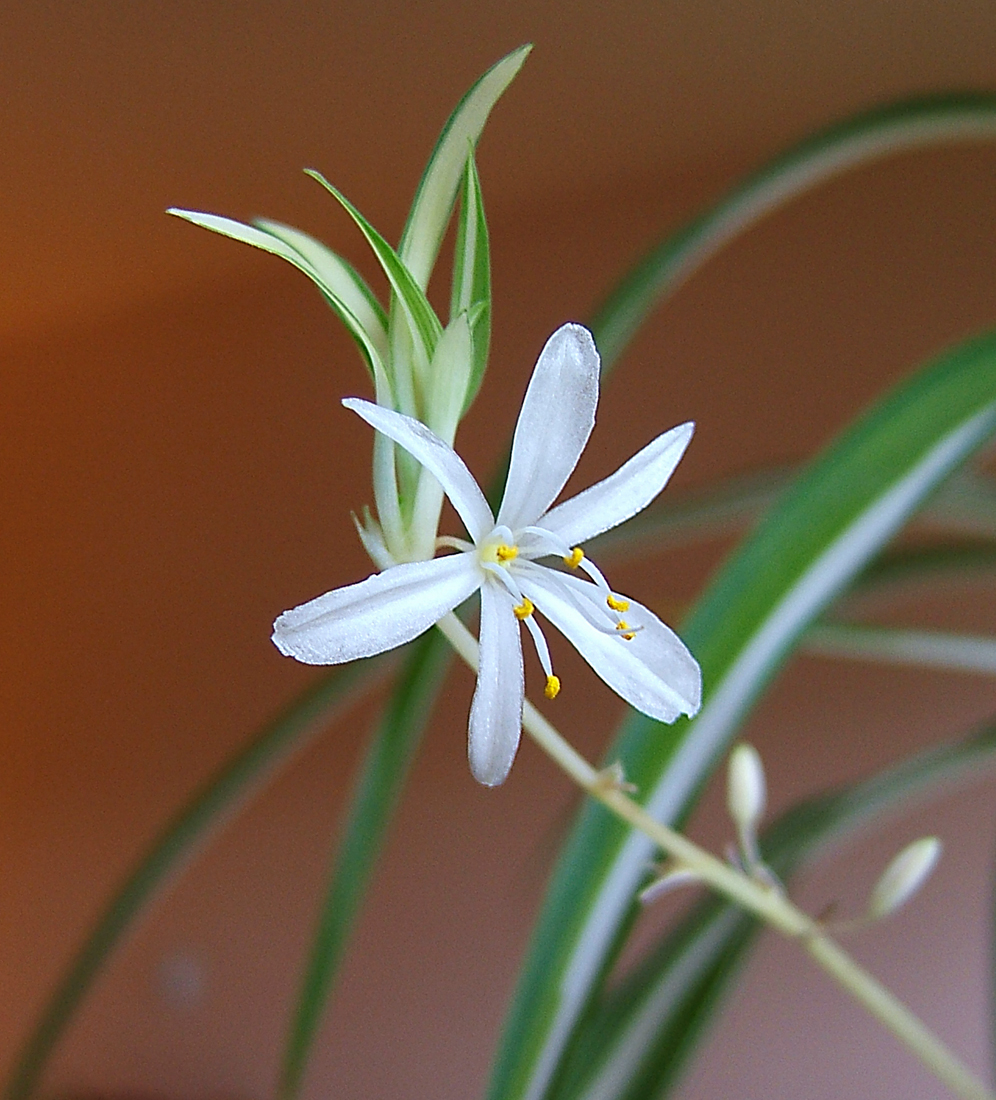
Flower of 'Vittatum'

Flowers are produced in a long, branched inflorescence, which can reach a length of up to 75 cm (30 in) and eventually bends downward to meet the earth. Flowers initially occur in clusters of 1–6 at intervals along the stem (scape) of the inflorescence. Each cluster is at the base of a bract, which ranges from 2–8 cm (0.8–3.1 in) in length, becoming smaller toward the end of the inflorescence. Most of the flowers that are produced initially die off, so that relatively, the inflorescences are sparsely flowered.

Individual flowers are greenish-white, borne on stalks (pedicels) some 4–8 mm (0.2–0.3 in) long. Each flower has six triply veined tepals that are 6–9 mm (0.2–0.4 in) long and slightly hooded or boat-shaped at their tips. The stamens consist of a pollen-producing anther about 3.5 mm (0.1 in) long with a filament of similar length or slightly longer. The central style is 3–8 mm (0.1–0.3 in) long. Seeds are produced in a capsule, 3–8 mm (0.1–0.3 in) long, on stalks (pedicels) that lengthen to up to 12 mm (0.5 in).

The inflorescences carry not only flowers but also vegetative plantlets at the tips of their branches, which eventually droop and touch the soil, developing adventitious roots. The stems (scapes) of the inflorescence are called "stolons" in some sources, but this term is more correctly used for stems that do not bear flowers and have roots at the nodes.

== Taxonomy ==
The first formal description of Chlorophytum comosum was by the Swedish naturalist Carl Peter Thunberg as Anthericum comosum in the 1794 volume of Prodromus Plantarum Capensium, Thunberg's work on the plants of South Africa. The species was subsequently moved to a number of different genera, including Phalangium, Caesia, Hartwegia Nees, and Hollia, before receiving its current placement in Chlorophytum by Jacques in 1862.

The species has been confused with Chlorophytum capense (L.) Voss by some authors, but this is a different species.

=== Intra-specific variation ===
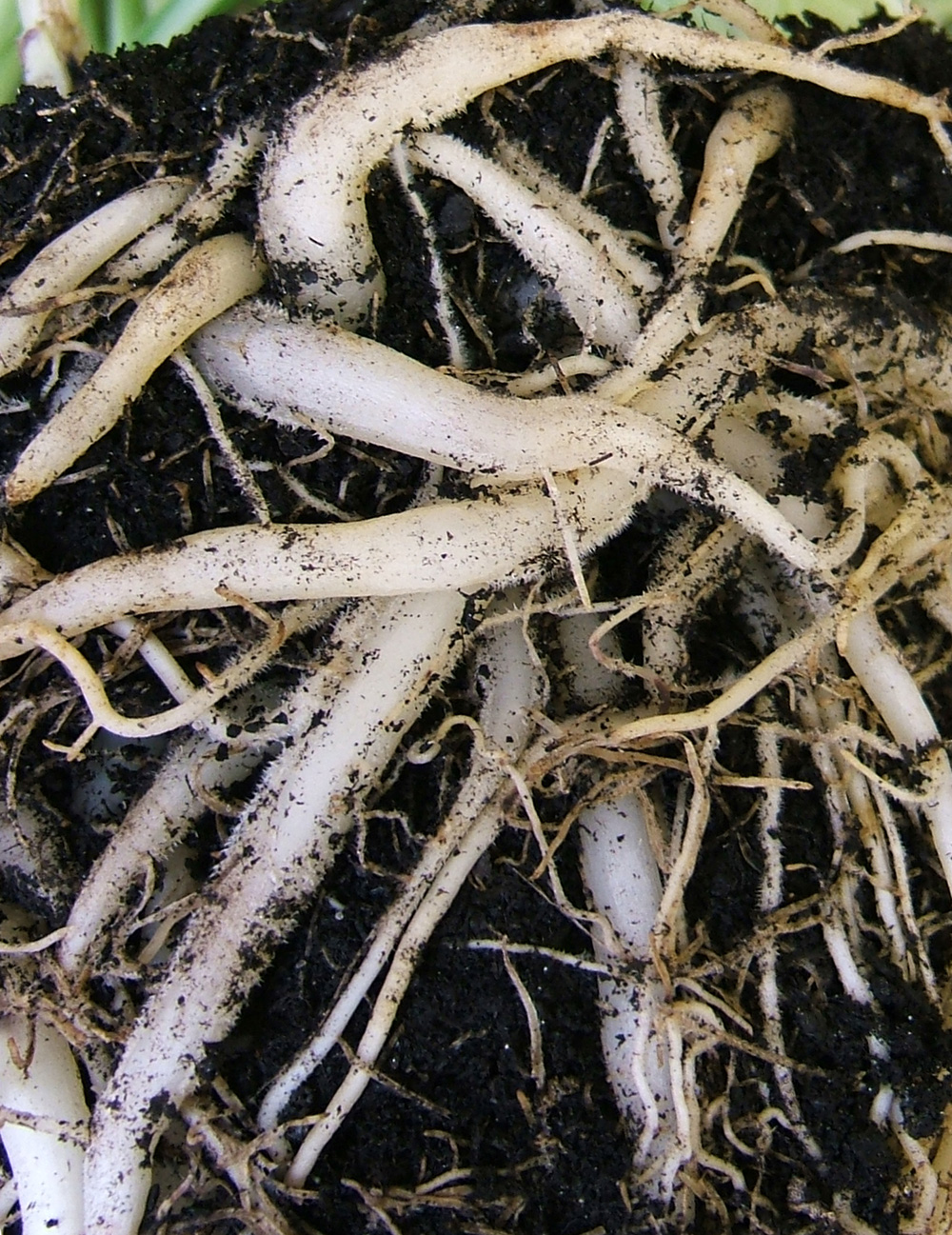
Fleshy roots of pot-grown plant

There are three described varieties of the species: the autonym C. comosum var. comosum has strap-shaped narrow leaves and is found along forest margins; C. comosum var. bipindense has broader, petiolate leaves with stripes on the underside and the inflorescences are 2–3 times the length of the leaves; and C. comosum var. sparsiflorum also has broader leaves that narrow to the base, and usually lacks a petiole and the striping on the underside of the leaf and the inflorescences are up to two times the length of the leaves. The latter two are rainforest-dwelling taxa that had been described earlier as separate species, but botanists Axel Dalberg Poulsen and Inger Nordal reduced the taxa to varieties of C. comosum in 2005.

Delimitation of species boundaries within the genus Chlorophytum is reported to be difficult, possibly because of several evolutionary radiations into forest environments that led to morphological aspects that are too similar to reliably distinguish separate species. The evidence given to support this is the widespread distribution of most taxa in the genus and poor seed dispersal, leading to the conclusion of deeper evolutionary divergence among the taxa.

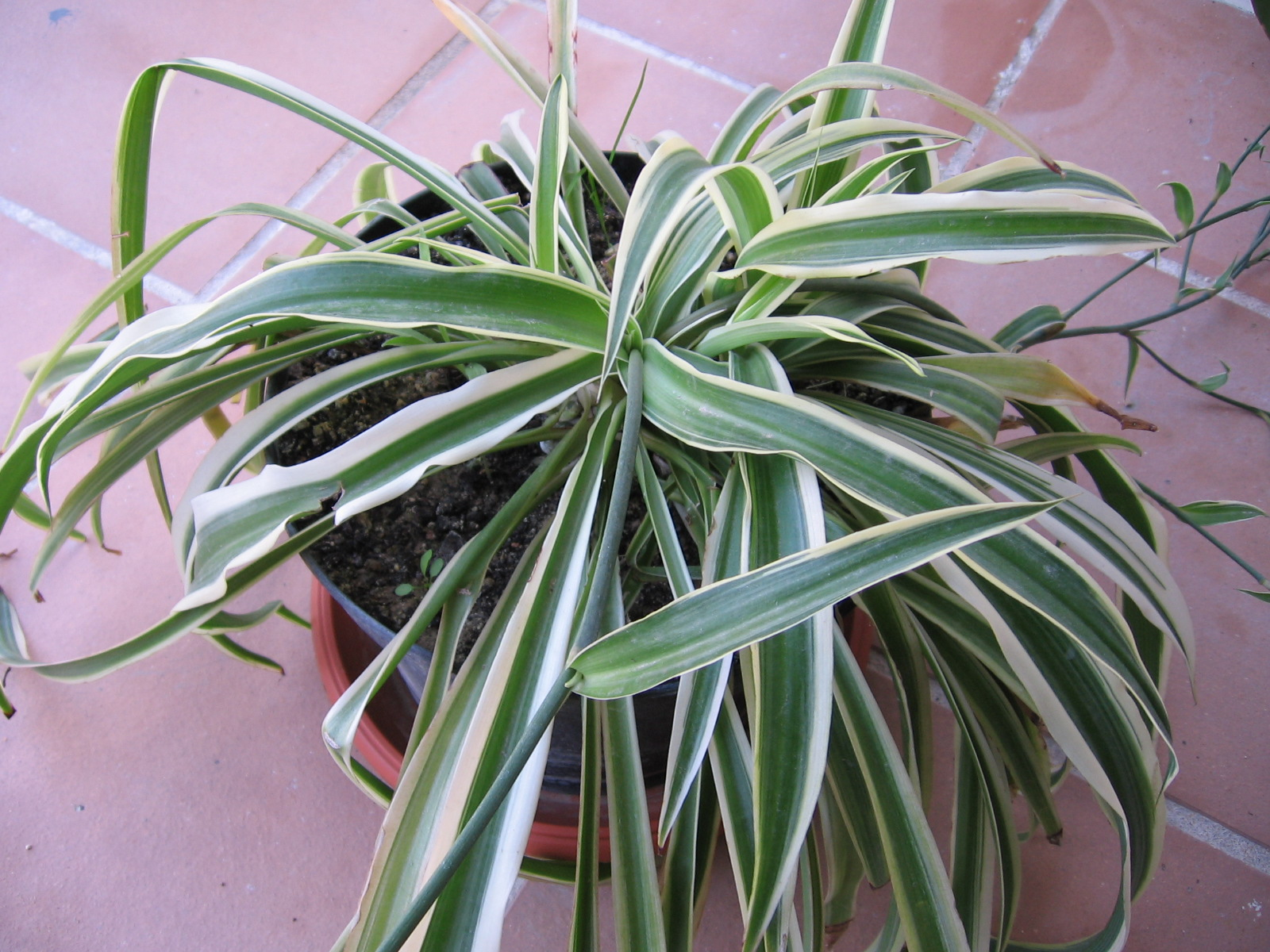
'Variegatum'

The three described varieties in C. comosum could be an example of this convergent evolution of leaf shape among the forest-dwelling varieties from species of disparate origin, leading to the species C. comosum being polyphyletic, instead of the traditional view of morphological divergence among the varieties within the species with the assumption of a common origin (monophyly). The widespread C. comosum var. comosum has slender, near linear leaves that lack a petiole similar to plants found in cultivation and is only found growing at the margins of the rainforest. The two other varieties, C. comosum var. sparsiflorum and C. comosum var. bipindense, possess petioles and have broader leaves necessary for collecting more light in the shady Guineo-Congolean rainforest. A study published in 2005 used 16 morphological characters and was unable to delimit species boundaries among these three taxa, so they were relegated to varietal status. A follow-up study published in 2008 provided preliminary evidence from phylogenetic analysis of plastid and nuclear DNA sequences that established samples from disparate collections sites identified as C. comosum were polyphyletic.

== Distribution ==
Chlorophytum comosum has a widespread native distribution in Africa, being native to six of the ten World Geographical Scheme for Recording Plant Distributions regions of Africa (West Tropical Africa, West-Central Tropical Africa, Northeast Tropical Africa, East Tropical Africa, South Tropical Africa, and Southern Africa).

== Cultivation ==
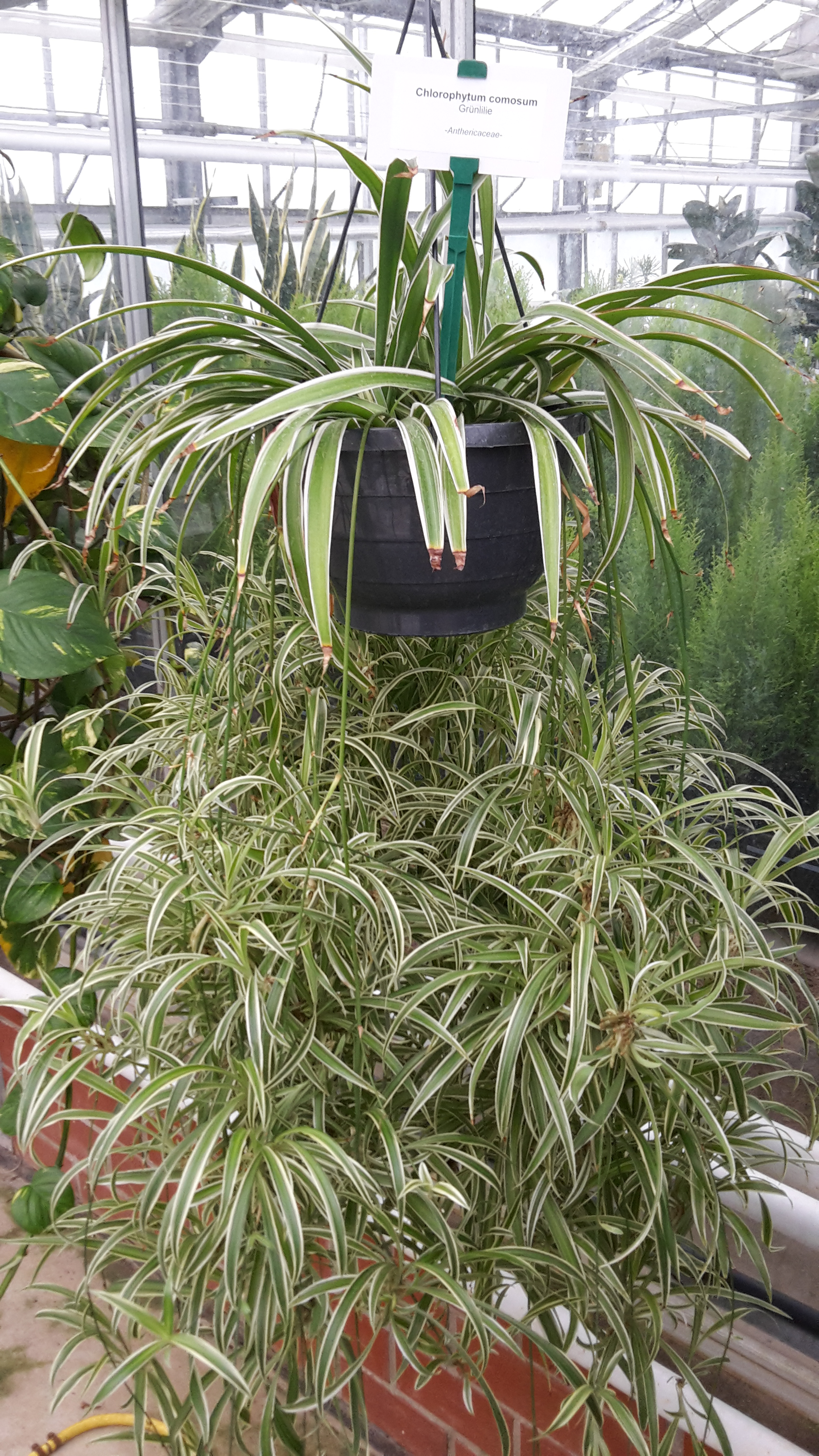
'Variegatum' in a hanging basket showing the plantlets

Chlorophytum comosum is a popular houseplant. The cultivars with all-green leaves forms only a small proportion of plants sold. More common are two variegated cultivars:

- C. comosum 'Vittatum' has mid-green leaves with a broad central white stripe. It is often sold in hanging baskets to display the plantlets. The long stems are white. There is also a "curly" version with this type of striping and compact size.
- C. comosum 'Variegatum' has darker green leaves with white margins. It is generally smaller than the previous cultivar. The long stems are green.

Both cultivars have gained the Royal Horticultural Society's Award of Garden Merit (confirmed 2017). In 2021, 17 other cultivars were listed, including 'Bonnie', 'Green Bonnie' and 'Hawaiian'.

=== Propagation ===
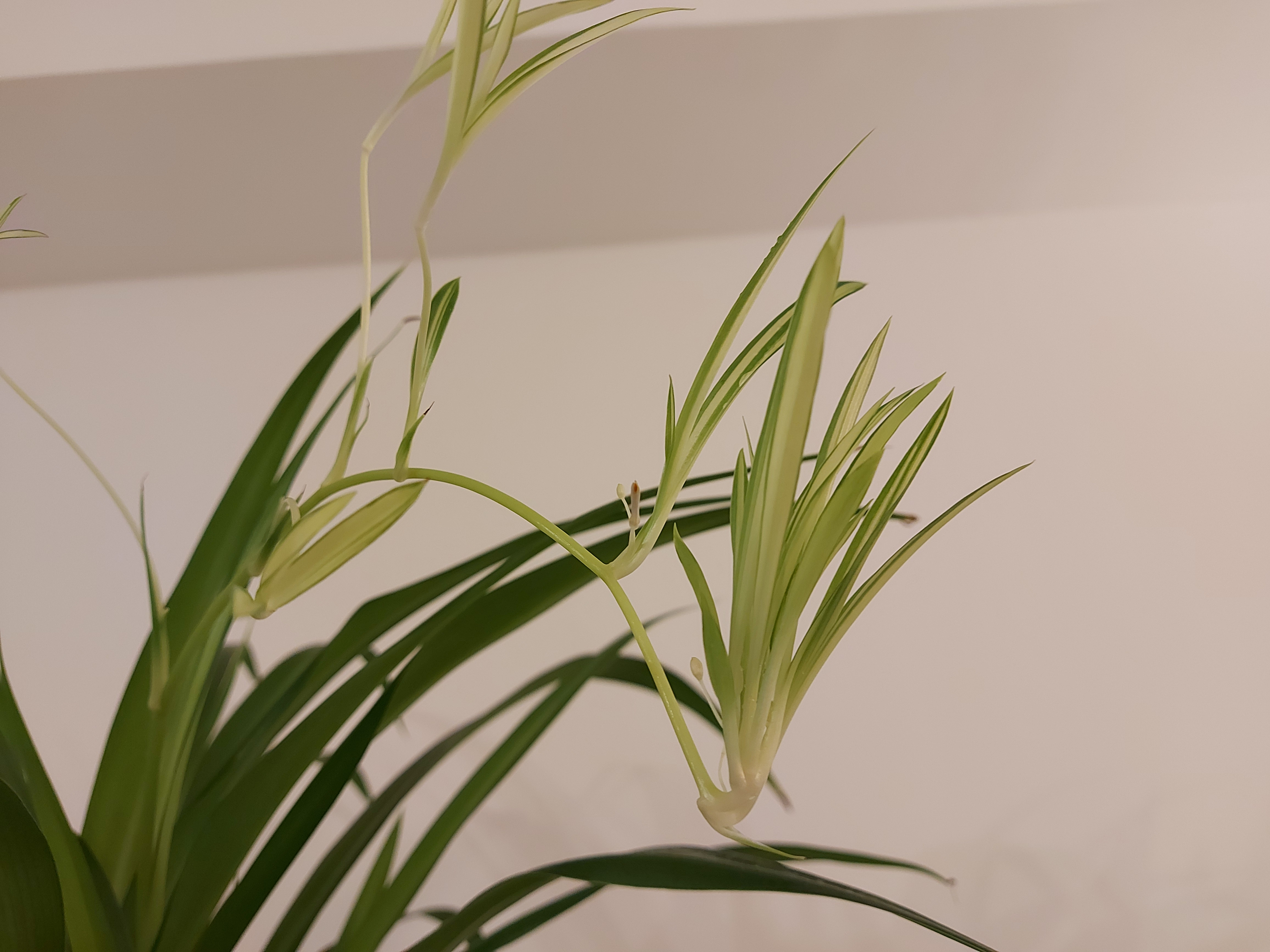
Plantlets and budding flowers

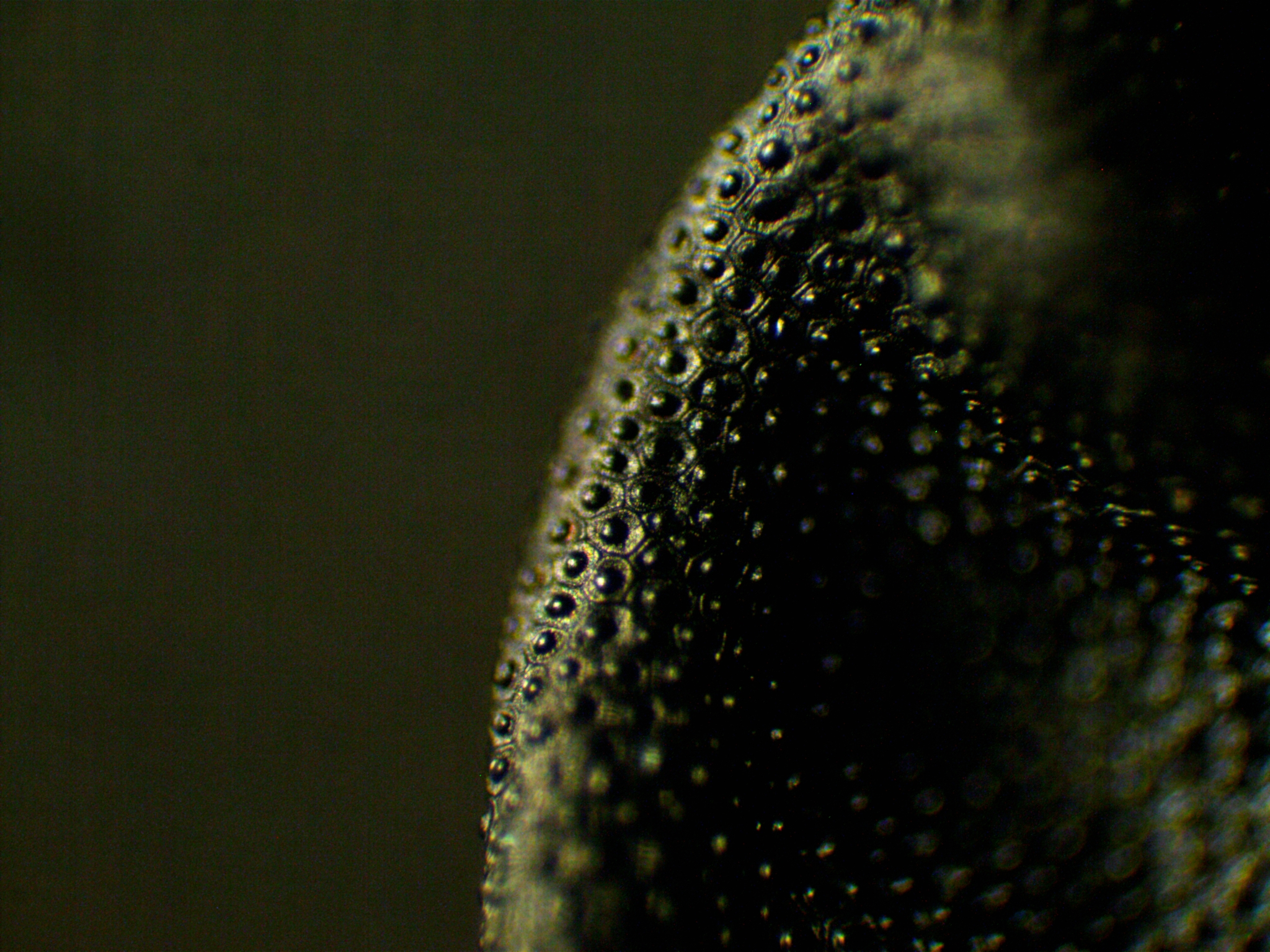
Plant seed taken on a microscope

Propagating Chlorophytum comosum commonly occurs through potting the plantlets, informally referred to as 'spiderettes', or 'pups', directly into potting soil, or pumice, attached to the main plant or cutting the running stems and then potting them.

Spider plants are easy to grow, being able to thrive in a wide range of conditions. They will tolerate temperatures down to 2 °C (35 °F), but grow best at temperatures between 18 °C (65 °F) and 32 °C (90 °F). Plants can be damaged by high fluoride or boron levels.

== Toxicity and effects on pets ==
Spider plants are non-toxic to humans and pets, and are considered edible.

== Air purification ==
The NASA Clean Air Study suggested that air plants were effective at removing common household air toxins formaldehyde and xylene; however, these results are not applicable to typical buildings, where outdoor-to-indoor air exchange already removes volatile organic compounds (VOCs) at a rate that could only be matched by the placement of 10–1000 plants/m^{2} of a building's floor space.

The results also failed to replicate in future studies, with a 2014 review stating that:

While the plant's ability to take up VOCs is well documented in laboratory studies, the effect of plants on indoor air in complex environments like offices requires further investigations to clarify the full capacity of plants in real-life settings.

In the laboratory settings used in the Clean Air Study, spider plants were shown to reduce formaldehyde pollution, and approximately 70 plants would neutralize the formaldehyde released by materials in a representative (c. 167 m^{2} [1,800 sq ft]) energy-efficient house, assuming each plant occupies a 3.8 L (0.84 imp gal; 1.0 US gal) pot.

== Edibility ==
The tuberous roots are reportedly edible (whether raw or cooked unstated) although mild laxative effects are claimed by the Nguni people of its native South Africa.

== See also ==
- List of air-filtering plants
