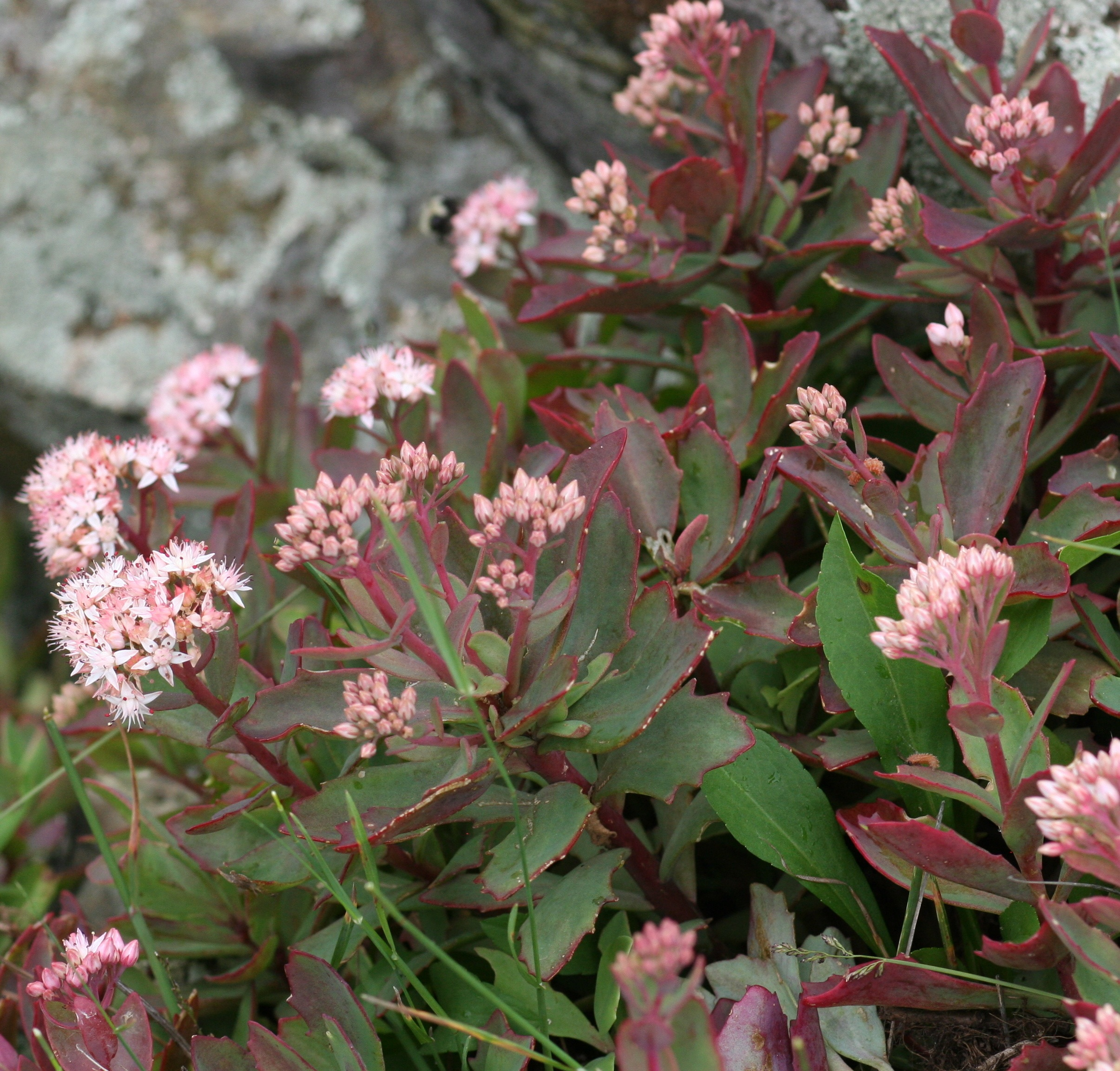

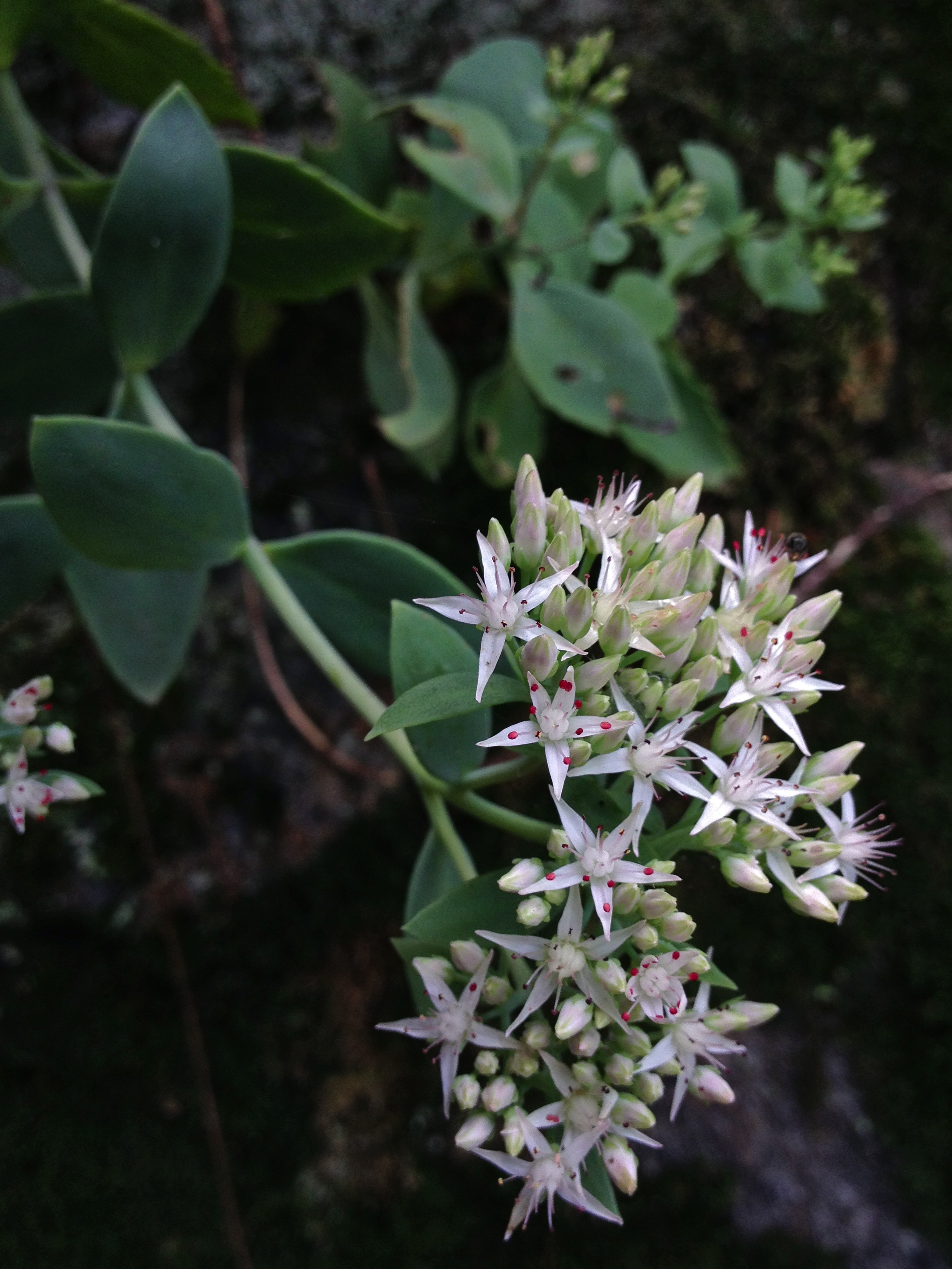

Scientific classification
- Kingdom: Plantae
- Clade: Tracheophytes
- Clade: Angiosperms
- Clade: Eudicots
- Order: Saxifragales
- Family: Crassulaceae
- Genus: Hylotelephium
- Species: H. telephioides

Binomial name
- Hylotelephium telephioides (Michx.) H.Ohba

Synonyms
- Anacampseros telephioides (Michx.) Haw.; Sedum telephioides Michx.

= Hylotelephium telephioides =

Species of succulent

Hylotelephium telephioides is a flowering plant in the stonecrop family Crassulaceae. Its common names include Allegheny stonecrop and live-forever. Its native range in the USA extends from Georgia to Illinois and New York, and it has introduced populations in Ontario. In the wild, it is found on rock outcrops, especially at moderate to high elevations.

== Description ==
Hylotelephium telephioides is a perennial herbaceous plant with alternate, simple leaves, on succulent stems, with sparse, irregular toothing. The flowers are pale pink, borne in fall. The similar species Hylotelephium spectabile and H. telephium both have flowers that are a significantly darker pink.
