= Garden stonecrop =

Garden stonecrop can refer to:

- Hylotelephium telephium
- Hylotelephium erythrostictum
