= Hylotelephium hybrids =

Genus of succulents

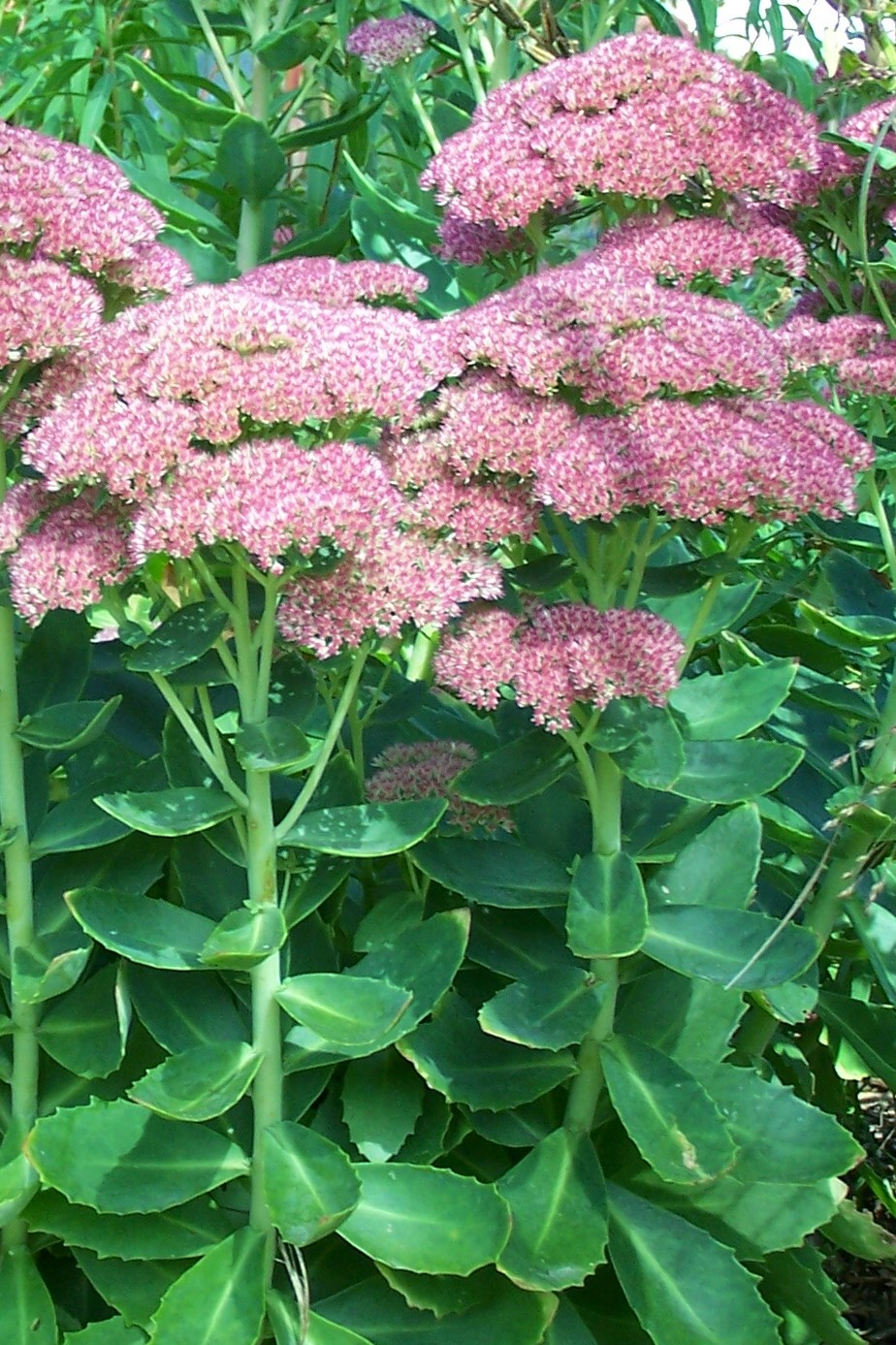
Sedum telephium

Hylotelephium, syn. Sedum, is a genus of flowering plants in the family Crassulaceae. Various species have been hybridized by horticulturalists to create new cultivars. Many of the newer ones are patented.

== Hylotelephium hybrids ==
Those cultivars marked agm have been given an Award of Garden Merit by the Royal Horticultural Society.

- 'Bertram Anderson' agm - very similar to "Vera Jameson," and with the same parentage, this is a newer and "improved" version of this cross (rose-red)
- ’Carl’ agm - rose-pink
- 'Dazzleberry' - Parentage unknown. Patented.
- 'Herbstfreude' agm - This hybrid is also known in English as "Autumn Joy," which is a literal translation from the German. It is a hybrid between Sedum telephium and H. spectabile. It is self-sterile, as it exhibits female flower parts only
- ’Marchant’s Best Red’ agm - deep reddish pink
- ’Matrona’ agm - pale pink flowers
- ’Mr Goodbud’ ^{(PBR)} agm - pink-purple: breeder’s rights protect this cultivar from unauthorised propagation
- ’Red Cauli’ agm - bright pink
- ’Ruby Glow’ agm - deep crimson-purple
- 'Vera Jameson' agm - This is reportedly a natural hybrid discovered in her garden one day by Ms. Jameson. It is said to be a cross between Sedum telephium var. maximum 'Atropurpureum' and H. cauticolum 'Ruby Glow'
