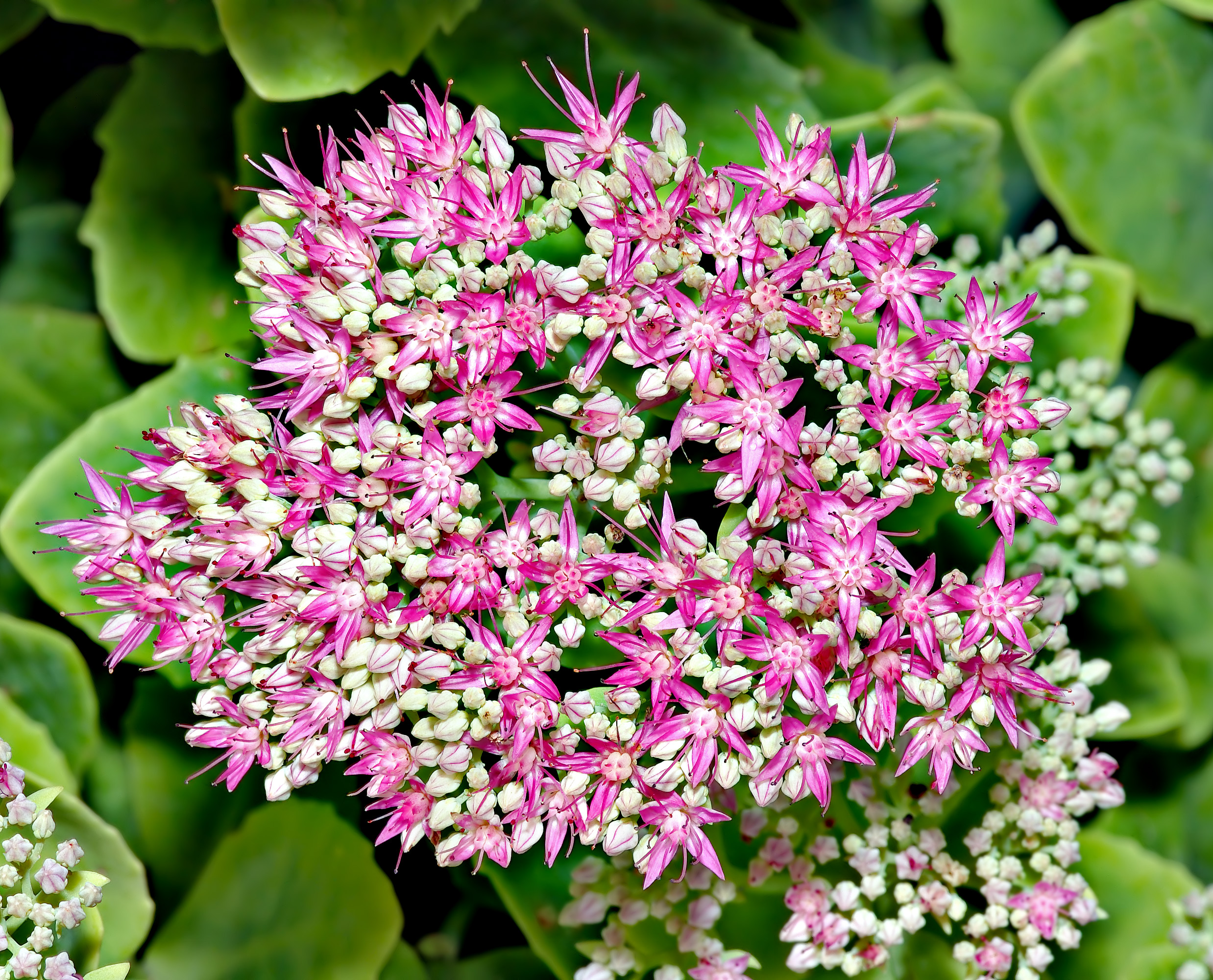
- Hylotelephium spectabile

Scientific classification
- Kingdom: Plantae
- Clade: Embryophytes
- Clade: Tracheophytes
- Clade: Angiosperms
- Clade: Eudicots
- Order: Saxifragales
- Family: Crassulaceae
- Subfamily: Sempervivoideae
- Genus: Hylotelephium; H.Ohba

Type species
- Hylotelephium telephium (L.) H.Ohba

Species
- See text

= Hylotelephium =

Genus of flowering plants

Hylotelephium is a genus of flowering plants in the stonecrop family Crassulaceae. It includes about 33 species distributed in Asia, Europe, and North America.

Species in the genus, formerly included in Sedum, are popular garden plants, known as sedum, stonecrop, live-for-ever, or orpine. Horticulturalists have hybridised many of the species to create new cultivars. Many of the newer ones are patented, so may not be propagated without a license.

== Taxonomy ==
Hylotelephium telephium and related species have been considered in a number of different ways since first being described by Linnaeus in 1753, including as a section of Sedum by Gray in 1821, or a subgenus. But these taxa are quite distinct from Sedum morphologically.

Hylotelephium is one of a group of genera that form a separate lineage from Sedum, and is closely related to Orostachys, Meterostachys, and Sinocrassula.

The separation and recognition of Hypotelephium as a genus separate from Sedum has varied over time. As of March 2025, Plants of the World Online (POWO) and World Flora Online both recognise the genus Hylotelephium, with both documenting 28 accepted species. In horticulture, plants may often still be referred to as Sedum, with which they remain closely related.

== Species ==
The following species are recognised in the genus Hylotelephium:

| Image | Scientific name | Distribution |
|---|---|---|
| | Hylotelephium anacampseros | Southwestern Europe |
| | Hylotelephium angustum | |
| | Hylotelephium × bergeri | |
| | Hylotelephium bonnafousii | |
| | Hylotelephium callichromum | |
| | Hylotelephium cauticola | Hokkaido, Japan |
| | Hylotelephium cyaneum | |
| | Hylotelephium erythrostictum | Japan, Korea, Russia and China. |
| | Hylotelephium ewersii | |
| | Hylotelephium maximum | |
| | Hylotelephium mingjinianum | |
| | Hylotelephium pallescens | China, Japan, Korea, Mongolia, Russia |
| | Hylotelephium pluricaule | |
| | Hylotelephium populifolium | |
| | Hylotelephium sieboldii | Japan |
| | Hylotelephium sordidum | |
| | Hylotelephium spectabile | China and Korea. |
| | Hylotelephium sukaczevii | |
| | Hylotelephium tatarinowii | |
| | Hylotelephium telephioides | US extends from Georgia to Illinois and New York, and it has introduced populations in Ontario. |
| | Hylotelephium telephium | Eurasia. |
| | Hylotelephium tianschanicum | |
| | Hylotelephium uralense | |
| | Hylotelephium ussuriense | |
| | Hylotelephium verticillatum | China, Japan, Korea, Russia |
| | Hylotelephium viride | |
| | Hylotelephium viviparum | |

== Hybrids ==
- Hylotelephium hybrids

== Etymology ==
Hylotelephium means 'woodland distant lover'. 'Hylo' is derived from Greek, meaning 'forest' or 'woodland'. 'Telephium', also derived from Greek, means 'distant-lover'; the plant was thought to be able to indicate when one's affections were returned.

== Bibliography ==
- Gledhill, David (2006). The names of plants (4th ed.). Cambridge: Cambridge University Press. ISBN 0521866456. Archived from the original on 2023-02-08.
- Gray, Samuel Frederick (1821). "Sedum b. Telephium". A natural arrangement of British plants: according to their relations to each other as pointed out by Jussieu, De Candolle, Brown, &c. 2 vols. London: Baldwin, Cradock, and Joy. pp. ii: 539–540. Archived from the original on 2014-02-24.
- Thiede, J; Eggli, U (2007). "Crassulaceae". In Kubitzki, Klaus (ed.). Berberidopsidales, Buxales, Crossosomatales, Fabales p.p., Geraniales, Gunnerales, Myrtales p.p., Proteales, Saxifragales, Vitales, Zygophyllales, Clusiaceae Alliance, Passifloraceae Alliance, Dilleniaceae, Huaceae, Picramniaceae, Sabiaceae. Springer. pp. 83–119. ISBN 978-3540322146. Archived from the original on 2023-02-08. (full text at Archived 2020-10-19 at the Wayback Machine ResearchGate)
- Mayuzumi, Shinzo; Ohba, Hideaki (2004). "The Phylogenetic Position of Eastern Asian Sedoideae (Crassulaceae) Inferred from Chloroplast and Nuclear DNA Sequences". Systematic Botany. 29 (3): 587–598. doi:10.1600/0363644041744329. ISSN 0363-6445. JSTOR 25063994. S2CID 84319808.
- Ohba, Hideaki (March 1977). "The taxonomic status of Sedum telephium and its allied species (Crassulaceae)". The Botanical Magazine Tokyo. 90 (1): 41–56. doi:10.1007/BF02489468. S2CID 22239507.
- Fu, Kunjun; Ohba, Hideaki; Gilbert, Michael G. (2004). "Hylotelephium H. Ohba". p. 209. Archived from the original on 12 November 2014., in Flora of China online vol. 8
- "Sedum 'Purple Emperor'". Plant Finder: Gardening Help. Missouri Botanical Garden. Archived from the original on 27 October 2017.
- TPL (2013). "The Plant List Version 1.1: Hylotelephium". Royal Botanic Gardens, Kew and Missouri Botanical Garden. Archived from the original on 28 April 2020.
