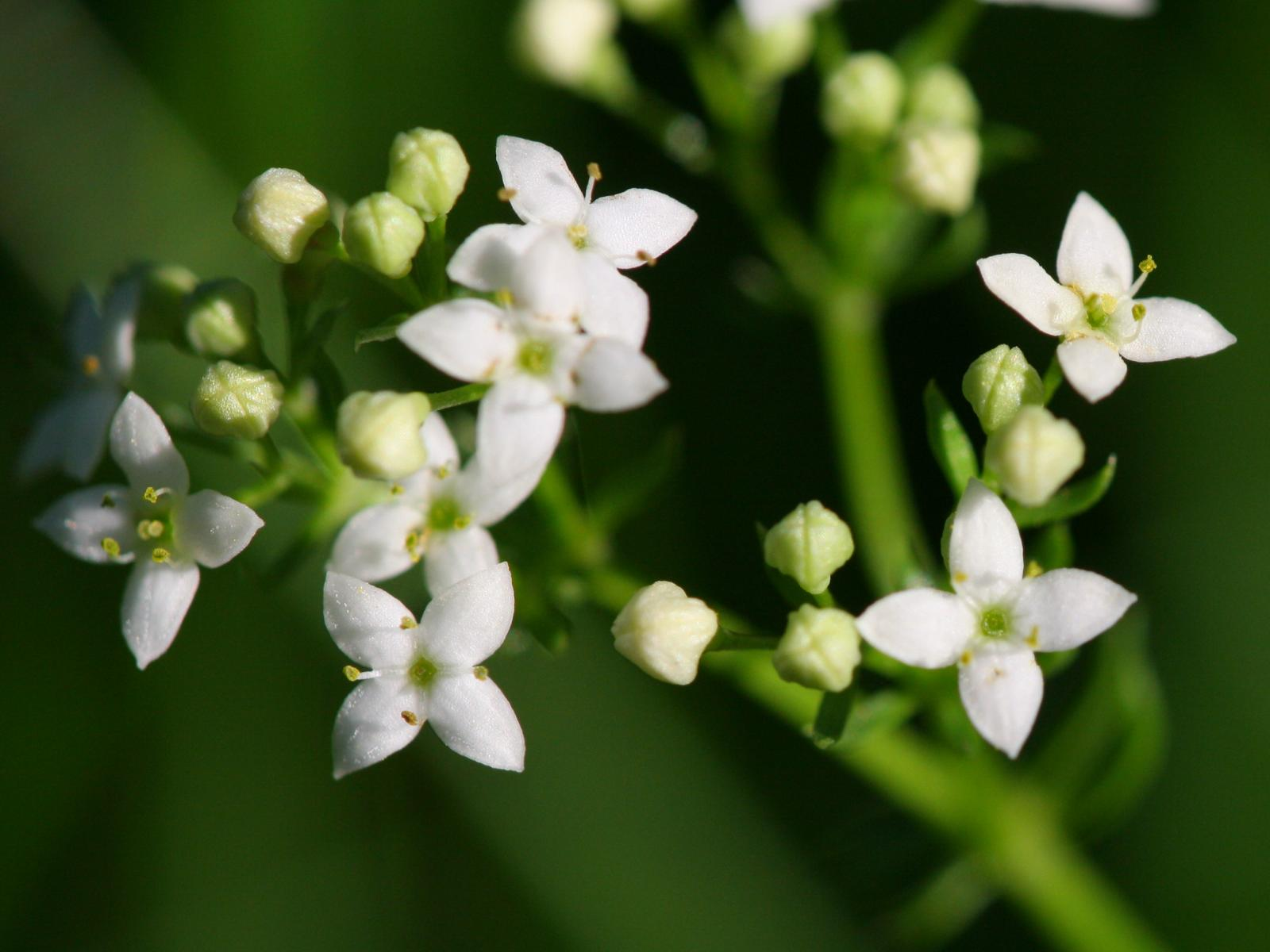

Scientific classification
- Kingdom: Plantae
- Clade: Tracheophytes
- Clade: Angiosperms
- Clade: Eudicots
- Clade: Asterids
- Order: Gentianales
- Family: Rubiaceae
- Genus: Galium
- Species: G. saxatile

Binomial name
- Galium saxatile L.

Synonyms
- Galium hercynicum Weigel

= Galium saxatile =

Heath bedstraw

Species of flowering plant

Galium saxatile or heath bedstraw is a species of flowering plant in the family Rubiaceae. It is related to cleavers.

Galium saxatile is a perennial mat-forming herb, found on grassland, moors, heaths and woods. It can reach a height of 20 centimetres (7.9 in), and flowers in the UK from May to August. The stems are hairless and four sided. Its leaves are 8–25 millimetres (0.31–0.98 in) long, with 6–8 per whorl, and are lanceolate or obovate in shape. The mountain ringlet butterfly uses the plant for nectar.

Galium saxatile avoids calcareous substrate and mainly grows on light siliceous soils and is widespread across much of northern and central Europe from Portugal and Ireland to Scandinavia, France, Germany, Poland, Ukraine and Russia. It is also reportedly sparingly naturalized in Quebec, California and the Falkland Islands.

== Gallery ==
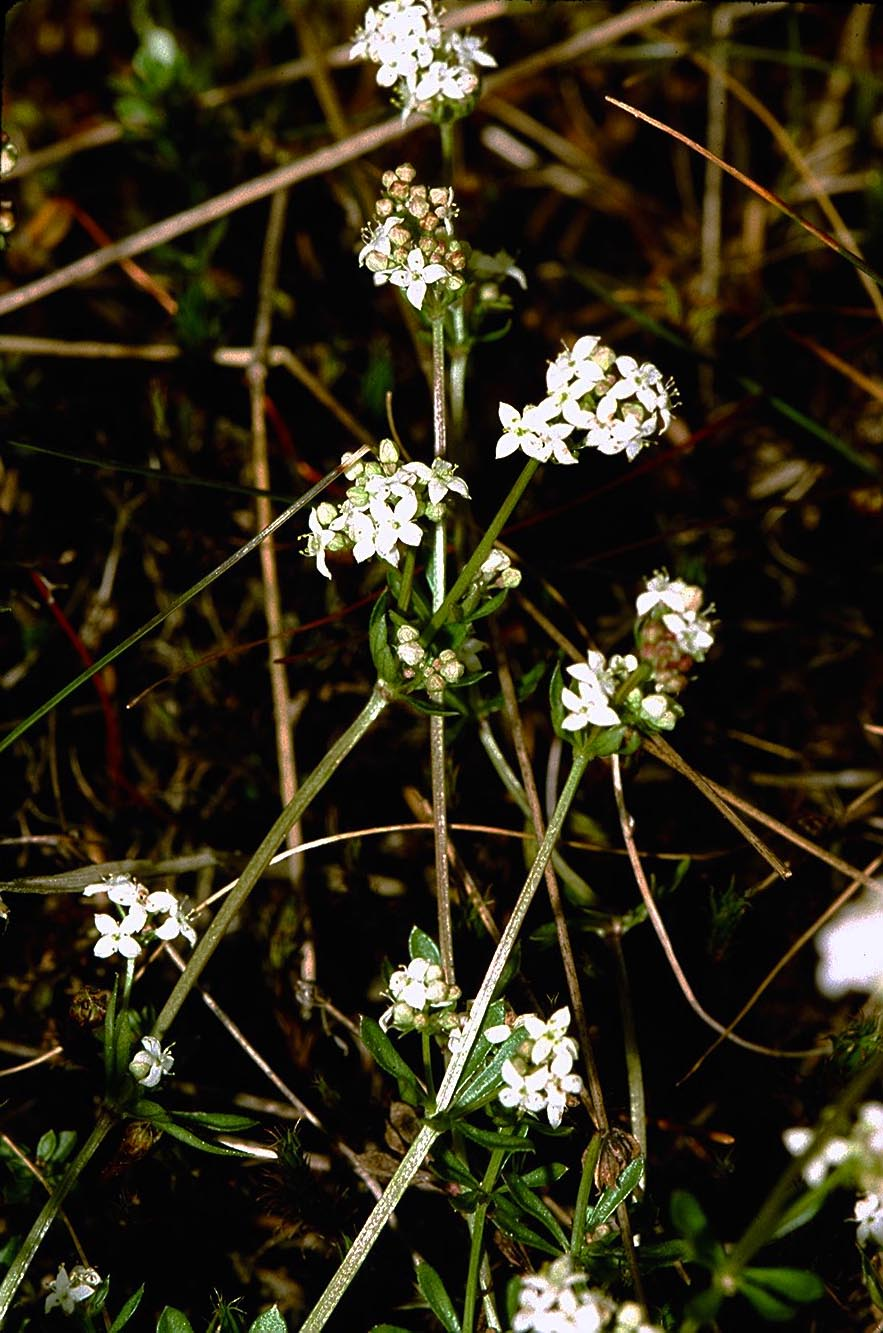

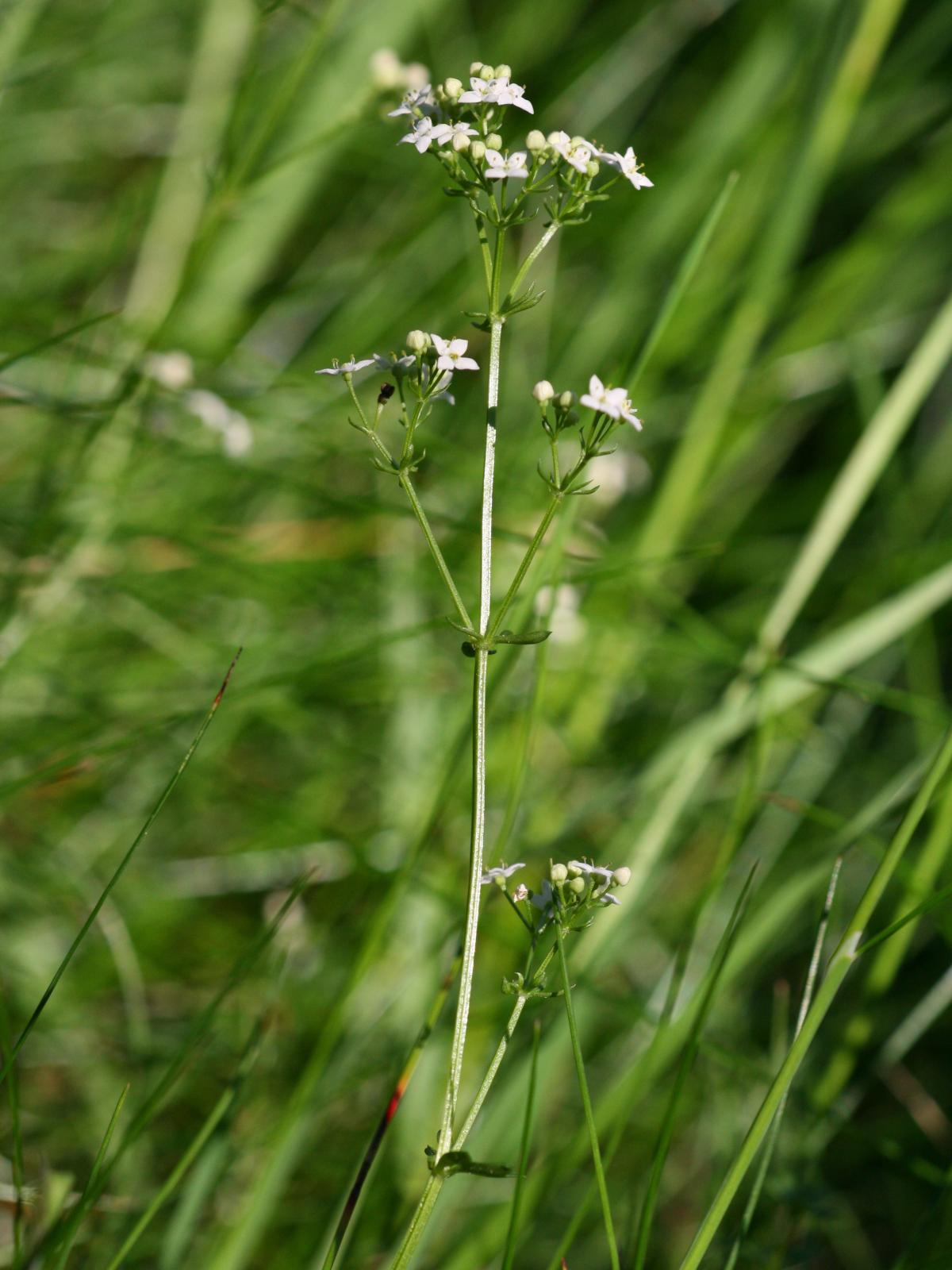

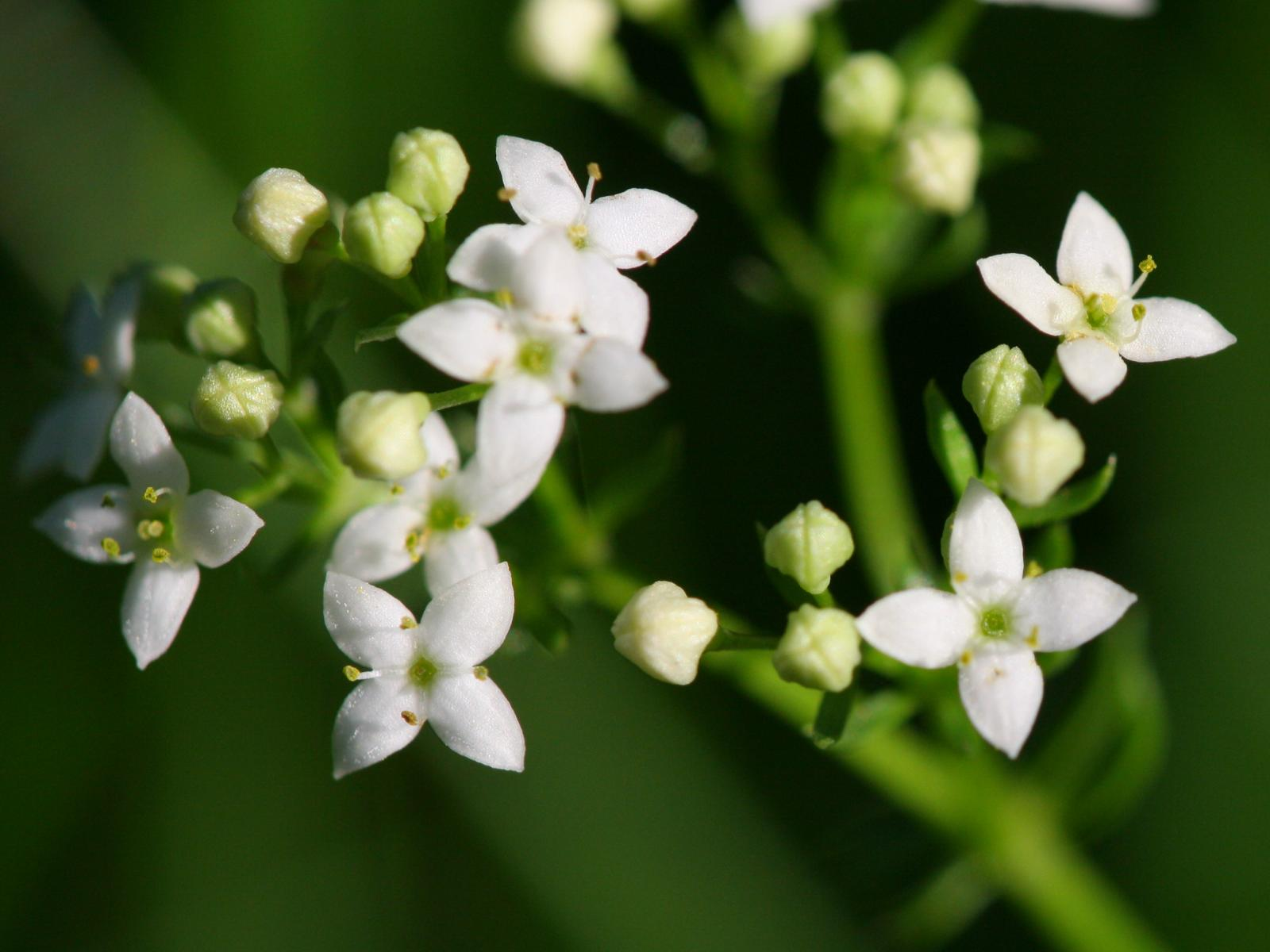
