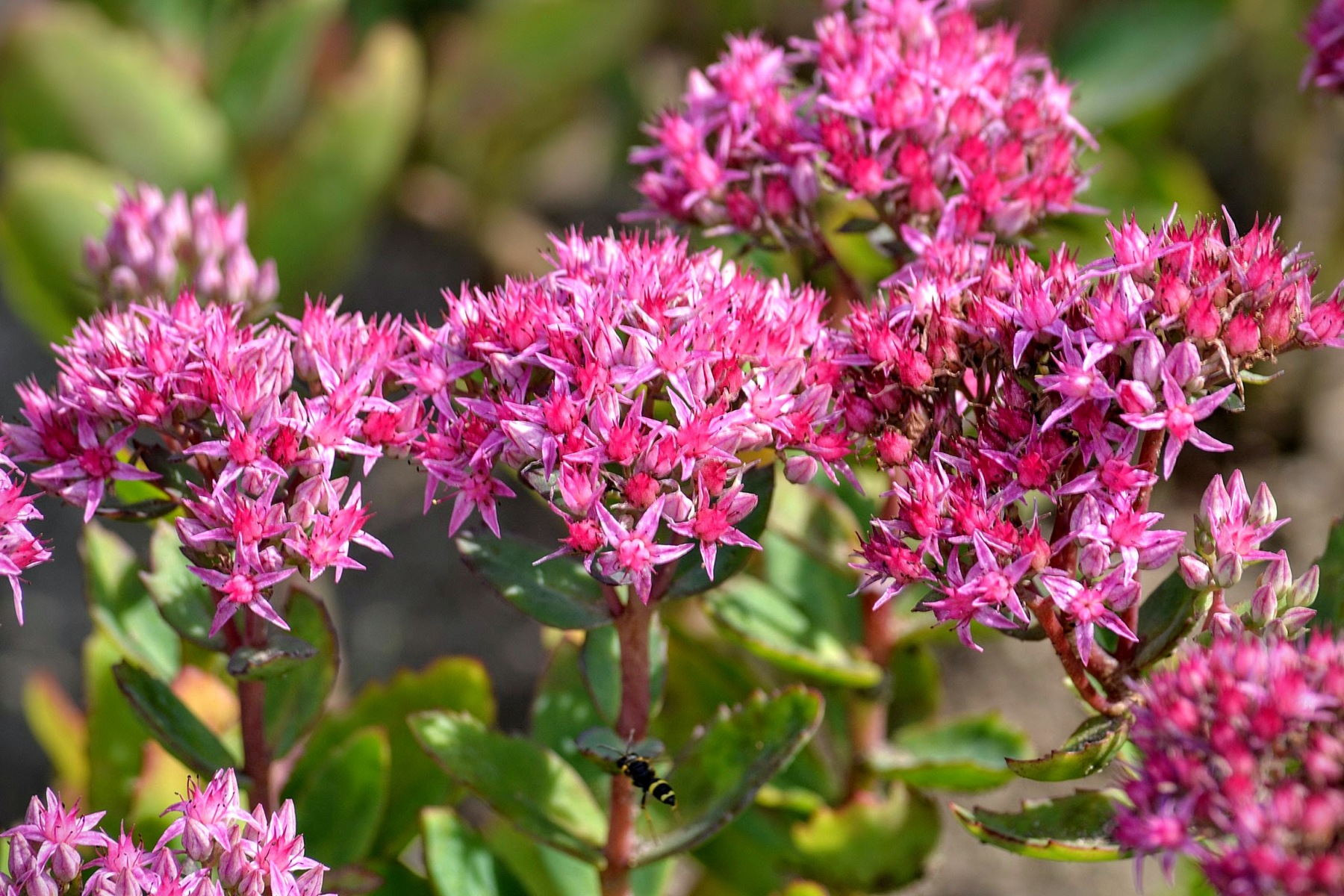
- Inflorescences
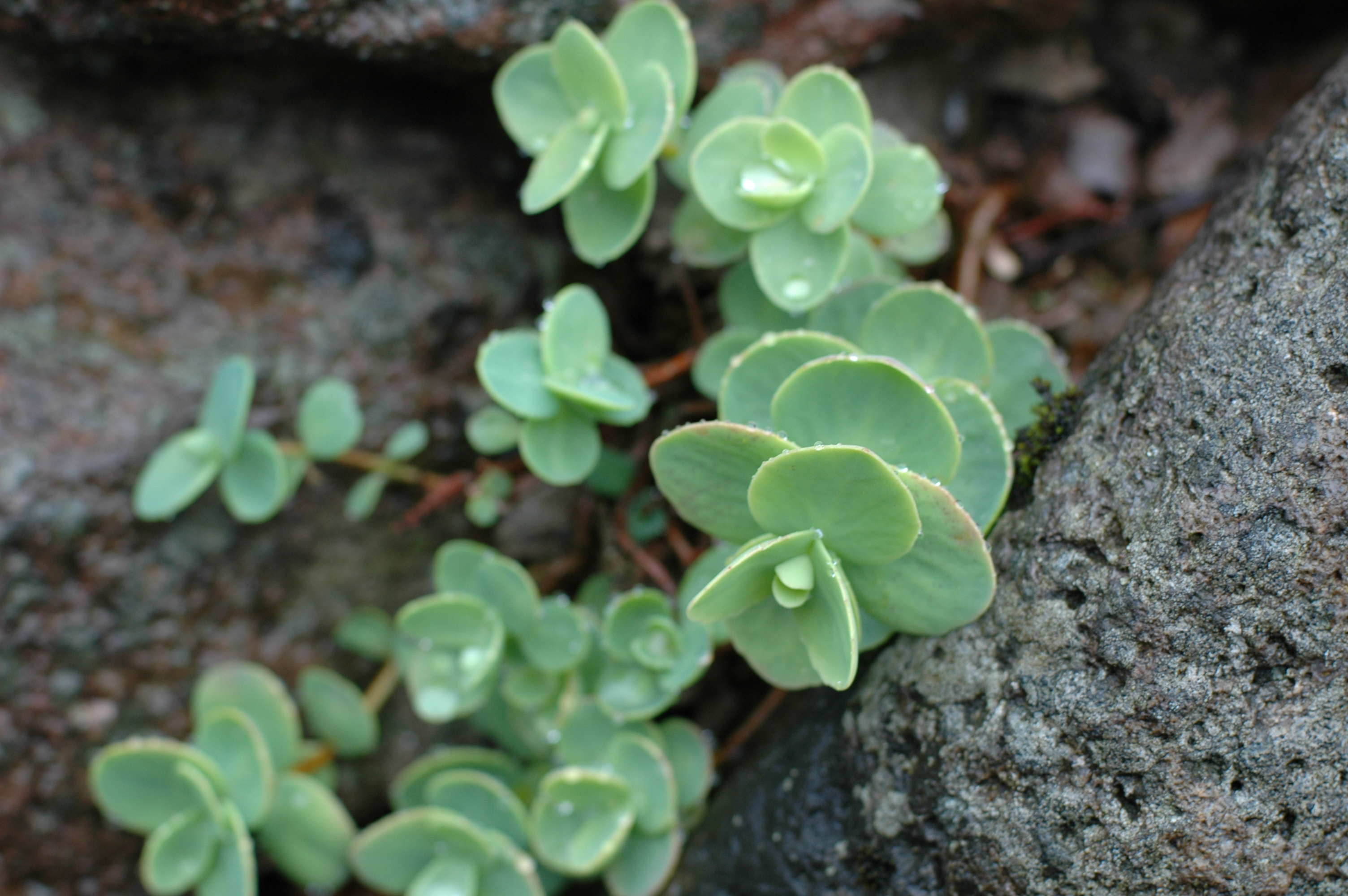
- Foliage

Scientific classification
- Kingdom: Plantae
- Clade: Tracheophytes
- Clade: Angiosperms
- Clade: Eudicots
- Order: Saxifragales
- Family: Crassulaceae
- Genus: Hylotelephium
- Species: H. ewersii

Binomial name
- Hylotelephium ewersii (Ledeb.) H.Ohba

Synonyms
- List: Hylotelephium pakistanicum (G.R.Sarwar) Holub; Sedum azureum Royle; Sedum ewersii Ledeb.; Sedum ewersii var. cyclophyllum Priszter; Sedum gerardianum Wall. ex Royle; Sedum pakistanicum G.R.Sarwar; Sedum rubrum Royle

= Hylotelephium ewersii =

Species of plant

Hylotelephium ewersii (syn. Sedum ewersii), the pink Mongolian stonecrop or pink sedum, is a species of flowering plant in the family Crassulaceae. It is native to the high mountains of Asia, including the Altai, Tian Shan, and western Himalayas, and it has been introduced elsewhere, particularly to Scandinavia. A deciduous perennial reaching 15 cm (6 in), it is typically found in forests or in rocky crevices in ravines at elevations from 1,800 to 2,500 m (5,900 to 8,200 ft). With its pink flowers and succulent blue‑gray leaves, and hardy to USDA zone 2, it has found use as a ground cover.

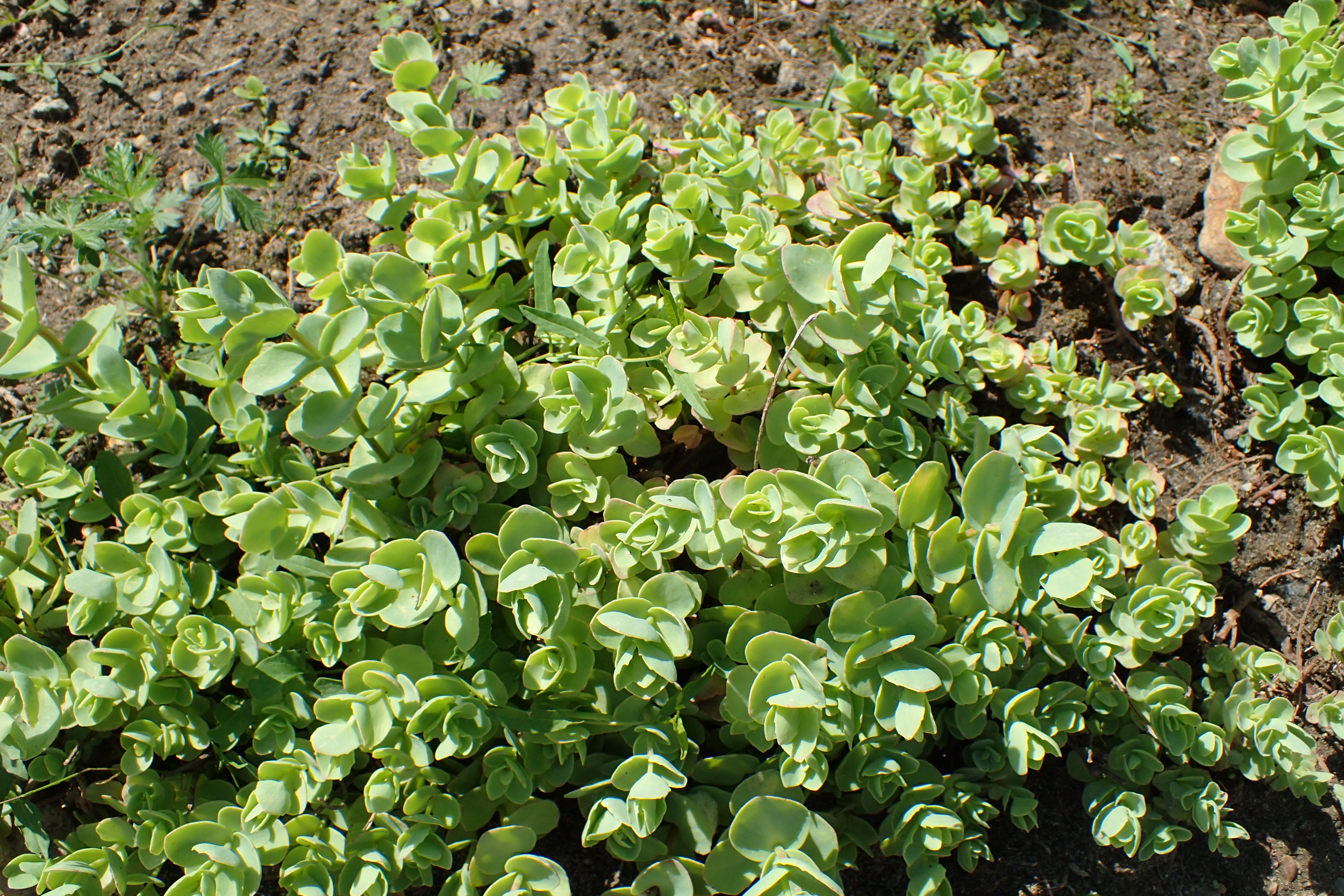
Habit

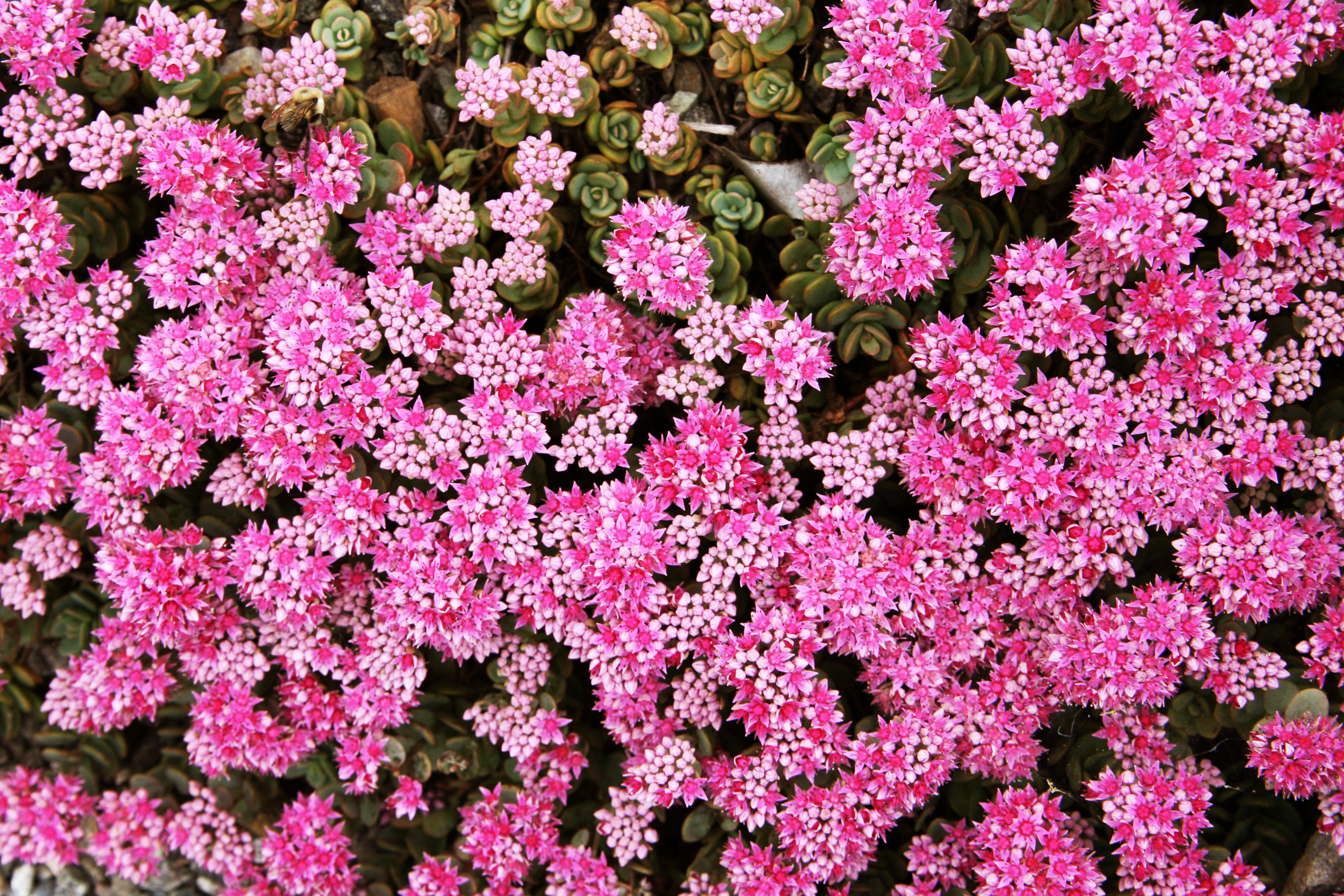
Mass effect

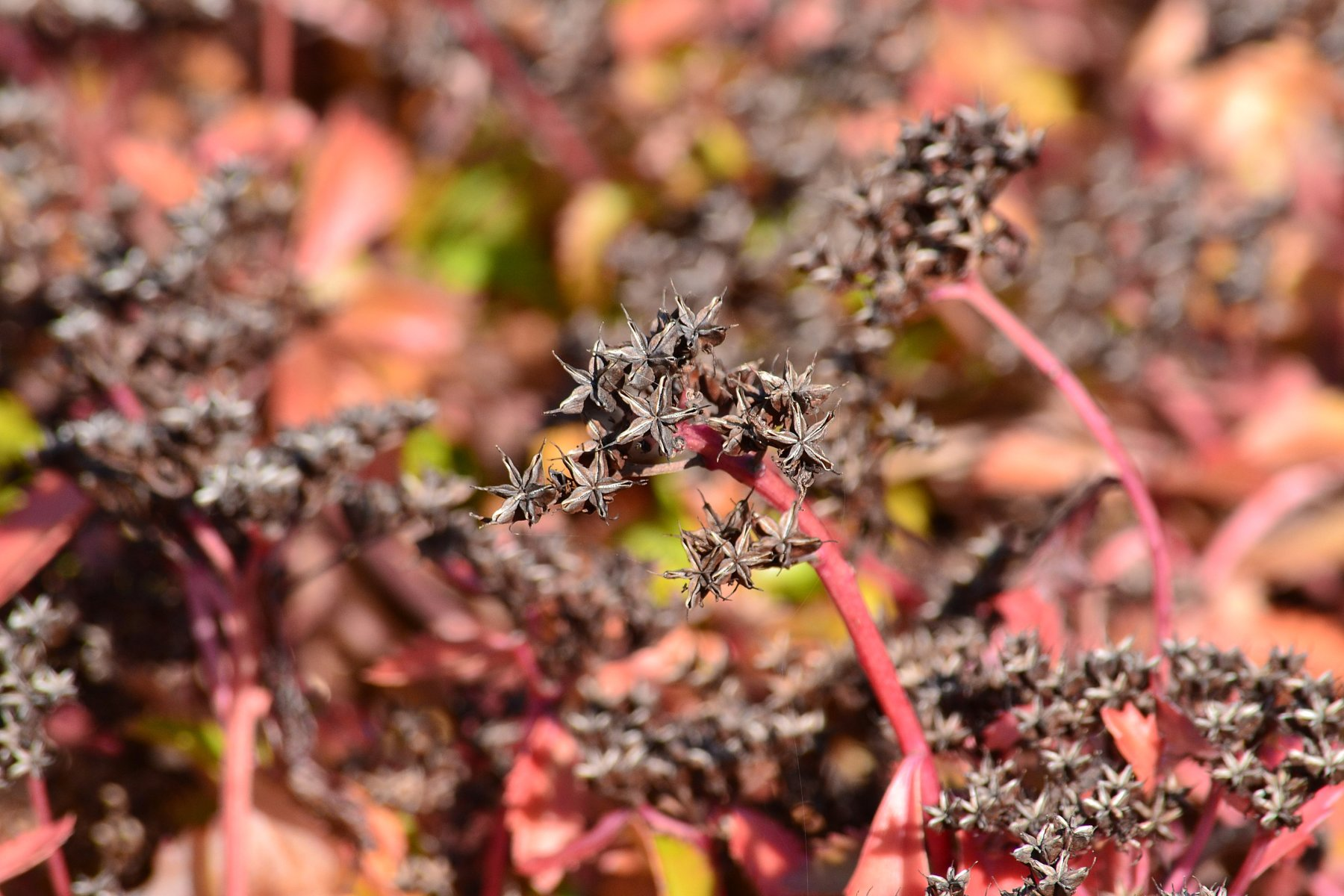
Gone to seed
