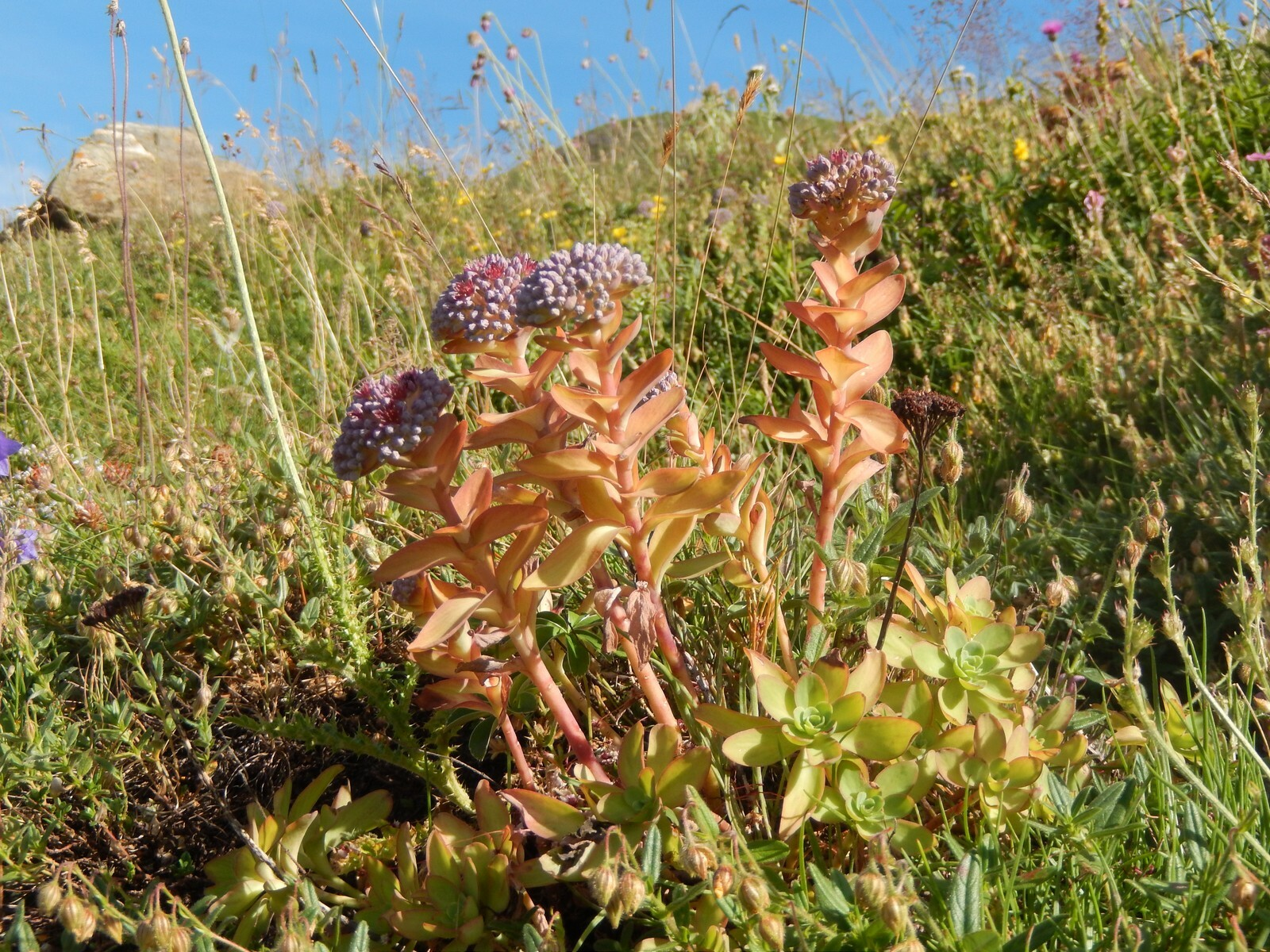

Scientific classification
- Kingdom: Plantae
- Clade: Tracheophytes
- Clade: Angiosperms
- Clade: Eudicots
- Order: Saxifragales
- Family: Crassulaceae
- Genus: Hylotelephium
- Species: H. anacampseros

Binomial name
- Hylotelephium anacampseros (L.) H.Ohba

= Hylotelephium anacampseros =

Species of flowering plant

Hylotelephium anacampseros, the love-restoring stonecrop, is a species of flowering plants in the family Crassulaceae. This perennial plant grows on sunny rocky terrains, in mountains of southwestern Europe.

== Description ==
They are succulent perennial plants with thick, woody underground stems. They have both erect flowering stems and sterile shoots, the latter ending in a tuft of leaves. They grow up to 10–30 cm (3.9–11.8 in) in height.

Leaves (12–30 mm long, 5–12 mm wide) have a rounded to spatulate shape, with entire margin and obtuse apex, narrowed at the base, sessile, fleshy, glaucous green in color, alternate.

Flowers are grouped in shperical, compressed cymes resembling corymbs. They have 5–6 obtuse petals 8–12 mm long, red or purple on the upside, lilac with a green keel on the underside; and 5–6 acute sepals 4 mm long.

Floral morphology

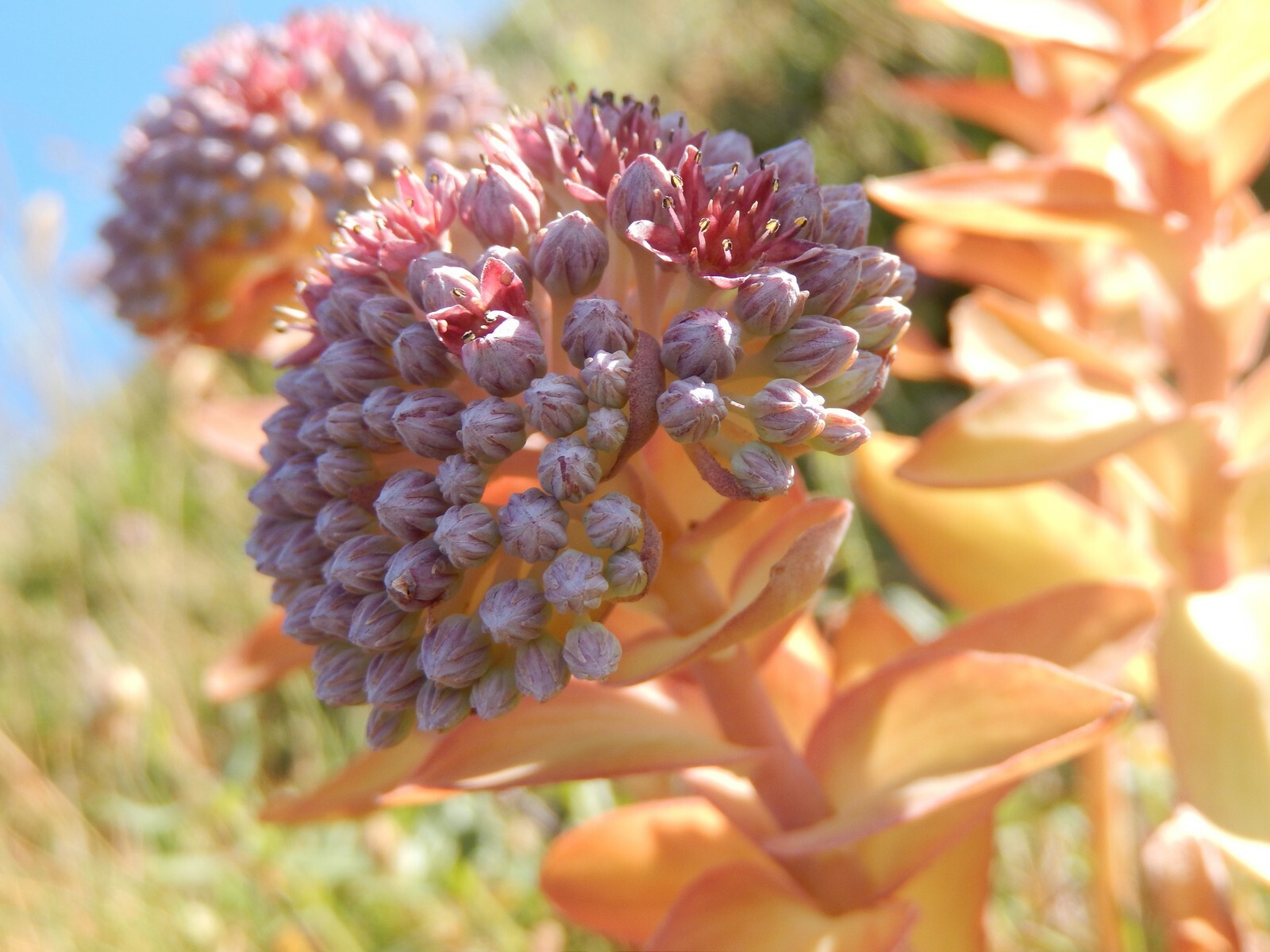
Inflorescence

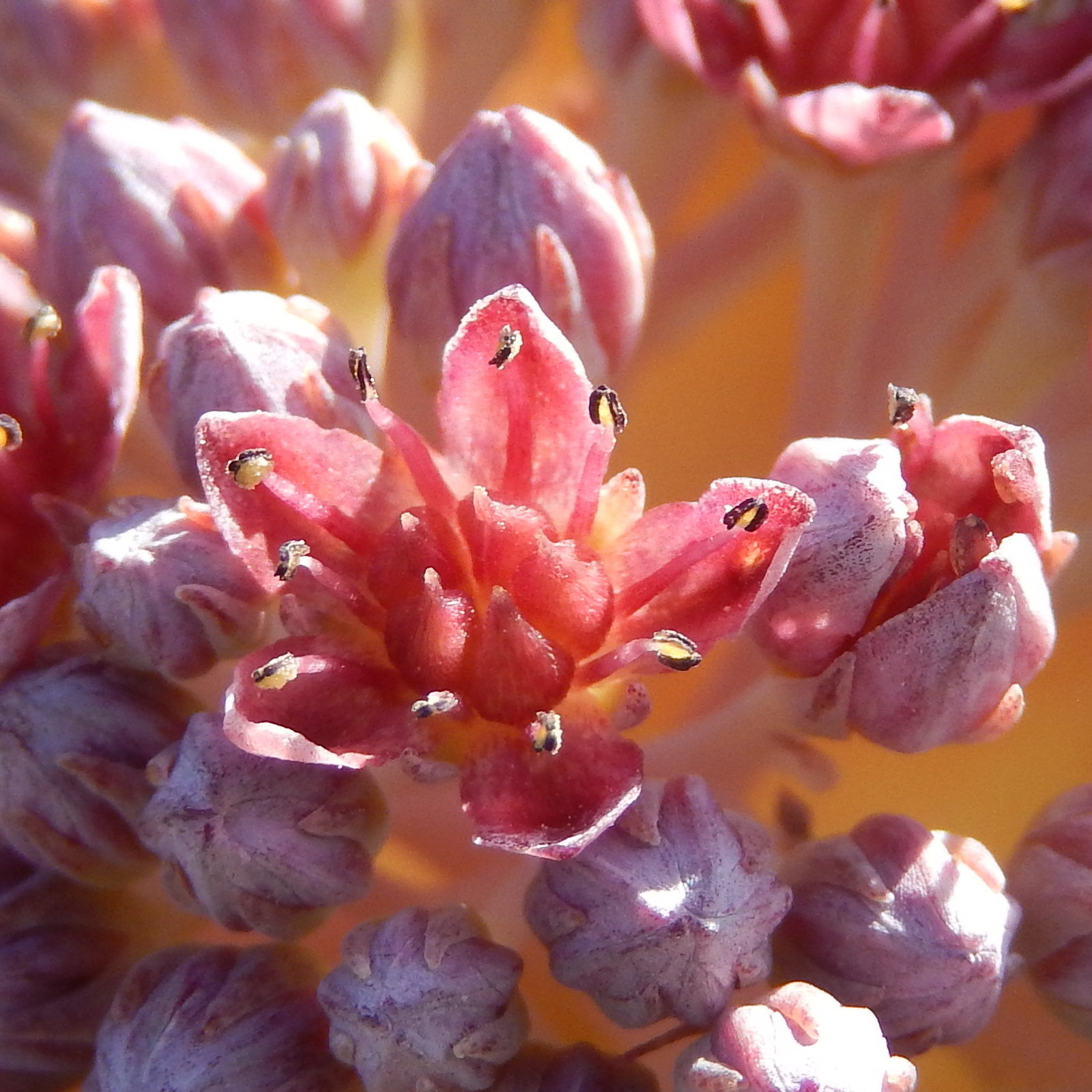
Flower

== Distribution and habitat ==
It is a southwestern European species, growing in sunny, rocky habitats with siliceous soil from 1,000 to 2,700 m (3,300 to 8,900 ft) above sea level.

== Ecology ==
Hylotelephium anacampseros is a perennial plant species that flowers from June to August.
