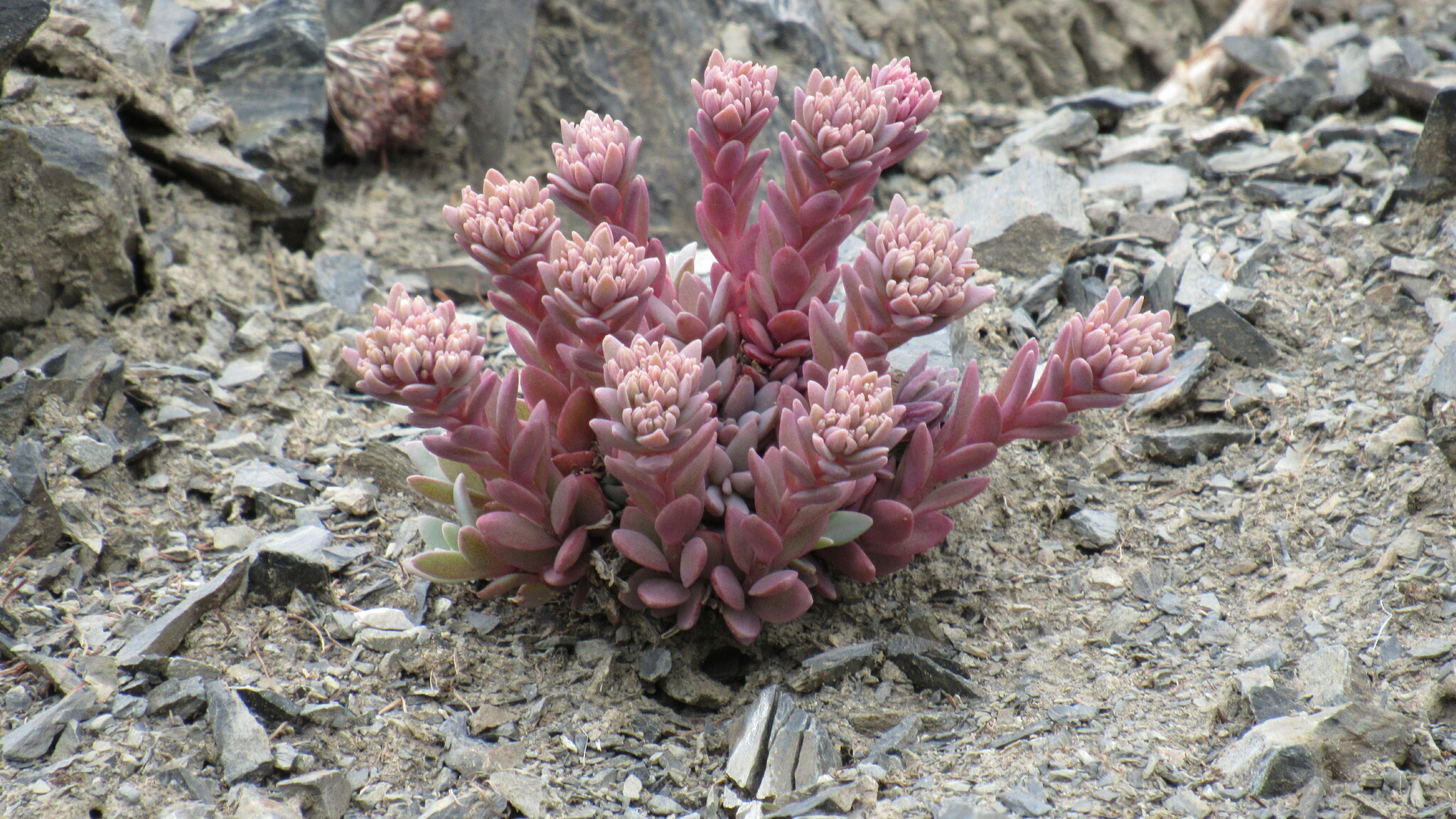

Scientific classification
- Kingdom: Plantae
- Clade: Tracheophytes
- Clade: Angiosperms
- Clade: Eudicots
- Order: Saxifragales
- Family: Crassulaceae
- Genus: Hylotelephium
- Species: H. cyaneum

Binomial name
- Hylotelephium cyaneum (Rudolph) H.Ohba

Synonyms
- List: Sedum cyaneum L.; Hylotelephium takasui (Kudô) H.Ohba; Sedum cyaneum Rudolph; Sedum dahuricum Stephan ex Boriss.; Sedum lilacinum Ledeb.

= Hylotelephium cyaneum =

Species of plant

Hylotelephium cyaneum (syn. Sedum cyaneum), commonly known as the azure stonecrop, is a perennial mat-forming succulent groundcover plant of the family Crassulaceae. Its native range is in eastern Siberia and Russian Far East.

== Description ==
It has short dark red stems with fleshy grey leaves with a hint of purple. It flowers in late summer and early autumn. It can be used in gravel or rock gardens and as a patio or container plant.
