= Penicillium albidum =

Scientific classification
- Kingdom: Fungi
- Division: Ascomycota
- Class: Eurotiomycetes
- Order: Eurotiales
- Family: Aspergillaceae
- Genus: Penicillium
- Species: P. albidum

Binomial name
- Penicillium albidum Sopp, O.J. 1912

Type strain
- VKM F-3923

Species of fungus

Penicillium albidum is an anamorph fungus species of the genus of Penicillium which was isolated from volcanic soils in the south of Chile. Penicillium albidum produces the antibiotic Albidin.

== See also ==
- List of Penicillium species
