= Midsummer men =

Midsummer men is a common name for several plants in the family Crassulaceae and may refer to:

- Hylotelephium telephium
- Rhodiola rosea
