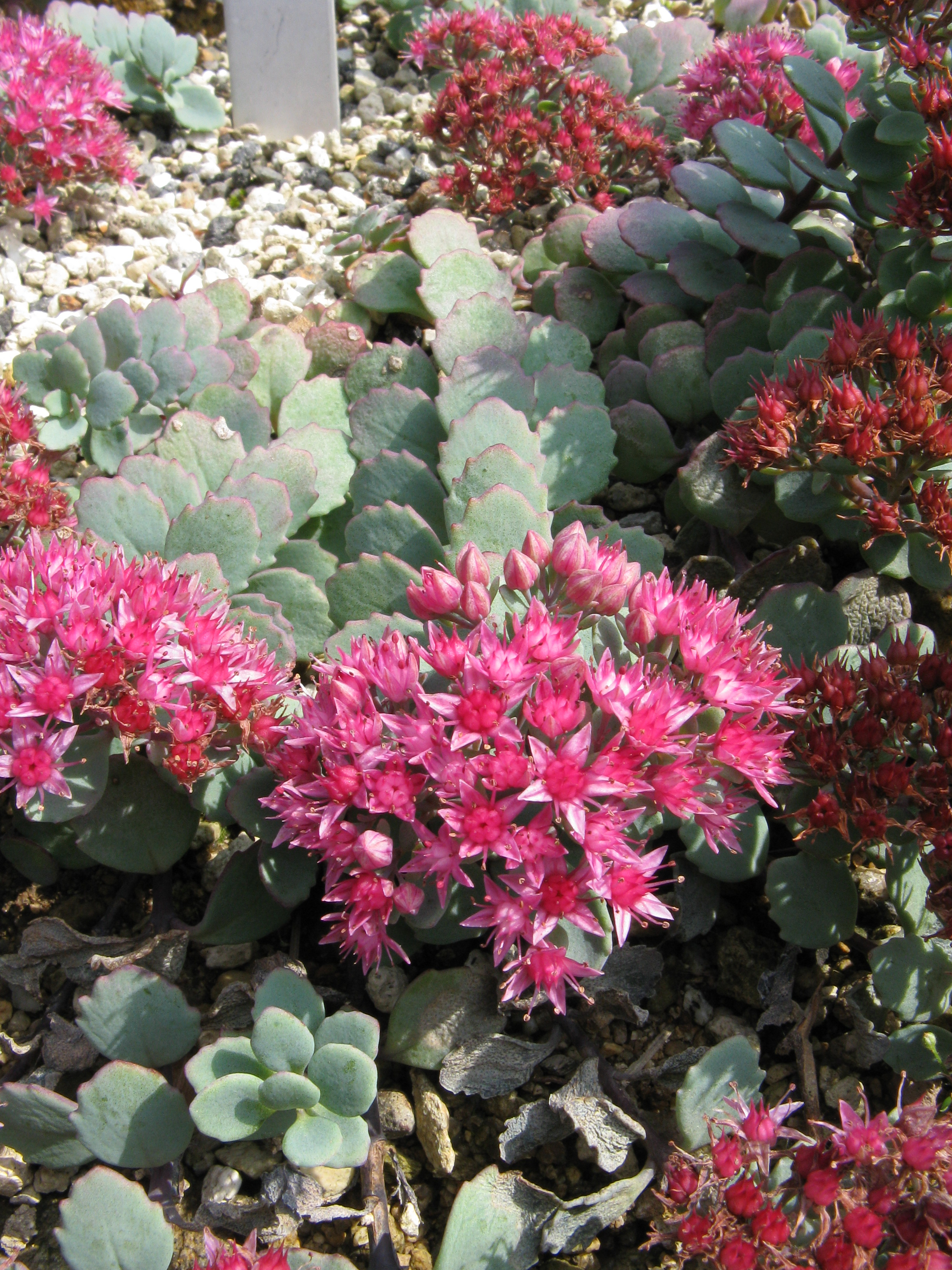

Scientific classification
- Kingdom: Plantae
- Clade: Tracheophytes
- Clade: Angiosperms
- Clade: Eudicots
- Order: Saxifragales
- Family: Crassulaceae
- Genus: Hylotelephium
- Species: H. cauticola

Binomial name
- Hylotelephium cauticola (Praeger) H.Ohba

Synonyms
- Sedum cauticola Praeger

= Hylotelephium cauticola =

Species of succulent

Hylotelephium cauticola, the cliff stonecrop, syn. Sedum cauticola, is a species of flowering plant in the family Crassulaceae, native to Hokkaido, Japan. Growing to 8 cm (3 in) tall by 30 cm (12 in) wide, it is a carpet-forming succulent perennial with trailing stems of pink-tinged grey-green round leaves, and purplish pink star-shaped flowers in autumn.

The specific epithet cauticola means "growing on cliffs", referring to the plant's favoured habitat.

It is grown in rock gardens and alpine gardens in alkaline to neutral soil. It has gained the Royal Horticultural Society's Award of Garden Merit.
