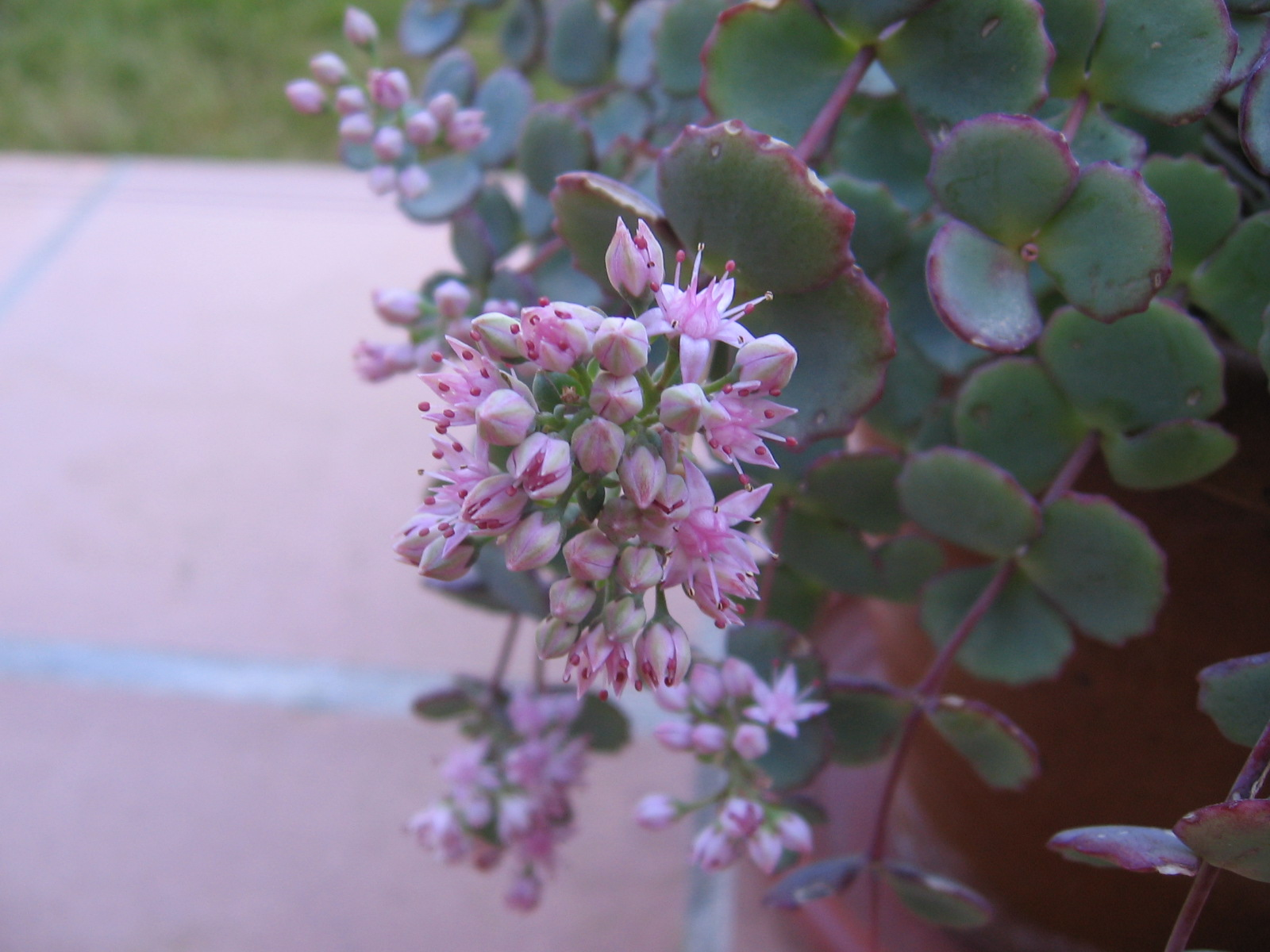

Scientific classification
- Kingdom: Plantae
- Clade: Tracheophytes
- Clade: Angiosperms
- Clade: Eudicots
- Order: Saxifragales
- Family: Crassulaceae
- Genus: Hylotelephium
- Species: H. sieboldii

Binomial name
- Hylotelephium sieboldii (Swect ex Hk.) H. Ohba

Synonyms
- Sedum sieboldii

= Hylotelephium sieboldii =

Species of succulent

Hylotelephium sieboldii (syn. Sedum sieboldii), the October stonecrop, Siebold's stonecrop, Siebold's sedum or October daphne, is a species of flowering plant in the family Crassulaceae, native to Japan. Growing to 10 cm (4 in) high by 20 cm (8 in) wide, this trailing deciduous perennial produces its round glaucous leaves in whorls of 3 around the delicate stems. The hot-pink flowers appear in autumn (fall).

The specific epithet sieboldii commemorates Philipp Franz von Siebold, a notable German plant collector of the 19th century.

This plant requires some protection from low temperatures in winter, and is often seen in cultivation as a houseplant or in an alpine garden. The cultivar 'Misebaya-nakafu' has variegated green and cream leaves, and has gained the Royal Horticultural Society's Award of Garden Merit.
