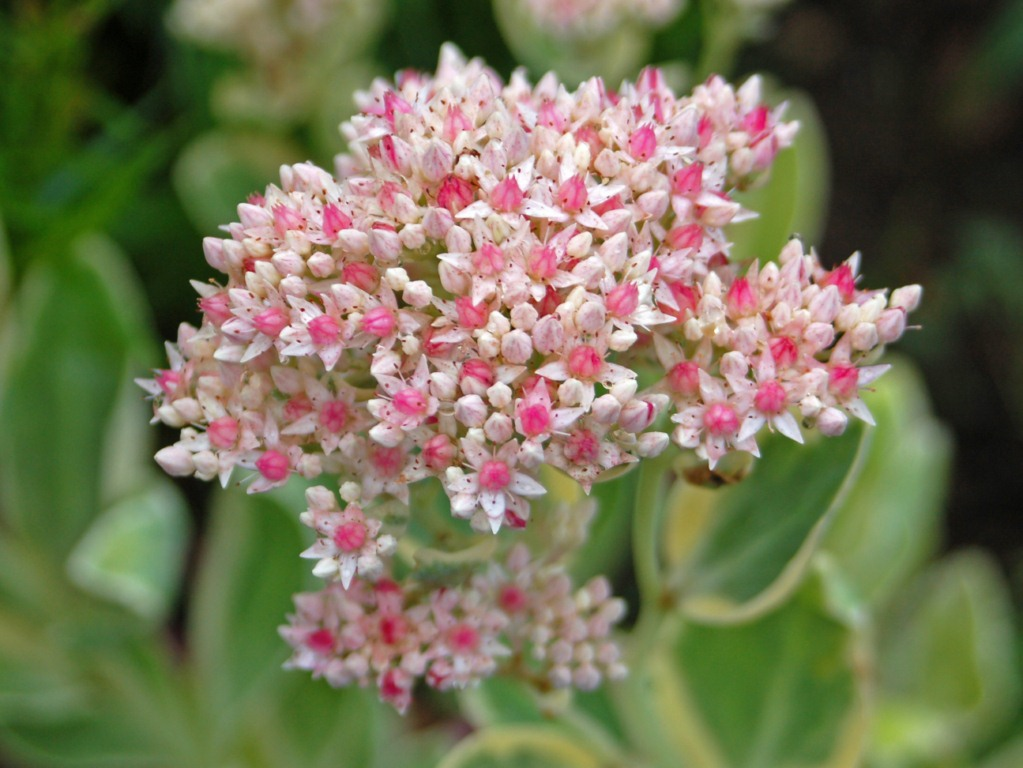

Scientific classification
- Kingdom: Plantae
- Clade: Tracheophytes
- Clade: Angiosperms
- Clade: Eudicots
- Order: Saxifragales
- Family: Crassulaceae
- Genus: Hylotelephium
- Species: H. erythrostictum

Binomial name
- Hylotelephium erythrostictum (Miq.) H. Ohba

Synonyms
- Sedum alboroseum Baker; Sedum erythrostictum Miq.; Sedum labordei H. Lév. & Vaniot; Sedum telephium subsp. alboroseum (Baker) Fröd.

= Hylotelephium erythrostictum =

Species of succulent

Hylotelephium erythrostictum, commonly known as garden stonecrop, is a herbaceous perennial plant in the genus Hylotelephium, belonging to the family Crassulaceae.

== Description ==
Hylotelephium erythrostictum reaches on average a height of 30–70 centimetres (12–28 in). The stem is simple and the leaves are opposite, sessile, oblong, and succulent, about 5–7 centimetres (2.0–2.8 in) long. The flat cymes bear many white or pale pink tiny flowers of about 1 centimetre (0.39 in) of diameter, with lanceolate petals. The flowering period extends from September through October in the Northern Hemisphere.

== Distribution ==
It is native to Japan, Korea, Russia and China.

== Habitat ==
This plant grows in grasslands, meadows, hillsides, and ravines. It prefers fertile well-drained soil, at elevations between 400 metres (1,300 ft) and 1,700 metres (5,600 ft) above sea level.
