= List of vineyard soil types =

The soil composition of vineyards is one of the most important viticultural considerations when planting grape vines. The soil supports the root structure of the vine and influences the drainage levels and amount of minerals and nutrients that the vine is exposed to. The ideal soil condition for a vine is a layer of thin topsoil and subsoil that sufficiently retains water but also has good drainage so that the roots do not become overly saturated. The ability of the soil to retain heat and/or reflect it back up to the vine is also an important consideration that affects the ripening of the grapes.

There are several minerals that are vital to the health of vines that all good vineyard soils have. These include calcium which helps to neutralize the soil pH levels, iron which is essential for photosynthesis, magnesium which is an important component of chlorophyll, nitrogen which is assimilated in the form of nitrates, phosphates which encourages root development, and potassium which improves the vine metabolisms and increases its health for next year's crop.

== List of soil terms ==
Unless otherwise noted the primary reference for this list is Sotheby's Wine Encyclopedia 2005

=== A–C ===
- Albariza – Formed by diatomaceous deposits. Found in southern Spain
- Alluvium – Highly fertile soil that has been transported by a river. Often contains gravel, sand and silt.
- Basalt – Volcanic rock that is high in calcium, iron, and magnesium. Variable potassium and little or no quartz.
- Boulbènes[fr] – Fine siliceous soil that is easily compressed and common in the Entre-Deux-Mers region of Bordeaux.
- Brickearth – See under Loess.
- Calcareous soil – Alkaline soil with high levels of calcium and magnesium carbonate. Soil typically cool in temperature and that provides good water retention and drainage. Calcareous clay soils have high limestone content, which neutralizes the natural acidity of the soil. However, the cool temperatures of the soil normally delay ripening in the grape, which tends to produce more acidic wines.
- Carbonaceous soil – Soil produced through the anaerobic decomposition of rotting vegetation. This type of soil includes anthracite, coal, lignite and peat.
- Chalk – Very porous soft limestone soil that vine roots can easily penetrate. It provides good drainage and works best for grapes with high acidity levels.
- Clay – Sedimentary rock-based soil that has good water-retention ability but poor drainage. The soil is often very cool and high in acidity. The Right Bank of Bordeaux is dominated by clay-based soils.

=== D–H ===
- Dolomite – Calcium-magnesium carbonate soil.
- Flint – Siliceous stone that reflects and retains heat well. The Pouilly-Fumé wine of the Loire Valley is generally produced from flint-based soil and is said to have "gun-flint" smell in the wine.
- Galestro – Schist based soil found in the Tuscany region of Italy.
- Granite – Composed of 40–60% quartz, 30–40% Orthoclase and various amounts of hornblende, mica, and other minerals. This soil warms quickly and retains heat well. The soil's high level of acidity works to minimize the acid levels in the grapes which works well with acidic grapes like Gamay. It is the main soil type of the Brand region of Alsace.
- Gravel – Loose siliceous pebble soil that has good drainage but poor fertility. Vines planted in this type of soil must penetrate deeply to try to and find nutrients in the subsoil. Wine made from vines produces on clay gravel beds have less acidity than those planted on limestone gravel beds. The Graves and Sauternes regions of Bordeaux consist predominantly of gravel-based soil.
- Greywacke – Sedimentary soil formed by rivers depositing quartz, mudstone and feldspar. It is found in vineyards of Germany, New Zealand and South Africa.
- Gypsum – Calcium sulfate based soil that is formed through the evaporation of seawater. It is a high absorbent soil that has average drainage ability.
- Hardpan – A dense layer of clay or other material that is impermeable to water. In some areas of Bordeaux, a sandy iron-rich layer is located deep enough below the surface to act as a water table for the vine.

=== I–Q ===
- Keuper – Soil type consisting of marl and limestone common in Alsace, dating to the Upper Triassic period.
- Kimmeridgian soil – A gray-colored limestone-based soil originally identified in Kimmeridge, England. Kimmeridgian clay is calcareous clay containing Kimmeridgian limestone. This is the principal soil type of the Loire Valley, Champagne and Burgundy regions.
- Lignite – Soil type used as fertilizer in Germany and Champagne. It is a brown-colored carbonaceous soil that is intermediate between peat and coal.
- Limestone – Sediment-based soil consisting of carbonates. The most common colored limestone found in wine-producing area is buff-gray in color (with the exception of white chalk). The water-retention abilities vary by composition, but limestone is consistently alkaline and is generally planted with grapes of high acidity levels. This is the main soil type in the Zinnkoepflé region of Alsace.
- Llicorella – A soil type found in the Priorat appellation of Spain. The soil is a mix of slate and quartz that dates to the Paleozoic era. The soil is very porous and drains well. Syrah, Grenache and Carignan have done well in this soil type.
- Loam – Warm, soft, fertile soil composed of roughly equal amounts of silt, sand and clay. It is typically too fertile for high-quality wines that need to limit yields in order to concentrate flavors.
- Loess – A very fine, predominantly silty soil composed of wind-borne sediment that is typically angular and decalcified. Commonly known as brickearth in the UK, the soil is very fertile and has good water retention and warming properties, but drains poorly.
- Marl – Calcareous-clay-based soil that adds acidity to the wine. Vines planted in this type of soil normally ripen later than in other soil types. Marl soil is typically deep and lacking in stone fragments; it is the main soil type in the Piedmont wine region of Italy. Marlstone is the indurated (well cemented) metamorphic form of Marl.
- Mica – Silicate-based soil composed of fine, decomposed rock formations.
- Muschelkalk -Soil type consisting of various compositions of sandstone, marl, dolomite, and shingle common in Alsace dating back from the Middle Triassic period.
- Perlite – A volcanic soil type that is light, powdery and lustrous with properties similar to diatomaceous earth.
- Quartz – Common material found in most vineyard soils—especially sand and silt-based soils. The high soil pH of quartz can reduce the acidity of the resulting wines, but its heat-retaining property (it stores and reflects heat) can increase ripening of the grape, which can result in wine of higher alcohol content.

=== S–Z ===
- Sand – Warm, airy soil that is composed of tiny particles of weathered rocks. One of the few soils that the phylloxera louse does not thrive in, the soil drains well but does not have good water retention. Sandstone is a sedimentary soil composed of sand particles that has been pressured bound by various iron-based minerals. This is the main soil type of Kitterlé in Alsace.
- Schist – Laminated, crystalline-rock-based soil that retains heat well and is rich in magnesium and potassium but is poor in organic nutrients and nitrogens.
- Shale – Fine-grain sediment-based soil that can turn into slate when under pressure. The soil is moderately fertile and retains heat well.
- Siliceous soil – Soil composed of acid rock that is crystalline in nature. The soil has good heat retention but needs the added composition of silt, clay and other sedimentary soils to have any kind of water retention. The range of this soil can include organic materials like Kieselguhr and flint, or inorganic materials like quartz. This soil type covers half of the wine regions of Bordeaux.
- Silt – Soil type consisting of fine grain deposits that offer good water retention but poor drainage. It is more fertile than sand.
- Silex – A flint- and sand-based soil type found primarily in the Loire Valley that is a formed from a mixture of clay, limestone and silica.
- Slate – Soil type that is the most common found in the Mosel region. Slate is a metamorphic, plate-like rock formed when shale, clay, or siltstone is subjected to pressure deep within the earth. The soil retains heat well and warms up relatively quickly.
- Steige – A schist-based soil found in the Andlau region of Alsace. In the Alsace Grand Cru AOC of Kastelberg, the soil has metamorphosed with granite sand to form a hard, dark slate-like stone.
- Terra Rossa – A sedimentary soil known as "Red Earth" that is formed after carbonates have been leached out of limestone. The breakdown leaves behind iron deposits which oxidize and turn the soil a rustic red color. This soil type is found in some areas along the Mediterranean and in Coonawarra. The soil drains well and is relatively high in nutrients. Australian winemakers have found some success with Cabernet Sauvignon plantings.
- Tufa – A highly friable calcareous bedrock that breaks down into a fine crumb structure.
- Ultisol – A highly weathered, largely infertile, clay-based soil—usually brilliant red in color—found in the American South.
- Volcanic soil – Soil that is derived from one of two volcanic activities. 1.) Vent-based soil is formed from rock material (including pumice and tuff) that has been ejected into the air and cooled before settling to the earth. 2.) Lava-based soil is the product of lava flows from the volcano. Ninety percent of lava-based soil is composed of basalt with the other ten percent composed of andesite, pitchstone, rhyolite, and trachyte.
