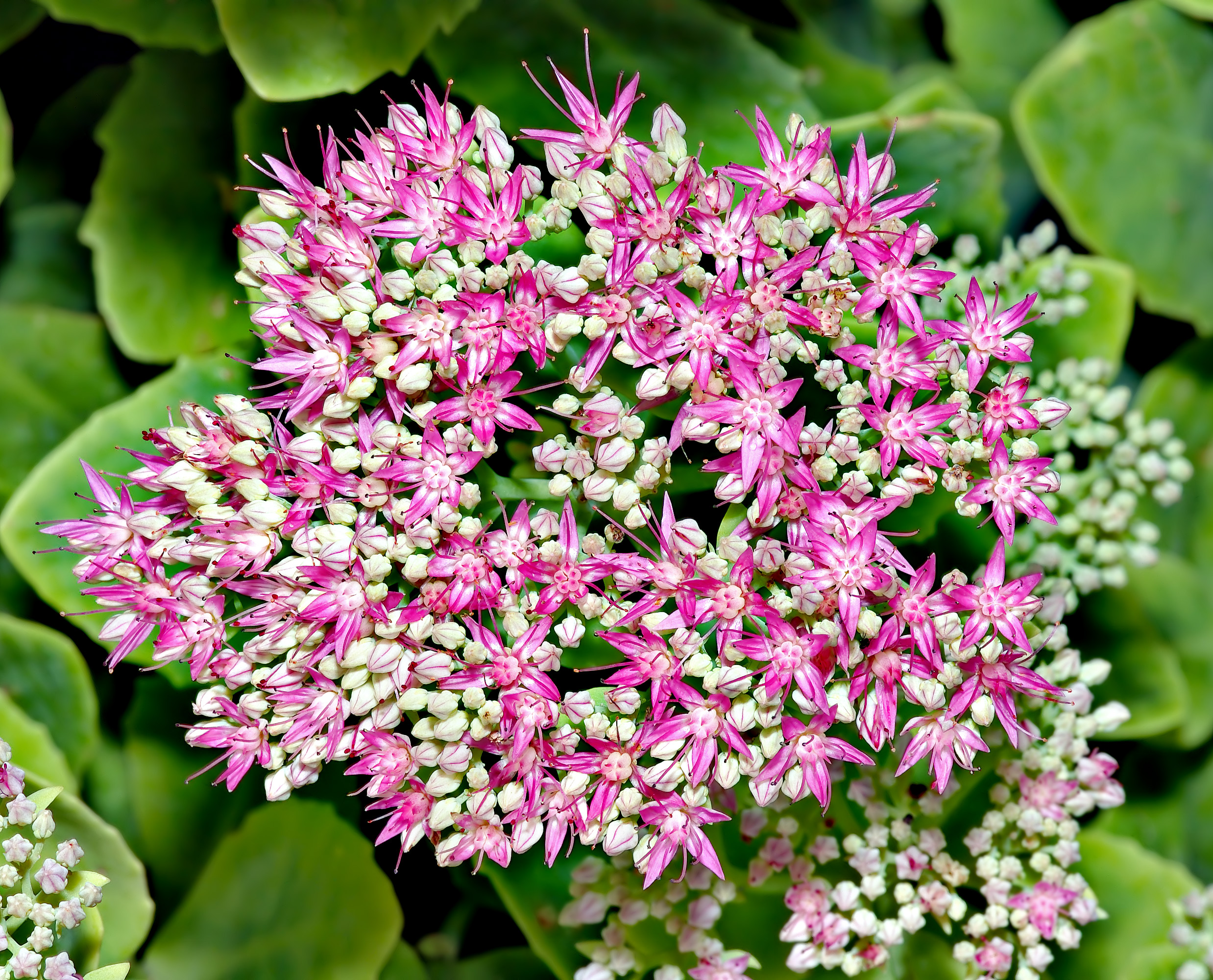

Scientific classification
- Kingdom: Plantae
- Clade: Tracheophytes
- Clade: Angiosperms
- Clade: Eudicots
- Order: Saxifragales
- Family: Crassulaceae
- Genus: Hylotelephium
- Species: H. spectabile

Binomial name
- Hylotelephium spectabile (Boreau) H.Ohba

Synonyms
- Sedum spectabile Boreau; Sedum telephium var. kirinense Kom.

= Hylotelephium spectabile =

Species of succulent

Hylotelephium spectabile (syn. Sedum spectabile) is a species of flowering plant in the stonecrop family Crassulaceae, native to China and Korea. Its common names include showy stonecrop, iceplant, and butterfly stonecrop.

== Description ==
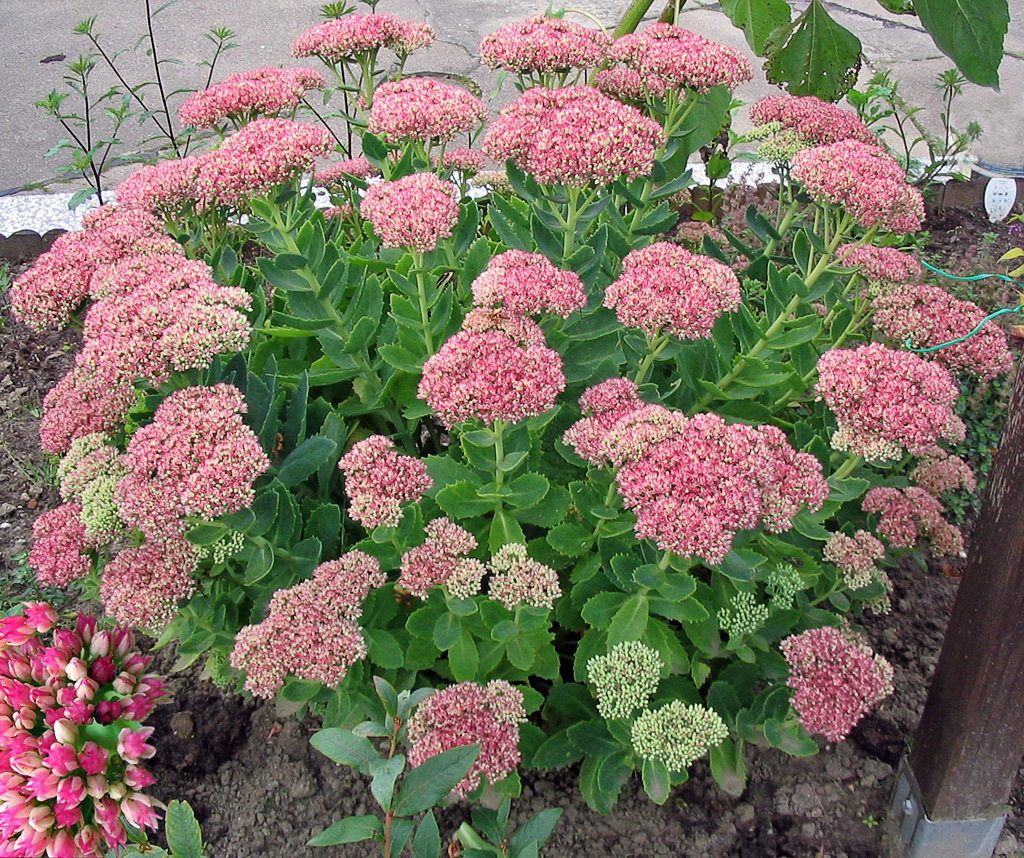
Habitat

Growing to 45 cm (18 in) tall and broad, it is an herbaceous perennial with alternate, simple, toothed leaves on erect, unbranched succulent stems and has a tuber root rhizome. The leaves are usually arranged opposite or in threes, simple and more or less wedge-shaped at the base, and frosted blue above; they are 2.5 to 10 cm long and 0.8 to 5 cm wide. The leaf margin is smooth or serrated towards the tip. Stipules are missing.

The star-shaped pink flowers are borne in flat cymes 15 cm (6 in) across from summer until first frost. The many-flowered, zymous inflorescence is about 7 to 11 cm wide. The hermaphrodite, radially symmetrical flowers have a diameter of about 1 cm and are usually five-fold. The sepals are about 1 cm long. The petals are (rarely 5) usually 6 to 8.5 millimeters long. There are two circles 6 to 8 mm long stamens, which are significantly longer than the petals. The anthers are purple. The free carpels are about 3 mm long. The style is about 1.2 mm long. This self-fertile species is pollinated by insects.

The specific epithet spectabile means "showy".

== Cultivation ==
Hylotelephium spectabile is valued in cultivation, and numerous cultivars have been produced. The species and the cultivar 'Brilliant' have both gained the Royal Horticultural Society's Award of Garden Merit. It was introduced to France in the mid-1860s.

Easily grown in pots, it is widely used in decorative beds, rock gardens in particular, or in pots, especially in China where this plant is very widespread. Its flower is used by florists in the composition of bouquets. It is a full sun, drought tolerant, cold- tolerant honeycomb plant (down to −15 °C (5 °F) when fully established). This sedum multiplies by division in spring.

=== Chemistry ===
It has also been widely used as a laboratory plant where it is studied for its synthesis of sedoheptulose. Phytopurification and phytostabilisation of soils: the effects of heavy metals on the plant and their kinetics in the parts of the plants have been studied.
