= Siliceous soil =

Siliceous soils are formed from rocks that have silica (SiO_{2}) as a principal constituent. The parent material of siliceous soils may include quartz sands, chert, quartzite, quartz reefs, granite, rhyolite, ademellite, dellenite, quartz sandstone, quartz siltstone, siliceous tuff, among others. These parent materials sometimes originate from silica-secreting organisms such as radiolarians, diatoms, or some types of sponges.

== Characteristics ==
Soils high in siliceous parent material typically have:

- lower cation-exchange capacity,
- higher susceptibility to external sources of sodium,
- lower buffering potential,
- higher acidity, and
- higher erodibility

== Agriculture ==
Siliceous soils in vineyard soils have been linked to larger grapes with increased tannin content.

== See also ==
- List of vineyard soil types
