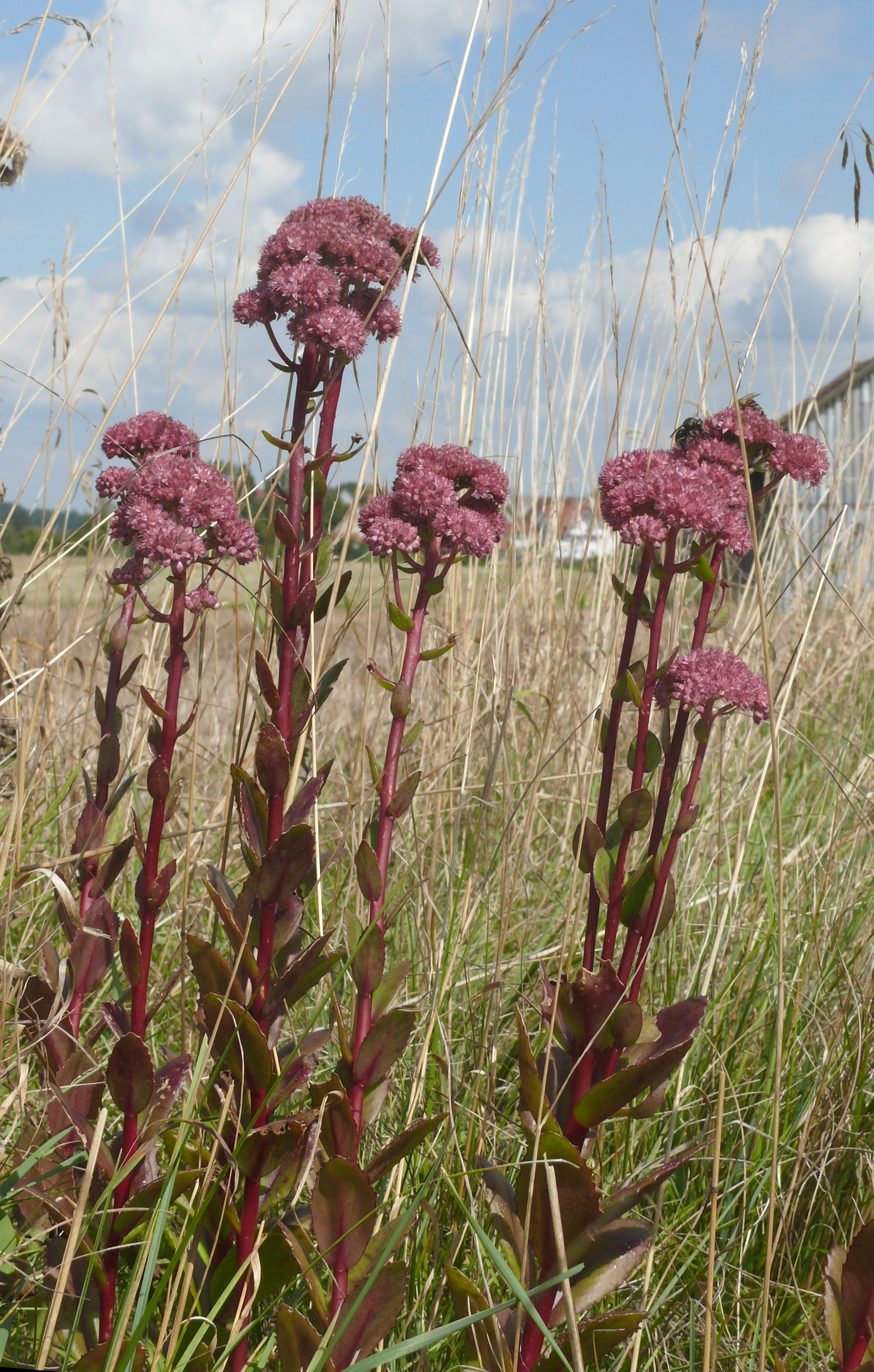
- Hylotelephium telephium subsp. telephium

Scientific classification
- Kingdom: Plantae
- Clade: Tracheophytes
- Clade: Angiosperms
- Clade: Eudicots
- Order: Saxifragales
- Family: Crassulaceae
- Genus: Hylotelephium
- Species: H. telephium

Binomial name
- Hylotelephium telephium (L.) H.Ohba

Subspecies
- 4 - see text

Synonyms
- List: Anacampseros albida Haw. ex DC.; Anacampseros arguta Haw.; Anacampseros aurigerana Jord. & Fourr.; Anacampseros beugesiaca Jord. & Fourr.; Anacampseros borderi Jord. & Fourr.; Anacampseros buxicola Jord. & Fourr.; Anacampseros conferta Jord. & Fourr.; Anacampseros convexa Jord. & Fourr.; Anacampseros dumeticola Jord. & Fourr.; Anacampseros julliana Jord. & Fourr.; Anacampseros lapidicola Jord. & Fourr.; Anacampseros lugdunensis Jord. & Fourr.; Anacampseros monticulorum Jord. & Fourr.; Anacampseros navieri Jord. & Fourr.; Anacampseros praecelsa Jord. & Fourr.; Anacampseros purpurea Haw. ex DC.; Anacampseros pycnantha Jord. & Fourr.; Anacampseros repens Jord. & Fourr.; Anacampseros rhodanensis Jord. & Fourr.; Anacampseros rubella Jord. & Fourr.; Anacampseros rupifraga Jord. & Fourr.; Anacampseros saxifraga Jord. & Fourr.; Anacampseros subalbida Jord. & Fourr.; Anacampseros triphylla Haw.; Anacampseros viridula Jord. & Fourr.; Anacampseros vogesiaca Jord. & Fourr.; Anacampseros vulgaris Haw.; Hylotelephium argutum (Haw.) Holub; Hylotelephium carpaticum (G.Reuss) Soják; Hylotelephium decumbens (Lucé) V.V.Byalt Hylotelephium jullianum; (Boreau) Grulich Hylotelephium maritimum; (Bohuslav) Grulich Hylotelephium purpureum; (L.) Holub Hylotelephium sanguineum; (Ortega) Castrov. & Velayos Hylotelephium triphyllum; (Haw.) Holub Hylotelephium vulgare; (Haw.) Holub Hylotelephium zhiguliense; Tzvelev Sedum argutum; (Haw.) Sweet Sedum carpaticum; G.Reuss Sedum fabaria; W.D.J.Koch nom. illeg. Sedum jullianum; Boreau Sedum maritimum; Bohuslav Sedum mugodscharicum; Boriss. Sedum purpurascens; W.D.J.Koch Sedum purpureum; (L.) Schult. Sedum sanguineum; Ortega Sedum telephium; L. Sedum triphyllum; (Haw.) Gray

= Hylotelephium telephium =

Species of flowering plant in the stonecrop family

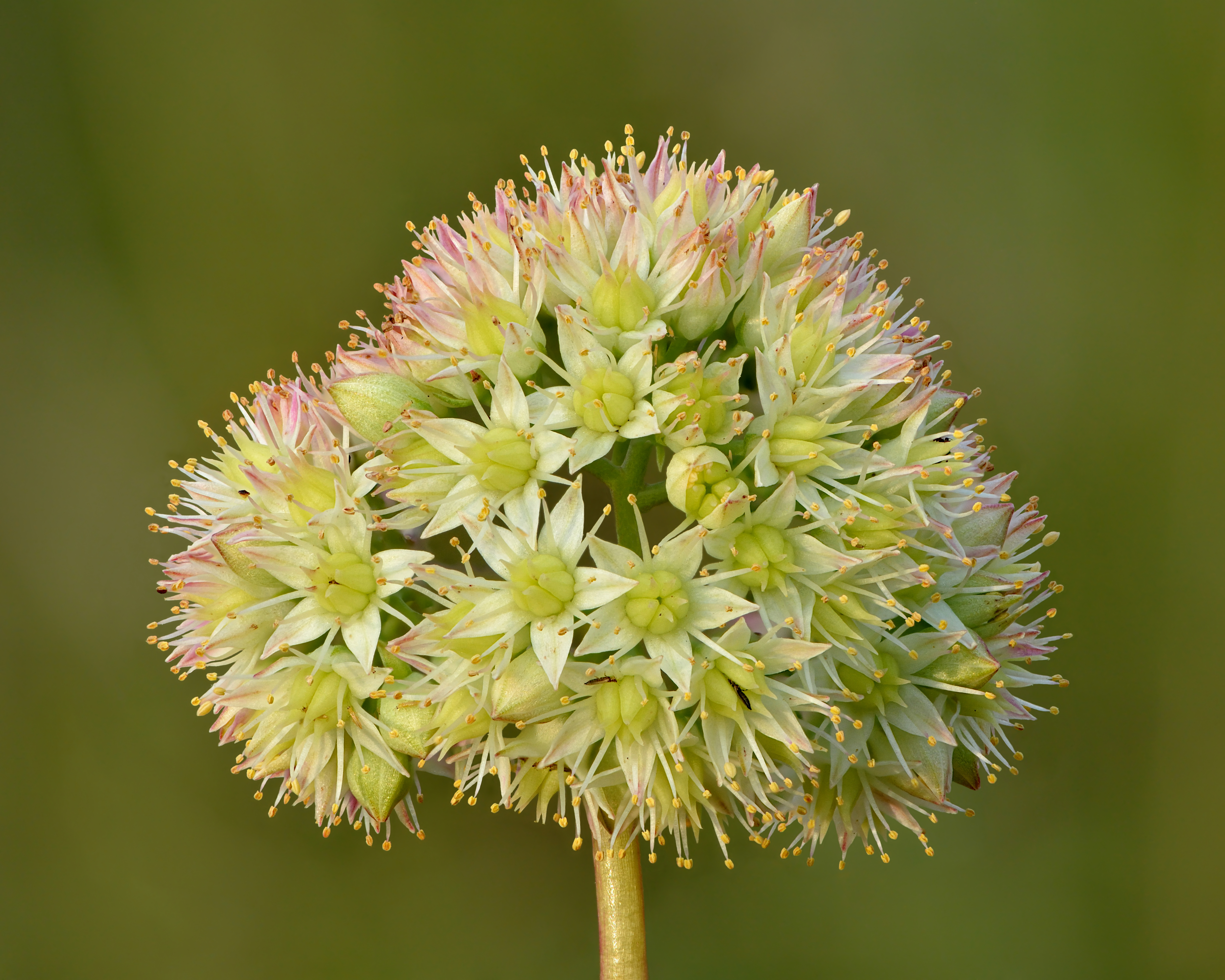
Inflorescence of subsp. maximum

Hylotelephium telephium (synonym Sedum telephium), known as orpine, livelong, frog's-stomach, harping Johnny, life-everlasting, live-forever, midsummer-men, Orphan John, witch's moneybags, and garden stonecrop is a succulent perennial plant of the family Crassulaceae native to Eurasia. The flowers are held in dense heads and can be reddish or yellowish-white. A number of cultivars, often with purplish leaves, are grown in gardens as well as hybrids between this species and the related Hylotelephium spectabile (iceplant), especially the popular 'Herbstfreude' ('Autumn Joy'). Occasionally garden plants may escape and naturalise as has happened in parts of North America.

== Taxonomy ==
The plant was known to botanists, including Dioscorides (Διοσκουρίδης, 40 AD – 90 AD) in his De Materia Medica (Ancient Greek: Περὶ ὕλης ἰατρικῆς) as Telephion (Ancient Greek: Τηλεφιον). Pliny, Gerard and Parkinson were among many later authors to describe Telephium. It was first formally described by Linnaeus in 1753, as one of 15 species of Sedum, Gray included it and related species as a section of the genus Sedum. These species differ markedly from the rest of that genus by a distinct ovary and ovules, flowering stems, leaves, inflorescence, flower parts, colour and blooming time and chromosome number. Consequently, Ohba (1977) segregated these species into a separate genus, Hylotelephium with 28 species, specifying Hylotelephium telephium as the type species. Subsequent molecular phylogenetic studies have confirmed that these species constitute a distinct clade, separate from the very large Sedum genus, which is paraphyletic. Sedum is widely considered to be an unnatural catch-all taxonomic grouping. That clade, originally given the informal name Telephium and later Hylotelephium, was given the taxonomic rank of tribe Telephieae. The name Hylotelephium telephium has been widely, but not universally adopted.

=== Etymology and names ===
==== Telephium ====
The name Telephium was thought to be named after a surgical term for an ulcer that was particularly difficult to cure. This in turn was named after King Telephus who suffered from a spear wound that would not heal (see Uses).

==== Common names ====
Hylotelephium telephium has earned many common names in English, including orpine, livelong, life-everlasting, live-forever, (Note: "liveforever": Named for its hardiness, being able to live after being uprooted or cut) frog's-stomach, harping Johnny, midsummer-men, orphan John and witch's moneybags. (Note: Witch's moneybags: It is said that children would use the outer leaves to make witch's moneybags)

=== Subdivision ===
There are several subspecies. Ohba accepted the following:

- Hylotelphium telephium subsp. fabaria Koch – West & Central Europe
- Hylotelphium telephium subsp. maximum L. – Europe & W Asia
- Hylotelphium telephium subsp. ruprechtii Jalas – North-east Europe
- Hylotelphium telephium subsp. telephium – Central & East Europe, E Asia

== Distribution and habitat ==
The species is endemic from Europe to Asia, but has been widely introduced elsewhere, particularly N America. It can be found growing in fields, around hedges, hills, and on gravelly or calcareous soils. In the UK, it is found in woodland and near hedges.

== Uses ==
The very young leaves can be eaten raw, and both the young leaves and firm tubers can be cooked.

The plant has been used medicinally, being used by the Romans to treat wounds, and in later times to treat internal ulcers. It has also been used for love-divination, as the stems and leaves can store water, when picked, hence common name livelong. They were hung in a room where a girl was to be married to a boy. If the stems grew together, this 'sign' would mean that the marriage would be blessed and she would be happy. Alternatively, if they grew apart, the marriage prospects looked bad, and if a stem died, this would portent death.

== Gallery ==
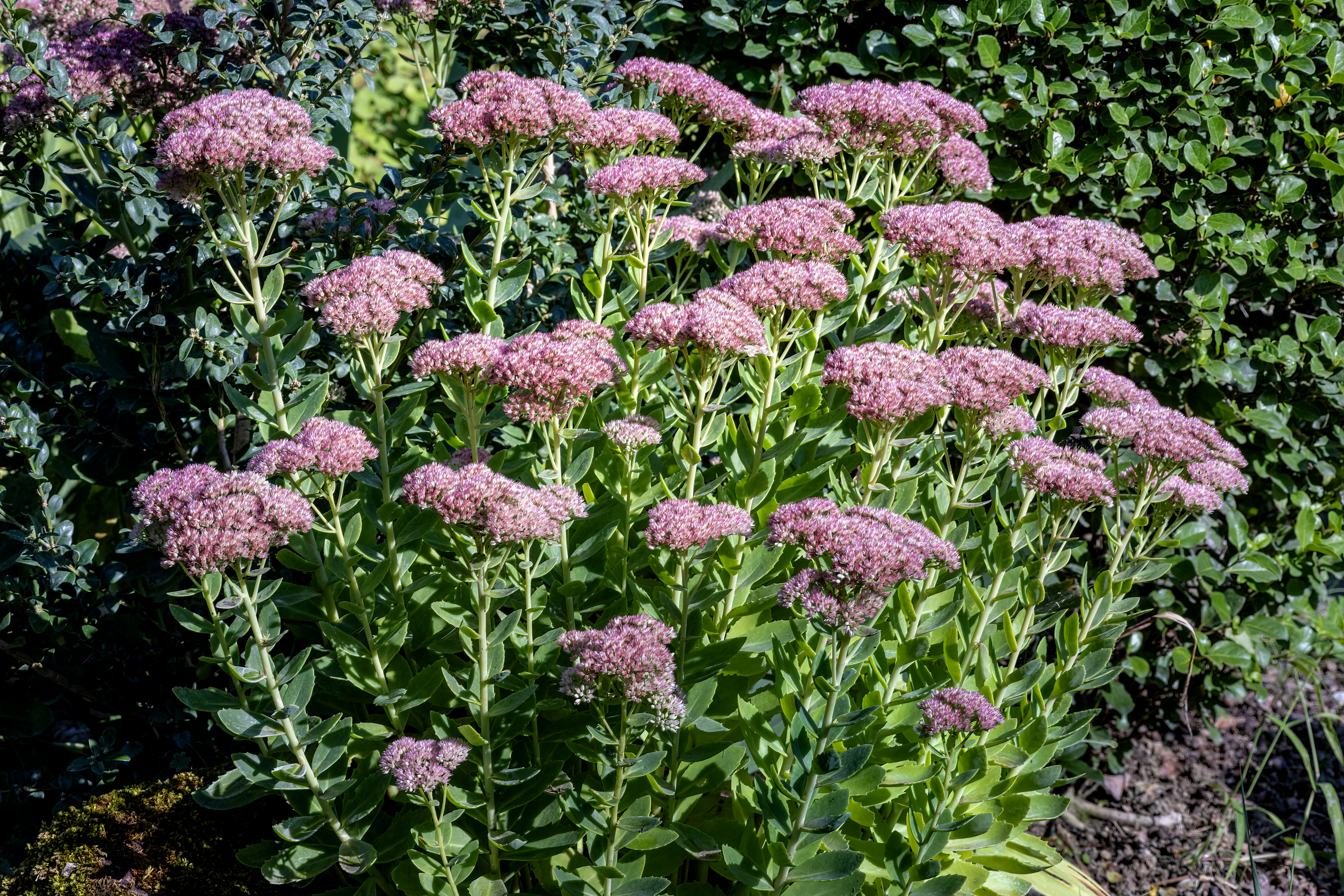
Hylotelephium telephium Subspecies telephium – Habit

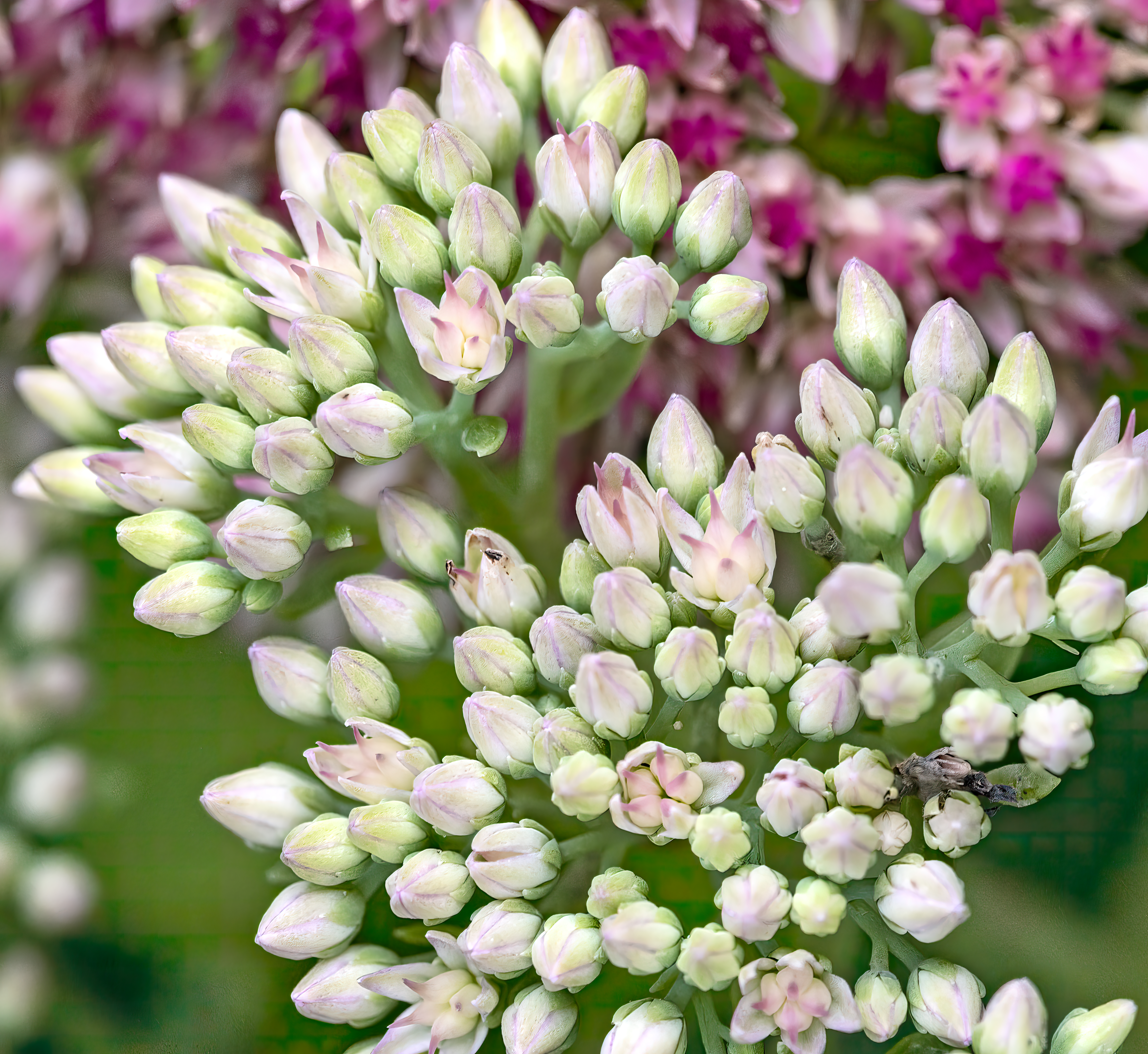
Hylotelephium telephium Subspecies telephium – Flower buds

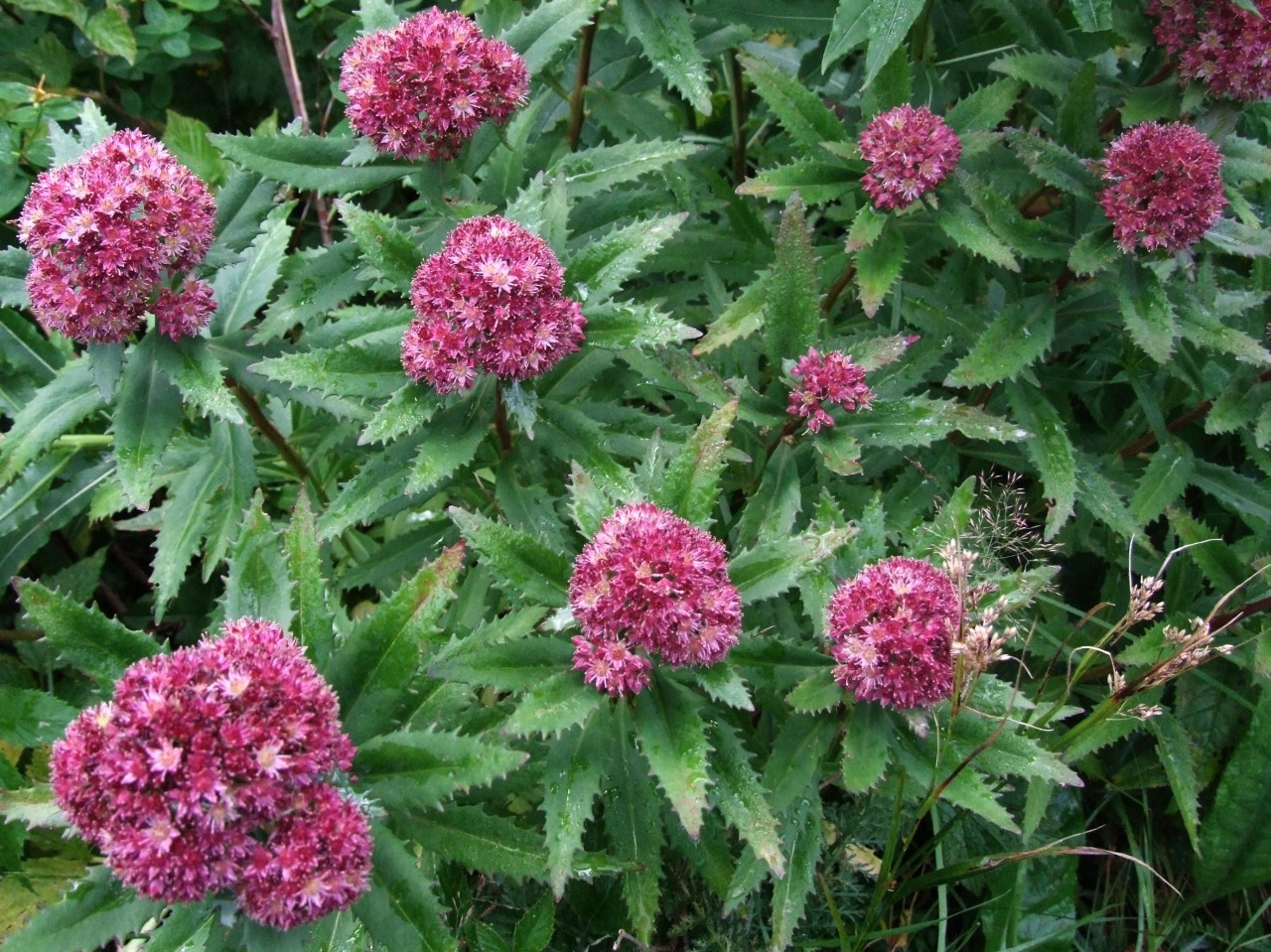
Subspecies fabaria

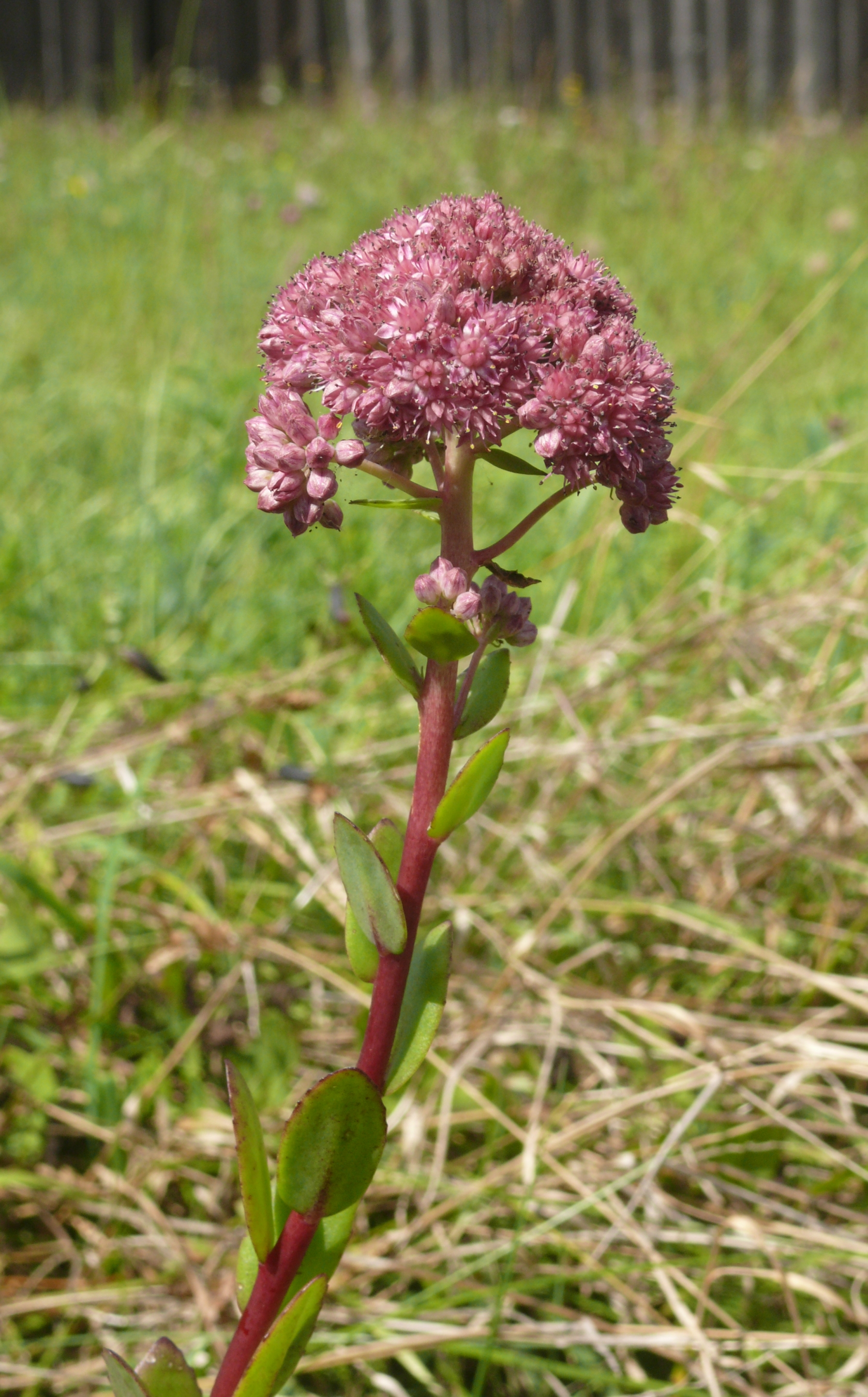
Subspecies telephium

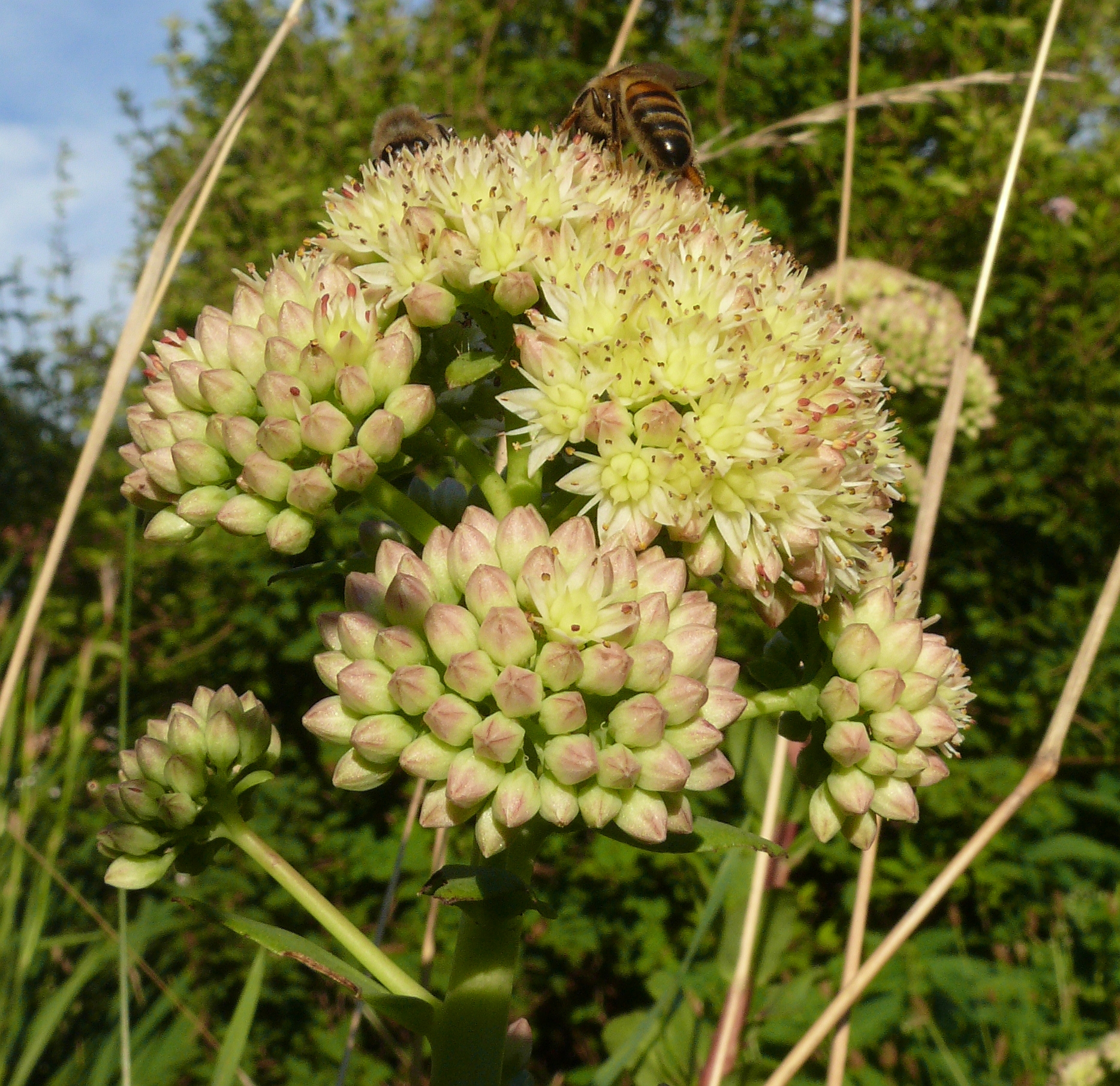
Subspecies maximum

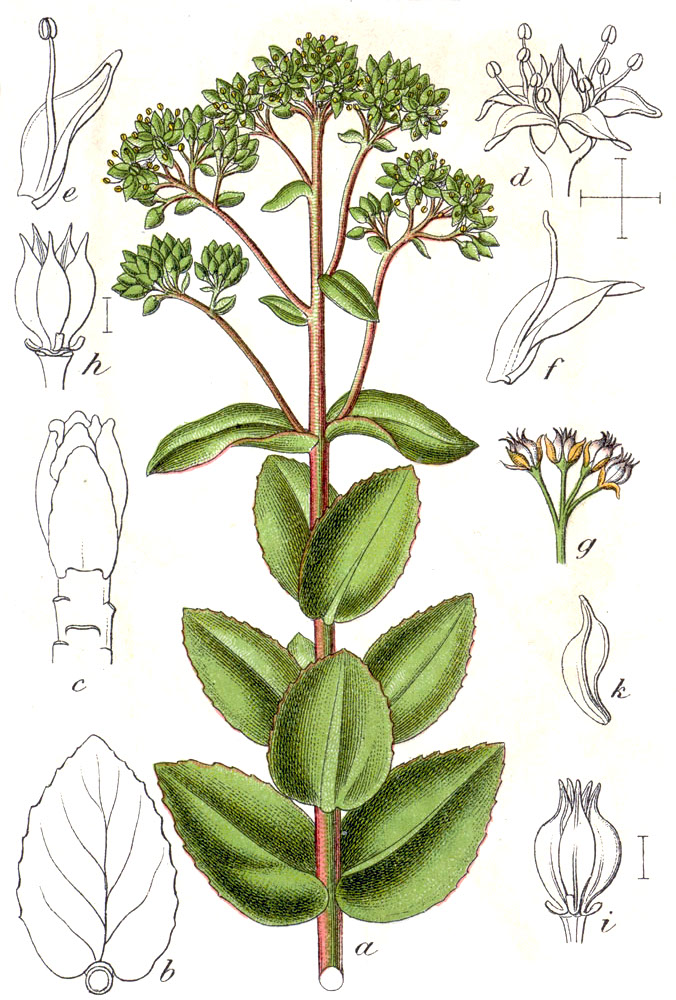
Subspecies maximum

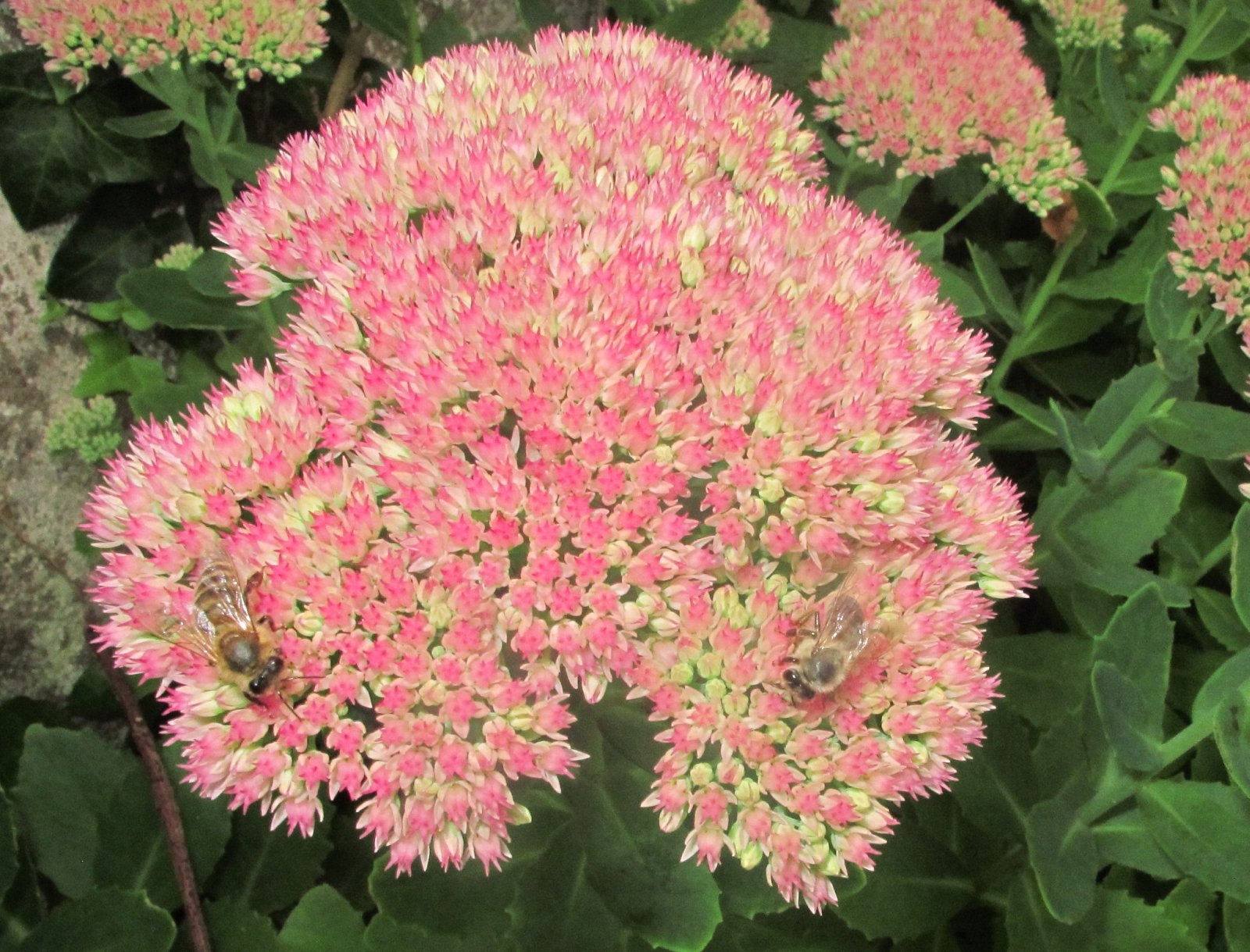
The cultivar 'Herbstfreude'

== Bibliography ==
=== Books ===
- Davison, Michael Worth; Martin, Neal V, eds. (1981). Reader's Digest Field Guide to the Wild Flowers of Britain. Reader's Digest. ISBN 978-0-276-00217-5.
- Elias, Thomas S.; Dykeman, Peter A. (2009) [1982]. Edible Wild Plants: A North American Field Guide to Over 200 Natural Foods. New York: Sterling. ISBN 978-1-4027-6715-9. OCLC 244766414.
- Hart, H. 't; Eggli, U., eds. (1995). Evolution and systematics of the Crassulaceae (23rd Congress of the International Organization for Succulent Plant Study, Wageningen, Netherlands, August 20th, 1994). Leiden: Backhuys. ISBN 978-9073348462. OCLC 34335028.
  - Ohba, Hideaki (1995). Systematic problems of Asian Sedoideae. pp. 151–158., in Hart & Eggli (1995)
- Thiede, J; Eggli, U (2007). "Crassulaceae". In Kubitzki, Klaus (ed.). Berberidopsidales, Buxales, Crossosomatales, Fabales p.p., Geraniales, Gunnerales, Myrtales p.p., Proteales, Saxifragales, Vitales, Zygophyllales, Clusiaceae Alliance, Passifloraceae Alliance, Dilleniaceae, Huaceae, Picramniaceae, Sabiaceae. pp. 83–119. ISBN 978-3540322146. (full text at ResearchGate)
- NAS (2001). Field guide to North American wildflowers: Eastern region (2nd ed.). Alfred A. Knopf. ISBN 978-0375402326.

Historical

- Bailey, Nathan (1736). "Telephium". Dictionarium Britannicum Or a More Compleat Universal Etymological English Dictionary Than Any Extant. London: T. Cox.
- Dioscorides, Pedanius (2000) [ca. 70]. "217: Telephion". In Osbaldeston, Tess Anne (ed.). De Materia Medica: Being an herbal with many other medicinal matters. Written in Greek in the first century of the common era. Vol. 2. Johannesburg: Ibidis. p. 360. ISBN 0-620-23435-0. (from the Latin, after John Goodyer 1655])
- Dioscorides (1549). "217 Telephiu". Libri octo graece et latine. Castigationes in eosdem libros (in Latin and Greek). Vol. 2. Paris: Arnold Birkmann. p. 135. (Index in frontispiece)
- Gray, Samuel Frederick (1821). "Sedum Telephium". A natural arrangement of British plants: according to their relations to each other as pointed out by Jussieu, De Candolle, Brown, &c. 2 vols. London: Baldwin, Cradock, and Joy. pp. ii: 539–540.
- Linnaeus, Carl (1753). "Sedum telephium". Species Plantarum: exhibentes plantas rite cognitas, ad genera relatas, cum differentiis specificis, nominibus trivialibus, synonymis selectis, locis natalibus, secundum systema sexuale digestas. Vol. 1. Stockholm: Impensis Laurentii Salvii. p. 430., see also Species Plantarum
- Maund, Benjamin (1878). "Sedum telephium: common orpine stonecrop". The Botanic Garden; Consisting of Highly Finished Figures of Hardy Ornamental Flowering Plants, Cultivated in Great Britain; with Their Names, Orders, History, Qualities, Culture, and Physiological Observations. London: G. Bell and Sons. p. 133.
- Sowerby, James (1804). "Sedum telephium". English Botany; Or, Coloured Figures of British Plants, with Their Essential characters, synonyms, and places of growth. To which will be added, occasional remarks. Vol. 19. London: Robert Hardwicke. p. 1319., see also English Botany

=== Articles ===
- Mayuzumi, Shinzo; Ohba, Hideaki (2004). "The Phylogenetic Position of Eastern Asian Sedoideae (Crassulaceae) Inferred from Chloroplast and Nuclear DNA Sequences". Systematic Botany. 29 (3): 587–598. doi:10.1600/0363644041744329. ISSN 0363-6445. JSTOR 25063994. S2CID 84319808.
- Ohba, Hideaki (March 1977). "The taxonomic status of Sedum telephium and its allied species (Crassulaceae)". The Botanical Magazine Tokyo. 90 (1): 41–56. doi:10.1007/BF02489468. S2CID 22239507.
- Ohba, H (1978). "Generic and infrageneric classification of the old world sedoideae crassulaceae". Journal of the Faculty of Science University of Tokyo Section III Botany. 12 (4): 139–193.

=== Websites ===
- TPL (2013). "The Plant List Version 1.1: Sedum telephium". Royal Botanic Gardens, Kew and Missouri Botanical Garden.
- BSBI (March 2019). "Hylotelphium telephium" (PDF). The complete list of taxon names. Botanical Society of Britain & Ireland.
- FNA (2008). "Hylotelphium telephium". Flora of North America vol. 8. New York: Oxford University Press. pp. 162–163.
- Lehmuskallio, Eija (2019). "Orpine, Hylotelephium telephium". NatureGate: Flowers. University of Helsinki.
- "Live-forever, Hylotelephium telephium (L.) [Sedum telephium]". Friends of the Wild Flower Garden. Eloise Butler Wildflower Garden. 2015.
- MISIN. "Witch's moneybags (Hylotelephium telephium)". Midwest Invasive Species Information Network. Michigan State University.
- "Live-long: Sedum telephium". Elma Skin Care.
