= Hideaki Ohba =

Japanese botanist (born 1943)

- 大場秀章
- Born: July 14, 1943 (age 83)
- Citizenship: Japan
- Education: Tokyo University of Agriculture
- Employer(s): Tohoku University; University of Tokyo
- Known for: Plant taxonomy, botanical cultural history

Hideaki Ohba (or Ōba) (Japanese: 大場秀章) (born 1943) is a Japanese botanist, pteridologist, and taxonomist. He is a professor emeritus at the University of Tokyo.

== Publications ==
=== Books ===
- Flora of Japan. Several volumes. Kodansha, Ltd. Tokyo
- Ōba, Hideaki; Malla, Samal B. (1988). The Himalayan plants. Tokyo: University of Tokyo Press. ISBN 4-13-068141-9. OCLC 18542612. The Himalayan Plants, vv. 1-2-3 n.º 31 de Bull. (Tōkyō Daigaku. Sōgō Kenkyū Shiryōkan). 174 pp.

== Honours ==
- 2006: professor emeritus of the University of Tokyo
