= Valley of Flowers National Park =

Park in Uttarakhand, India

UNESCO World Heritage Site
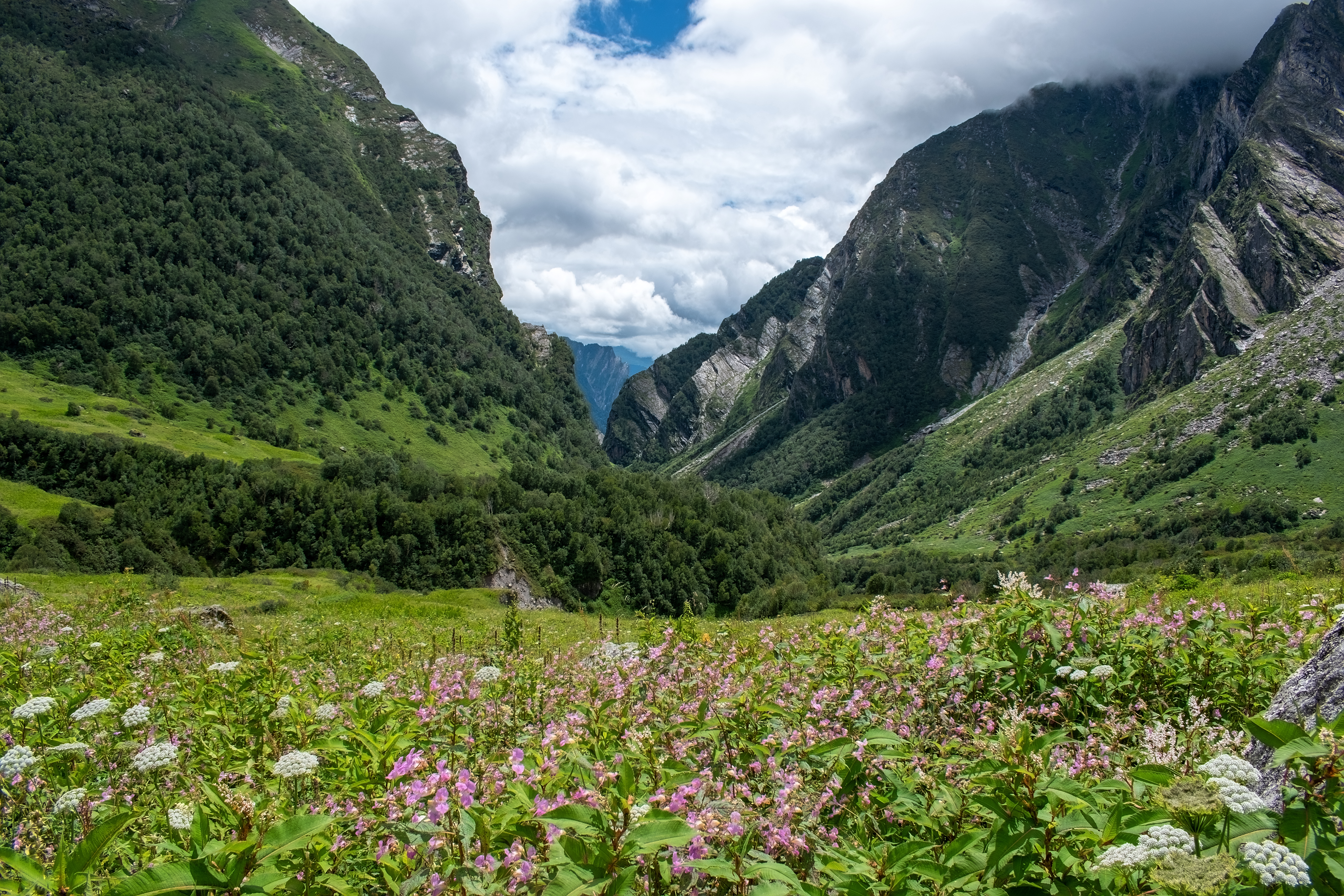
- View of the Valley of Flowers

- Location within Uttarakhand Location within India Location within Earth
- Location: Chamoli District, Uttarakhand, India
- Part of: Nanda Devi and Valley of Flowers National Parks
- Criteria: Natural: (vii), (x)
- Reference: 335-002
- Inscription: 1988 (12th Session)
- Extensions: 2005
- Area: 8,750 ha (33.8 sq mi)
- Coordinates: 30°43′48″N 79°37′03″E

Valley of Flowers National Park is an Indian national park which was established in 1982. It is located in Chamoli in the state of Uttarakhand and is known for its meadows of endemic alpine flowers and the variety of flora. This richly diverse area is also home to rare and endangered animals, including the Asiatic black bear, snow leopard, musk deer, brown bear, red fox and blue sheep. Birds found in the park include Himalayan monal pheasant and other high-altitude birds.

At 3,352 to 3,658 meters above sea level, the gentle landscape of the Valley of Flowers National Park complements the rugged mountain wilderness of Nanda Devi National Park to the east. Together, they encompass a unique transition zone between the mountain ranges of the Zanskar and Great Himalayas. The park stretches over 87.50 km^{2} and is about 8 km long and 2 km wide. It lies completely in the temperate alpine zone. Both parks are encompassed in the Nanda Devi Biosphere Reserve (223,674 ha) which is further surrounded by a buffer zone (5,148.57 km^{2}). Nanda Devi National Park Reserve is in the UNESCO World Network of Biosphere Reserves.

The park is open only during summer from June to October and is covered by heavy snow for the rest of the year.

== History ==
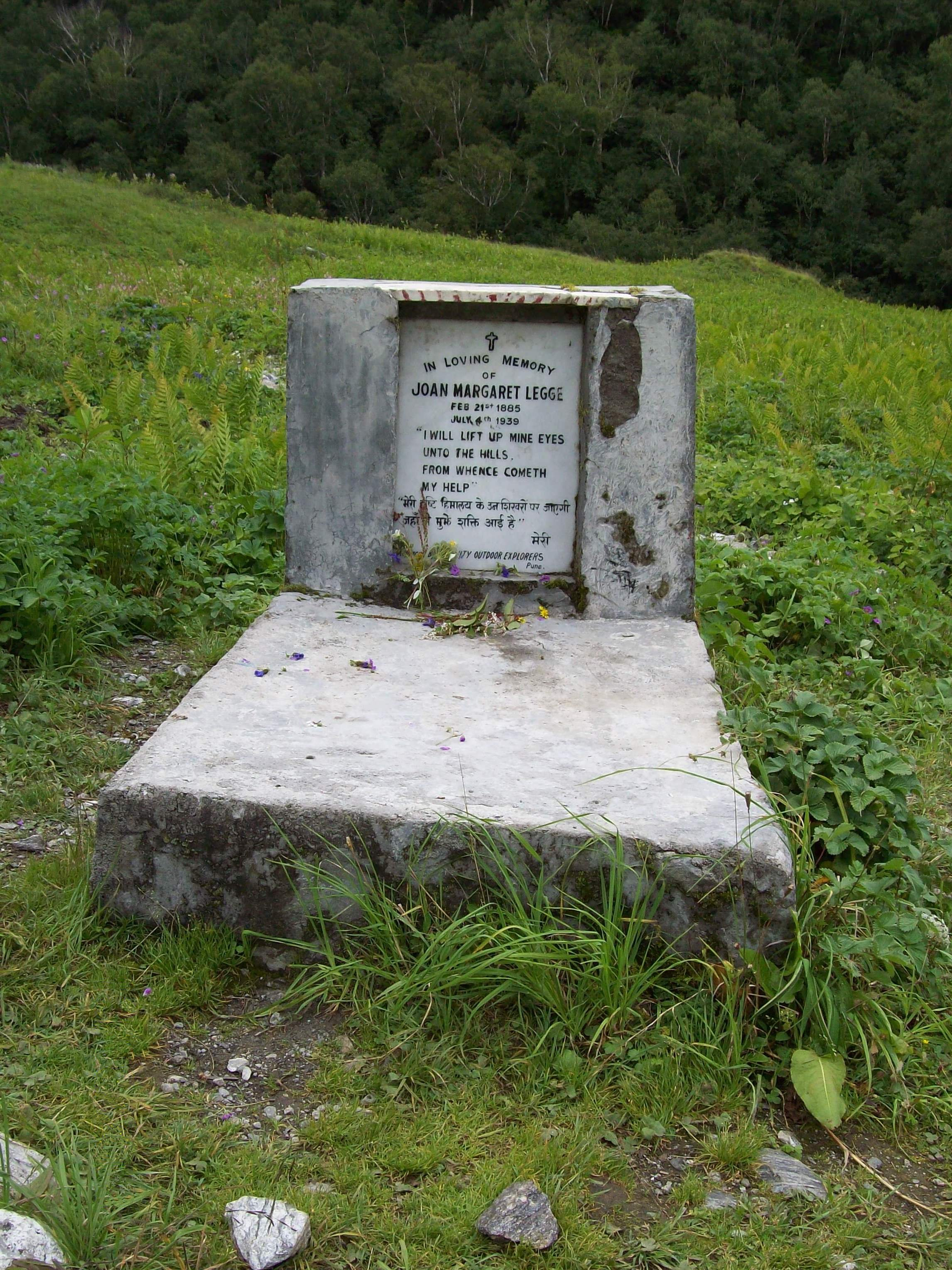
Lady Joan Margaret Legge's memorial grave.

=== Documented explorers ===
The place was little known to the outside world due to its inaccessibility. In 1931, Frank S. Smythe, Eric Shipton and R. L. Holdsworth, all British mountaineers, lost their way while returning from a successful expedition to Mt. Kamet and happened upon the valley, which was full of flowers. They were attracted to the beauty of the area and named it the "Valley of Flowers." Smythe later authored a book of the same name.

In 1939, Lady Joan Margaret Legge, (21 February 1885 – 4 July 1939) a botanist deputed by the Royal Botanic Gardens, Kew, arrived at the valley to study flowers and while traversing some rocky slopes to collect flowers, she slipped and died. Her sister later visited the valley and erected a memorial near the spot.

Prof. Chandra Prakash Kala, a botanist deputed by the Wildlife Institute of India, carried out a research study on the floristics and conservation of the valley for a decade, beginning in 1993. He made an inventory of 520 alpine plants exclusively growing in this national park and authored two books – "The Valley of Flowers – Myth and Reality" and "Ecology and Conservation of the Valley of Flowers National Park, Garhwal Himalaya".

=== Timeline ===
1862: The Pushpawati River Valley was discovered by Col. Edmund Smyth;

1931: The valley visited by the climber Frank S. Smythe who wrote a book publicizing the "Valley of Flowers";

1934: The upper Nanda Devi Sanctuary was reached and described by mountaineers Eric Shipton & Bill Tilman;

1936: Mountaineers Bill Tilman & Noel Odell climbed Nanda Devi;

1939: The basin established as the Nanda Devi Game Sanctuary by Government Order 1493/XIV- 28 of 7/01;

1962: Border disputes closed the area to traffic, altering the local economy;

1974–82: The sanctuary was opened to mountaineering, but the ensuing degradation led to its closure to all users;

1980: The park was established as Sanjay Gandhi National Park by Notification 3912/ XIV 3-35-80; grazing and mountaineering stopped;

1980: The Valley of Flowers was declared a national park by Government Order 4278/XIV-3-66-80 under the provisions of the Wildlife Protection Act of 1972, for the conservation of its flora;

1982: The park was renamed Nanda Devi National Park;

1988: The Nanda Devi National Biosphere Reserve established (223,674 ha) with the national park as core zone (62,462 ha) and a 514,857 ha buffer area surrounding both sites; restrictions were imposed on the rights of nearby villagers. Inscribed as a UNESCO World Heritage site;

2000: The Biosphere Reserve extended by the government to 586,069 ha and the Valley of Flowers National Park was added as the second core zone (62,462 ha+ 8,750 ha, totalling core areas of 71,212 ha);

2004: The two core zones and buffer zone designated a UNESCO MAB reserve.

== Location ==
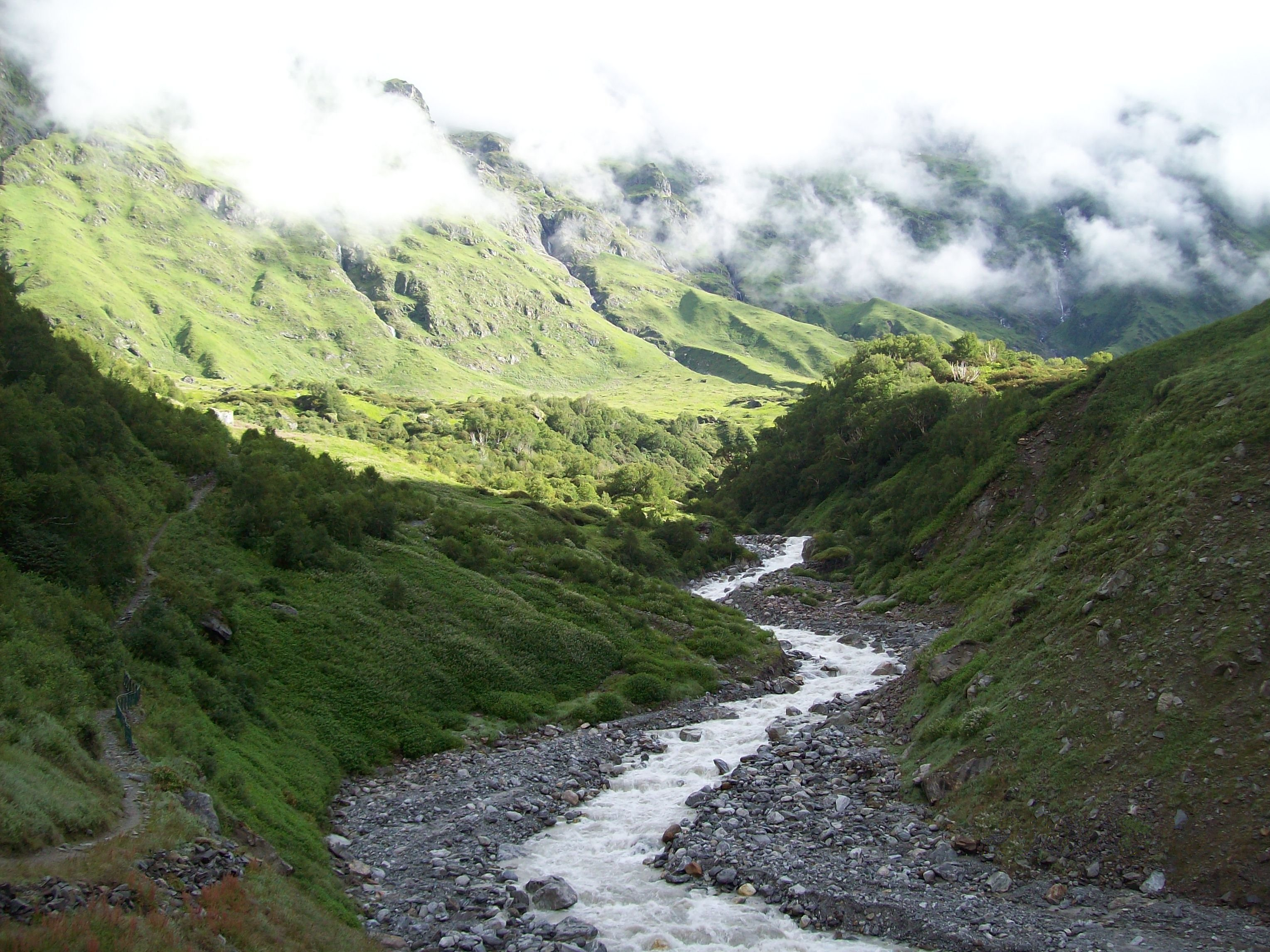
Trail visible on the left

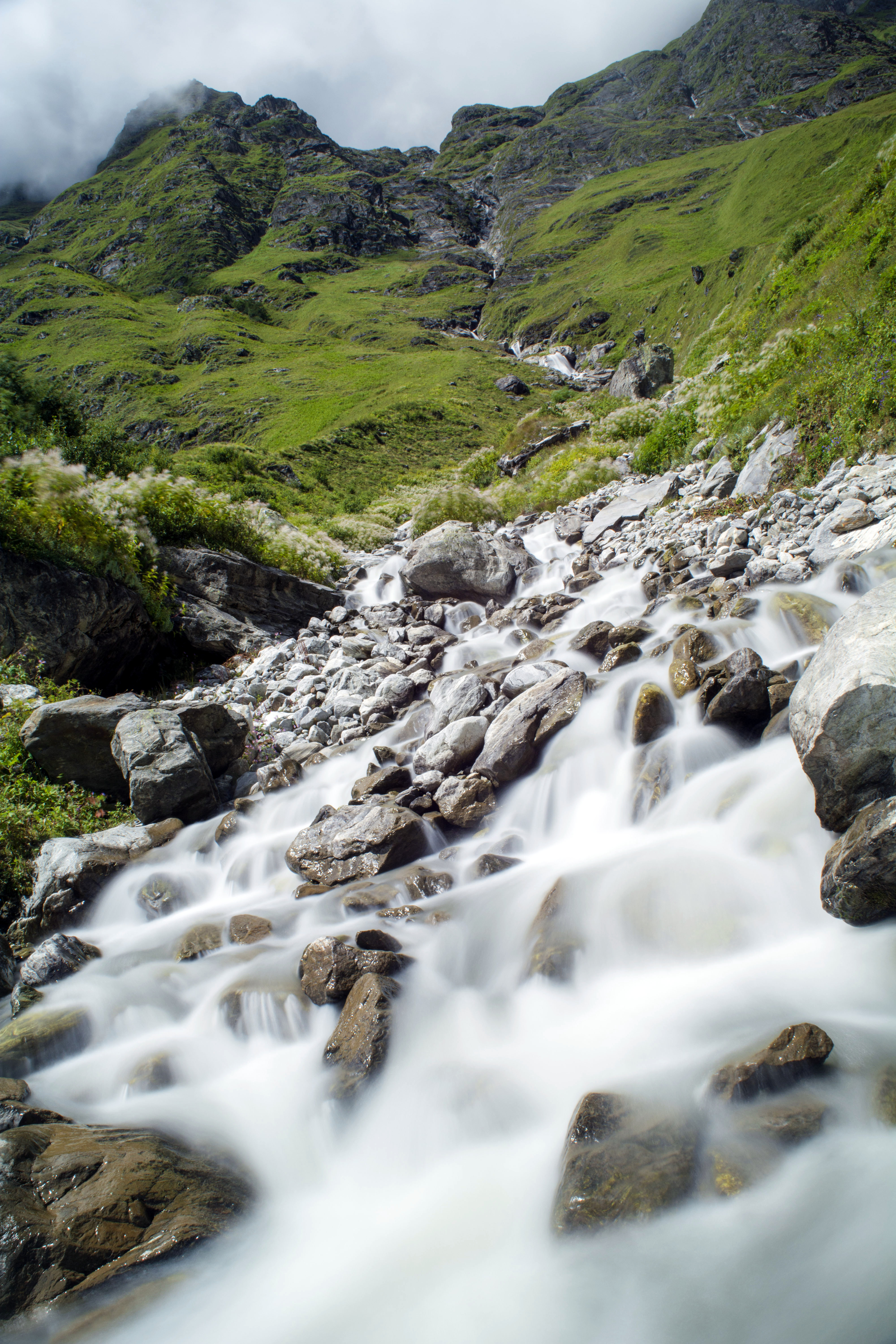
One of the streams that cut the trail

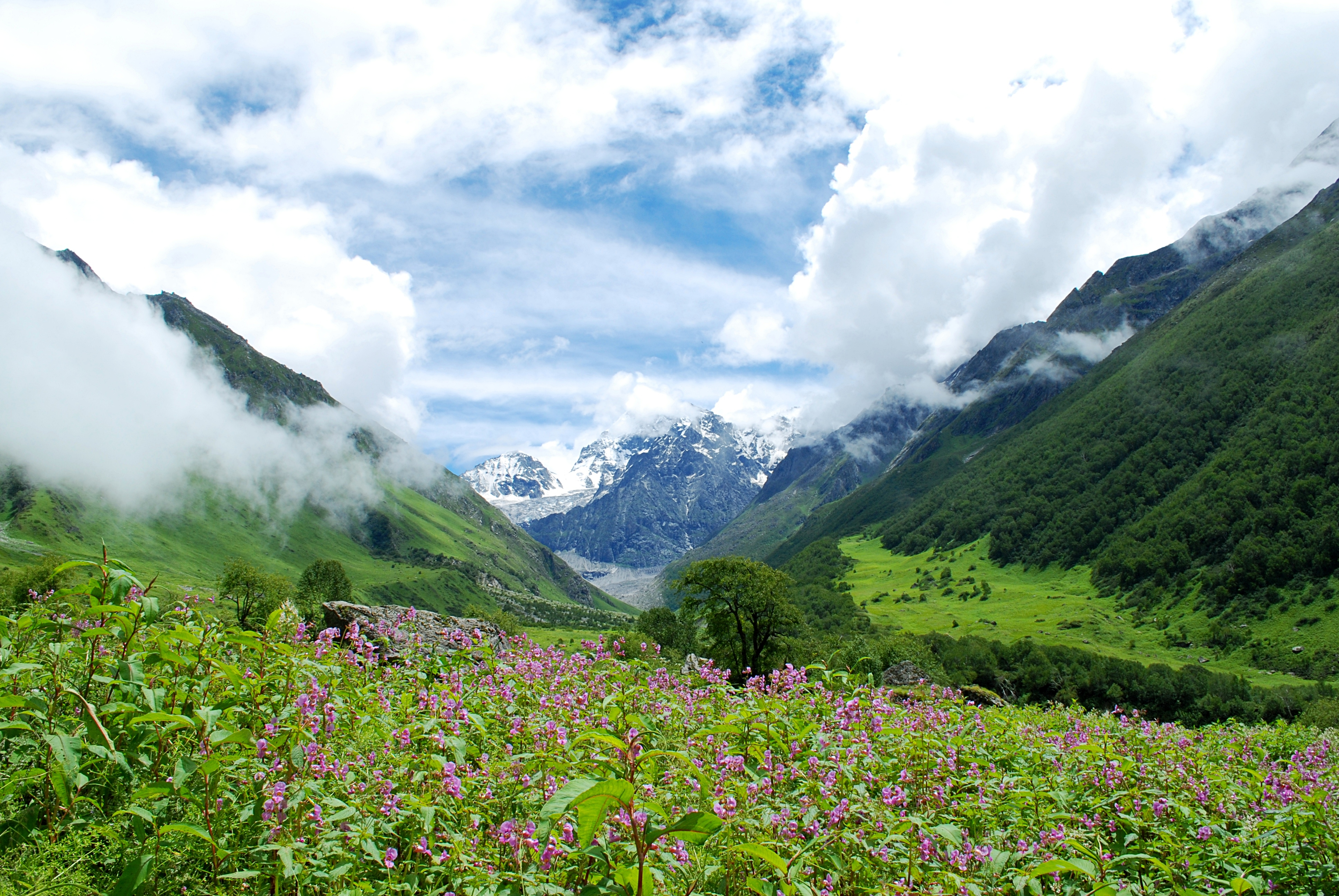
Valley of flowers with the snow capped Himalayas in the background

Getting to the Valley of Flowers requires a trek of about 17 km (10.5 mi). The nearest major town is Joshimath in Garhwal, which has convenient road connections from Haridwar and Dehradun, both about 270 km (168 mi) south of Joshimath. From Delhi, one can take the train to Haridwar and then travel by bus to Govindghat via Rishikesh. Govindghat is approximately 24 km before another important destination of Badrinath. It is also possible to drive from Delhi to Govindghat, a distance of about 500 km.

Govindghat is a small place close to Joshimath (around one hour driving distance), where the trek begins. From Govindghat, shared taxis up to 4 km and then a trek of less than 11 km (8.6 mi) brings trekkers to Ghangaria, a small settlement located about 3 km (about 2 mi) from the valley. One can also hire a porter, mule or helicopter to reach Ghangaria. The trek from Govindghat to Ghangaria is common to the Gurudwara Shri Hemkund Sahib Sikh Temple at Hemkund and a trekker is likely to find many Sikh pilgrims on the route. As one nears Ghangaria, one is greeted by fields of perfumed wild flowers, wild rose bushes and wild strawberries by the sides of the path. Visitors to the Valley of Flowers need to get a permit from the Forest Department, at Ghangaria. The permit is valid for three days. Only visiting and trekking are allowed during the day time.

Visitors are not allowed to stay inside the National park and accommodation can be obtained at Ghangaria. The best time to visit is between July and early September, when the valley is full of flowers, just after the outbreak of monsoon.

=== Geography ===
The Valley of Flowers is nestled in the Pushpawati river valley which is in the upper expanses of Bhyundar Ganga river near Joshimath in Garhwal region. The lower reaches of Bhyundar Ganga near Gobindghat are known as Bhyundar Valley. The Valley of Flowers, which lies between 30° 41' to 30° 48'N and 79° 33' to 79° 46'E, in the Pushpawati valley is 20 km northwest of Nanda Devi National Park across the wide valley of the Bhyundar Ganga. It is one of two hanging valleys lying at the head of the Bhyundar valley, the other being the shorter Hemkund valley which runs parallel to Valley of Flowers some 10 km south. Valley of Flowers runs east–west approximately 15 km in length with average width of 6 km. A small tributary of Pushpawati river originates from Tipra glacier from Gauri Parbat in the east and flows through the Valley of Flowers.

The area lies on the Zanskar range of the Himalayas with the highest point in the national park being Gauri parbat at 6,719 m above sea level.

=== Climate ===
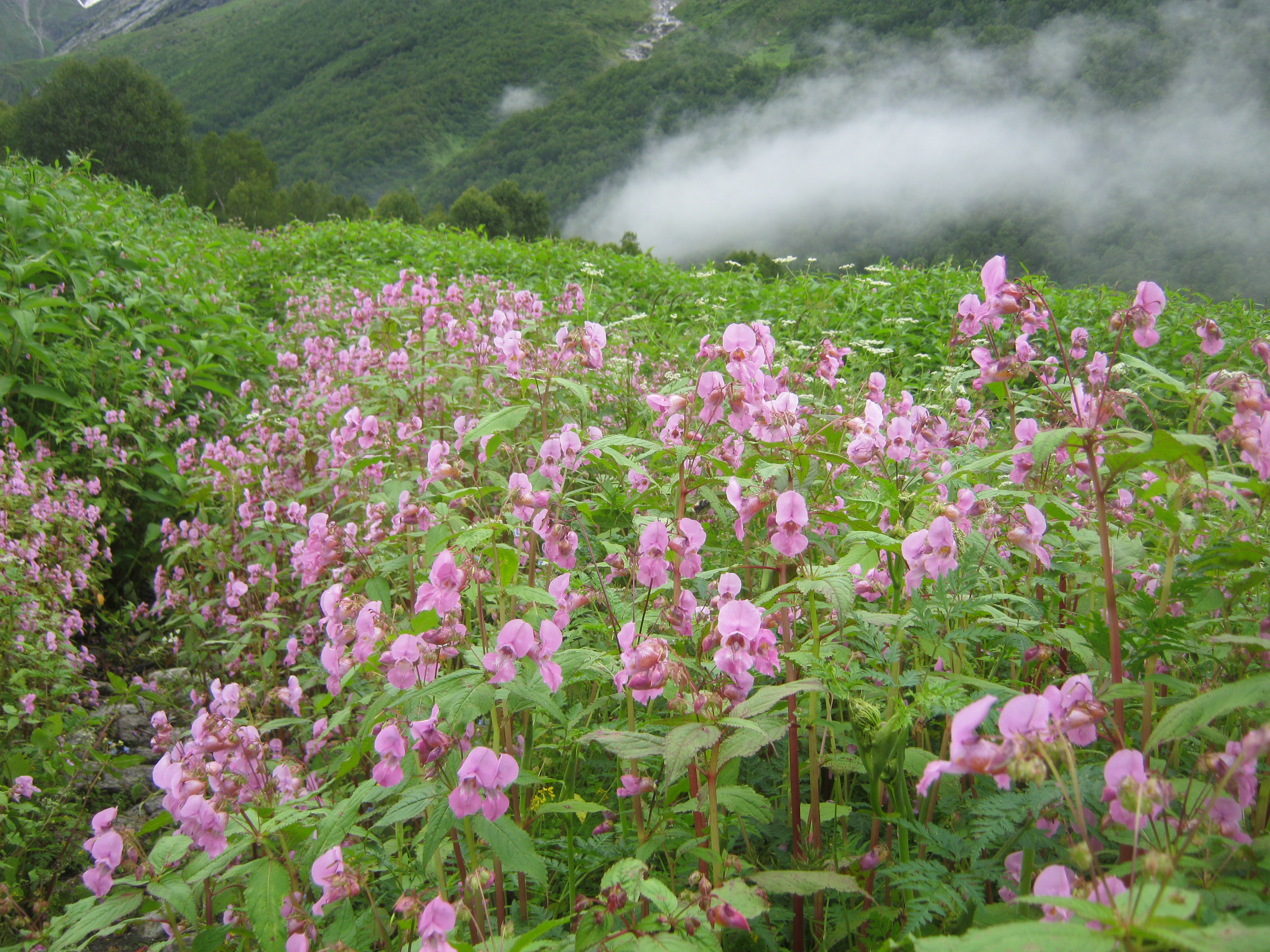
A scene from Valley of Flowers, Impatiens sulcata, This flower paints the Valley of Flowers in pink in the first week of August.

Being an inner Himalayan valley, the Nanda Devi Basin has a distinctive micro-climate. Conditions are generally dry with low annual precipitation, but there is heavy monsoon rainfall from late June to early September. Prevailing mist and low cloud during the monsoon keeps the soil moist, hence the vegetation is lusher than is usual in the drier inner Himalayan valleys. From mid April to June temperatures are moderate to cool (19 °C maximum). The Valley of Flowers also has the micro-climate of an enclosed inner Himalayan valley, and is shielded from the full impact of the southwest summer monsoon by the Greater Himalaya range to its south. There is often dense fog and rain especially during the late summer monsoon. Both Basin and Valley are usually snow-bound for six to seven months between late October and late March, the snow accumulating deeper and at lower altitudes on the shadowed southern than on the northern side of the valleys.

== Ecology ==
=== Biodiversity ===
The Valley of Flowers is a high-altitude Himalayan valley that has long been acknowledged by renowned mountaineers, botanists, and in literature. It has been recognized internationally for over a century and is referenced in the Hindu religion. Local people have visited the valley since ancient times. Indian yogis are known to have visited the valley for meditation. The Valley of Flowers has many different colorful flowers, taking on various shades of colors as time progressed.

The Valley of Flowers has gained importance as a region containing a diversity of alpine flora, representative of the Western Himalayan alpine shrub and meadows ecoregion. The rich diversity of species reflects the valley's location within a transition zone between the Zanskar and Great Himalayas ranges to the north and south, respectively, and between the Eastern Himalaya and Western Himalaya flora. A number of plant species are considered threatened. Several have not been recorded outside of Uttarakhand. Two have not been recorded in Nanda Devi National Park. The diversity of threatened species of medicinal plants is higher than has been recorded in other Indian Himalayan protected areas. The entire Nanda Devi Biosphere Reserve lies within the Western Himalayas Endemic Bird Area (EBA). The Valley of Flowers National Park is the second core zone of the Nanda Devi Biosphere Reserve. Seven restricted-range bird species are endemic to this part of the EBA.

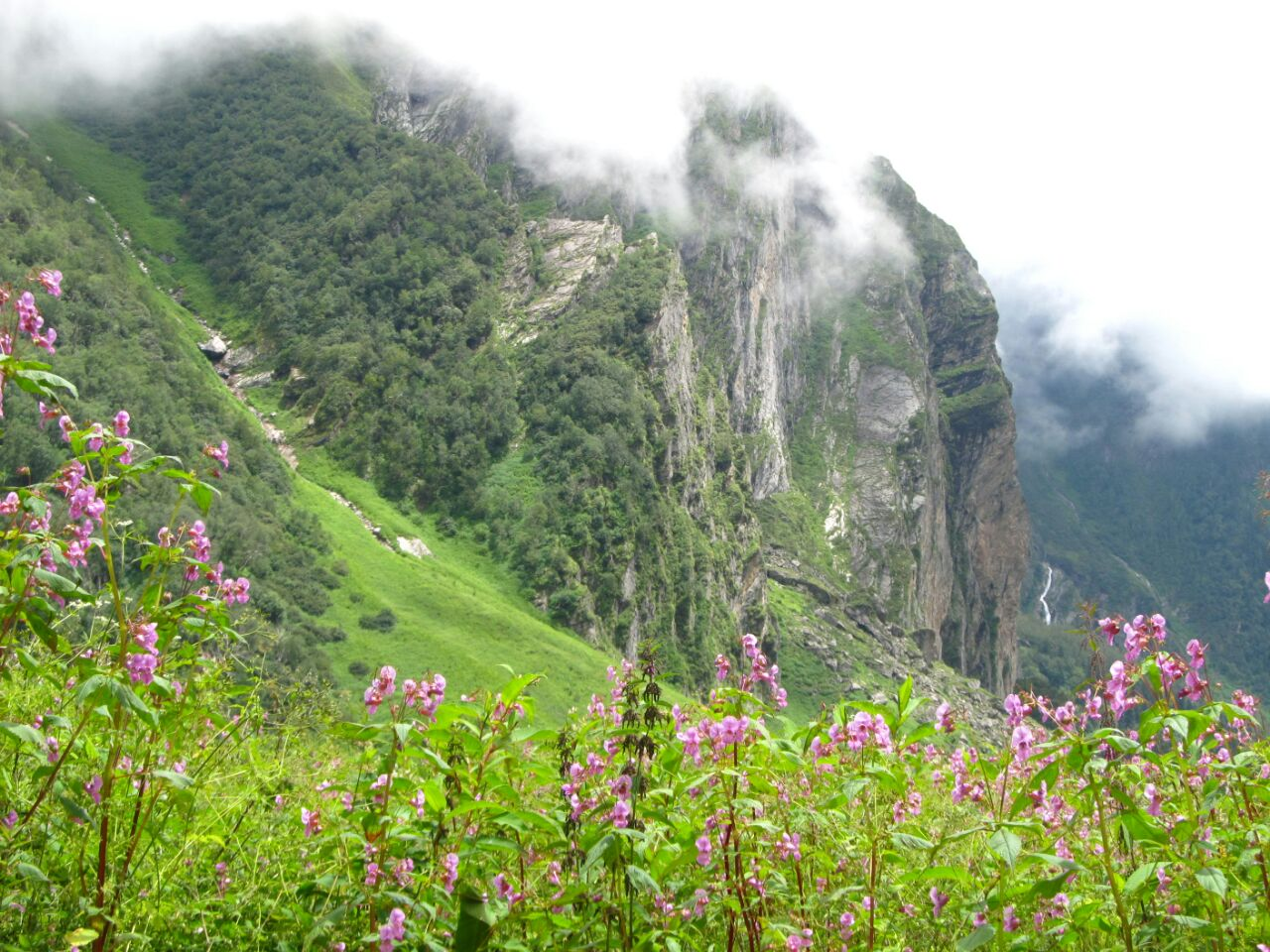
Flowers blossomed in the valley

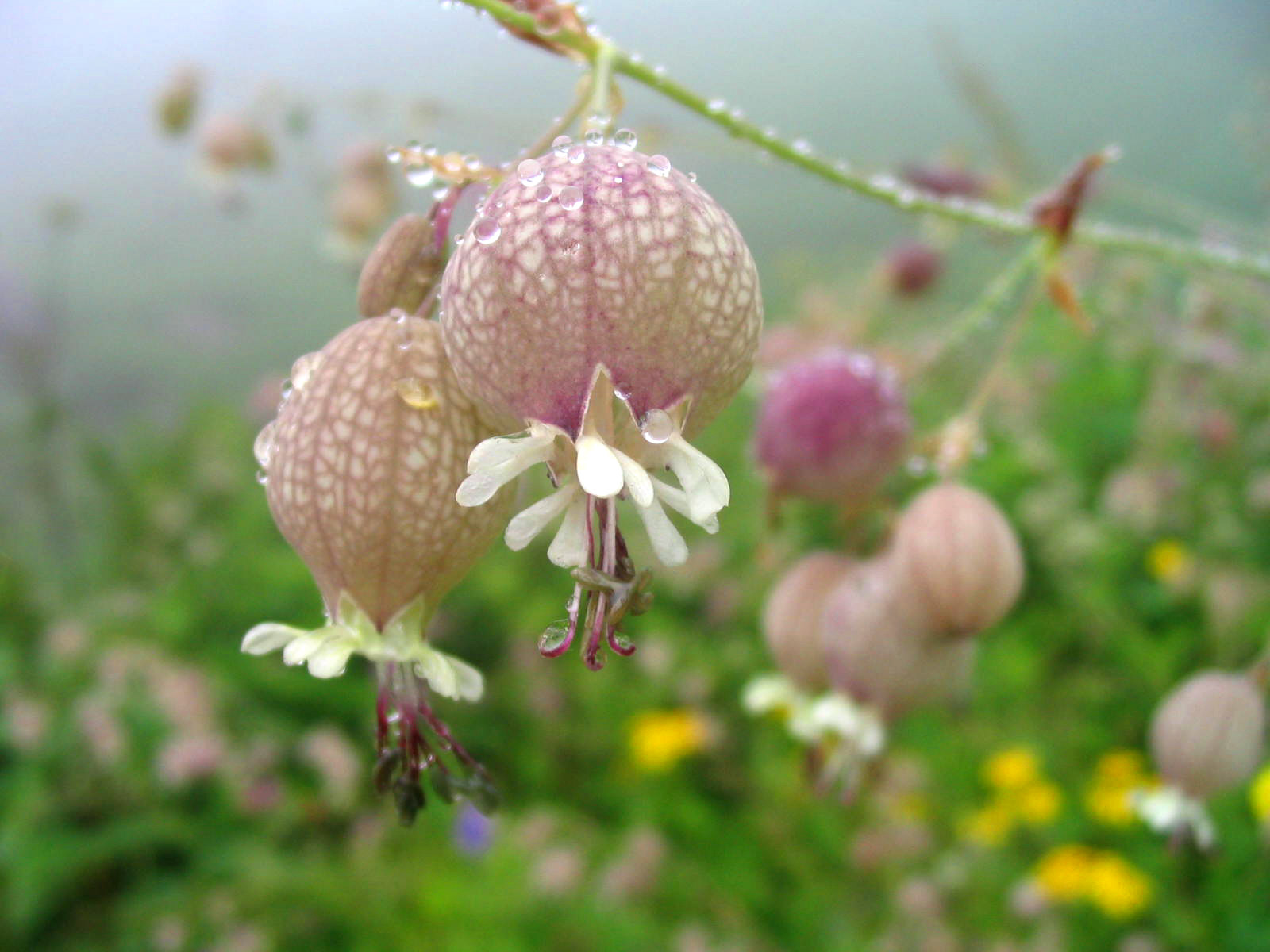
A Flower in Valley of Flowers (VoF)
.

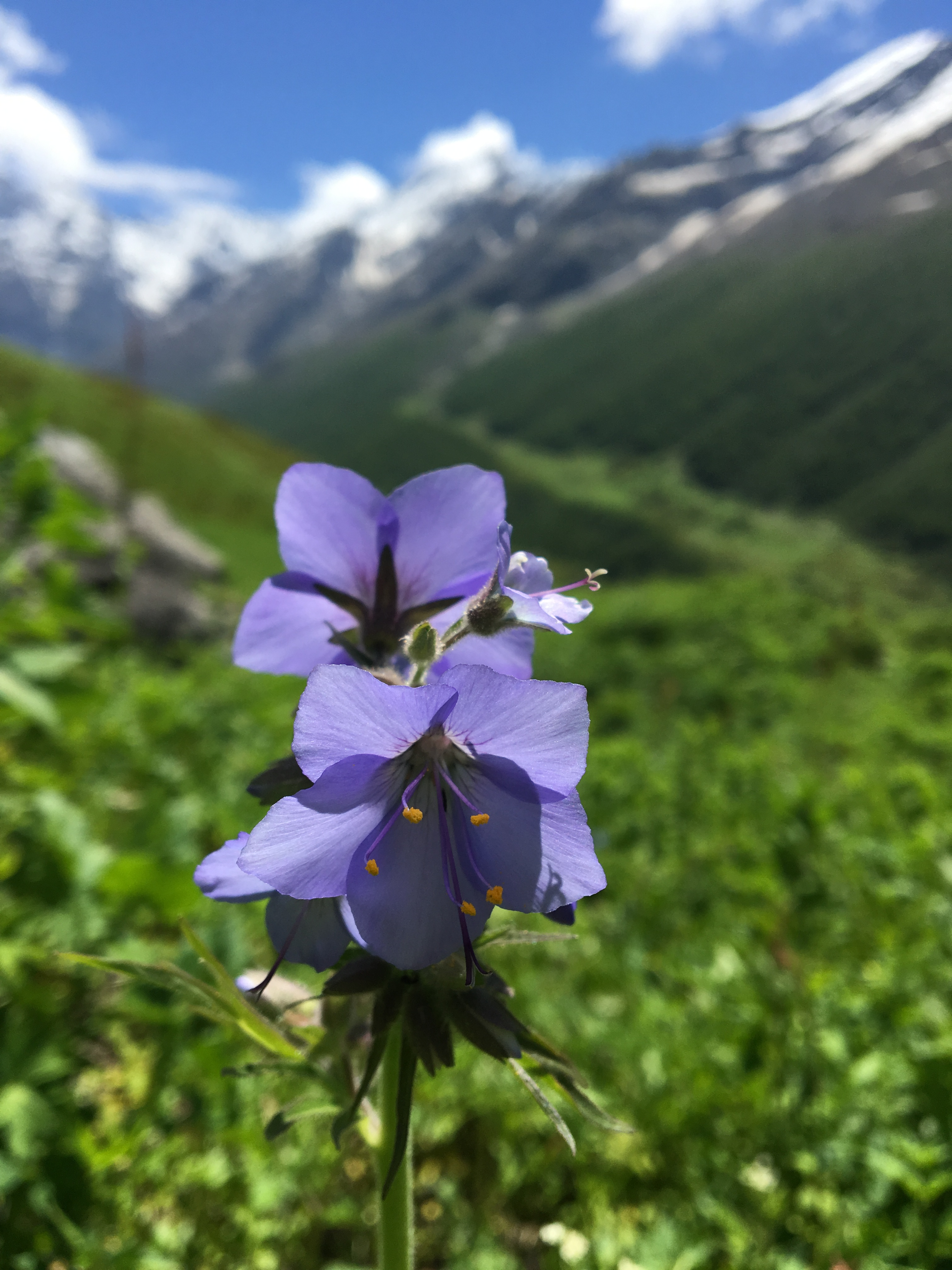
Another Flower in Valley of Flowers (VoF)

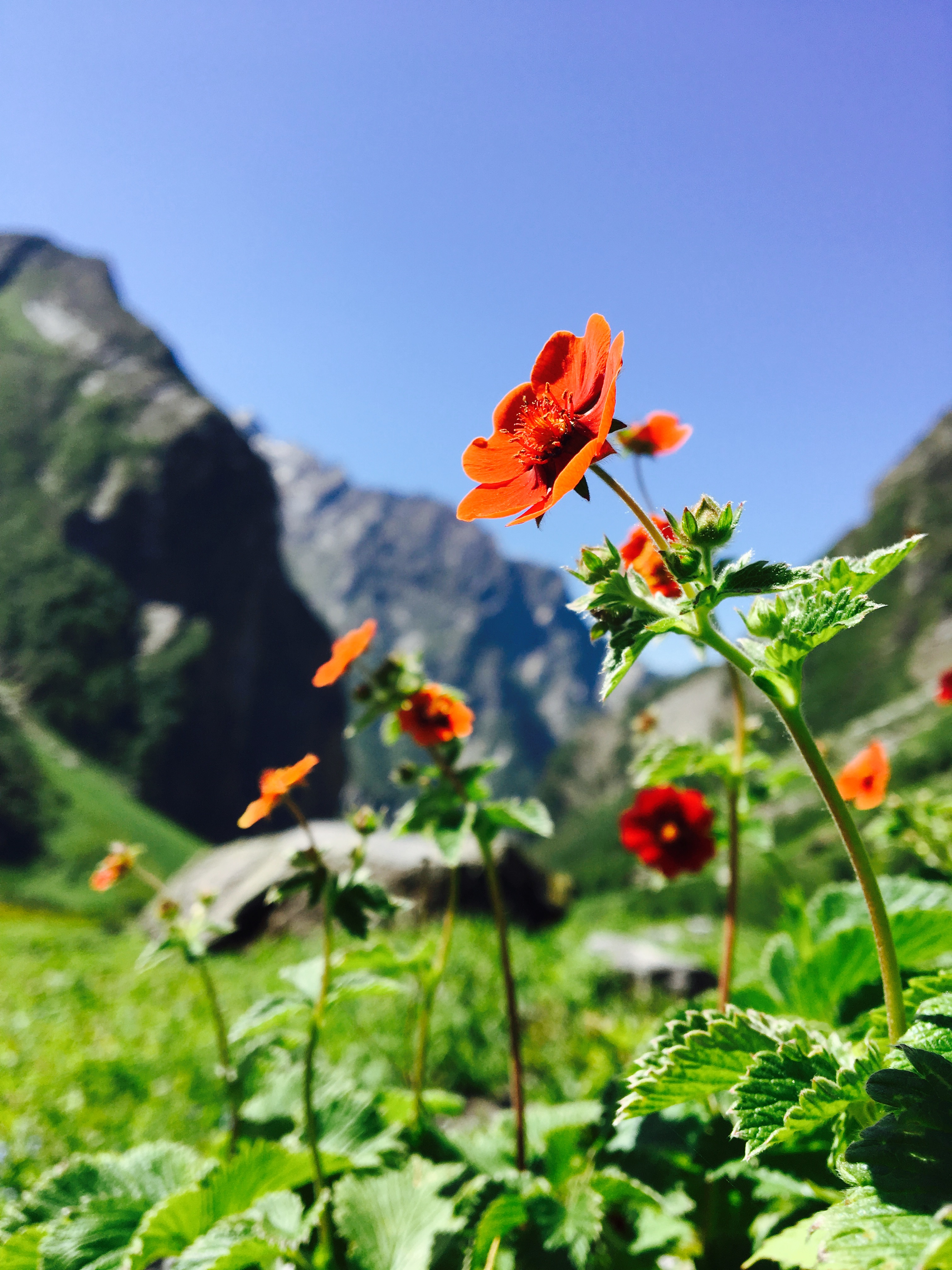
Flower snapshot in VoF

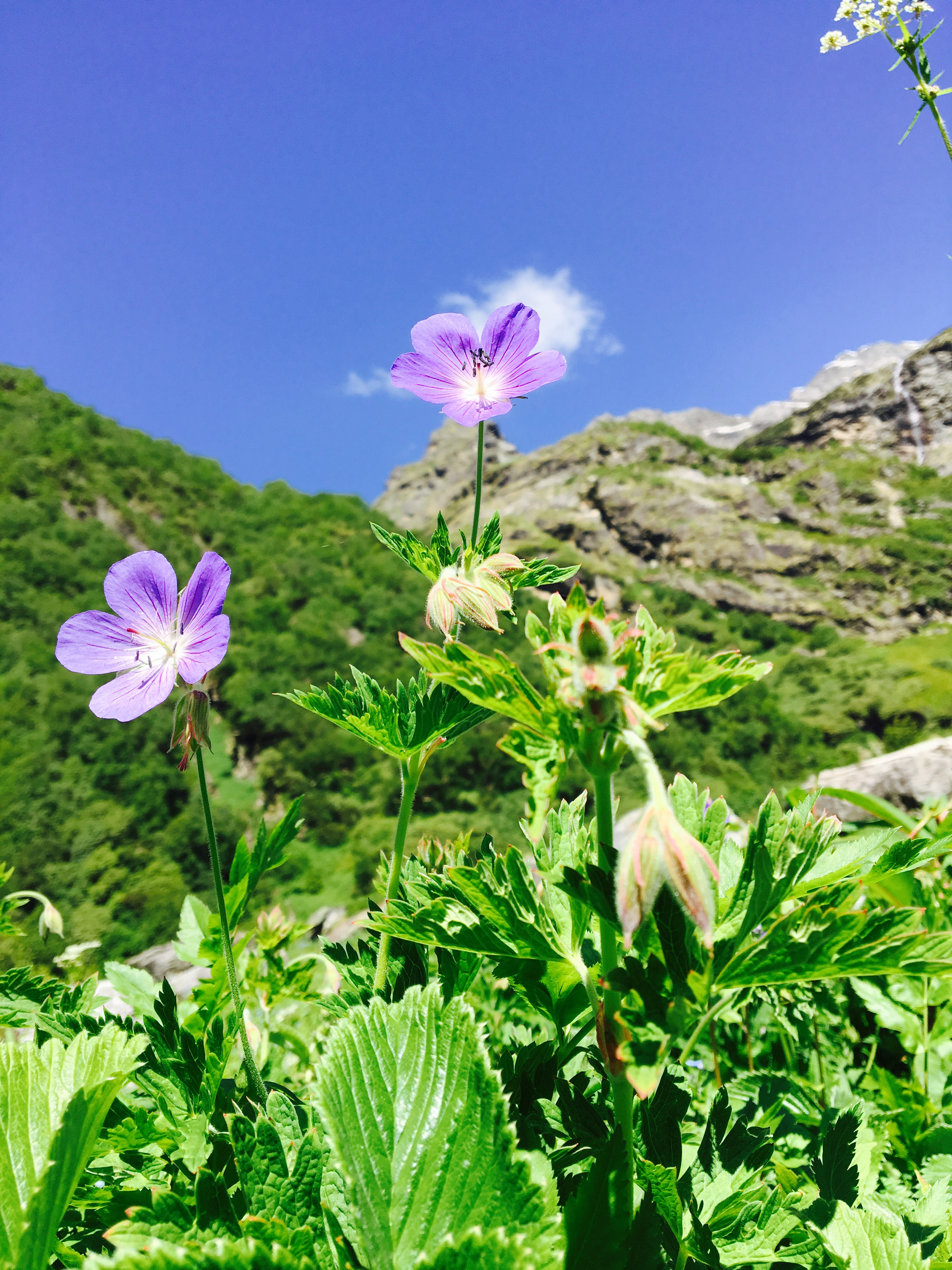
Flower blossoming

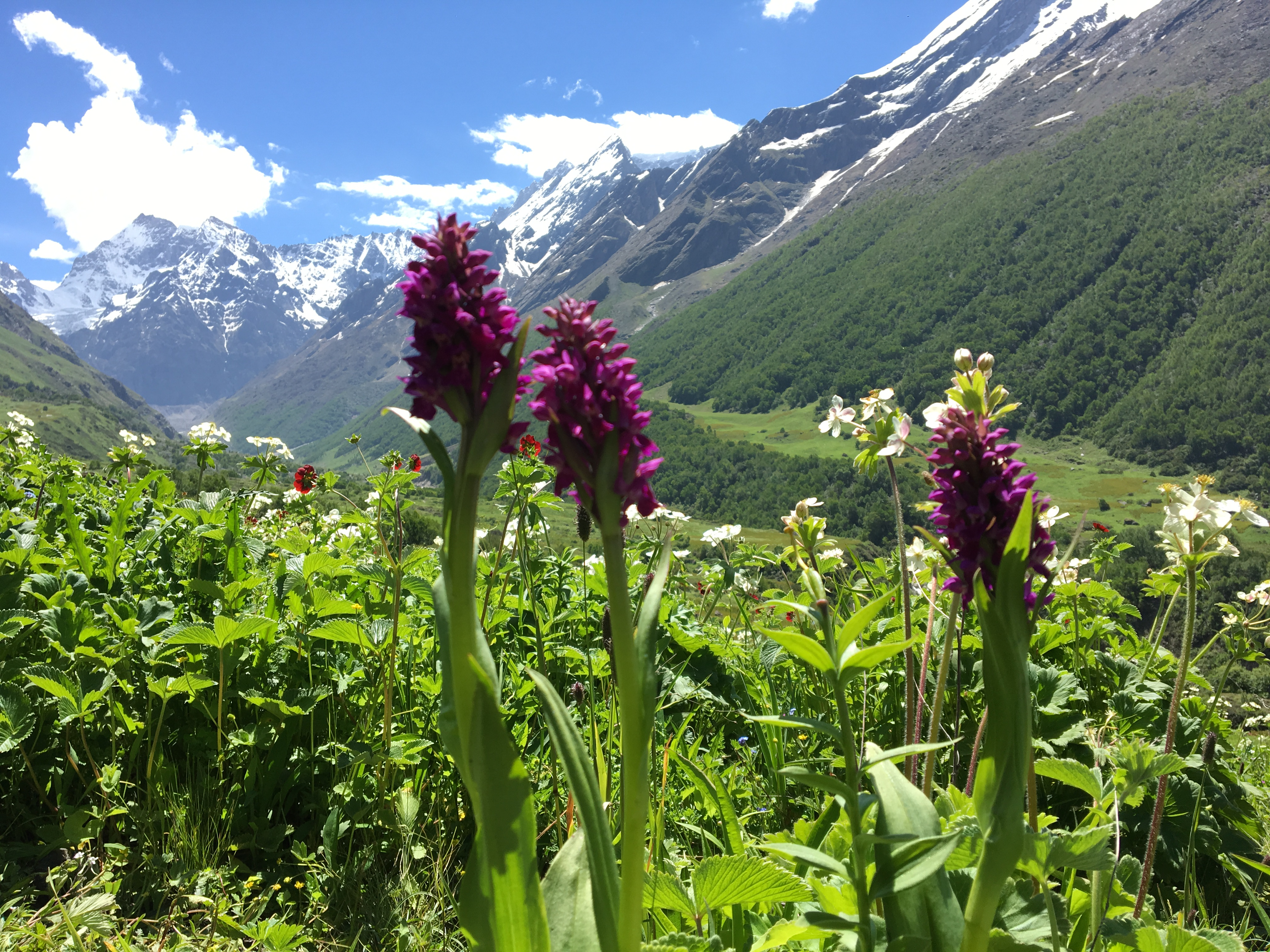
Beautiful purple flowers in VoF

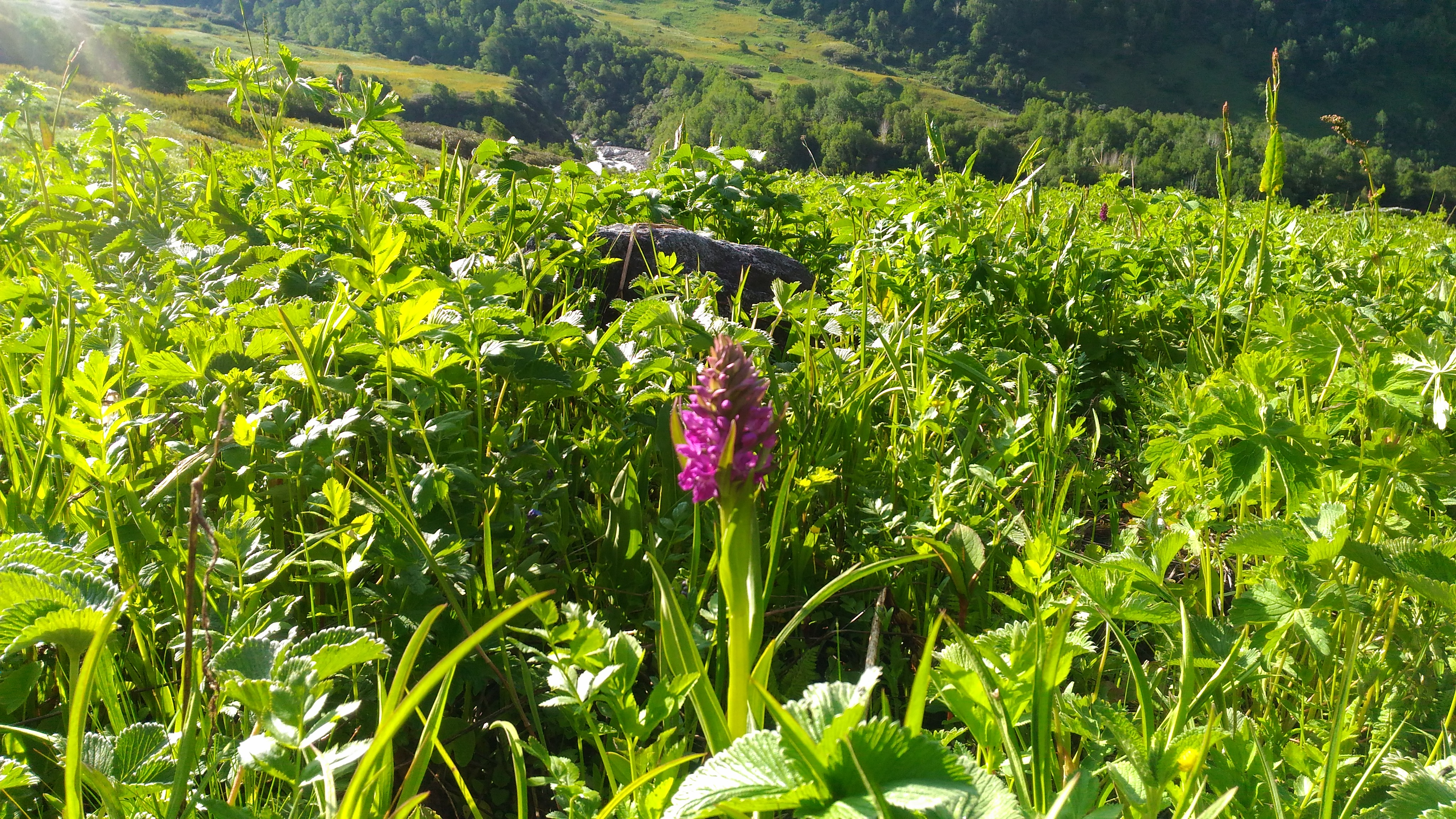
Beautiful flower snapshot

=== Flora ===
==== Three types of sub-alpine zones ====
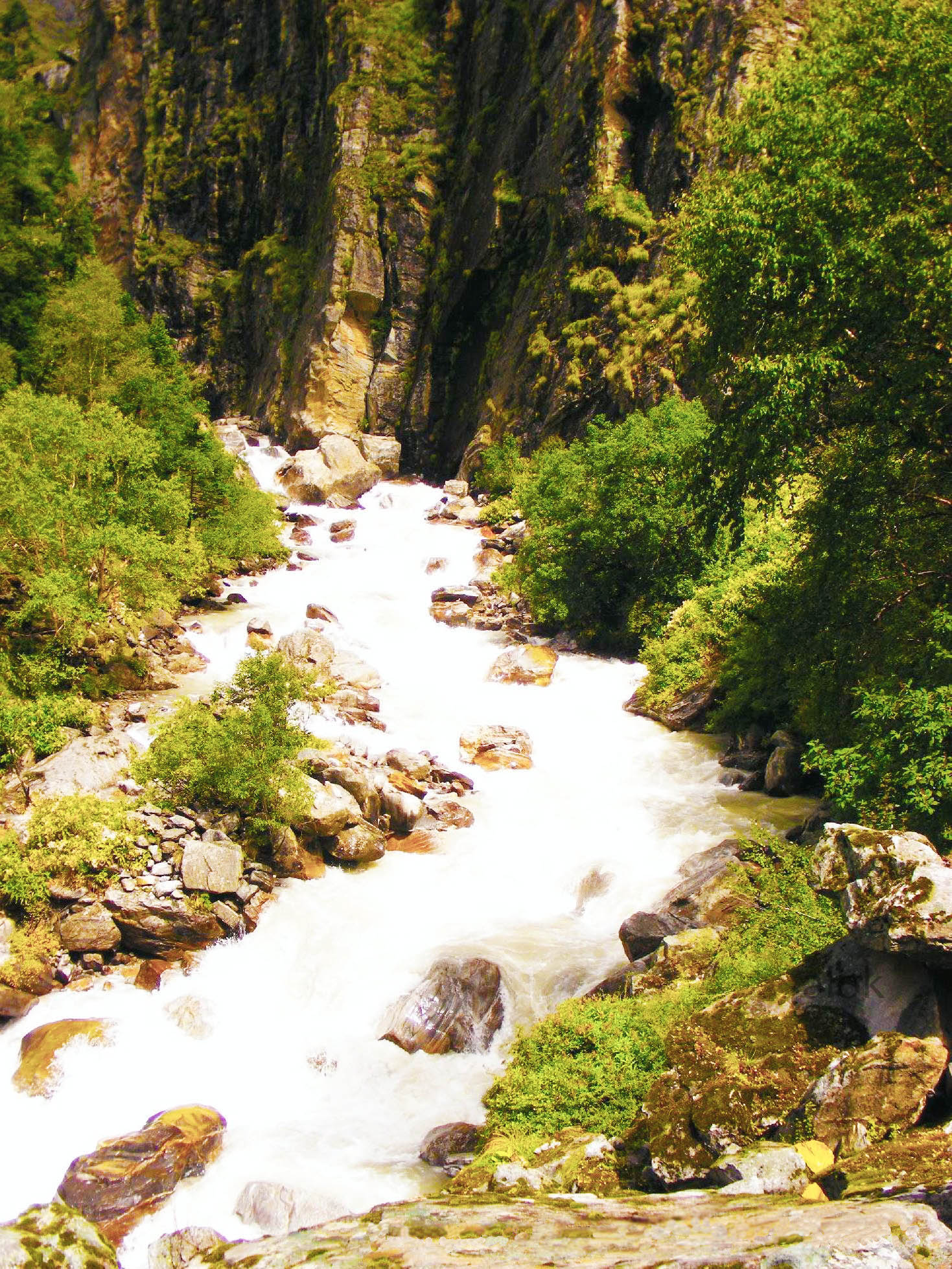
Pushpawati River rushing out of the Valley of Flowers.

The valley has three types of sub-alpine zones as follows: foothills alpine between 3,200 m and 3,500 m which is the upper height limit for trees, lower alpine between 3,500 m and 3,700 m, and higher alpine above 3,700 m. The habitats include valley bottom, river bed, small forests, meadows, eroded, scrubby and stable slopes, moraine, plateau, bogs, stone desert and caves. The lower surrounding hills in the buffer zone are thickly forested. The Forest Research Institute in 1992 recorded 600 species of angiosperms and 30 pteridophytes in the valley and surroundings, discovering 58 new records for the valley of which 4 were new for Himalayan state. Of these plants, 5 out of 6 species globally threatened are not found in Nanda Devi National Park or elsewhere in Uttarakhand: Aconitum falconeri, A. balfouri, Himalayan maple (Acer caesium), the blue Himalayan poppy (Meconopsis aculeata) and Saussurea atkinsoni. 31 species of rare and endangered categories were observed within the national park in 1998. Further his studies report that the dominant family in Valley of Flowers is Asteraceae with 62 species. 45 medicinal plants are used by local villagers and several species, such as Saussurea obvallata (brahmakamal) are collected as religious offerings to goddesses Nanda Devi and Sunanda Devi. The site is designated a Centre of Plant Diversity.

Characteristic of the sub-alpine zone are high altitude forests which help to retain moisture and snow and support a large number of floral and faunal communities. It is dominated by the uncommon Himalayan maple Acer caesium (VU), west Himalayan fir Abies pindrow, Himalayan white birch Betula utilis, and Rhododendron campanulatum with Himalayan yew Taxus wallichiana, Syringa emodi and Sorbus lanata. Some of the common herbs are Arisaema jacquemontii, Boschniakia himalaica, Corydalis cashmeriana, Polemonium caerulium, Impatiens sulcata, Geranium wallichianum, Galium aparine, Morina longifolia, Inula grandiflora, Nomochoris oxypetala, nemone rivularis, Pedicularis pectinata, P. bicornuta, Primula denticulate and Trillidium govanianum. In trampled areas where past livestock congregated, Himalayan knotweed Polygonum polystachium is a rampant weed.

==== Flowers ====
The flowers were surveyed and inventoried in 1987 by the Botanical Survey of India, in 1992 by the Forest Research Institute and in 1997 by the Wildlife Institute of India which found five species new to science.

Flowers mostly orchids, poppies, primulas, marigold, daisies and anemones carpet the ground. Sub-alpine forests of birch and rhododendron cover parts of the park's area. A decade long study by C.P. Kala from 1993 onward concludes that the Valley of Flowers is endowed with 520 species of higher plants (angiosperms, gymnosperms and pteridophytes), of these 498 are flowering plants. The park has many species of medicinal plants including Dactylorhiza hatagirea, Picrorhiza kurrooa, Aconitum violaceum, Polygonatum multiflorum, Fritillaria roylei and Podophyllum hexandrum.

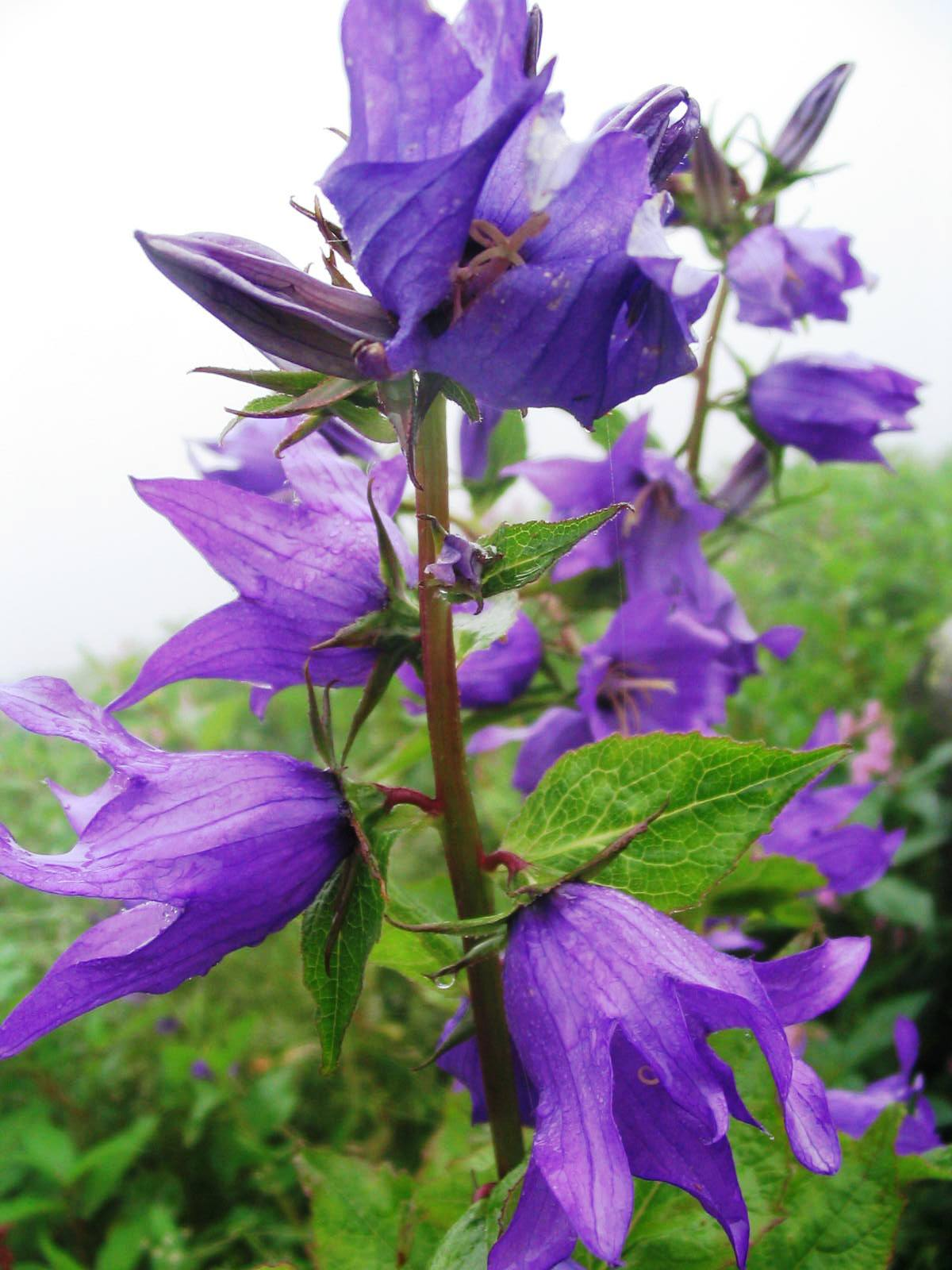
Himalayan bell flower, Campanula latifolia

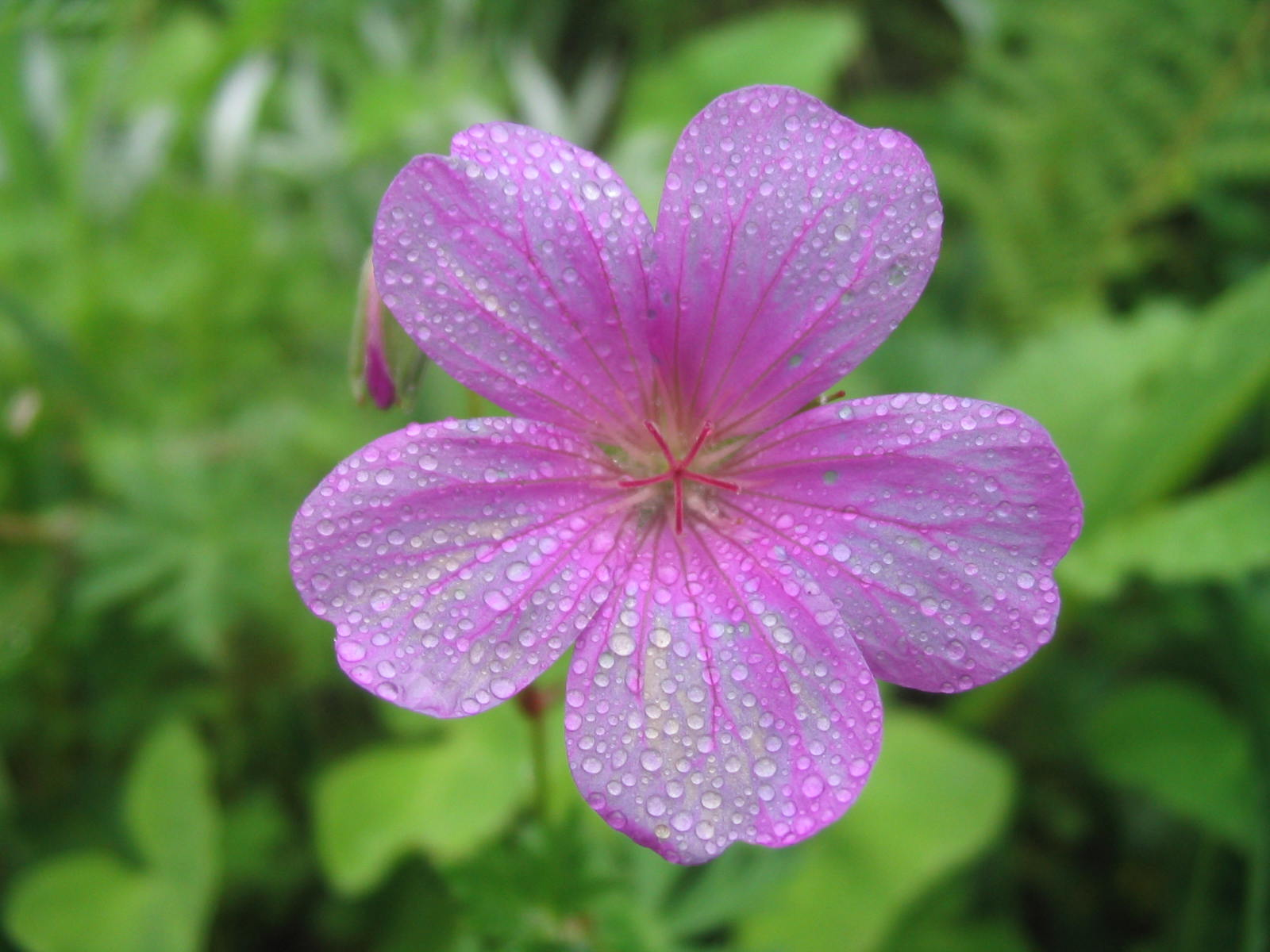
Morning dew on a pink flower, Geranium sp

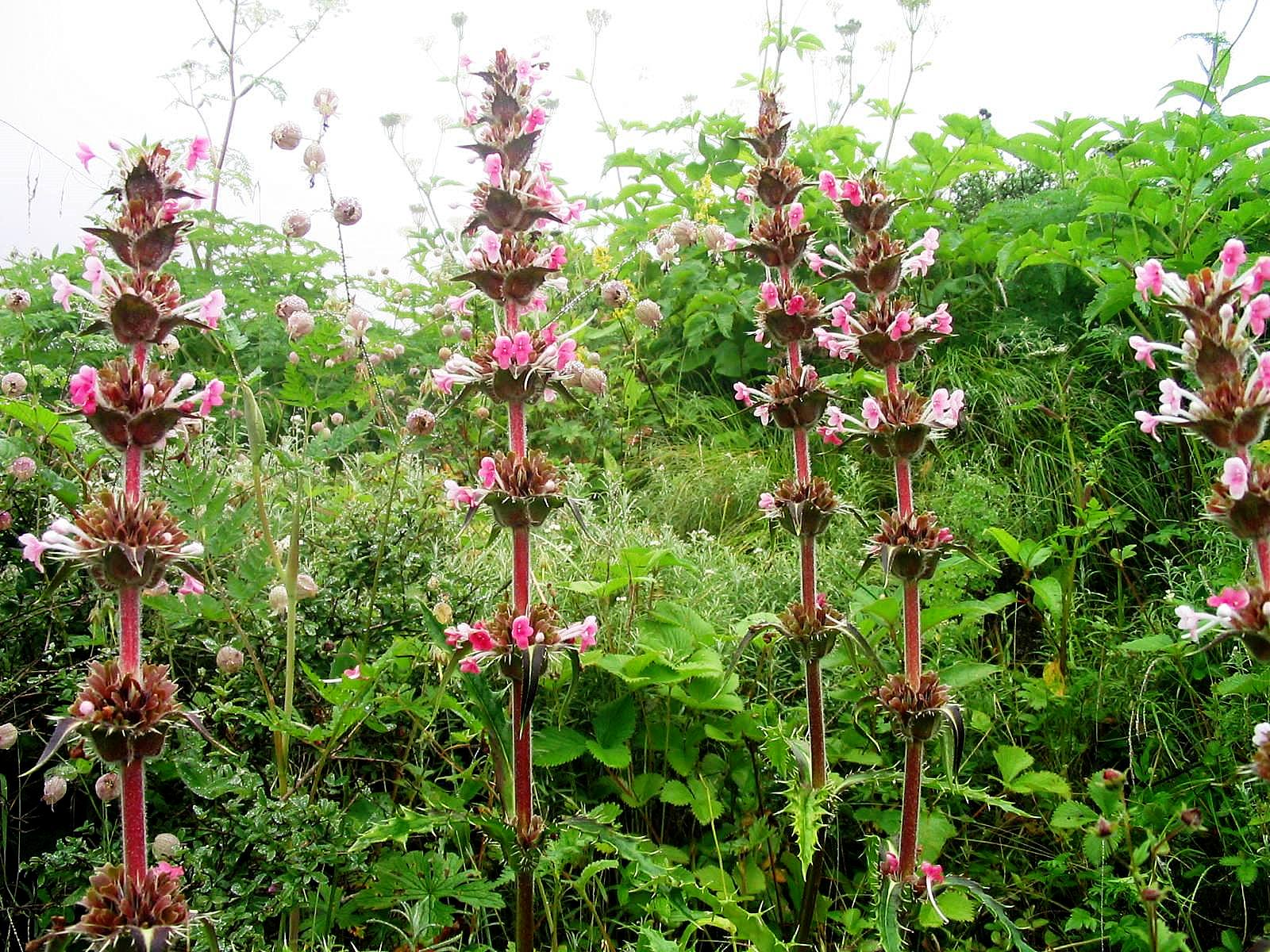
Multi storied flowers, Morina longifolia

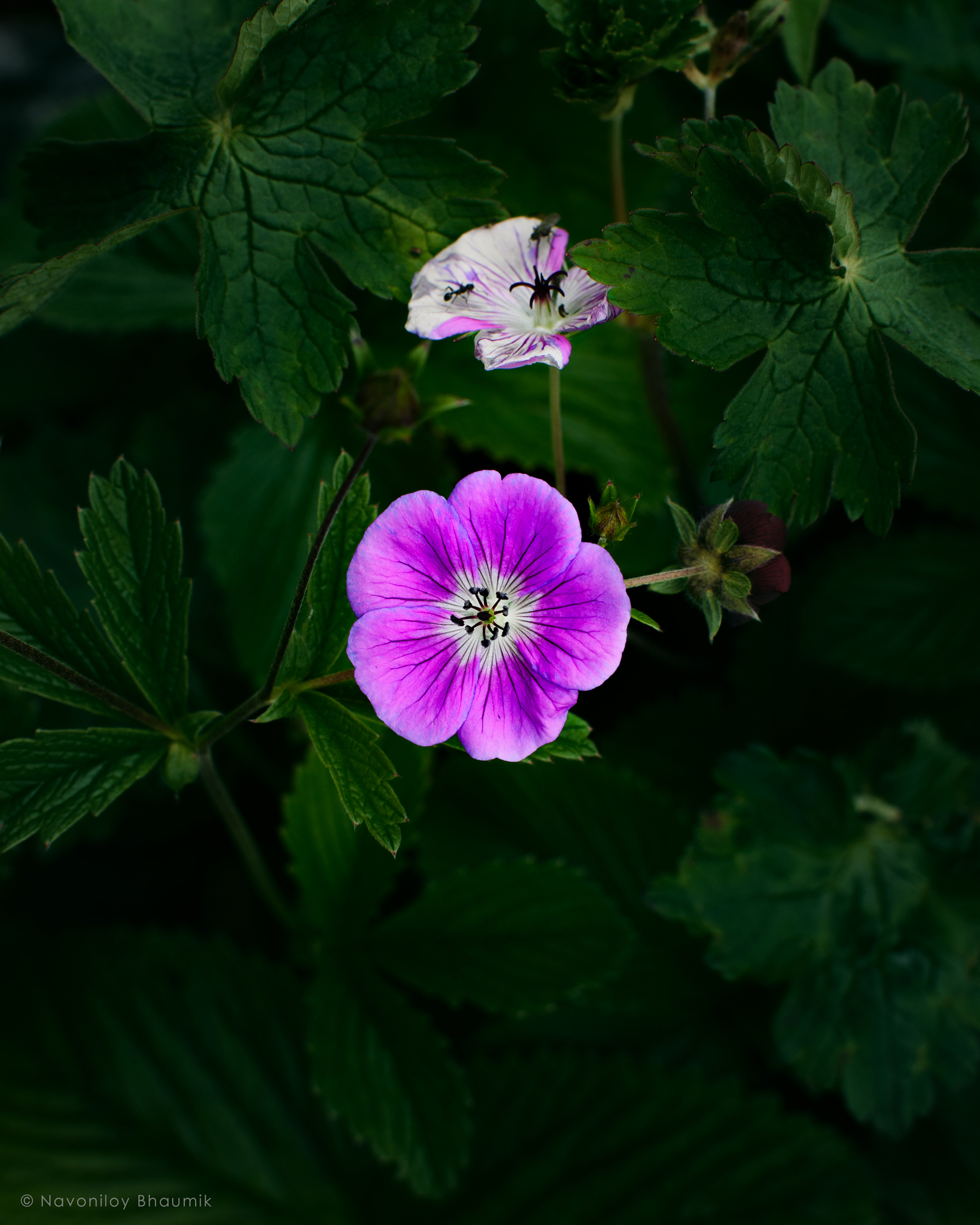
Meadow Geranium (Geranium pratense) in the heart of Valley of Flowers

=== Fauna ===
==== Species diversity ====
The density of wild animals in the valley is not high, but all the animals found are rare or endangered. Prior to 2004, a total 13 species of mammals were recorded in the park by C P Kala and its vicinity although only 9 species were directly sighted by him:

- northern plains gray langur Semnopithecus entellus,
- red giant flying squirrel Petaurista petaurista,
- Himalayan black bear Ursus thibetanus (VU),
- red fox Vulpes vulpes,
- Himalayan weasel Mustela sibirica,
- Himalayan yellow-throated marten Martes flavigula,
- Himalayan goral Naemorhedus goral,
- Himalayan musk deer Moschus leucogaster,
- Indian spotted chevrotain Moschiola indica,
- bharal or blue sheep Pseudois nayaur,
- Himalayan tahr Hemitragus jemlahicus (VU) and
- serow Capricornis sumatraensis (VU).

The tahr is common; the serow, goral, musk deer and bharal are rare.

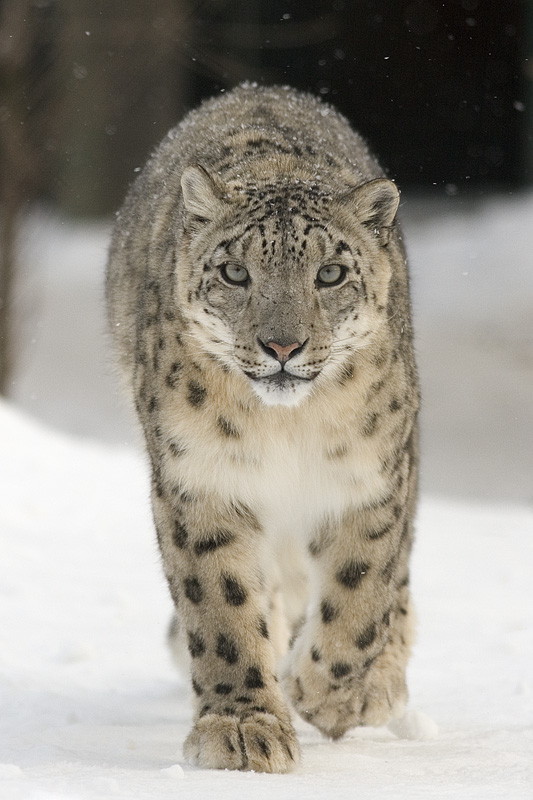
Snow leopard.

==== Leopards and bears ====
An October 2004 faunal survey established the presence of snow leopard Panthera uncia (EN) in the national park. The common leopard Panthera pardus is reported from lower parts of the valley closer to the villages. Local people have also reported sightings of brown bear Ursus arctos.

==== Reptiles ====
The most often seen reptiles are:

- the high altitude lizard Agama tuberculata,
- Himalayan ground skink Leiolopisma himalayana and
- Himalayan pit viper Gloydius himalayanus.

==== Bees and Butterflies ====
Along with the flowers are wild bees and many species of butterfly which need to be more researched. A few of the more evident species are:

- lime butterfly Papilio demoleus demoleus,
- common yellow swallowtail Papilio machaon,
- common Mormon Papilio polytes romulus,
- spangle Papilio protenor protenor and
- common blue apollo Parnassius hardwickei.

==== Birds ====
The area is within the West Himalayan Endemic Bird Area but there have been no surveys specific to the Valley. 114 species were seen in 1993 in Nanda Devi Park. Species frequently seen in the valley include:

- lammergeier Gypaetus barbatus,
- Himalayan vulture Gyps himalayensis,
- Yellow-billed chough Pyrrhocorax graculus,
- Red-billed chough P. pyrrhocorax,
- koklass pheasant Pucrasia macrolopha,
- Himalayan monal pheasant Lophophorus impejanus,
- scaly-bellied woodpecker Picus squamatus,
- yellownape woodpeckers P. flavinucha,
- Great barbet Megalaima virens,
- blue-throated barbet M. asiatica,
- snow pigeon Columba leuconota and
- spotted dove Stigmatopelia chinensis.

== Conservation ==
=== Conservation management ===
The park is administered by the Uttarakhand State Forestry Department, the national Ministry of Environment and Forests, India. There is no settlement in the national park and grazing in the area has been banned since 1983. The park is open only for 4 to 5 months during summer from June to October.

=== Research nursery and seed bank ===
A research nursery and seed/rhizome/tuber bank for propagating rare plants and valuable medicinal herbs has been created at Musadhar near the entrance of the site. Rare and valuable medicinal plants are the subject of special programs. These include Aconitum heterophyllum, A. falconeri, Arnebia benthamii, Dactylorhiza hatagirea, Gymnadenia orchides, Megacarpaea polyandra, Picrorhiza kurrooa, Podophyllum hexandrum and Taxus wallichiana. Research plots have been set up to determine the best way to control the spread of the tall Himalayan knotweed Polygonum polystachium without damaging other plants or the surface of the soil. A first annual survey was conducted in 2004 and will be repeated annually.

== See also ==
- Silent Valley National Park
- Yumthang Valley of Flowers in Sikkim
- Lakshman Ganga River
- Pushpawati River
