= Pushpawati River =

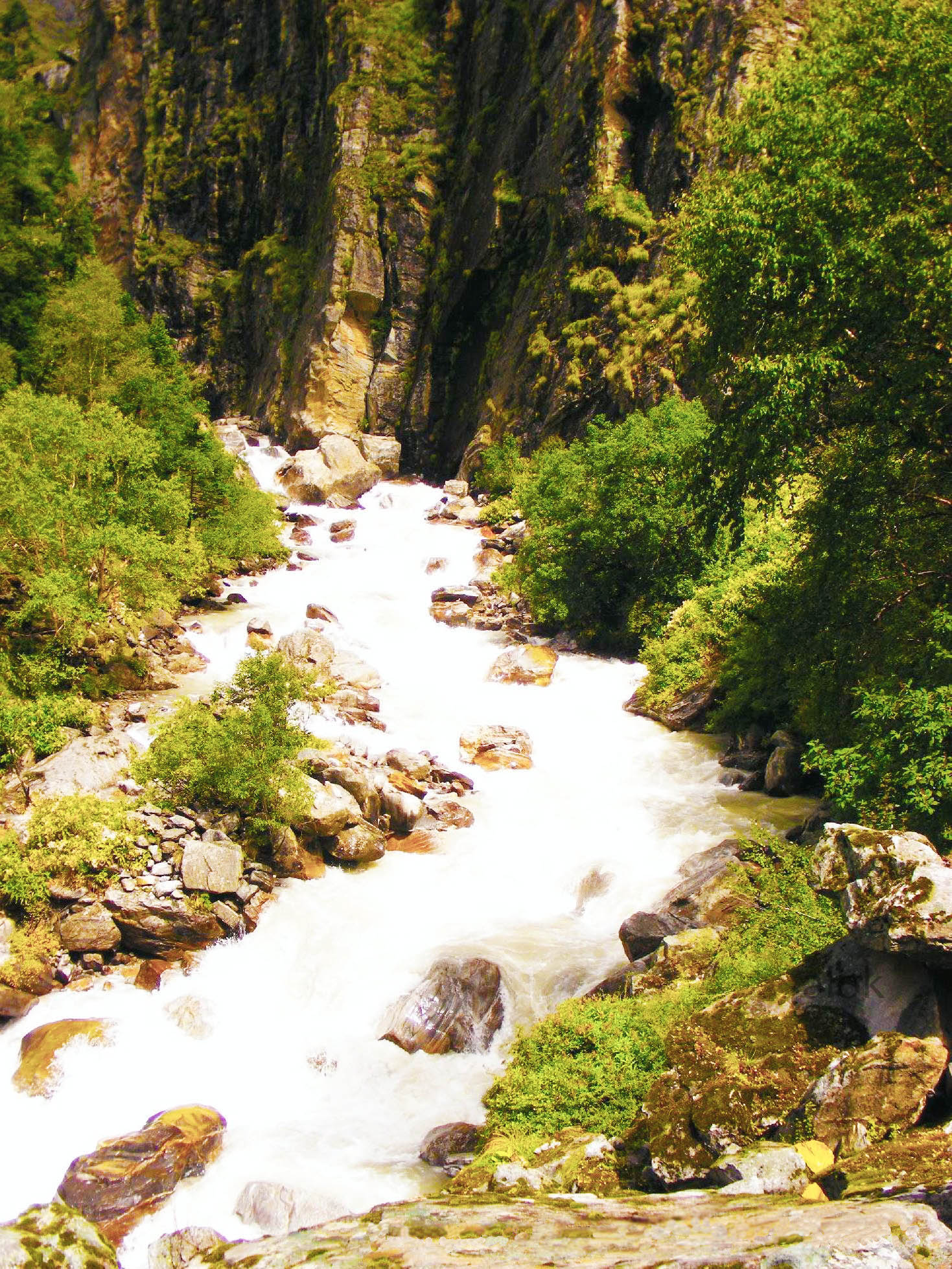
- The Pushpawati rushing out of Valley of Flowers

Location
- Country: India

Basin features
- River system: Alaknanda River

Pushpawati River flows through the Valley of Flowers in Chamoli district in Garhwal region of the Indian state of Uttarakhand.

== Course ==
The Pushpawati rises from the Tipra Glacier, near Rataban, in the central part of the Garhwal region in the Himalayas. It flows in a southerly direction to join the Bhyundar Ganga near Ghagharia. The combined stream is thereafter known as the Lakshman Ganga. The latter merges with the Alaknanda River at Govindghat.

The Pushpawati drains the Valley of Flowers.

The glaciated upper valley of the Pushpawati is U-shaped. The river flows past thick glacial deposits. A number of glacier-fed streams join it in its upper reaches. It flows through a gorge in its lower reaches. The upper tracts are under permanent cover of snow. Alpine, sub-alpine and temperate vegetation is there in the middle and lower catchments of the river. Human habitation is very sparse.

== Mythology ==
According to legend, the Pandavas, during their years of exile, saw flowers floating down the river. They named it Pushpawati.

== Gallery ==
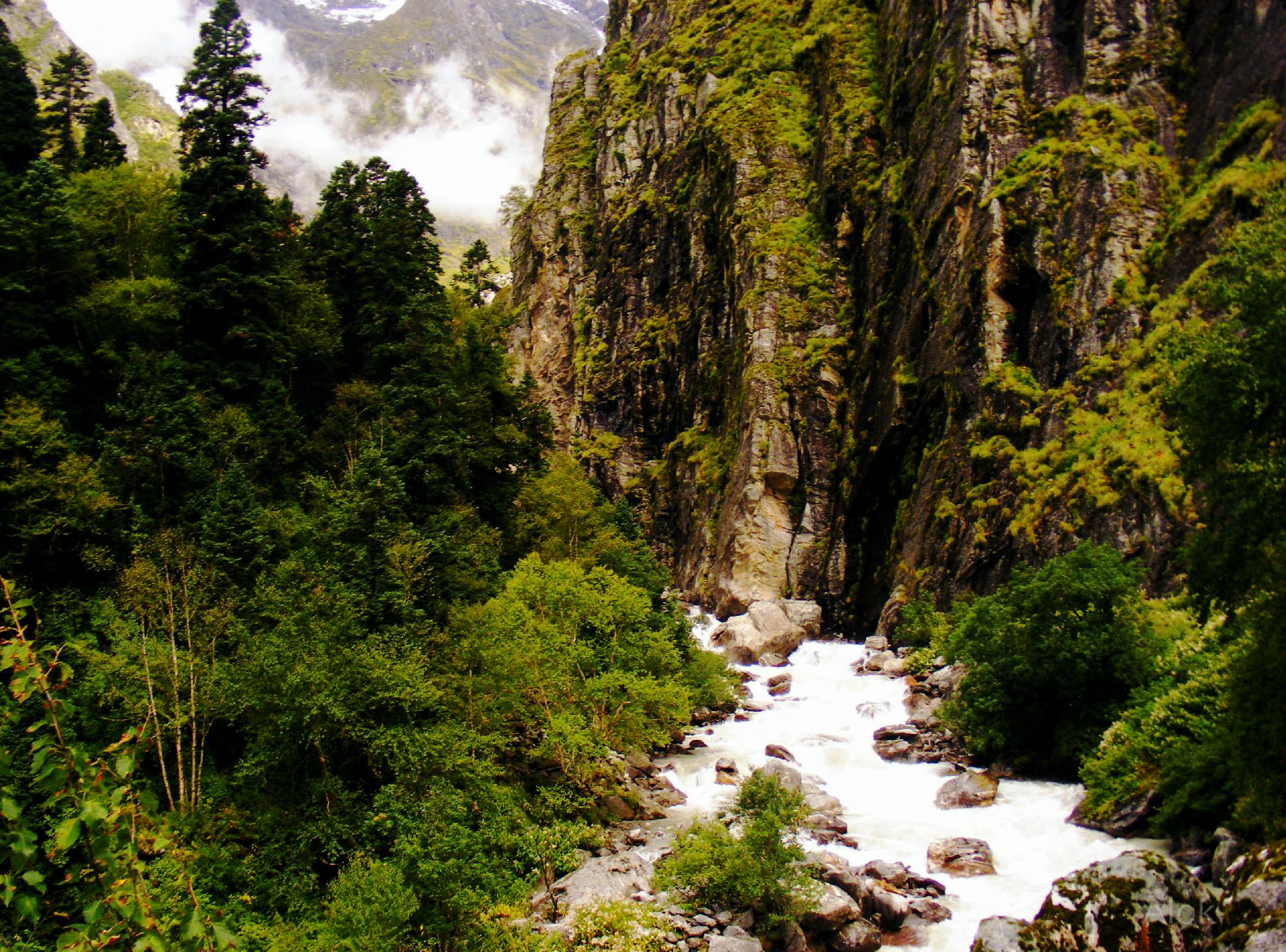
A view of Pushpawati from the gorge crossing while entering the Valley of Flowers

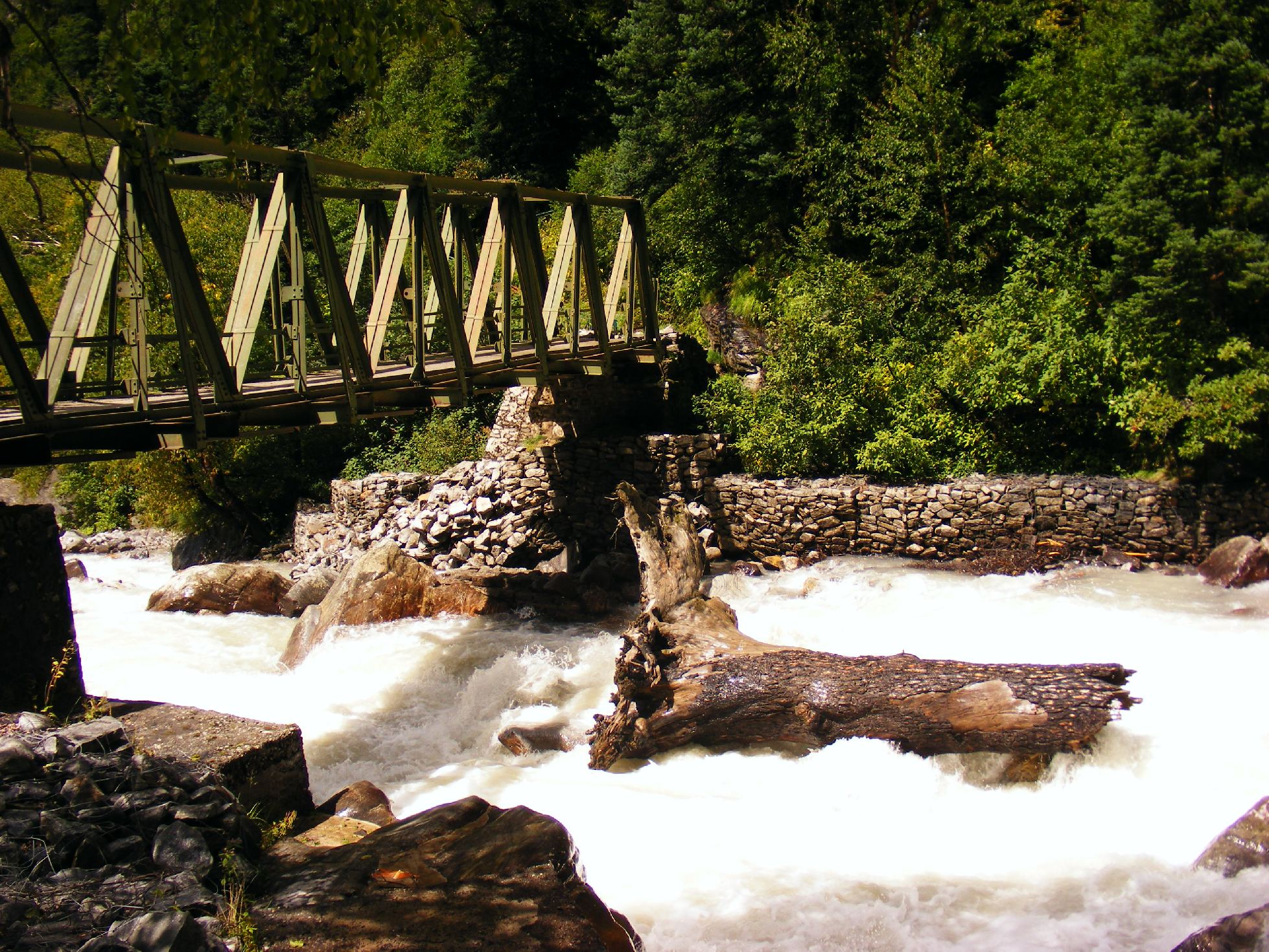
A bridge over Pushpawati River, while entering into the Valley of Flowers

== See also ==
- Valley of Flowers
- Gobindghat
