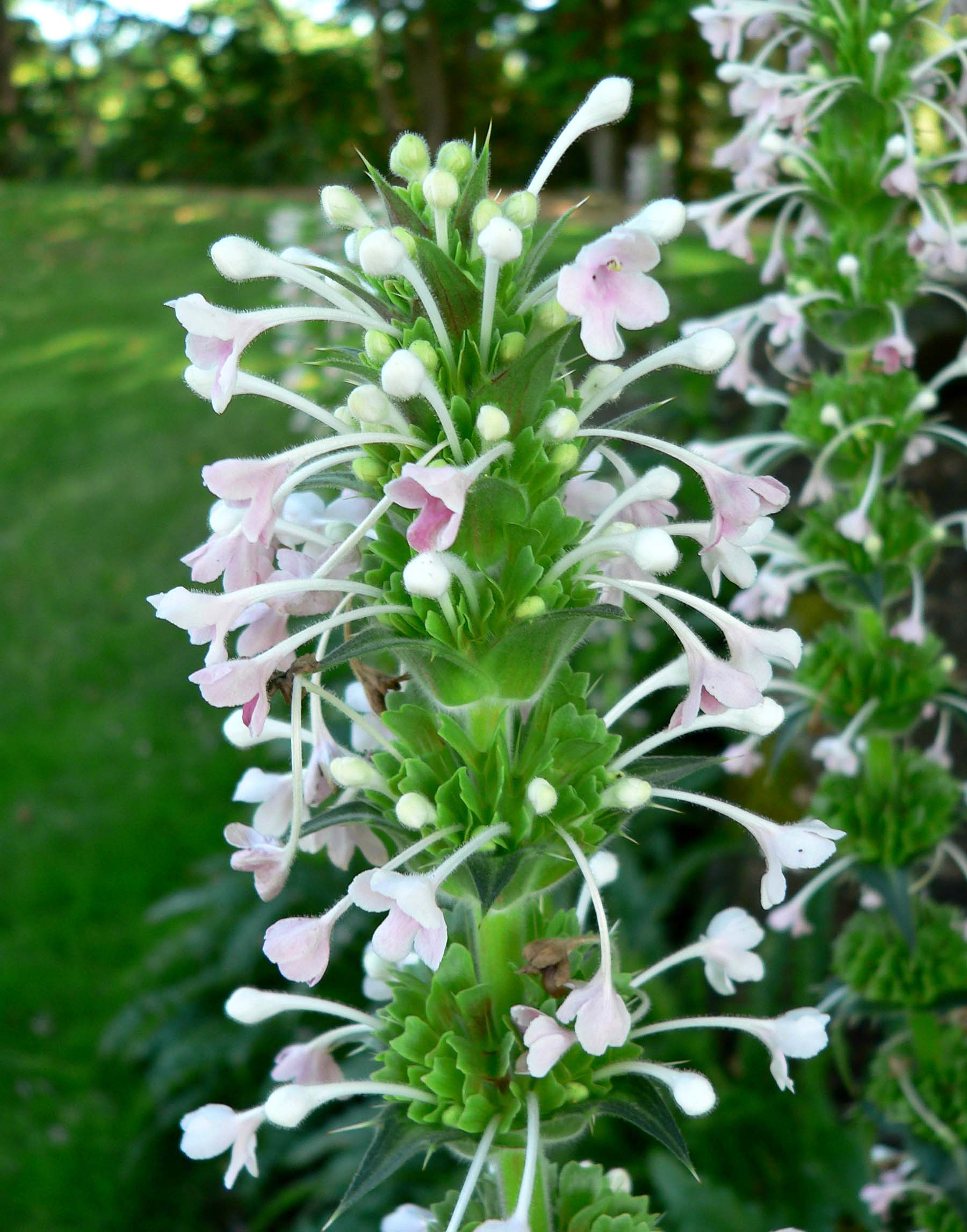
- Morina longifolia

Scientific classification
- Kingdom: Plantae
- Clade: Tracheophytes
- Clade: Angiosperms
- Clade: Eudicots
- Clade: Asterids
- Order: Dipsacales
- Family: Caprifoliaceae
- Subfamily: Morinoideae; Rafinesque

= Morinoideae =

Subfamily of flowering plants

Morinoideae is a subfamily of plants in the family Caprifoliaceae, order Dipsacales. It was at one time recognized as the separate family Morinaceae. The genus Morina has also been included in a separate family Dipsacaceae, currently included in Caprifoliaceae. Three genera have been included in this subfamily:

- Acanthocalyx

A. alba, A. albus, A. delavayi, A. nepalensis.

- Cryptothladia

C. chinensis, C. chlorantha, C. kokonorica, C. polyphylla

- Morina

M. couteriana, M. longifolia, M. persica
M. longifolia has the common names "whorl flower" and "Persian steppe flower." This species has cultivars: M. delavaya and M. wallichii.
