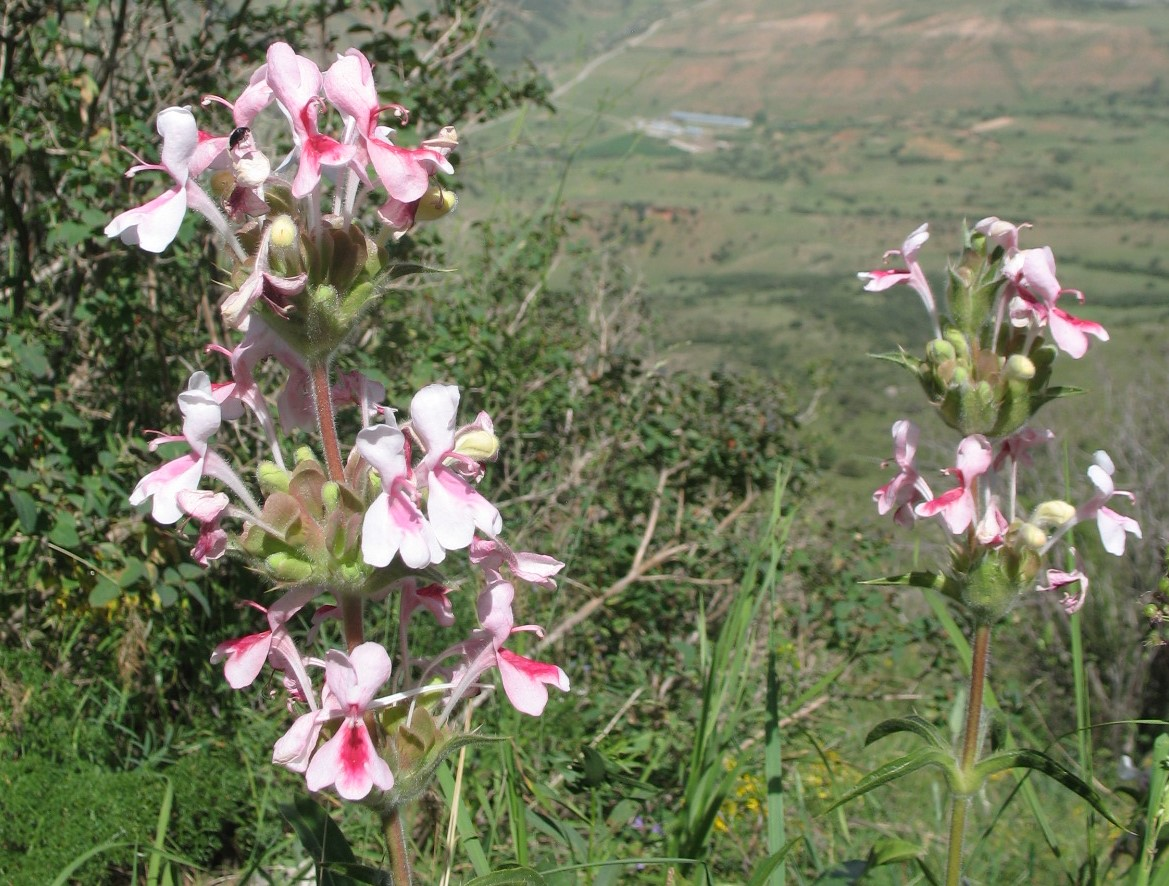
- Morina kokanica in the Karjantau Range, Kazakhstan

Scientific classification
- Kingdom: Plantae
- Clade: Tracheophytes
- Clade: Angiosperms
- Clade: Eudicots
- Clade: Asterids
- Order: Dipsacales
- Family: Caprifoliaceae
- Genus: Morina
- Species: M. kokanica

Binomial name
- Morina kokanica Regel, 1867

= Morina kokanica =

Species of plant

Morina kokanica is a species of perennial herbaceous plant in the family Caprifoliaceae. It was first described by Eduard August von Regel in 1867 and is native to the mountainous regions of Central Asia, where it typically inhabits mid-altitude zones. Morina kokanica is an endemic species of Central Asia.

== Etymology ==
The species epithet kokanica refers to Kokand, a historical region and city in the Fergana Valley of Uzbekistan.

== Description ==
Morina kokanica is a robust perennial herb that forms rosettes of sterile leaves and erect flowering shoots, typically reaching 60–80 cm in height. The rhizomes are woody, with the upper parts often covered by fibrous remains of petioles from the leaves of previous years.

The flowering stems are erect, somewhat square in cross-section, grooved and ridged. They are glabrous at the base and become covered with simple and glandular hairs towards the upper parts. Leaves on sterile shoots and the lowest stem leaves are glabrous, oblong-lanceolate, and measure 25–35 × 2–4.5 cm. The leaves are entire or rarely bear small teeth or prickles, with a prominent midrib that may extend into a small spine. Petioles are free or fused at the base to form a short sheath 2–4 mm long. Upper stem leaves are similar to the lower ones and are arranged either opposite or in whorls of three to four; their petioles are free. Basal leaves taper into long, narrow, winged petioles that broaden at the base, while the upper leaves are sessile and shorter.

The flowering stems bear well-separated whorls of numerous short-stalked flowers. Occasionally, short flowering shoots arise from the axils of the upper leaves. Bracts are arranged in whorls and are often leaf-like in the lowest whorl. They are broadly ovate with an acuminate, spine-tipped apex and a few rigid marginal spines. Bracts are somewhat villous on the underside, with their bases scarcely overlapping one another.

The involucel is cylindrical, measuring 5–6 × 3–4.5 mm at anthesis, and elongates to more than twice its length at maturity. It is villous and bears 12–16 teeth, two of which are longer than the others, though even the longest remain shorter than the tube. The calyx is cylindrical-campanulate, 5–6 × 3–4.5 mm, and often densely glandular-hairy. Its limb is 10–16 mm long, two to three times as long as the tube at anthesis, and is divided into shallowly bifid lobes with obtuse tips.

The corolla is pale purple or pink with a darker area on the lower lip. The tube is long and narrow, 35–45 × 1–3 mm, with a slightly swollen throat. The limb is deeply divided into lobes measuring 10–15 × 6–7 mm. The corolla tube is densely glandular-hairy, with the limb less hairy both inside and outside. The species has two fertile stamens, with filaments about 7 mm long, each bearing a tuft of hairs just below the anthers. The anther lobes are subequal, the longer measuring 2 mm and the shorter 1.7 mm. Two minute, heart-shaped staminodes are inserted 2–3 mm below the corolla mouth on the anterior side. A single three-lobed nectary is located at the base of the corolla tube on the anterior side. The style slightly exceeds the stamens, and the stigma is disc-shaped.

The fruit is an achene about 7 mm long, rugose and plano-convex, with prominent diagonal veins. It is flattened dorsally, ribbed ventrally, and has an obliquely truncate, somewhat fluted apex.

== Distribution and habitat ==
Morina kokanica is native to Central Asia, occurring in Kazakhstan, Kyrgyzstan, Tajikistan, and Uzbekistan. Within Uzbekistan, it is distributed mainly in the Western Tian Shan and associated mountain ranges, including the Ugam, Pskem, Chatkal, and Kuramin Ranges. Outside of the Western Tian Shan, it can be found on the slopes of the Zeravshan Range (Pamir-Alay mountains).

The species grows on pebbly and fine-soil slopes, typically in open areas of the mid-mountain belt at elevations of 1500–2000 m above sea level.

== Biology ==
The plant is adapted to rocky mountain slopes and open habitats where it can tolerate drought and high levels of sunlight. Flowering occurs from June to August, and fruiting from August to September.

== Conservation status ==
Morina kokanica was listed in the Red Data Book of the Kazakh SSR (1981) and is currently included in the Red Data Book of the Republic of Kazakhstan (2006). According to angiosperm extinction risk predictions, it is considered not threatened with extinction.
