= Lady Joan Legge =

English botanist (1885–1939)

- Born: 21 February 1885; Marylebone, London, England
- Died: 4 July 1939 (aged 54); Valley of Flowers, India
- Father: William Legge
- Relatives: William Legge (brother); Humphry Legge (brother)

Lady Joan Margaret Legge JP (21 February 1885 – 4 July 1939) was an English botanist who had a fatal accident while collecting samples in the Valley of Flowers in India.

== Early life ==
Legge was born at 55 Manchester St. in Marylebone, London, to William Legge, 6th Earl of Dartmouth, and Lady Mary Coke. She held the office of Justice of Peace for Staffordshire.

== Death ==
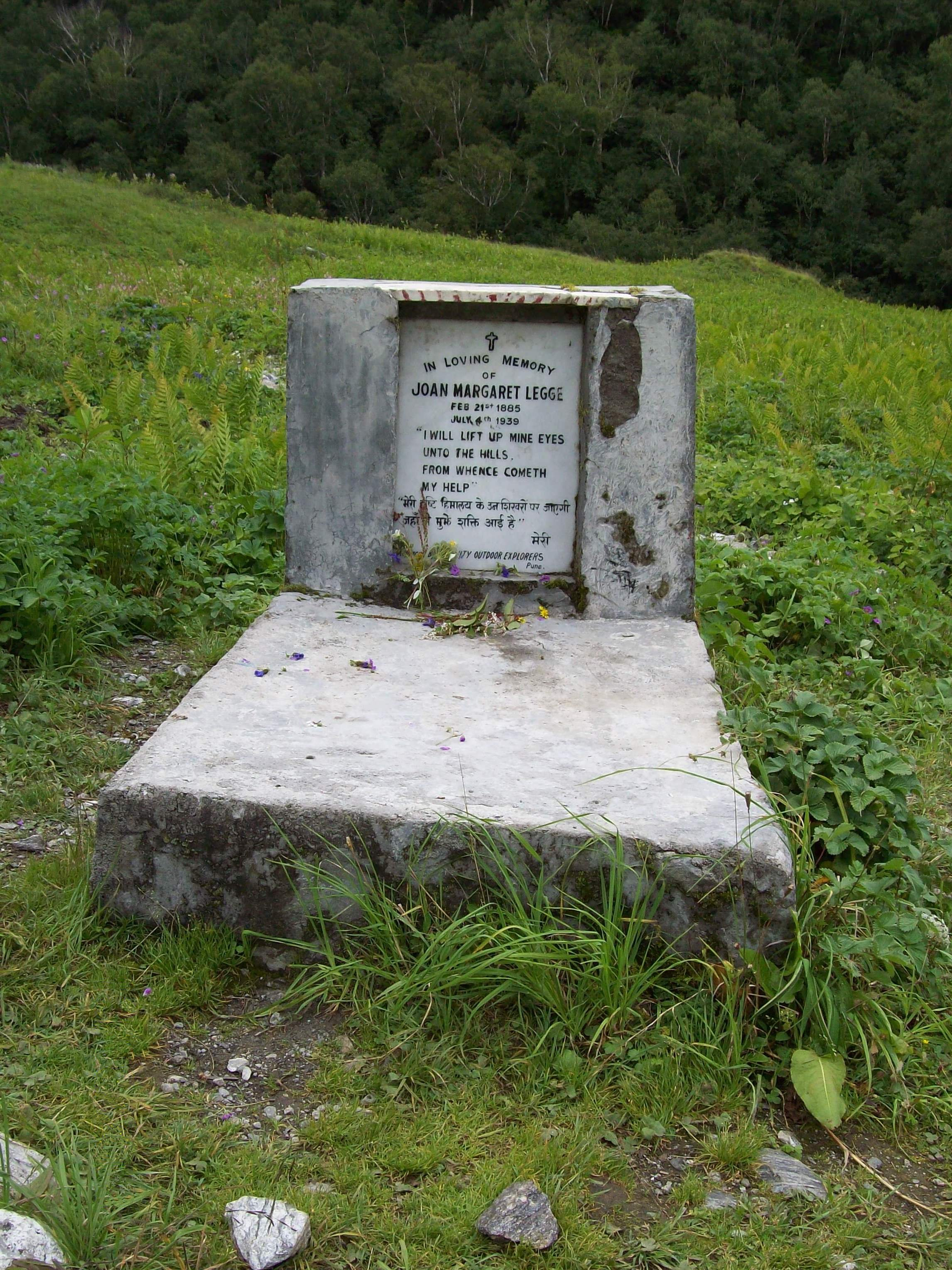
Tomb of Lady Joan Margaret Legge

In 1939, Legge went to India to study flora in the Valley of Flowers on behalf of the Royal Botanic Gardens, Kew. While traversing some rocky slopes to collect flowers, she slipped off and lost her life. She died unmarried at the age of 54.

Legge's sister came in search of her and built a tomb in the Valley of Flowers.

== Commemoration ==
In 2010 a new species of Impatiens found near the Valley of Flowers was named Impatiens leggei as a tribute to Legge.
