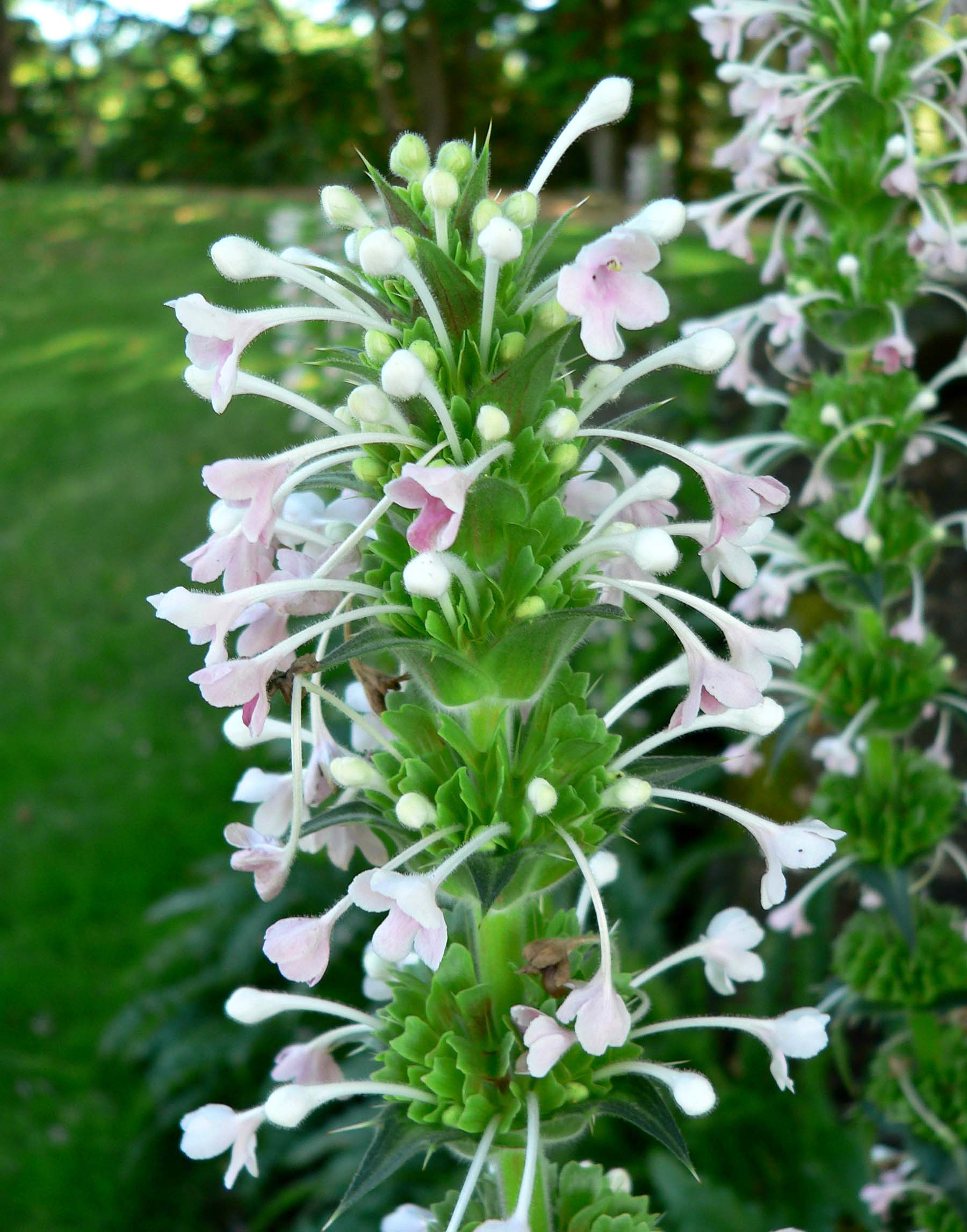
- Inflorescence of M. longifolia

Scientific classification
- Kingdom: Plantae
- Clade: Embryophytes
- Clade: Tracheophytes
- Clade: Spermatophytes
- Clade: Angiosperms
- Clade: Eudicots
- Clade: Asterids
- Order: Dipsacales
- Family: Caprifoliaceae
- Subfamily: Morinoideae
- Genus: Morina; L. (1753)

Species
- 14; see text

Synonyms
- Acanthocalyx (DC.) M.J.Cannon (1984); Asaphes Spreng. (1827), nom. illeg.; Cryptothladia (Bunge) M.J.Cannon (1984)

= Morina =

Genus of flowering plants in the honeysuckle family

Morina is a genus flowering plants in the family Caprifoliaceae. It includes 14 species native to Eurasia, ranging from southeastern Europe through Western and Central Asia to the Himalayas, China, Bangladesh, and Myanmar. It is named in honor of Louis Morin de Saint-Victor (1635–1715), a French physician, botanist and meteorologist.

It is unofficially the provincial flower of the Khyber Pakhtunkhwa province of Pakistan.

== Species ==
14 species are accepted.

- Morina alba Hand.-Mazz.
- Morina bracteata C.Y.Cheng & H.B.Chen
- Morina chinensis Y.Y.Pai
- Morina chlorantha Diels
- Morina coulteriana Royle
- Morina kokanica Regel
- Morina kokonorica K.S.Hao
- Morina longifolia Wall. ex DC.
- Morina ludlowii (M.J.Cannon) D.Y.Hong
- Morina nepalensis D.Don
- Morina parviflora Kar. & Kir.
- Morina persica L.
- Morina polyphylla Wall. ex DC.
- Morina subinermis Boiss.
