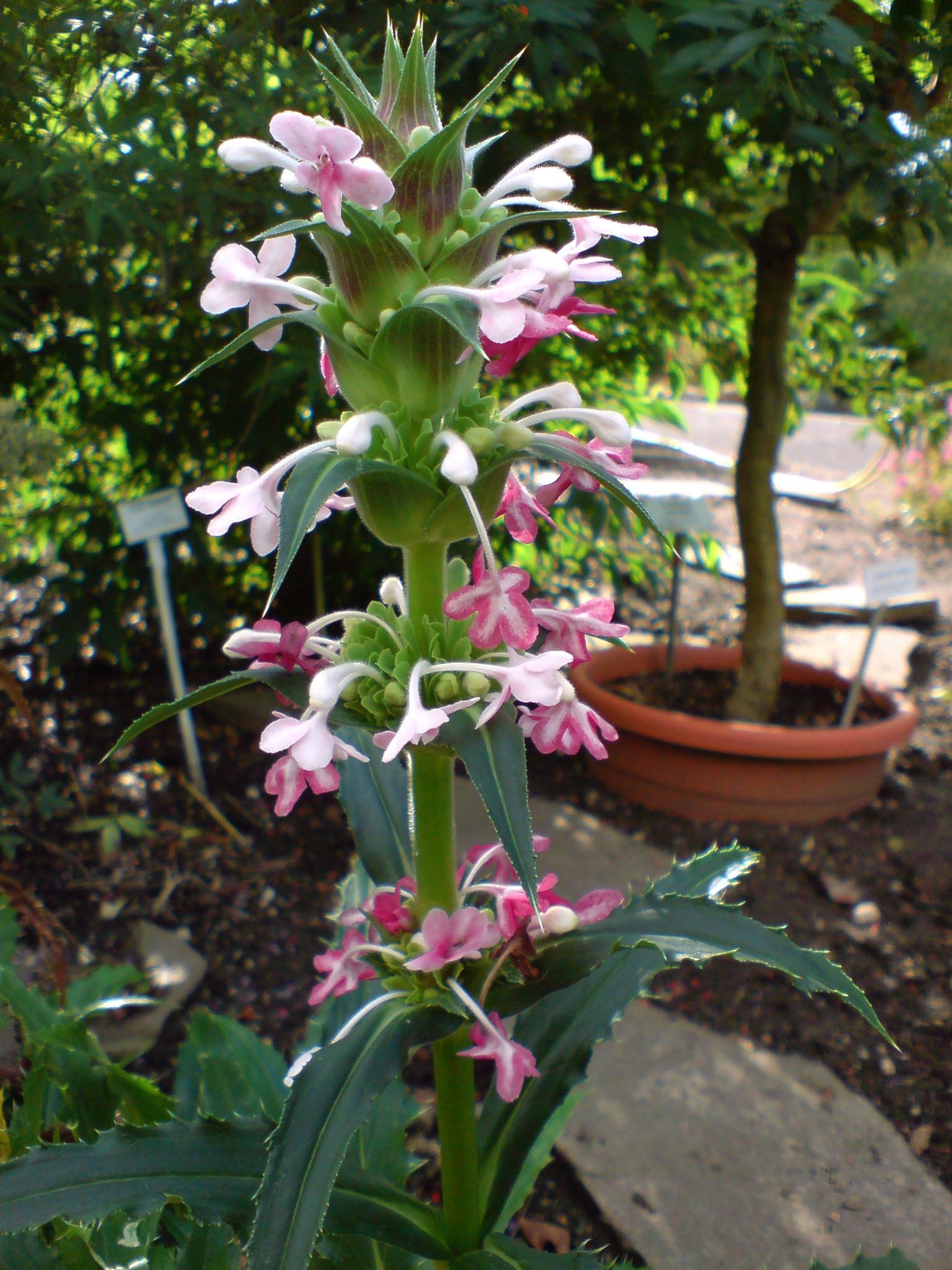

Scientific classification
- Kingdom: Plantae
- Clade: Tracheophytes
- Clade: Angiosperms
- Clade: Eudicots
- Clade: Asterids
- Order: Dipsacales
- Family: Caprifoliaceae
- Genus: Morina
- Species: M. nepalensis

Binomial name
- Morina nepalensis D.Don (1825)

Subspecies
- Morina nepalensis subsp. delavayi (Franch.) D.Y.Hong & L.M.Ma; Morina nepalensis subsp. nepalensis

Synonyms
- Acanthocalyx nepalensis (D.Don) M.J.Cannon (1984)

= Morina nepalensis =

Species of plant

Morina nepalensis is a species of flowering plant in family Caprifoliaceae. It a perennial which ranges from the Himalayas to southern Tibet, Bangladesh, northern Myanmar, and south-central China, where it grows in subalpine areas.

Two subspecies are accepted:

- Morina nepalensis subsp. delavayi (Franch.) D.Y.Hong & L.M.Ma (synonyms Acanthocalyx delavayi (Franch.) M.J.Cannon and Morina delavayi Franch.) – eastern Himalaya, Tibet, and south-central China
- Morina nepalensis subsp. nepalensis – Nepal, eastern Himalaya, southern Tibet, Bangladesh, and northern Myanmar
