= Ghangaria =

- village
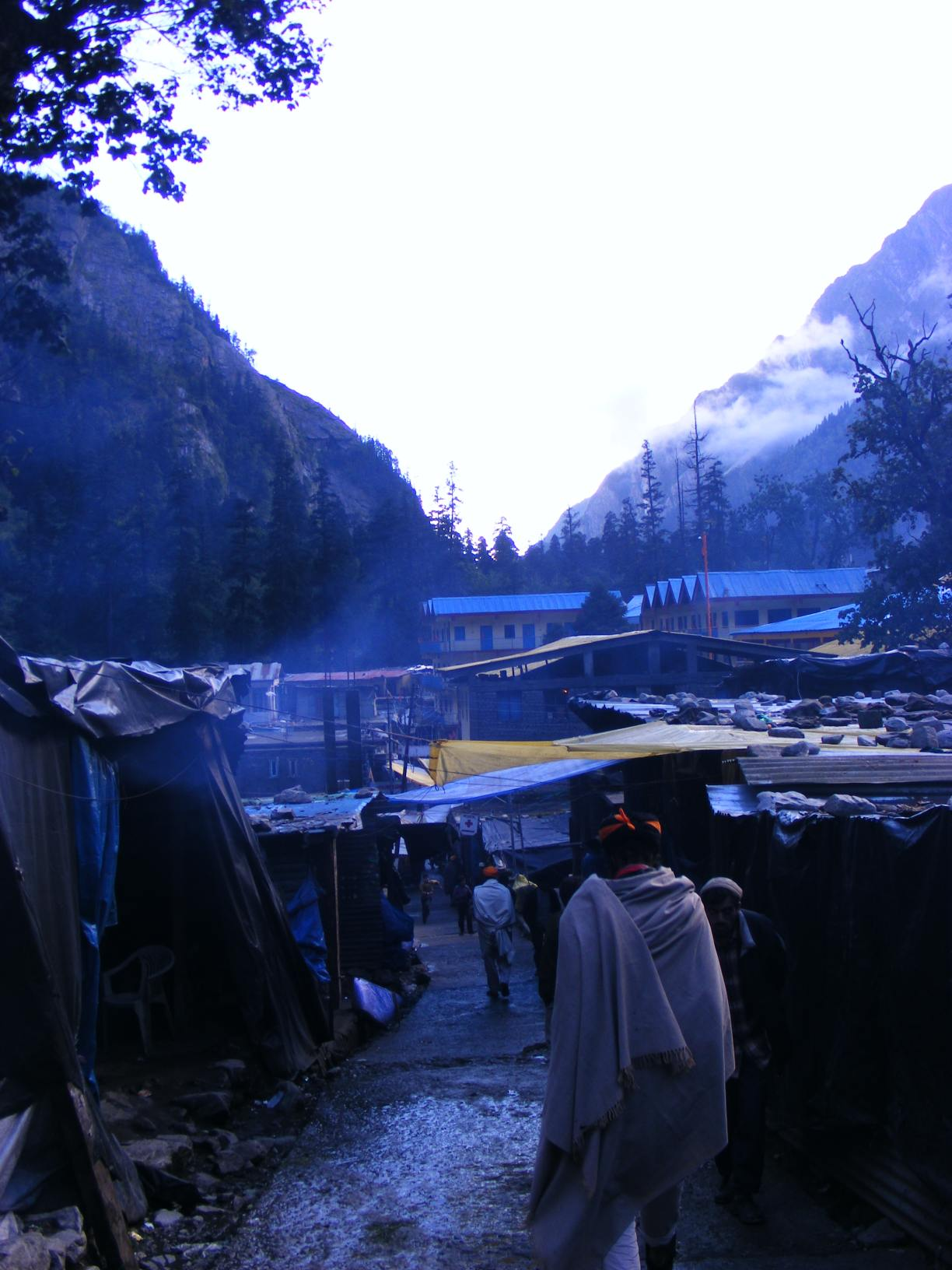

- Location in Uttarakhand, India Ghangaria (India)
- Coordinates: 30.701697°N 79.593587°E
- Country: India
- State: Uttarakhand
- Elevation: 3,049 m (10,003 ft)

Languages
  - Official: Hindi
  - Native: Bhotia
- Time zone: UTC+5:30 (IST)
- Vehicle registration: UK 11
- Website: uk.gov.in

Ghangaria is a village in Uttarakhand state of India. It is located at an altitude of 3049 meters.

Ghangaria is situated at the confluence of the river Pushpawati, which forms Lakshman Ganga, that later meets the river Alaknanda at Govindghat. It is the last human habitation in the Ghangaria valley. It is only open from June till October. The rest of the year, the valley is covered under snow.

== See also ==
- Pushpawati River
- Lakshman Ganga River
- Valley of Flowers
- Gobindghat
- Valley of flowers. Ghangaria is the base camp for Valley of Flowers trek.
