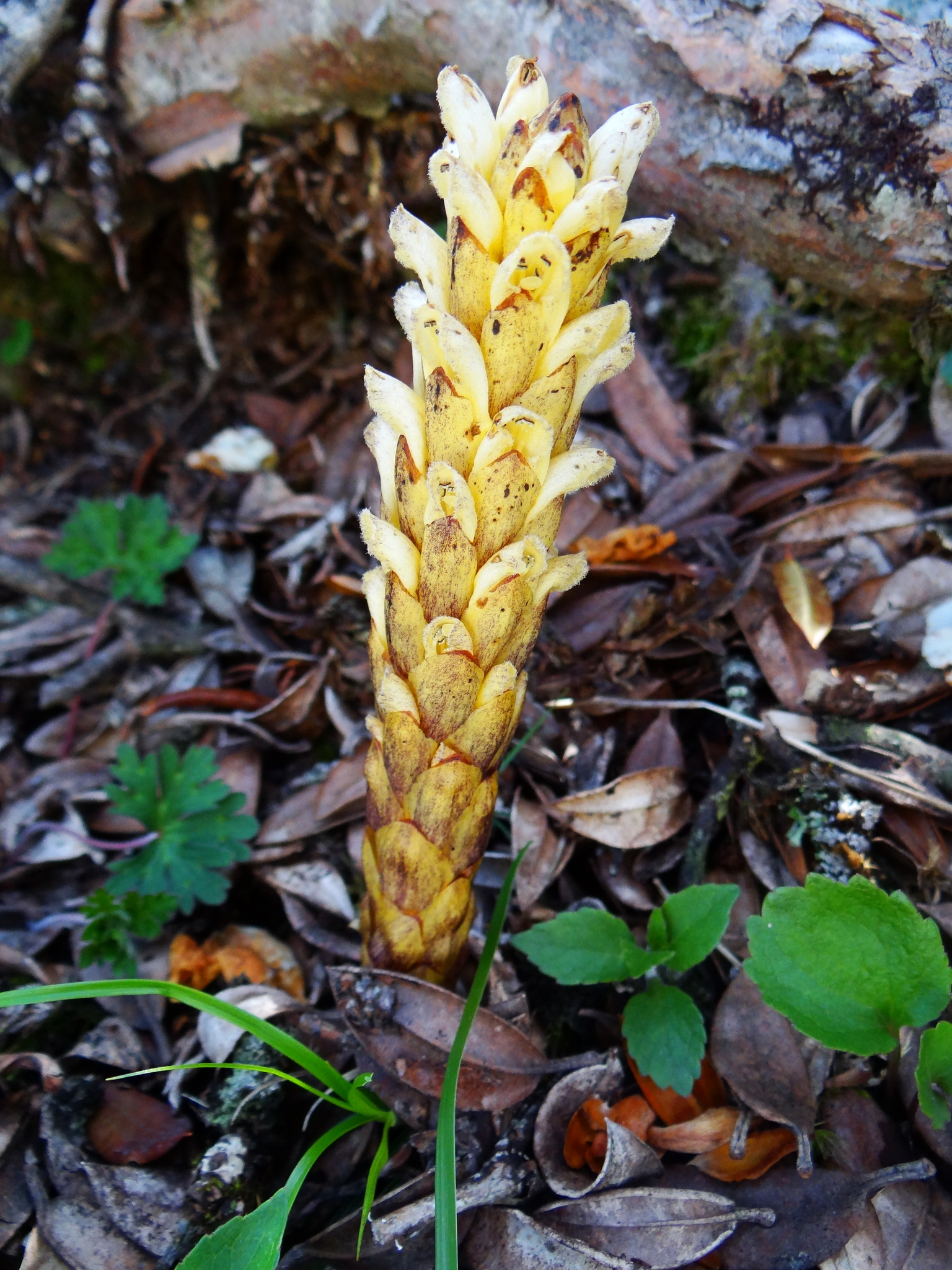
- Xylanche himalaica in Taiwan

Scientific classification
- Kingdom: Plantae
- Clade: Tracheophytes
- Clade: Angiosperms
- Clade: Eudicots
- Clade: Asterids
- Order: Lamiales
- Family: Orobanchaceae
- Genus: Xylanche; Beck
- Species: X. himalaica

Binomial name
- Xylanche himalaica (Hook.f. & Thomson) Beck

= Xylanche =

Species of flowering plant

Xylanche himalaica is a species of flowering plant in the family Orobanchaceae native to Asia. It was first formally named as Boschniakia himalaica in 1884 and transferred to the genus Xylanche in 1893. It is the only species in the genus Xylanche.

It is native to temperate and subalpine regions of the Himalayas, including China, Tibet, Taiwan, Bhutan, northern India, and Nepal. It parasitizes Rhododendron bushes in forested areas.
