= Govindghat =

- town
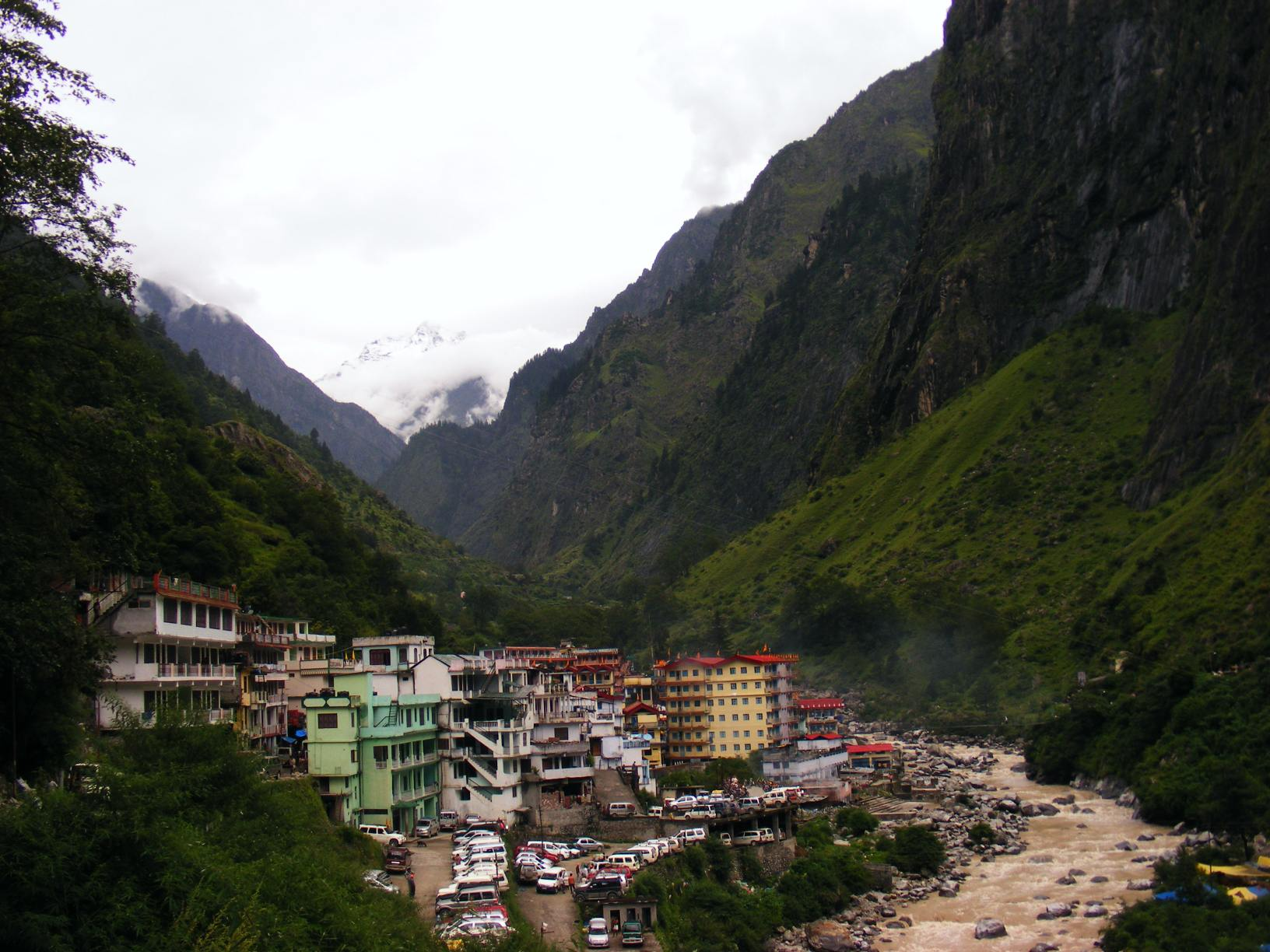
- Govindghat Town

- Location in Uttarakhand, India Govindghat (India)
- Coordinates: 30.62°N 79.55°E
- Country: India
- State: Uttarakhand
- Elevation: 1,828 m (5,997 ft)

Languages
  - Official: Hindi, Garhwali
- Time zone: UTC+5:30 (IST)
- Vehicle registration: UK 11
- Website: uk.gov.in

Govindghat is a town in Chamoli district, Uttarakhand, India, located at the confluence of the Alaknanda and the Lakshman Ganga rivers. It lies around 22 kilometres (14 mi) from Joshimath on NH58 at an altitude of 6,000 feet (1,800 metres).

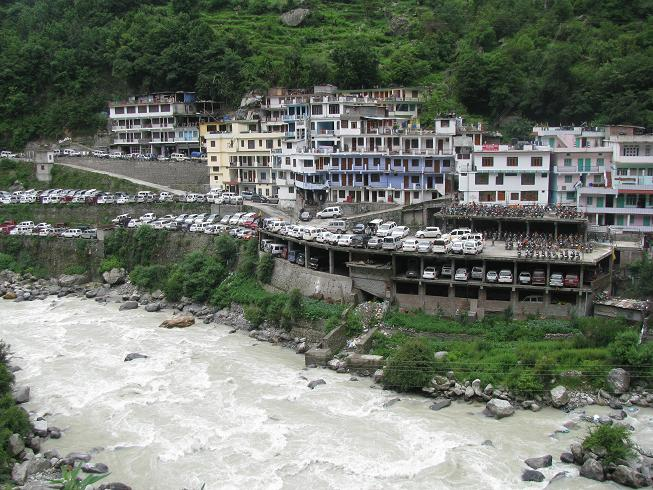
Govindghat, as seen after crossing Alaknanda River

== See also ==
- River Pushpawati
- Ghangaria
