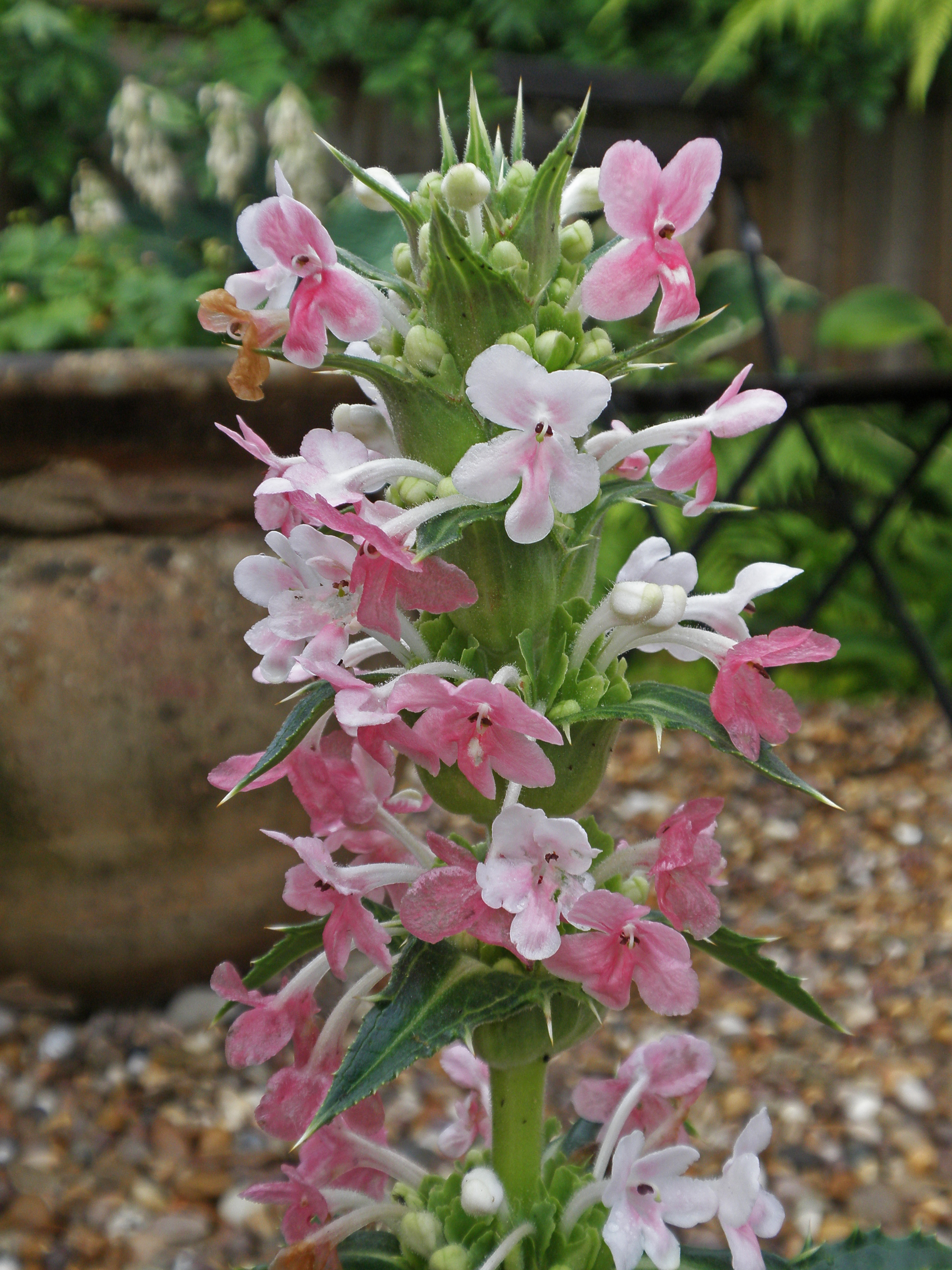
- In a garden setting
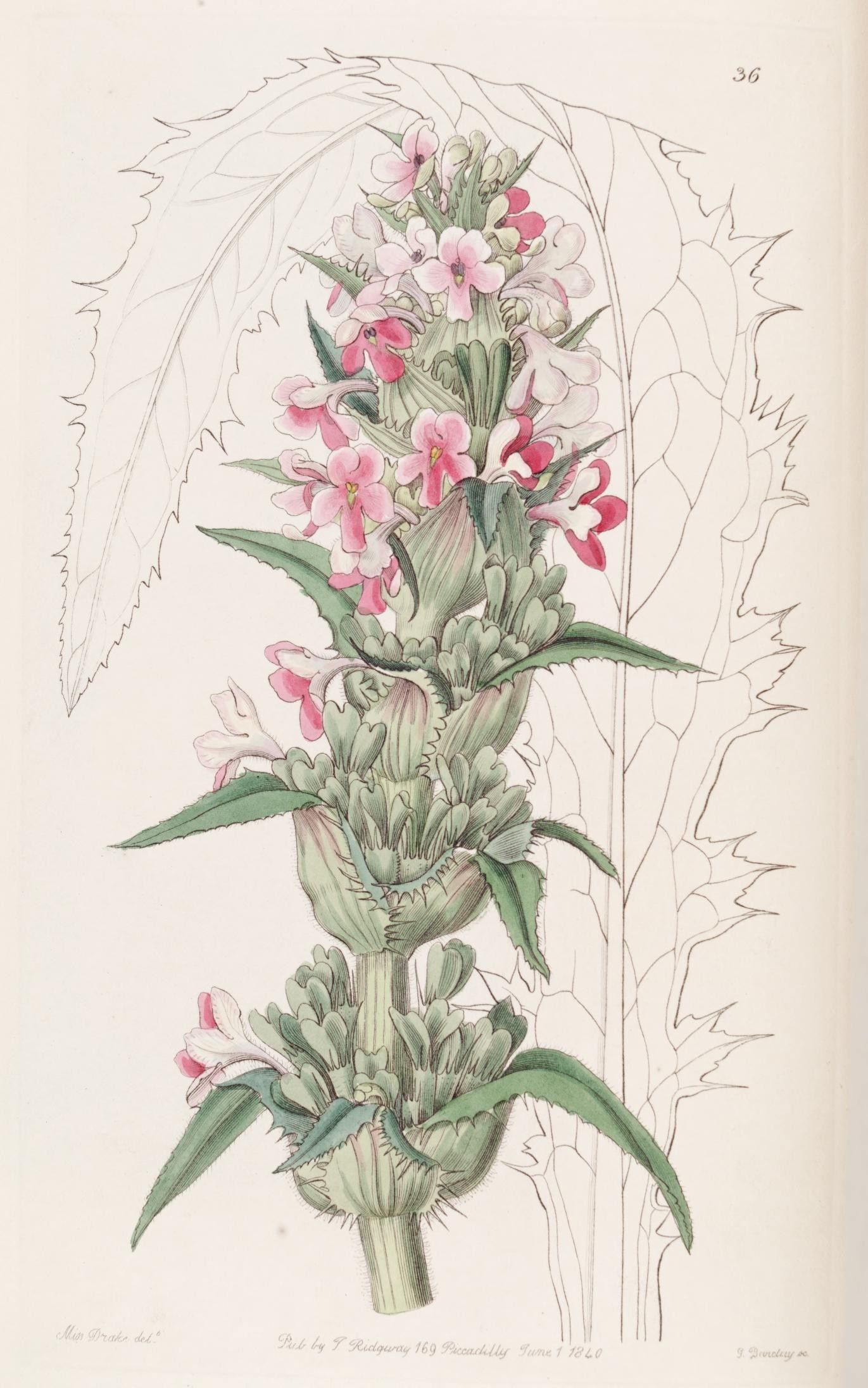
- Botanical illustration

Scientific classification
- Kingdom: Plantae
- Clade: Embryophytes
- Clade: Tracheophytes
- Clade: Spermatophytes
- Clade: Angiosperms
- Clade: Eudicots
- Clade: Asterids
- Order: Dipsacales
- Family: Caprifoliaceae
- Genus: Morina
- Species: M. longifolia

Binomial name
- Morina longifolia Wall. ex DC.

Synonyms
- Morina elegans Fisch. & Avé-Lall.

= Morina longifolia =

Species of flowering plant

Morina longifolia, the Himalayan whorlflower or long-leaved whorlflower, is a species of flowering plant in the family Caprifoliaceae, native to the foothills of the Himalayas. A perennial hardy to USDA zone 6a, it is recommended for borders and beds, in courtyard, cottage, gravel and rock gardens, but is subject to rot if there is too much shade. Its habitats include open slopes and alpine shrubberies.
