= C. brassii =

C. brassii may refer to:

- Calanthe brassii, a species of orchid in the genus Calanthe
- Calophyllum brassii, a species of tree
- Capparis brassii, a species of caperbush in the genus Capparis
- Casearia brassii, a species of tree in the genus Casearia
- Catanthera brassii, a species of flowering plant Catanthera
- Chaetomitrium brassii, a species of moss in the genus Chaetomitrium
- Chionanthus brassii, a species of tree in the genus Chionanthus
- Clutia brassii, a species of flowering plant in the genus Clutia
- Coffea brassii, a species of coffee plant
- Coprosma brassii, a species of flowering plant in the genus Coprosma
- Corsia brassii, a species of mycoheterotrophic plant in the genus Corsia
- Croton brassii, a species of flowering plant in the genus Croton
- Cryptocarya brassii, a species of laurel
- Cyrtosperma brassii, a species of aroid in the genus Cyrtosperma
