= Wilfred Borden Schofield =

Botanist and bryologist (1927–2008)

Wilfred "Wilf" Borden Schofield (Botanist) (19 July 1927 – 5 November 2008) was a Canadian botanist, specializing in mosses and liverworts. He was considered by many "the foremost bryologist in Canada".

== Biography ==
Wilfred B. Schofield, who had two brothers and a sister, was born in Brooklyn Corner, Kings County, Nova Scotia and grew up in Nova Scotia. He received in 1950 a B.A. from Acadia University, where he was influenced by E. Chalmers Smith (1912–1992) and John S. Erskine (1900–1981). In 1951 Schofield obtained a Class A teacher's license from Nova Scotia Normal College. From 1951 to 1954 he was a high school geology teacher in Nova Scotia. He became in 1954 a graduate student at Stanford University, where he met Margaret "Peggy" Irene Bledsoe (1931–2005). In 1956 they both received their M.A.s (he in botany and she in music) and married in the autumn of that year. After their honeymoon, the newlyweds moved to Nova Scotia, where Wilfred Schofield spent the winter teaching high school. The couple spent the summer of 1957 doing field work in the Yukon and then in the autumn moved to North Carolina.

From 1967 to 1969 he was the president of the Sullivant Moss Society, which was renamed in 1970 the American Bryological and Lichenological Society. For his textbook Introduction to Bryology (Macmillan, 1985), the Canadian Botanical Association awarded him the George Lawson Medal for 1986. In 1990 he was awarded an honorary D.Sc. by Acadia University.

He collected plants not only in Canada and the mainland USA, but also in Australia, New Zealand, Hawaii, Japan, and Taiwan. He did most of his field work in British Columbia, especially Haida Gwaii (formerly known as the Queen Charlotte Islands).From 1969 to 1997 Schofield issued the exsiccata series Bryophyta Canadensia distributed by the University of British Columbia edited by W. B. Schofield. In the last 15 years of his life, he spent summers collecting in the Aleutian Islands.

Schofield was predeceased by his wife. Upon his death he was survived by three daughters, and four grandchildren.

== Eponymy ==
=== Genera ===
- (Cephaloziaceae) Schofieldia
- (Hylocomiaceae) Schofieldiella

=== Species ===
- (Andreaeaceae) Andreaea schofieldiana B.M.Murray
- (Symphyodontaceae) Chaetomitrium schofieldii B.Tan & H.Rob.
- (Hypnaceae) Ctenidium schofieldii H.Nishim.
- (Cladoniaceae) Cladonia schofieldii Ahti & Brodo
- (Plagiochilaceae) Plagiochila schofieldiana Inoue
- (Sphagnaceae) Sphagnum wilfii H.A.Crum
- (Plagiotheciaceae) Plagiothecium schofieldii G.J.Wolski & W.R.Buck
- (Verrucariaceae) Verrucaria schofieldii Brodo

== Selected publications ==
=== Articles ===
- Steere, William C.; Schofield, Wilfred B. (1956). "Myuroclada, a Genus New to North America". The Bryologist. 59 (1): 1–5. doi:10.2307/3240281. ISSN 0007-2745. JSTOR 3240281.
- Schofield, W. B. (1966). "Crumia, A New Genus of the Pottiaceae Endemic to Western North America". Canadian Journal of Botany. 44 (5): 609–614. Bibcode:1966CaJB...44..609S. doi:10.1139/b66-073.
- Schofield, W. B. (1969). "Phytogeography of Northwestern North America: Bryophytes and Vascular Plants". Madroño. 20 (3): 155–207. JSTOR 41423659.
- Schofield, W. B.; Crum, H. A. (1972). "Disjunctions in Bryophytes". Annals of the Missouri Botanical Garden. 59 (2): 174–202. Bibcode:1972AnMBG..59..174S. doi:10.2307/2394752. JSTOR 2394752.
- Schofield, W. B. (1981). "Ecological Significance of Morphological Characters in the Moss Gametophyte". The Bryologist. 84 (2): 149–165. doi:10.2307/3242819. JSTOR 3242819.
- Asakawa, Yoshinori; Matsuda, Reiko; Schofield, W.B.; Rob Gradstein, S. (1982). "Cuparane- and isocuparane-type sesquiterpenoids in liverworts of the genus Herbertus". Phytochemistry. 21 (10): 2471–2473. Bibcode:1982PChem..21.2471A. doi:10.1016/0031-9422(82)85243-6.
- Schofield, W. B. (1988). "Bryogeography and the bryophytic characterization of biogeoclimatic zones of British Columbia, Canada". Canadian Journal of Botany. 66 (12): 2673–2686. Bibcode:1988CaJB...66.2673S. doi:10.1139/b88-362.
- Ando, Hisatsugu; Seki, Tarow; Schofield, Wilfred B. (1989). "Generic Distinctness of Brotherella from Pylaisiadelpha (Musci)". The Bryologist. 92 (2): 209–215. doi:10.2307/3243947. JSTOR 3243947.
- Tan, BC; Ramsey, HP; Schofield, WB (1996). "A contribution to Australian Sematophyllaceae (Bryopsida)". Australian Systematic Botany. 9 (3): 319. Bibcode:1996AuSyB...9..319T. doi:10.1071/SB9960319.
- Talbot, Stephen S.; Talbot, Sandra Looman; Thomson, John W.; Schofield, Wilfred B. (1997). "Lichens of Adak Island, Central Aleutian Islands, Alaska". The Bryologist. 100 (2): 241–250. doi:10.1639/0007-2745(1997)100[241:LOAICA]2.0.CO;2. JSTOR 3244058.
- Talbot, Stephen S.; Talbot, Sandra Looman; Thomson, John W.; Schofield, Wilfred B. (2001). "Lichens from St. Matthew and St. Paul Islands, Bering Sea, Alaska". The Bryologist. 104: 47. doi:10.1639/0007-2745(2001)104[0047:LFSMAS]2.0.CO;2. ISSN 0007-2745. S2CID 85942002.
- Ramsay, H. P.; Schofield, W. B.; Tan, B. C. (2002). "The family Sematophyllaceae (Bryopsida) in Australia. Part 1: Introduction, family data, key to genera and the genera Wijkia, Acanthorrynchium, Trismegistia and Sematophyllum". The Journal of the Hattori Botanical Laboratory. 92: 1–50. doi:10.18968/jhbl.92.0_1.
- Ramsay, H. P.; Schofield, W. B.; Tan, B. C. (2004). "The family Sematophyllaceae (Bryopsida) in Australia, Part 2. Acroporium, Clastobryum, Macrohymenium, Meiotheciella, Meiothecium, Papillidiopsis, Radulina, Rhaphidorrhynchium, Trichosteleum, and Warburgiella". The Journal of the Hattori Botanical Laboratory. 95: 1–69. doi:10.18968/jhbl.95.0_1. 2004
- Garbary, David J.; Miller, Anthony G.; Scrosati, Ricardo; Kim, Kwang-Young; Schofield, Wilfred B. (2008). "Distribution and salinity tolerance of intertidal mosses from Nova Scotian salt marshes". The Bryologist. 111 (2): 282. doi:10.1639/0007-2745(2008)111[282:DASTOI]2.0.CO;2. ISSN 0007-2745. S2CID 86330252.
- Talbot, Stephen S.; Schofield, Wilfred B.; Talbot, Sandra L.; Daniëls, Fred J.A. (2010). "Vegetation of eastern Unalaska Island, Aleutian Islands, Alaska. This paper is one of a selection of papers published as part of the special Schofield Gedenkschrift". Botany. 88 (4): 366–388. doi:10.1139/B09-113.

=== Books ===
- Schofield, W. B. (1992). Some Common Mosses of British Columbia (2nd ed.). Royal British Columbia Museum. ISBN 9780771891656. (1st edition, 1969)
- Schofield, W. B. (2001). Introduction to Bryology. Blackburn Press. ISBN 9781930665262.
- Schofield, W. B. (2002). Field Guide to Liverwort Genera of Pacific North America. Global Forest Society. ISBN 9780295981949.
