= Chaetomitrium elegans =

Scientific classification
- Kingdom: Plantae
- Division: Bryophyta
- Class: Bryopsida
- Subclass: Bryidae
- Order: Hypnales
- Family: Symphyodontaceae
- Genus: Chaetomitrium
- Species: C. elegans

Binomial name
- Chaetomitrium elegans Geheeb, 1889

Species of moss

Chaetomitrium elegans is a species of mosses in the genus Chaetomitrium and family Symphyodontaceae.
