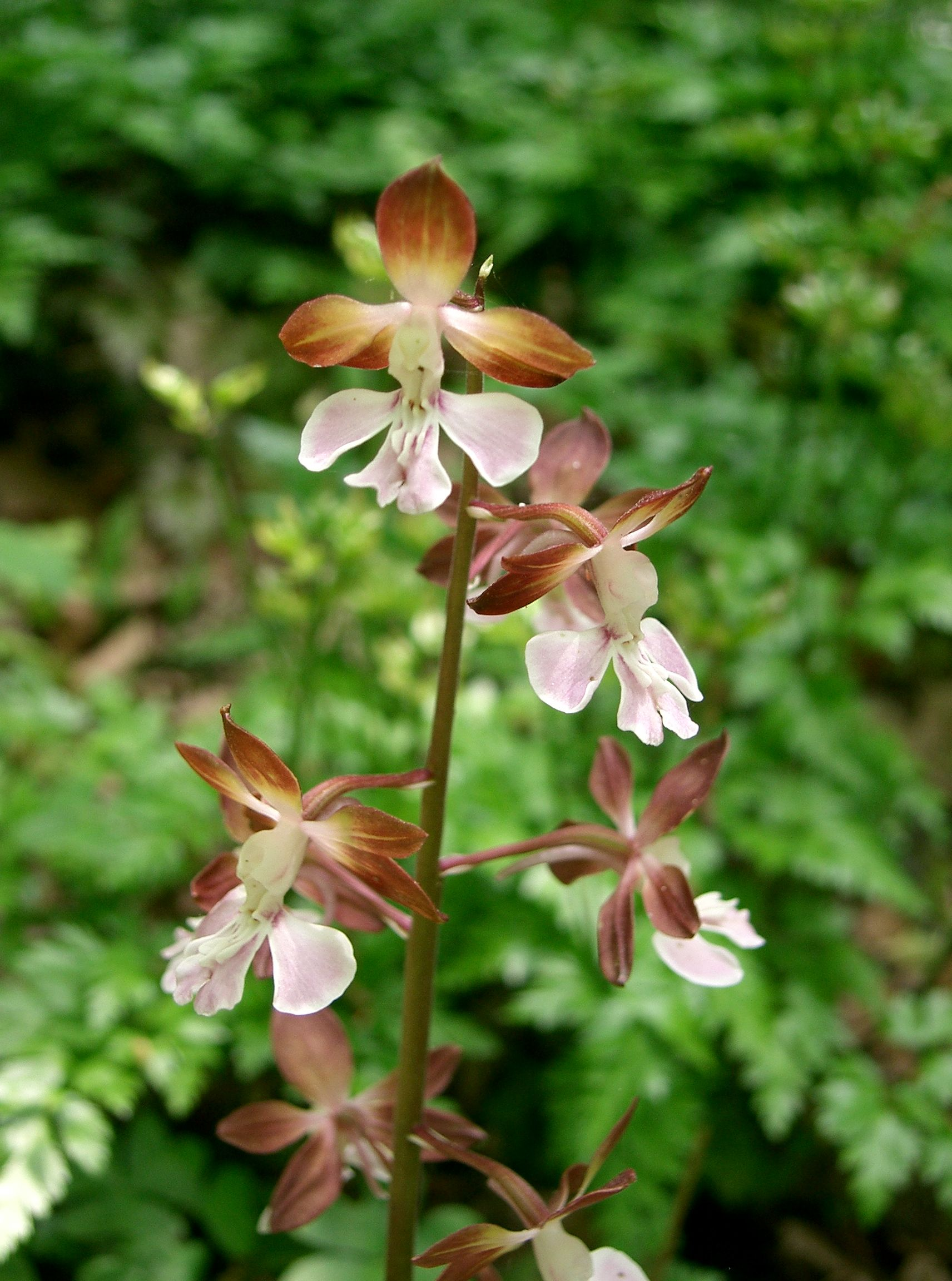

Scientific classification
- Kingdom: Plantae
- Clade: Tracheophytes
- Clade: Angiosperms
- Clade: Monocots
- Order: Asparagales
- Family: Orchidaceae
- Subfamily: Epidendroideae
- Genus: Calanthe
- Species: C. discolor

Binomial name
- Calanthe discolor Lindl. (1838)

Synonyms
- Calanthe striata var. discolor (Lindl.) Maxim (1873); Alismorkis discolor (Lindl.) Kuntze (1891); Calanthe discolor var. kanashiroi Fukuy.; Calanthe discolor f. quinquelamellata M.Hiroe (1971); Calanthe discolor f. kanashiroi (Fukuy.) K.Nakaj. (1972); Calanthe variegata Scheidw.; Calanthe lurida Decne.; Calanthe discolor var. viridialba Maxim.; Calanthe esquirolii Schltr.; Calanthe tyoh-harae Makino; Calanthe cheniana Hand.-Mazz.; Calanthe amamiana var. latilabellata Ida; Calanthe discolor var. divaricatipetala Ida; Calanthe tokunoshimensis Hatus. & Ida; Calanthe tokunoshimensis f. latilabella (Ida) Hatus.

= Calanthe discolor =

Species of orchid

Calanthe discolor is a species of orchid. It is native to Japan (including Nansei-shoto), and China (Anhui, Fujian, Guangdong, Guizhou, Hubei, Hunan, Jiangsu, Jiangxi, Zhejiang), Korea. Its vernacular name in Japanese, ebine, (海老根) means "shrimp-root" in reference to the shape of the plant's pseudobulbs and root system.

== Varieties ==
Two varieties are currently accepted (May 2014):

- Calanthe discolor var. amamiana (Fukuy.) Masam. – Nansei-shoto
- Calanthe discolor var. discolor – China, Japan (including Nansei-shoto), korea

== Description ==
The plant's bulb is roughly 2cm in length and diameter, with old bulbs persisting near the surface for over a decade. Its Japanese name comes from its shrimp-like bulb appearance. In autumn, new shoots emerge, growing slightly before overwintering. The plant typically has 2-3 thin leaves with varying shapes, featuring five longitudinal veins and a slender leaf stalk. During winter dormancy, the plant remains intact for several years.

In spring, it blooms with a 30-40cm flower stalk and 2-3 bracts, bearing numerous flowers above the midpoint. The flowers open horizontally, with distinct features on the labellum. The flowering period is from April to May.

== Usage ==
Ebine plants in Reisenzan, Japan, are popular for pot cultivation and garden planting. However, they are prone to virus infections, leading to leaf necrosis and flower deformation. Managing these infections is challenging and often requires incineration of affected plants.

The "Ebine Boom" of the 1970s and 1980s declined due to widespread viral infections, prompting growers to stop cultivation. Advances in artificial propagation technology now allow for virus-free seedling production, though commercial seed production of original Ebine species remains rare. Selectively bred varieties are more accessible and affordable, reducing the demand for original Ebine species. Conservation efforts are underway to protect wild Ebine species.

Research suggests that stem cell extracts from Calanthe discolor can stimulate growth factors and enhance tissue protein synthesis such as collagen and elastin.

== Gallery ==
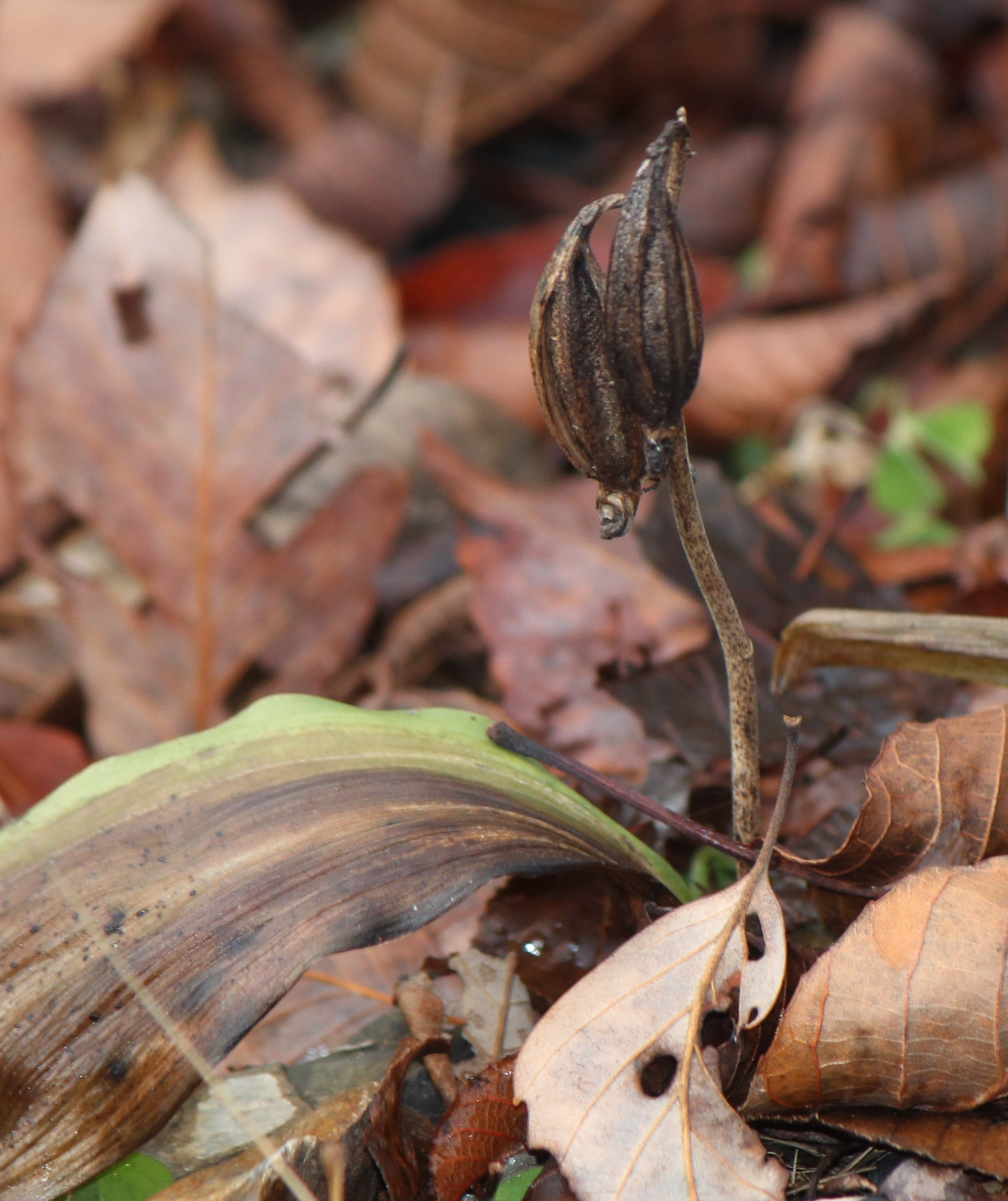

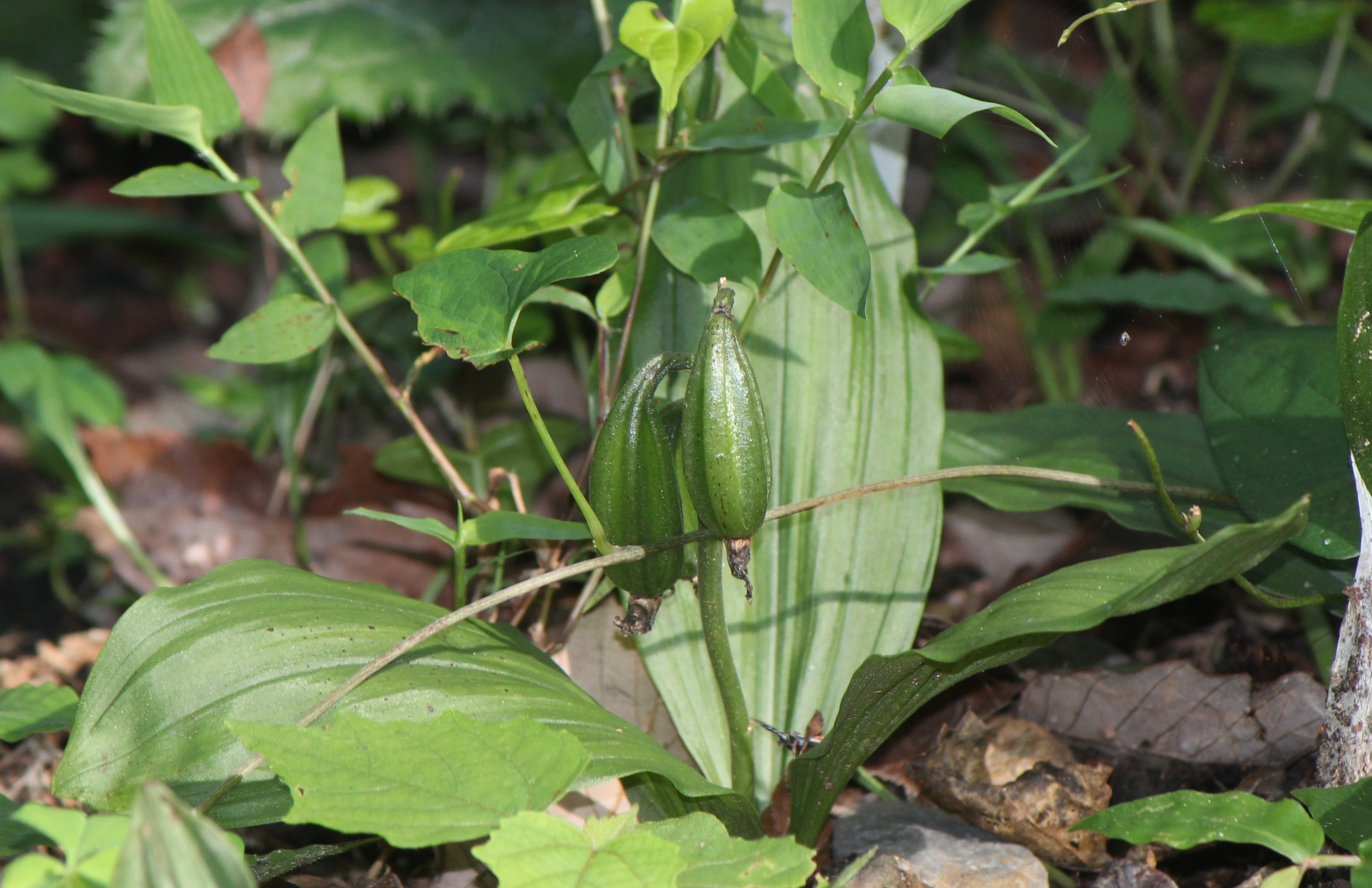

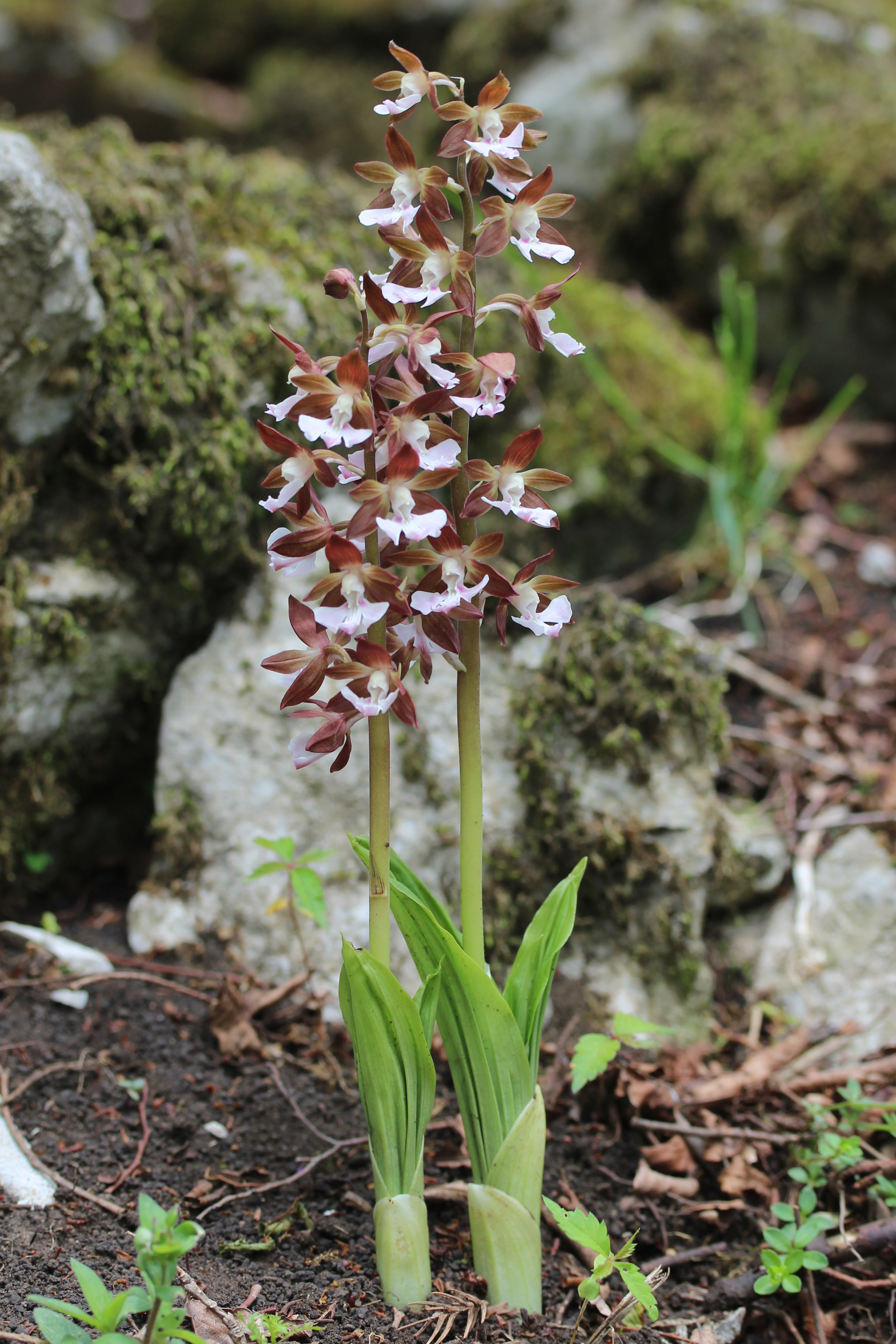

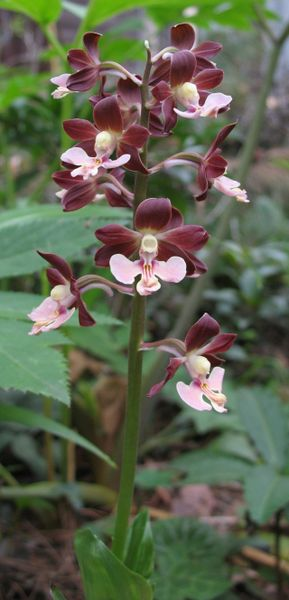
