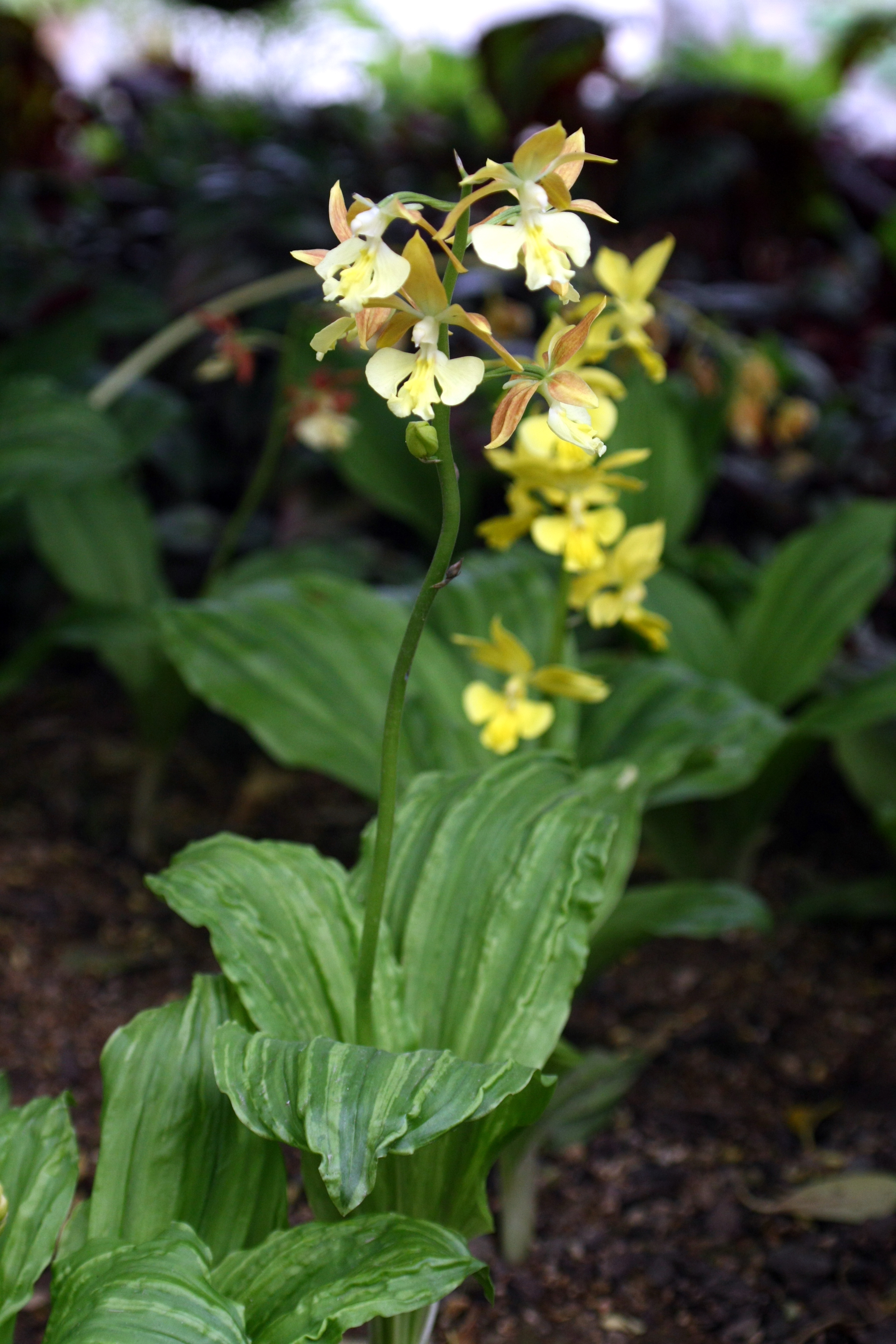

Scientific classification
- Kingdom: Plantae
- Clade: Tracheophytes
- Clade: Angiosperms
- Clade: Monocots
- Order: Asparagales
- Family: Orchidaceae
- Subfamily: Epidendroideae
- Genus: Calanthe
- Species: C. striata

Binomial name
- Calanthe striata R.Br. ex Lindl. (1833)

Synonyms
- Limodorum striatum Banks (1791) (Basionym); Limodorum striatum Sw. (1799), illegitimate homonym; Calanthe bicolor Lindl. (1838); Calanthe citrina Scheidw. (1838); Calanthe sieboldii Decne. ex Regel (1868); Calanthe discolor var. sieboldii (Decne. ex Regel) Maxim. (1872); Calanthe striata var. bicolor (Lindl.) Maxim. (1873); Calanthe striata var. sieboldii (Decne. ex Regel) Maxim. (1873); Spathoglottis unguiculata Benth. & Hook.f. (1883); Calanthe biloba var. treutleri Hook.f. (1890); Calanthe discolor var. flava Yatabe (1899); Calanthe striata var. unilamellata Finet (1900); Calanthe kawakamii Hayata (1911); Calanthe discolor var. bicolor (Lindl.) Makino (1940); Calanthe discolor f. sieboldii (Decne. ex Regel) Ohwi (1953); Calanthe striata f. sieboldii (Decne. ex Regel) Ohwi (1953); Calanthe discolor f. bicolor (Lindl.) M.Hiroe (1971)

= Calanthe striata =

Species of orchid

Calanthe striata is a species of orchid. It is native to Korea, Japan (including the Ryukyu Islands) and China (Hainan and Taiwan).
