= Calanthe hirsuta =

Scientific classification
- Kingdom: Plantae
- Clade: Tracheophytes
- Clade: Angiosperms
- Clade: Monocots
- Order: Asparagales
- Family: Orchidaceae
- Subfamily: Epidendroideae
- Genus: Calanthe
- Species: C. hirsuta

Binomial name
- Calanthe hirsuta Seidenf.

Species of plant

Calanthe hirsuta is a species of orchid.

== Taxonomy and naming ==
Calanthe hirsuta is an orchid species first formally described by botanist Gunnar Seidenfaden in 1975 belonging to the section Preptanthe. The specific epithet, hirsuta, is derived from the Latin word for "hairy" or "hirsute", a reference to the distinctive long pubescence found on its floral bracts and the reverse of its petals and sepals.

The original type specimen was collected in Thailand's Nakhon Ratchasima Province in 1930.

== Description and growth ==
This is a deciduous terrestrial herb, typically growing to a height of 38-83 cm. The plant has prominent ovoid-conical pseudobulbs, about 5 x 3 cm, which are covered by grayish, silvery sheaths. The leaves are not present during flowering. The inflorescence is softly pubescent and can be up to 55 cm long. The flowers, up to 30 mm across, are a light rose color with darker dots on the lip. Sepals are 14-21 mm long and pubescent on the outside, while petals are 13.5-18 mm long and glabrous. The lip is 3-lobed and has a cylindrical spur that is typically 27-35 mm long.

This species is very similar to Calanthe cardioglossa but can be distinguished by its much longer floral bracts, a longer spur, and a lip that is apically emarginate and lacks the prominent keels seen in C. cardioglossa.

== Habitat and distribution ==
Calanthe hirsuta is very rare and is currently considered endemic to Thailand. Collections have been made in the Eastern and Central regions, including Chaiyaphum and Nakhon Nayok. The habitat is not definitively known, but collections have come from altitudes between 1300 and 2000 meters.

The plant flowers between December and January.
