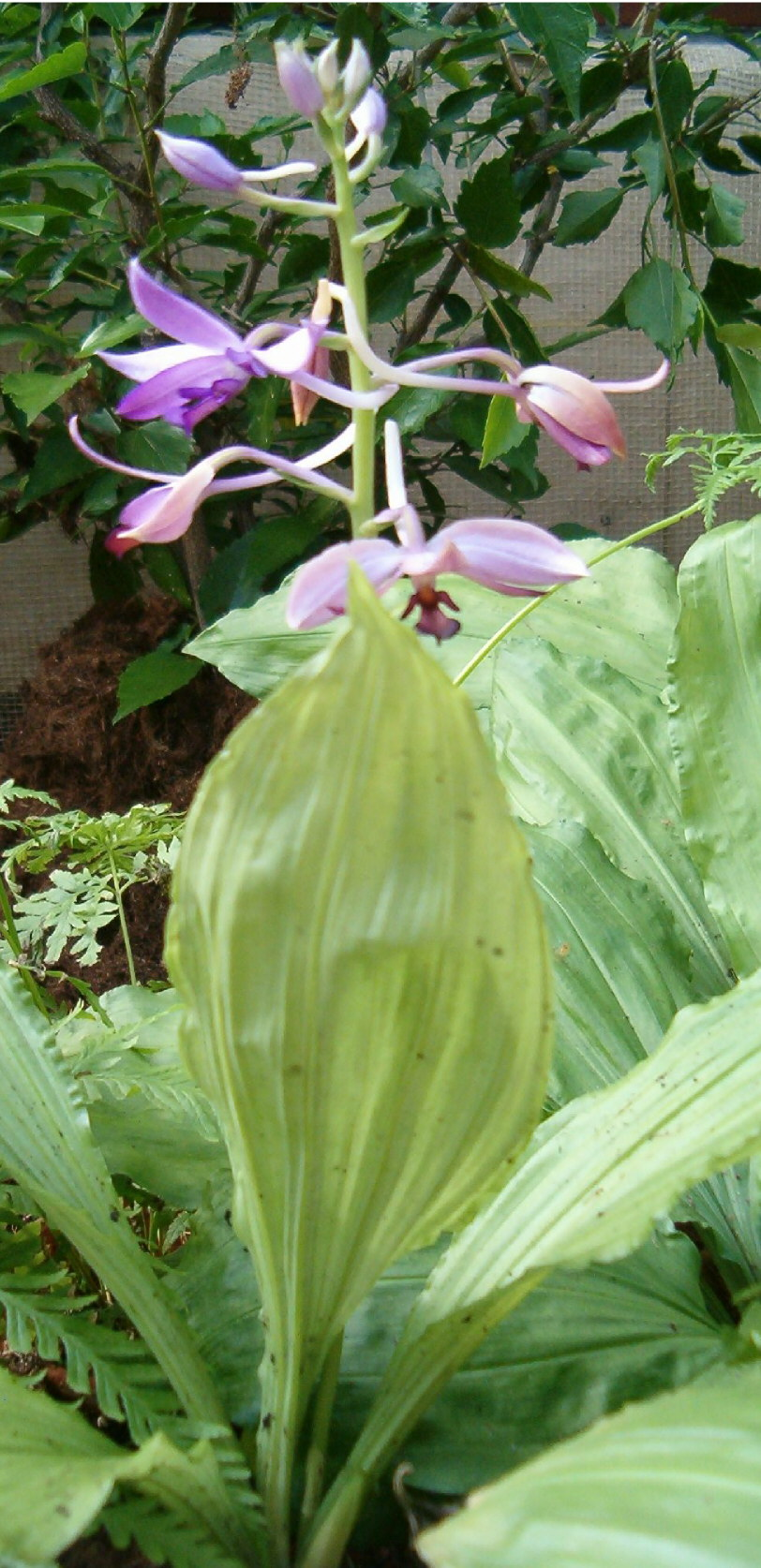

Scientific classification
- Kingdom: Plantae
- Clade: Tracheophytes
- Clade: Angiosperms
- Clade: Monocots
- Order: Asparagales
- Family: Orchidaceae
- Subfamily: Epidendroideae
- Genus: Calanthe
- Species: C. sylvatica

Binomial name
- Calanthe sylvatica (Thouars) Lindl. (1833)

Synonyms
- Centrosis sylvatica Thouars (1822) (Basionym); Alismorkis centrosis (Thouars) Steud. (1840); Alismorkis natalensis (Rchb.f.) Kuntze (1891); Alismorkis plantaginea (Thouars) Kuntze (1891); Bletia sylvatica (Thouars) Bojer (1837); Calanthe candida Bosser (1989); Calanthe corymbosa (Thouars) Lindl. (1862); Calanthe curtisii Rchb.f. (1884); Calanthe delphinioides Kraenzl. (1893); Calanthe humbertii H.Perrier (1955); Calanthe natalensis (Rchb.f.) Rchb.f. (1856); Calanthe neglecta Schltr. (1915); Calanthe sanderiana Rolfe (1892); Calanthe schliebenii Mansf. (1933); Calanthe stolzii Schltr. (1915); Calanthe sylvatica var. geerinckiana Stévart (2000); Calanthe sylvatica var. natalensis Rchb.f. (1846); Calanthe sylvatica var. pallidipetala Schltr. (1924); Calanthe sylvestris Lindl. ex Steud. (1840); Calanthe volkensii Rolfe (1897); Centrosia aubertii A. Rich. (1828); Centrosis corymbosa Thouars (1822); Centrosis plantaginea Thouars (1822)

= Calanthe sylvatica =

Species of orchid

Calanthe sylvatica is a species of orchid. It is native to tropical and southern Africa from Sierra Leone to Tanzania to South Africa, as well as Madagascar, Comoros, Mauritius and Réunion.
