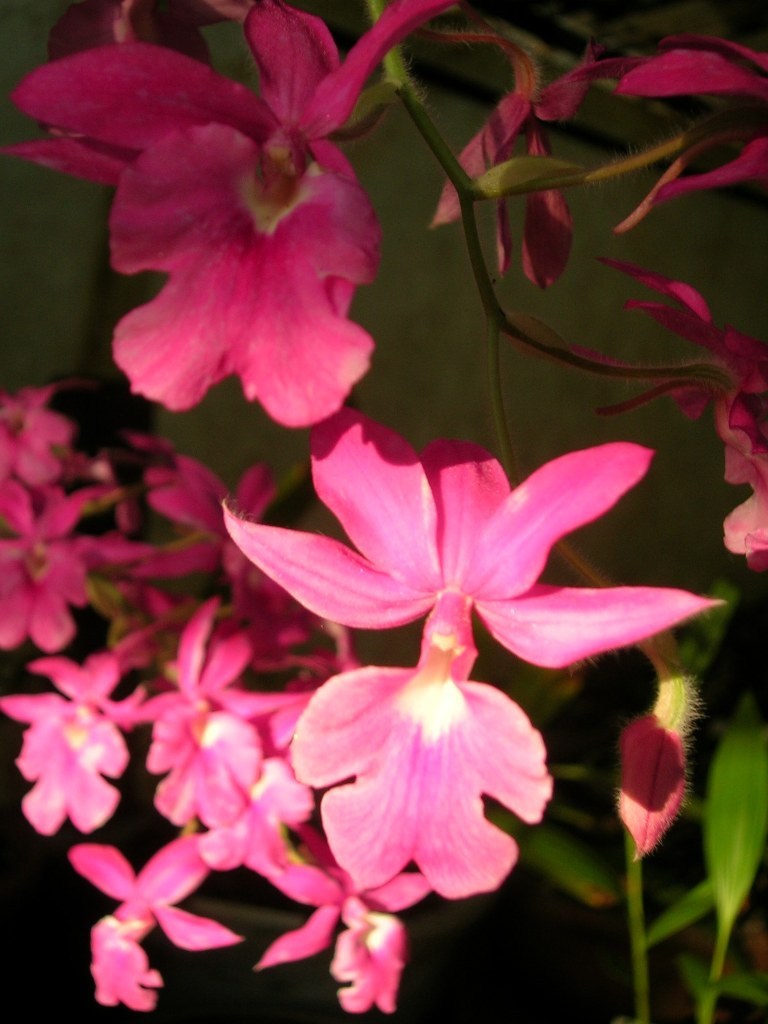

Scientific classification
- Kingdom: Plantae
- Clade: Tracheophytes
- Clade: Angiosperms
- Clade: Monocots
- Order: Asparagales
- Family: Orchidaceae
- Subfamily: Epidendroideae
- Genus: Calanthe
- Species: C. rubens

Binomial name
- Calanthe rubens Ridl. (1890)

Synonyms
- Coelogyne rubens Ridl. (1890); Alismorkis rubens (Ridl.) Kuntze (1891); Calanthe elmeri Ames (1908); Preptanthe rubens (Ridl.) Ridl. (1924); Calanthe vestita var. fournieri Rolfe; Calanthe elmeri Ames

= Calanthe rubens =

Species of orchid

Calanthe rubens is a species of orchid. It is native to the Philippines, Thailand and Malaysia and generally grows at elevations above 300 feet. It is warm growing and deciduous, commencing growth in spring and flowering in autumn.
