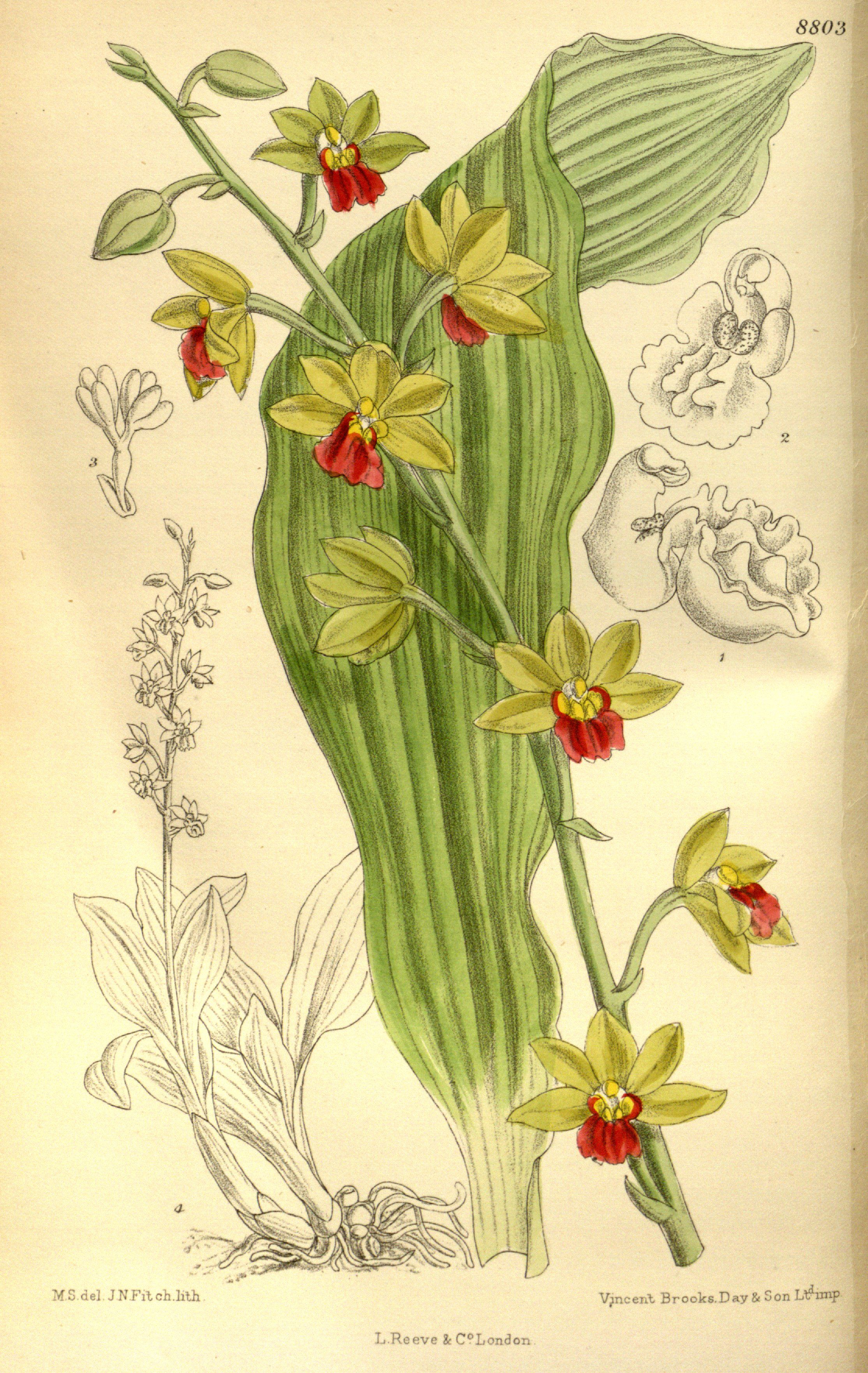
- Illustration by Matilda Smith, published in Curtis's Botanical Magazine, 1919

Scientific classification
- Kingdom: Plantae
- Clade: Tracheophytes
- Clade: Angiosperms
- Clade: Monocots
- Order: Asparagales
- Family: Orchidaceae
- Subfamily: Epidendroideae
- Genus: Calanthe
- Species: C. tricarinata

Binomial name
- Calanthe tricarinata Lindl

Synonyms
- List: Alismorchis tricarinata (Lindl.) Kuntze; Alismorkis tricarinata (Lindl.) Kuntze; Calanthe brevicornu var. megalophora (Franch.) Finet; Calanthe lamellata Hayata; Calanthe megalopha Franch.; Calanthe megalophora Franch.; Calanthe occidentalis Lindl.; Calanthe pantlingii Schltr.; Calanthe torifera Schltr.; Calanthe undulata Schltr. nom. illeg.; Paracalanthe lamellata (Hayata) Kudô; Paracalanthe megalophora (Franch.) Miyabe & Kudô; Paracalanthe torifera (Schltr.) Kudô; Paracalanthe tricarinata (Lindl.) Kudô

= Calanthe tricarinata =

Species of plant

Calanthe tricarinata is a species of orchid native to Japan (including the Ryukyu Islands), Korea, China (Gansu, Guizhou, Hubei, Shaanxi, Sichuan, Taiwan, Tibet, Yunnan), Northeastern India, Pakistan, Bhutan, Assam, Nepal, Kashmir, Myanmar and Thailand.
