= Verrucaria schofieldii =

Scientific classification
- Kingdom: Fungi
- Division: Ascomycota
- Class: Eurotiomycetes
- Order: Verrucariales
- Family: Verrucariaceae
- Genus: Verrucaria
- Species: V. schofieldii

Binomial name
- Verrucaria schofieldii Brodo (1997)

Species of lichen-forming fungus

Verrucaria schofieldii is a species of crustose lichen in the family Verrucariaceae. It was described in 1997 by Irwin M. Brodo and named in honour of the bryologist Wilfred Schofield. The lichen forms a thin, dark olive crust on coastal rock and is characteristic of the salt-spray zone on Pacific shorelines. It is known from Haida Gwaii and south-eastern Alaska and is regarded as a North American endemic.

== Taxonomy ==
Verrucaria schofieldii was described as new to science by Irwin M. Brodo in 1997 in a paper on the marine Verrucaria species of the Queen Charlotte Islands (Haida Gwaii), which also introduced V. epimaura. The holotype was collected on 28 June 1967 at Henslung Harbour, Langara Island, on siliceous shoreline rock in the upper hygrohaline (sea spray zone) zone. The specimen (Brodo 10636, with W.B. Schofield) is housed at the Canadian Museum of Nature (CANL).

The species epithet honours the bryologist Wilfred Borden Schofield, who encouraged Brodo's work on the islands and joined him at the type locality. In Brodo and Santesson's key it resolves as a rather common taxon with perithecia that are partially immersed and form distinct bumps on the thallus, and with ellipsoid spores mostly 11.5–16 × 6–8 μm. The authors contrasted it with superficially similar maritime species: Wahlenbergiella mucosa (entirely immersed perithecia and smaller spores), V. erichsenii (superficial perithecia and smaller spores), and Hydropunctaria maura (broader, truncate spores, black basal medullary layer, and a more rimose to areolate thallus).

== Description ==
Verrucaria schofieldii forms a thin, continuous crust (the thallus—the lichen body) that is usually 0.04–0.12 mm thick. The margin is indistinct to sharp but does not form lobes. The surface is smooth and shiny, sometimes showing fine cracks where the thallus is a little thicker. It is dark olive to grey-olive and becomes jelly-like when wet. Black carbonised dots or short lines on the surface (called jugae) are absent or scarce and very small—smaller than in Hydropuncataria maura. There is no black basal layer; at most a thin brown film may occur where the thallus meets the rock. Dried specimens often turn permanently black after being moistened with fresh water. Soredia and a prothallus are both absent, and the green-algal partner (photobiont) has rounded cells about 7–9 μm across that are not arranged in columns.

The fruiting bodies (perithecia—flask-shaped structures with a tiny pore, the ostiole) occur singly or in small groups. They are black, partly to wholly covered by the thallus, yet still produce a distinct bump; typically one-half to three-quarters of each perithecium remains visible. Mature perithecia are conical and 0.25–0.45 mm in diameter, with the ostiole level with the surface. The outer carbonised jacket (involucrellum) is thick and may extend outward as a collar into the thallus; it completely surrounds the colourless centre (centrum). The inner wall (excipulum) is 20–25 μm thick and may be carbonised like the involucrellum or merely darkly pigmented. The centrum itself measures about 170–200 μm high by 170–200 μm wide. The tissue beneath the spore-bearing layer (hypothecium) is colourless, and there are conspicuous stiff "hairs" (periphyses) around the ostiole.

Ascospores are produced eight per ascus. They are hyaline (colourless), ellipsoid, and small, measuring 11.5–16 × 6.5–8 μm with a length-to-width ratio of about 1.7–2.1. Asexual propagules are frequent: pycnidia are commonly embedded in the thallus and yield short rod-shaped conidia (asexual spores) measuring 4–8 × 0.9–1.1 μm.

== Habitat and distribution ==
On sun-exposed Pacific shorelines, Verrucaria schofieldii grows directly on coastal rock, mostly silica-rich stone, and only rarely on limestone. It occupies the hygrohaline belt, the salt-spray zone that stays damp but is usually above the level of regular submersion; it is most often found in the lower part of that belt and less frequently higher up.

Within Haida Gwaii (Queen Charlotte Islands) the species is scattered along most rocky coasts, and its range continues north into south-eastern Alaska; it is regarded as a North American endemic. Documented sites include many islands across the archipelago (e.g., Chaatl Island, Hibben, Kunghit, Louise, Moresby, and others) and the Juneau area in Alaska. It was also recorded from Calvert Island in a 2018 BioBlitz.

In a transect study of maritime lichens in Gwaii Haanas, Verrucaria schofieldii was among the more frequently encountered shoreline species and was one of the black Verrucaria lichens contributing to the conspicuous black band near the upper edge of the intertidal zone. In that study it was characteristic of the upper littoral fringe on coastal rocks, above the Fucus-barnacle zone. Brodo and Sloan also found that, unlike some maritime lichens with clearer substrate preferences, V. schofieldii appeared indifferent to rock chemistry, occurring on both calcareous and siliceous shore rocks.

== See also ==
- List of Verrucaria species
