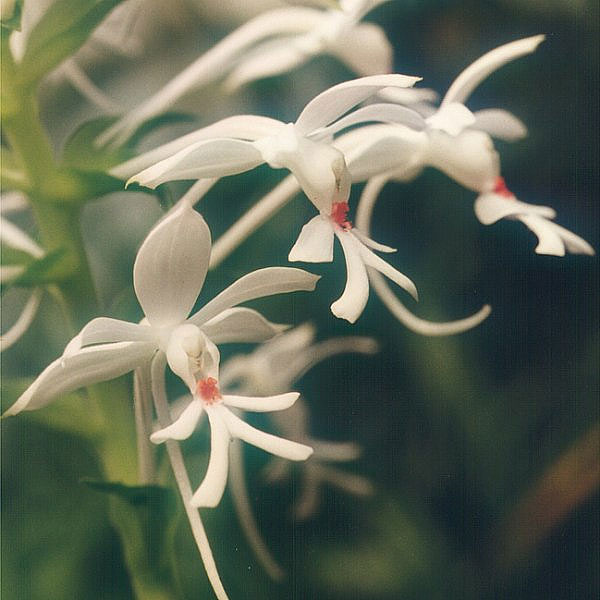

Scientific classification
- Kingdom: Plantae
- Clade: Tracheophytes
- Clade: Angiosperms
- Clade: Monocots
- Order: Asparagales
- Family: Orchidaceae
- Subfamily: Epidendroideae
- Genus: Calanthe
- Species: C. triplicata

Binomial name
- Calanthe triplicata (Willemet) Ames

Synonyms
- List of synonyms: Orchis triplicata Willemet (1796); Alismorkis angraeciflora (Rchb.f.) Kuntze (1891); Alismorkis diploxiphion (Hook.f.) Kuntze (1891); Alismorkis furcata (Bateman ex Lindl.) Kuntze (1891); Alismorkis gracillima (Lindl.) Kuntze (1891); Alismorkis veratrifolia (Willd.) Kuntze (1891); Amblyglottis veratrifolia (Willd.) Blume (1825); Bletia quadrifida Hook.f. (1890); Calanthe angraeciflora Rchb.f. (1876); Calanthe australasica D.L.Jones & M.A.Clem. (2006); Calanthe bracteosa Rchb.f. (1882); Calanthe brevicolumna Hayata (1911); Calanthe catilligera Rchb.f. (1857); Calanthe celebica Rolfe (1899); Calanthe comosa Rchb.f. (1846); Calanthe diploxiphion Hook.f. (1890); Calanthe furcata Bateman ex Lindl. (1838); Calanthe furcata f. albolineata K. Nakaj. (1969); Calanthe furcata f. albomarginata K. Nakaj. (1969); Calanthe furcata f. brevicolumna (Hayata) M. Hiroe (1971); Calanthe gracillima Lindl. (1855); Calanthe matsumurana Schltr. (1906); Calanthe millotae Ursch & Genoud ex Bosser (1966); Calanthe nephroglossa Schltr. (1911); Calanthe orthocentron Schltr. (1912); Calanthe perrottetii A. Rich. (1841); Calanthe proboscidea Rchb.f. (1884); Calanthe pubescens Ridl. (1923); Calanthe rubicallosa Masam. (1975); Calanthe triplicata f. albolineata (K. Nakaj.) Hatus. (1971); Calanthe triplicata f. albomarginata (K. Nakaj.) K. Nakaj. (1973); Calanthe triplicata var. angraeciflora (Rchb.f.) N. Hallé (1977); Calanthe triplicata var. gracillima (Lindl.) N. Hallé (1998); Calanthe triplicata var. minahassae Schltr. (1925); Calanthe veratrifolia (Willd.) R.Br. ex Ker Gawl. (1823); Calanthe veratrifolia var. australis Linden (1851); Calanthe veratrifolia var. dupliciloba J.J. Sm. (1922); Calanthe veratrifolia var. kennyi F.M. Bailey (1912); Calanthe veratrifolia var. lancipetala J.J. Sm. (1930); Calanthe veratrifolia var. stenochila Rchb.f. (1897); Limodorum ventricosum Steud. (1821); Limodorum veratrifolium Willd. (1805)

= Calanthe triplicata =

Common Christmas orchid

Species of plant

Calanthe triplicata commonly known as the common Christmas orchid is a plant in the orchid family and is native to Oceania, Asia, Pacific islands, and the islands of eastern Africa. It is a terrestrial orchid that grows in clumps with crowded pseudobulbs, dark green corrugated leaves and up to forty white flowers. The sepals and petals are similar to each other and the labellum has three spreading lobes and a yellow callus.

== Description ==
Calanthe triplicata is a terrestrial, evergreen herb that grows in clumps and has crowded, fleshy, oval pseudobulbs 40–80 mm (2–3 in) long and 20–40 mm (0.8–2 in) wide. Each pseudobulb has between four and nine dark green, lance-shaped, corrugated leaves 250–900 mm (10–40 in) long and 60–180 mm (2–7 in) wide tapering towards the base. The leaf veins are more or less parallel with between six and nine more prominent than the rest. Between eighteen and forty white flowers 25–35 mm (0.98–1.4 in) wide are crowded near the top of an upright flowering stem 50–1,500 mm (2–60 in) long. The sepals are egg-shaped, 6–19 mm (0.2–0.7 in) long and 6–7 mm (0.2–0.3 in) wide. The petals are a similar shape, 5–15 mm (0.2–0.6 in) long and 2–6 mm (0.08–0.2 in) wide. The labellum has three widely spreading lobes 4–15 mm (0.2–0.6 in) long and 2–6 mm (0.08–0.2 in) wide with the middle lobe further divided into two. The spur behind the labellum is 10–30 mm (0.4–1 in) long and curved. Flowering occurs from October to February in Australia and in April and May in China.

== Taxonomy and naming ==
The common Christmas orchid was first formally described in 1796 by (Pierre) Remi Willemet, who gave it the name Orchis triplicata and published the description in Paul Usteri's book Annalen der Botanick. In 1907, Oakes Ames changed the name to Calanthe triplicata. The specific epithet (triplicata) is derived from the Latin prefix tris meaning "thrice" and plicatus meaning "folded".

== Distribution and habitat ==
Calanthe triplicata is found in Mauritius, Madagascar, Seychelles, Assam, eastern Himalayas, southern India, Sri Lanka, Myanmar, Thailand, Malaysia, Laos, Cambodia, south China, Vietnam, Borneo, Java, Lesser Sunda Islands, Moluccas, Philippines, Sulawesi, Sumatra, Bismark Islands, New Guinea, Solomon Islands, Australia, Fiji, New Caledonia, Samoa, Vanuatu, Wallis and Futuna, Marquesas, Santa Cruz Islands, Caroline Islands, the Marianas Islands, Taiwan, Ryukyu Islands. In Australia it occurs between the Iron Range in Queensland and the Illawarra in New South Wales as well as on Norfolk Island and Lord Howe Island. It grows in evergreen broad-leaved forests, rainforests and other wet forests in dense shade.

== Gallery ==
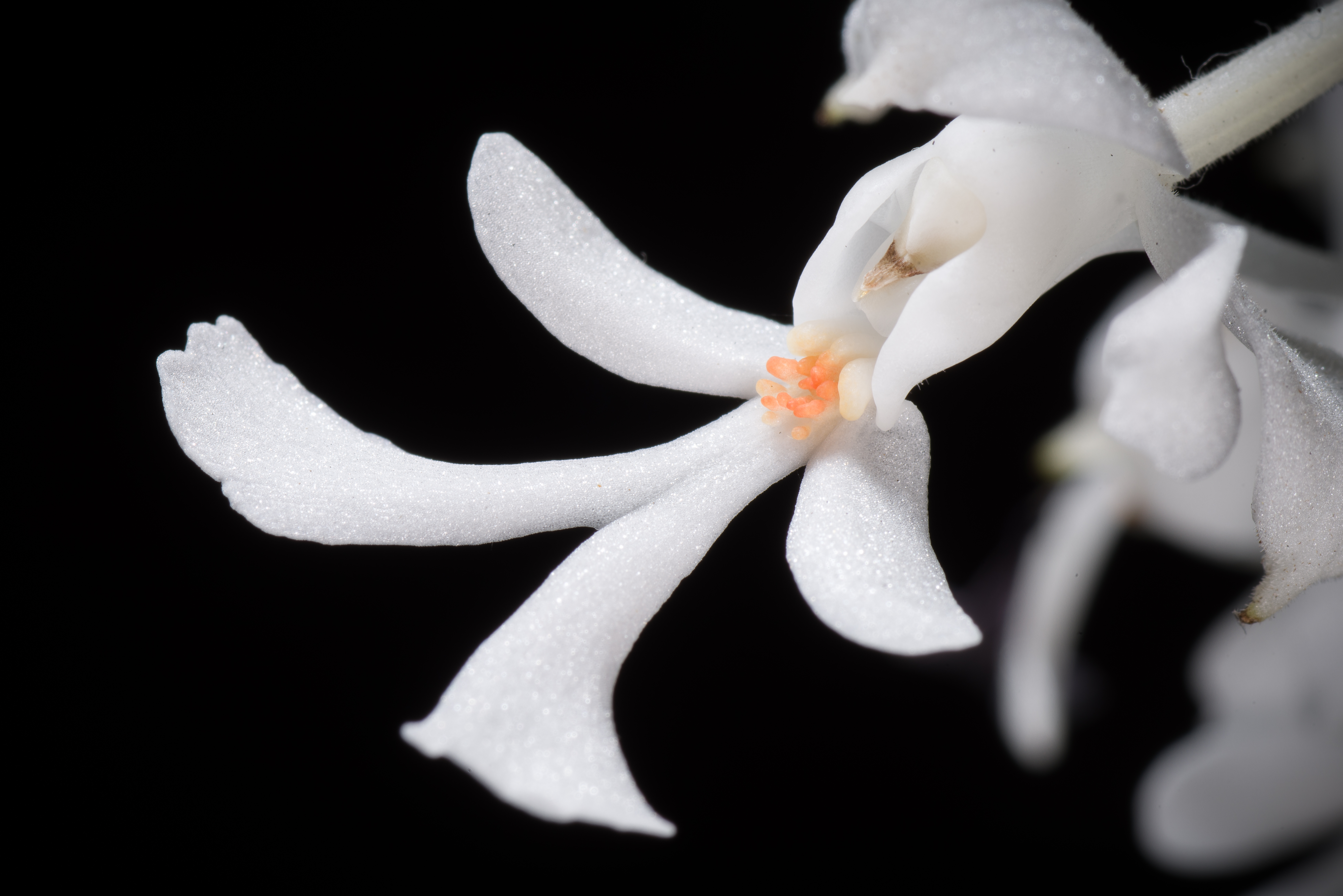
Labellum detail

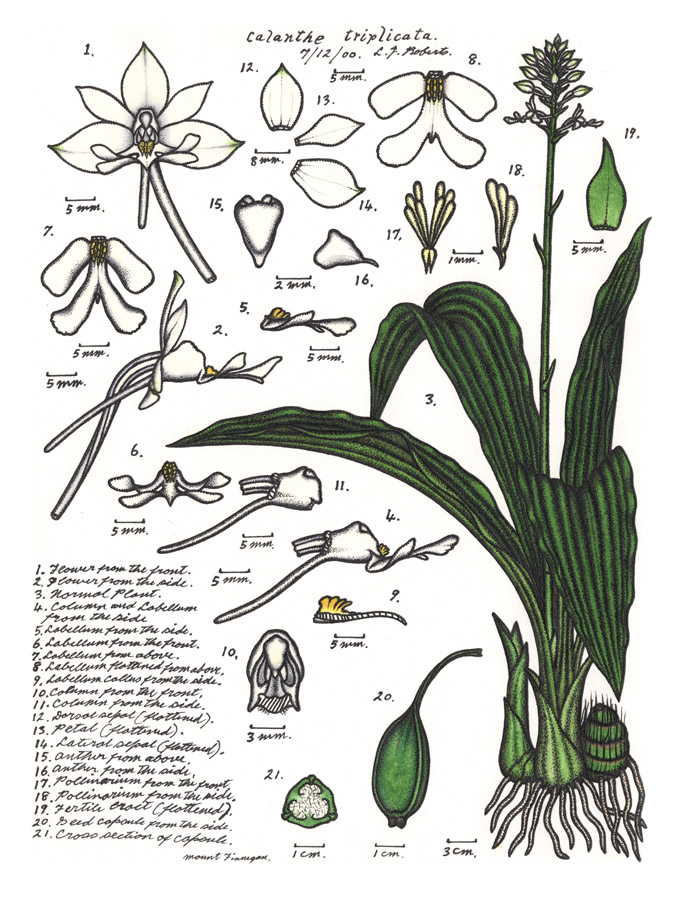
Illustration by Lewis Roberts

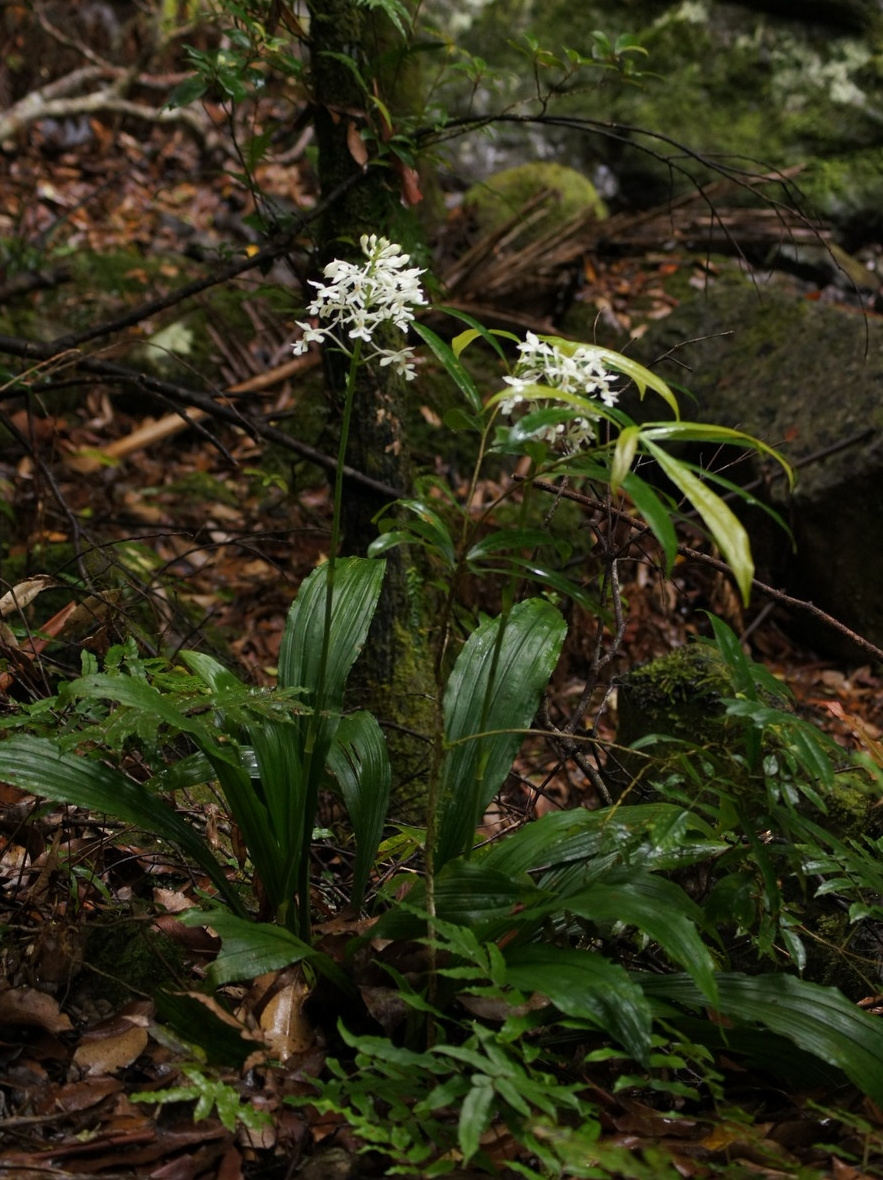
Habit near Binna Burra

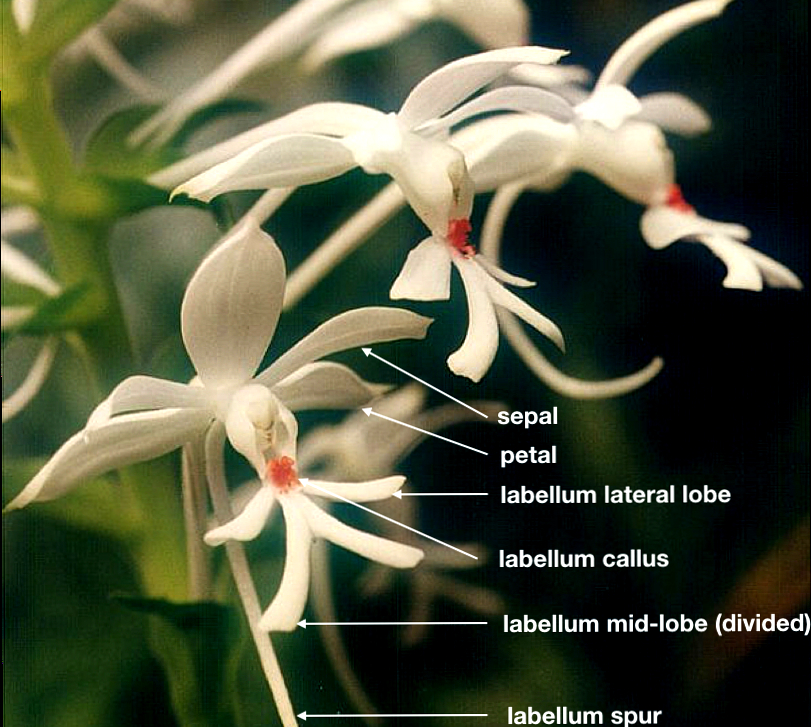
Labelled image
