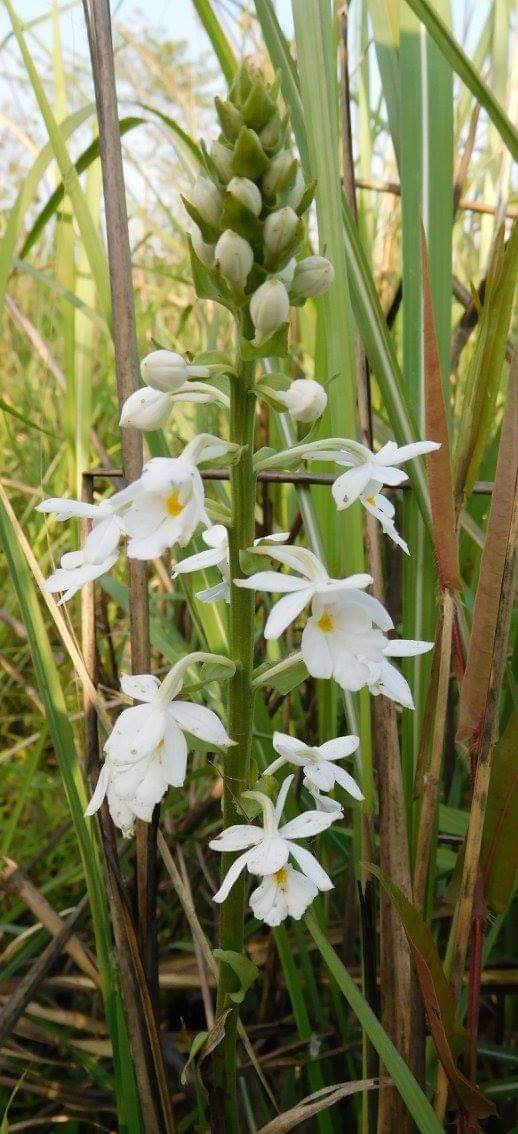

Scientific classification
- Kingdom: Plantae
- Clade: Tracheophytes
- Clade: Angiosperms
- Clade: Monocots
- Order: Asparagales
- Family: Orchidaceae
- Subfamily: Epidendroideae
- Genus: Calanthe
- Species: C. odora

Binomial name
- Calanthe odora Griff.

Synonyms
- Alismorkis angusta (Lindl.) Kuntze; Alismorkis odora (Griff.) Kuntze; Alismorkis vaginata (Lindl.) Kuntze; Calanthe angustaLindl.; Calanthe angusta var. laeta Hand.-Mazz.; Calanthe shweliensis W.W.Sm.; Calanthe vaginata Lindl.

= Calanthe odora =

Orchid species with fragrant blooms from Asia

Calanthe odora is a species of flowering plant in the family Orchidaceae. It primarily grows in soil. It is commonly referred to as Fragrant Calanthe. This orchid species is found in several countries, including Bangladesh, Bhutan, Cambodia, northeastern India, Laos, northern Thailand, and Vietnam. Additionally, it is native to Assam.

== Description ==
Calanthe odora is a species of orchid known for its unique characteristics. It typically reaches a height ranging from 25 to 50 cm. During its flowering phase, the orchid's foliage is not as developed, showcasing two or three leaves with pointed tips. The flower stalk emerges from the leafless radicle of the previous year, giving rise to delicate white flowers measuring approximately 1 to 1.4 cm in length. This particular orchid species thrives at altitudes between 700 and 1300 m above sea level.
