= Calanthe fargesii =

Conservation status
- Vulnerable (IUCN 3.1)

Scientific classification
- Kingdom: Plantae
- Clade: Tracheophytes
- Clade: Angiosperms
- Clade: Monocots
- Order: Asparagales
- Family: Orchidaceae
- Subfamily: Epidendroideae
- Genus: Calanthe
- Species: C. fargesii

Binomial name
- Calanthe fargesii Finet

Species of orchid

Calanthe fargesii is a species of plant in the family Orchidaceae. It is endemic to China (Chongqing, Gansu, Guizhou, and Sichuan provinces). Its natural habitats are subtropical or tropical moist lowland forests and subtropical or tropical moist montane forests.

The Latin specific epithet fargesii refers to the French missionary and amateur botanist Père Paul Guillaume Farges (1844–1912).
