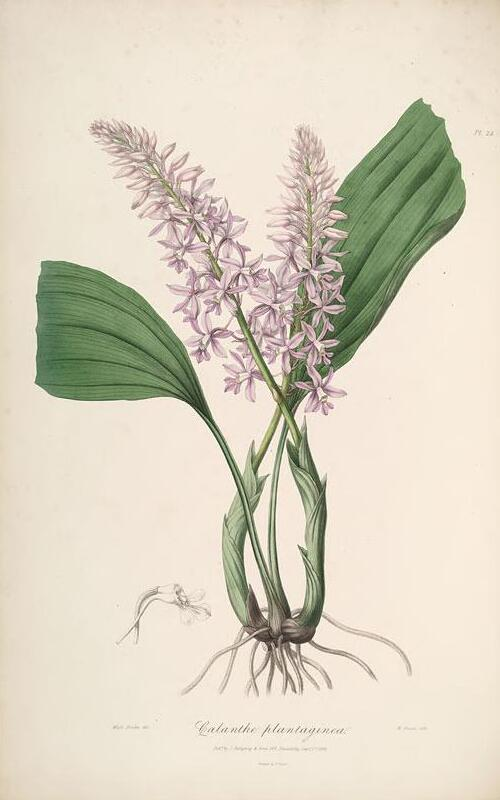
- Illustration by Matilda Smith, published in Curtis's Botanical Magazine, 1919

Conservation status
- CITES Appendix II

Scientific classification
- Kingdom: Plantae
- Clade: Tracheophytes
- Clade: Angiosperms
- Clade: Monocots
- Order: Asparagales
- Family: Orchidaceae
- Subfamily: Epidendroideae
- Genus: Calanthe
- Species: C. plantaginea

Binomial name
- Calanthe plantaginea Lindl

= Calanthe plantaginea =

Species of plant

Calanthe plantaginea, sometimes known as plantain calanthe or broad leaved calanthe, is a species of orchid in the genus Calanthe found in tropical southern sections of Asia.

== Description ==
It is an evergreen perennial herb growing around 40 to 65 cm tall. It has a pseudobulb instead of a true bulb. The leaves are long, lance shaped, being 20 to 30 cm in length. The plant has many sweet scented flowers measuring around 3 cm across and having a lilac, pink or white colour.

== Distribution ==
It is found primarily in tropical and subtropical moist broadleaf forests and does extend into temperate areas like in China. It is found in both the East and West Himalayas (Pakistan, India, Bhutan, Nepal), Myanmar, Mountains of Southwest China, Southern tips of Tibet and South Central China. They can be found in shaded tropical evergreen areas.
