= Calanthe delavayi =

Conservation status
- Vulnerable (IUCN 3.1)

Scientific classification
- Kingdom: Plantae
- Clade: Tracheophytes
- Clade: Angiosperms
- Clade: Monocots
- Order: Asparagales
- Family: Orchidaceae
- Subfamily: Epidendroideae
- Genus: Calanthe
- Species: C. delavayi

Binomial name
- Calanthe delavayi Finet

Synonyms
- Phaius delavayi (Finet) P.J.Cribb & Perner; Calanthe coelogyniformis Kraenzl.

Species of orchid

Calanthe delavayi is a species of plant in the family Orchidaceae. It is endemic to China.
