= Calanthe henryi =

Conservation status
- Vulnerable (IUCN 3.1)

Scientific classification
- Kingdom: Plantae
- Clade: Tracheophytes
- Clade: Angiosperms
- Clade: Monocots
- Order: Asparagales
- Family: Orchidaceae
- Subfamily: Epidendroideae
- Genus: Calanthe
- Species: C. henryi

Binomial name
- Calanthe henryi Rolfe

Species of orchid

Calanthe henryi is a species of plant in the family Orchidaceae. It is endemic to Sichuan and Hubei Provinces of China.
