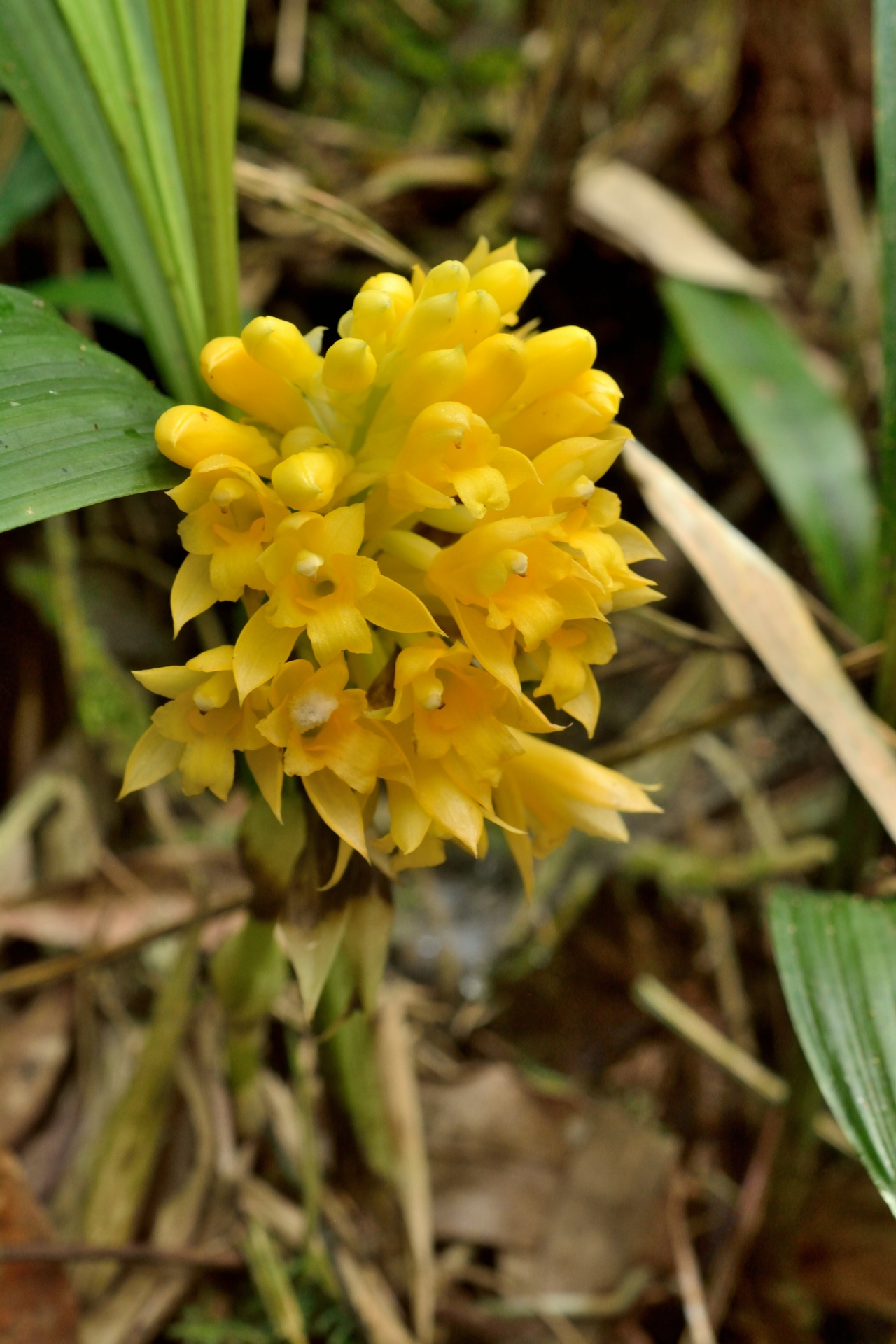
- 1833 illustration from Edwards's Botanical Register

Scientific classification
- Kingdom: Plantae
- Clade: Tracheophytes
- Clade: Angiosperms
- Clade: Monocots
- Order: Asparagales
- Family: Orchidaceae
- Subfamily: Epidendroideae
- Genus: Calanthe
- Species: C. densiflora

Binomial name
- Calanthe densiflora Lindl. (1833)

Synonyms
- Phaius epiphyticus Seidenf. (1985); Alismorkis densiflora (Lindl.) Kuntze (1891); Calanthe kazuoi Yamam. (1930)

= Calanthe densiflora =

Species of orchid

Calanthe densiflora is a species of orchid. It is native to Nepal, eastern India, Bhutan, Bangladesh, Myanmar, Thailand, Vietnam, Nansei-shoto (the Ryukyu Islands) and China (Guangdong, Guangxi, Hainan, Sichuan, Taiwan, Tibet, and Yunnan).
