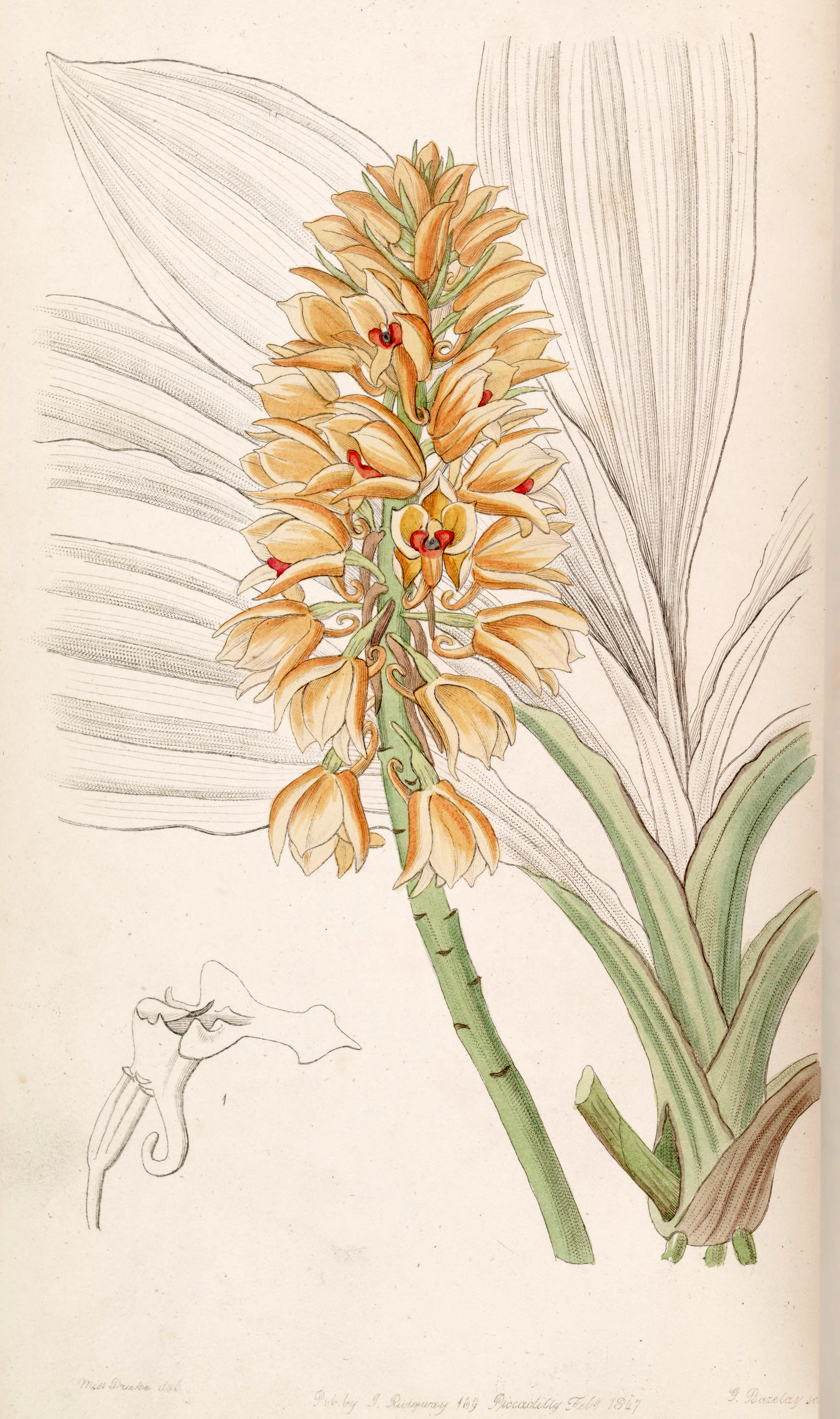
- 1847 illustration from Edwards's Botanical Register

Scientific classification
- Kingdom: Plantae
- Clade: Tracheophytes
- Clade: Angiosperms
- Clade: Monocots
- Order: Asparagales
- Family: Orchidaceae
- Subfamily: Epidendroideae
- Genus: Calanthe
- Species: C. pulchra

Binomial name
- Calanthe pulchra (Blume) Lindl. (1833)

Synonyms
- Amblyglottis pulchra Blume (1825) (Basionym); Styloglossum nervosum Breda (1827); Calanthe curculigoides Lindl. (1833); Alismorkis pulchra (Blume) Kuntze (1891); Alismorkis curculigoides (Lindl.) Kuntze (1891); Calanthe shelfordii Ridl. (1900)

= Calanthe pulchra =

Species of orchid

Calanthe pulchra is a species of orchid.

It is found in Laos, Thailand, Borneo, Java, Malaysia, the Philippines and Sumatra in humid forests at elevations of 130 to 1700 meters. It is medium to large sized, hot to warm growing terrestrial with close set, small pseudobulbs enveloped by leaf sheaths and carrying 5 to 6, elliptic, acuminate, plicate, gradually narrowing below into the elongate petiolate base leaf that blooms in the spring on a 20 to 24" [50 to 60 cm] long, erect, densely 40 to 60 flowered, racemose inflorescence with large, lanceolate, acute, very concave floral bracts that fall before the odorless flowers open

The small flower and hooked spur are diagnostic for this species.
