= Calanthe yueana =

Conservation status
- Endangered (IUCN 3.1)

Scientific classification
- Kingdom: Plantae
- Clade: Tracheophytes
- Clade: Angiosperms
- Clade: Monocots
- Order: Asparagales
- Family: Orchidaceae
- Subfamily: Epidendroideae
- Genus: Calanthe
- Species: C. yueana

Binomial name
- Calanthe yueana T.Tang & F.T.Wang

Species of orchid

Calanthe yueana is a species of plant in the family Orchidaceae. It is endemic to China, known from Hubei and Sichuan Provinces.
