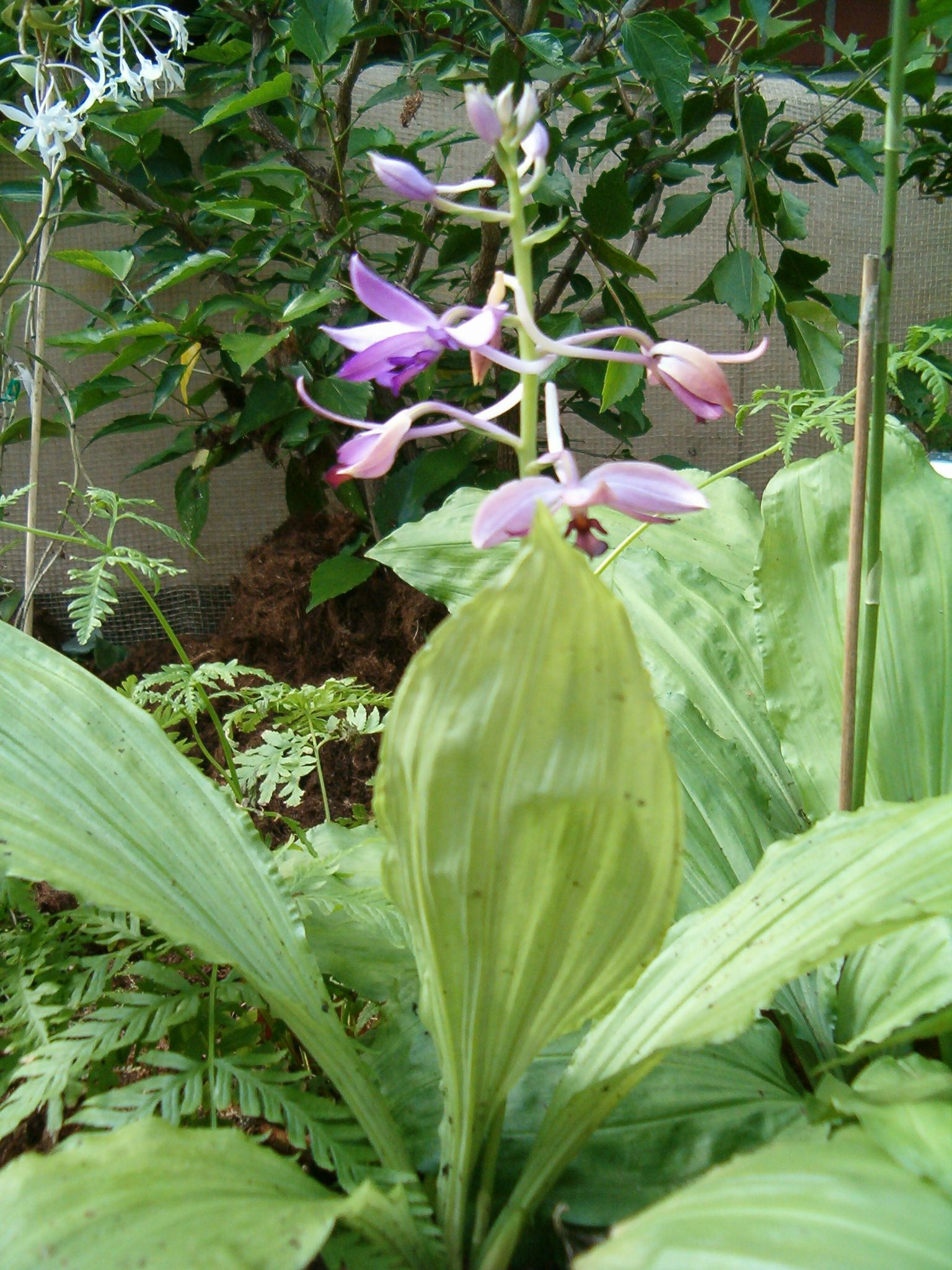
- Calanthe sylvatica in the Botanical Gardens Berlin - Orchid Exhibition

Scientific classification
- Kingdom: Plantae
- Clade: Tracheophytes
- Clade: Angiosperms
- Clade: Monocots
- Order: Asparagales
- Family: Orchidaceae
- Subfamily: Epidendroideae
- Tribe: Collabieae
- Genus: Calanthe; R.Br.

Diversity
- About 300 species

Synonyms
- List: Alismorchis Thouars; Alismorkis Thouars; Amblyglottis Blume; Aulostylis Schltr.; Calanthidium Pfitzer; Centrosia A.Rich.; Centrosis Sw. ex Thouars; Cephalantheropsis Guillaumin; Cyanorkis Thouars; Gastorkis Thouars; Gastrorchis Schltr.; Ghiesbreghtia A.Rich. & Galeotti; Hecabe Raf.; Limatodis Blume; Pachyne Salisb.; Paracalanthe Kudô; Paraphaius J.W.Zhai & F.W.Xing; Pesomeria Lindl.; Phaius Lour.; Phajus Hassk.; Preptanthe Rchb.f.; Styloglossum Breda; Tankervillia Link; Zeduba Ham. ex Meisn.; Zoduba Buch.-Ham. ex D.Don

= Calanthe =

Christmas orchids

Genus of orchids

Calanthe, commonly known as Christmas orchids, is a genus of about 220 species of orchids in the family Orchidaceae. They are evergreen or deciduous terrestrial plants with thick roots, small oval pseudobulbs, large corrugated leaves and upright, sometimes arching flowering stems. The sepals and petals are narrow and a similar size to each other and the labellum usually has spreading lobes.

== Description ==
Orchids in the genus Calanthe are terrestrial with small, crowded pseudobulbs with thick roots and a few corrugated or wrinkled leaves with the base tapering to a petiole-like stalk. Some species are evergreen while others are deciduous. The flowers are delicate but showy, white, pink, yellow or orange and crowded near the end of an erect, sometimes arching flowering stem. The sepals and petals are relatively narrow, similar in size and spread widely. The labellum has three or four spreading lobes and in most species there is a spur at the base. Unlike similar orchids, the labellum of Calanthe orchids is fused to the column.

== Taxonomy and naming ==
The genus Calanthe was first formally described in 1821 by Robert Brown and his manuscript was published in The Botanical Register. The name Calanthe is derived from the Ancient Greek words kallos meaning "beauty" and anthos meaning "flower".

== Distribution and habitat ==
Calanthe species are found in all tropical areas, but mostly concentrated in Southeast Asia. Some species also range into subtropical lands such as China, Indian subcontinent, Madagascar, Australia, Mexico, Central America, the West Indies and various islands of the Pacific and Indian Oceans.

== List of species ==
The following is a list of species of Calanthe recognised by the Plants of the World Online as at August 2018:

- Calanthe abbreviata (Blume) Lindl.
- Calanthe aceras Schltr.
- Calanthe africana M.W.Chase, Christenh. & Schuit.
- Calanthe alba W.Suarez & Cootes
- Calanthe albolutea Ridl.
- Calanthe alismifolia Lindl.
- Calanthe alleizettei Gagnep.
- Calanthe alpina Hook.f. ex Lindl.
- Calanthe alta Rchb.f.
- Calanthe amboinensis (Blume) M.W.Chase, Christenh. & Schuit.
- Calanthe angustifolia (Blume) Lindl.
- Calanthe aquamarina Schuit. & de Vogel
- Calanthe arcuata Rolfe
- Calanthe arfakana J.J.Sm.
- Calanthe argenteostriata C.Z.Tang & S.J.Cheng
- Calanthe arisanensis Hayata
- Calanthe aristulifera Rchb.f.
- Calanthe aruank P.Royen
- Calanthe aurantiaca Ridl.
- Calanthe aureiflora J.J.Sm.
- Calanthe averyanoviana M.W.Chase, Christenh. & Schuit.
- Calanthe baconii (J.J.Sm. & Shim) M.W.Chase, Christenh. & Schuit.
- Calanthe balansae Finet
- Calanthe baliensis J.J.Wood & J.B.Comber
- Calanthe beamanii P.J.Cribb
- Calanthe beleensis Ormerod & P.J.Cribb
- Calanthe bicalcarata J.J.Sm.
- Calanthe biloba Lindl.
- Calanthe bingtaoi J.W.Zhai, L.J.Chen & Z.J.Liu
- Calanthe bivalvis P.J.Cribb & Ormerod
- Calanthe borneensis (J.J.Sm.) M.W.Chase, Christenh. & Schuit.
- Calanthe brassii Ormerod
- Calanthe brevicornu Lindl.
- Calanthe burkei P.J.Cribb
- Calanthe calanthoides (A.Rich. & Galeotti) Hamer & Garay in F.Hamer
- Calanthe callosa (Blume) M.W.Chase, Christenh. & Schuit.
- Calanthe camptoceras Schltr.
- Calanthe cardioglossa Schltr.
- Calanthe carrii Govaerts
- Calanthe caulescens J.J.Sm.
- Calanthe caulodes J.J.Sm.
- Calanthe ceciliae Rchb.f.
- Calanthe celebica Rolfe
- Calanthe chevalieri Gagnep.
- Calanthe chloroleuca Lindl.
- Calanthe chrysoglossoides J.J.Sm.
- Calanthe clavata Lindl.
- Calanthe clavicalcar J.J.Sm.
- Calanthe claytonii P.J.Cribb
- Calanthe coiloglossa Schltr. in K.M.Schumann & C.A.G.Lauterbach
- Calanthe columnaris (C.Z.Tang & S.J.Cheng) M.W.Chase, Christenh. & Schuit.
- Calanthe conspicua Lindl.
- Calanthe coodei P.J.Cribb
- Calanthe cooperi (Rolfe) M.W.Chase, Christenh. & Schuit.
- Calanthe cootesii Naive
- Calanthe corymboides (Schltr.) M.W.Chase, Christenh. & Schuit.
- Calanthe cremeoviridis J.J.Wood
- Calanthe crenulata J.J.Sm.
- Calanthe crispifolia Ormerod
- Calanthe cruciata Schltr.
- Calanthe crumenata Ridl.
- Calanthe crystallina P.J.Cribb
- Calanthe curvatoascendens Gilli
- Calanthe daenikeri (Kraenzl.) M.W.Chase, Christenh. & Schuit.
- Calanthe davaensis Ames
- Calanthe davidii Franch.
- Calanthe daymanensis Ormerod & P.J.Cribb
- Calanthe decora M.W.Chase, Christenh. & Schuit.
- Calanthe delavayi Finet
- Calanthe densiflora Lindl.
- Calanthe devogelii P.J.Cribb & D.A.Clayton
- Calanthe discolor Lindl.
- Calanthe dolichopoda Fukuy
- Calanthe dulongensis H.Li, R.Li & Z.L.Dao
- Calanthe duyana Aver.
- Calanthe ecalcarata (J.J.Sm.) M.W.Chase, Christenh. & Schuit.
- Calanthe ecallosa J.J.Sm.
- Calanthe ecarinata Rolfe ex Hemsl.
- Calanthe emeishanica K.Y.Lang & Z.H.Tsi
- Calanthe engleriana Kraenzl. in K.M.Schumann & C.A.G.Lauterbach
- Calanthe epiphytica Carr
- Calanthe fargesii Finet
- Calanthe ferruginea M.W.Chase, Christenh. & Schuit.
- Calanthe finisterrae Schltr.
- Calanthe fissa L.O.Williams
- Calanthe flava (Blume) C.Morren
- Calanthe floresana P.J.Cribb
- Calanthe forbesii Ridl.
- Calanthe formosana Rolfe
- Calanthe fragrans P.Royen
- Calanthe francoisii (Schltr.) M.W.Chase, Christenh. & Schuit.
- Calanthe fugongensis X.H.Jin & S.C.Chen
- Calanthe geelvinkensis J.J.Sm.
- Calanthe gibbsiae Rolfe
- Calanthe goodenoughiana Ormerod & P.J.Cribb
- Calanthe graciliflora Hayata
- Calanthe graciliscapa Schltr.
- Calanthe grandiflora Nadeaud
- Calanthe grata (Blume) M.W.Chase, Christenh. & Schuit.
- Calanthe griffithii Lindl.
- Calanthe gustavii M.W.Chase, Christenh. & Schuit.
- Calanthe habbemensis Ormerod & P.J.Cribb
- Calanthe hainanensis (C.Z.Tang & S.J.Cheng) M.W.Chase & Schuit.
- Calanthe halconensis Ames
- Calanthe hancockii Rolfe
- Calanthe hattorii Schltr.
- Calanthe hekouensis (Tsukaya, M.Najak. & S.K.Wu) M.W.Chase, Christenh. & Schuit.
- Calanthe henryi Rolfe
- Calanthe herbacea Lindl.
- Calanthe himalaicum Raskoti
- Calanthe hirsuta Seidenf.
- Calanthe hololeuca Rchb.f. in B.Seemann
- Calanthe hoshii S.Kobay.
- Calanthe humblotii (Rchb.f.) M.W.Chase, Christenh. & Schuit.
- Calanthe hyacinthina Schltr.
- Calanthe imthurnii Kores
- Calanthe indigofera (Hassk.) M.W.Chase, Christenh. & Schuit.
- Calanthe indochinensis (Seidenf. & Ormerod) M.W.Chase, Christenh. & Schuit.
- Calanthe inflata Schltr.
- Calanthe insularis S.H.Oh, H.J.Suh & C.W.Park
- Calanthe izu-insularis (Satomi) Ohwi & Satomi in J.Ohwi
- Calanthe johorensis Holttum
- Calanthe judithiae P.J.Cribb
- Calanthe jusnerii Boxall ex Náves in F.M.Blanco
- Calanthe kaniensis Schltr.
- Calanthe kemulensis J.J.Sm.
- Calanthe kermodei Ormerod & Kurzweil
- Calanthe keshabii Lucksom
- Calanthe kinabaluensis Rolfe
- Calanthe kooshunensis Fukuy.
- Calanthe labiata (J.J.Sm.) M.W.Chase, Christenh. & Schuit.
- Calanthe labrosa (Rchb.f.) Rchb.f.
- Calanthe lacerata Ames
- Calanthe laciniata (Ormerod) M.W.Chase, Christenh. & Schuit.
- Calanthe lambii P.J.Cribb
- Calanthe lamellosa Rolfe
- Calanthe lancilabris Ormerod & P.J.Cribb
- Calanthe landyae (P.J.Cribb & J.V.Stone) M.W.Chase, Christenh. & Schuit.
- Calanthe lechangensis Z.H.Tsi & Tang
- Calanthe leonidii P.J.Cribb & D.A.Clayton
- Calanthe leucosceptrum Schltr.
- Calanthe leuseri P.J.Cribb
- Calanthe ligo P.J.Cribb
- Calanthe limprichtii Schltr.
- Calanthe longgangensis Y.S.Huang & Yan Liu
- Calanthe longibracteata Ridl.
- Calanthe longicornu (Guillaumin) M.W.Chase, Christenh. & Schuit.
- Calanthe longifolia Schltr.
- Calanthe longipes Hook.f.
- Calanthe lutea (Ursch & Toill.-Gen. ex Bosser) M.W.Chase, Christenh. & Schuit.
- Calanthe lyonii (Ames) M.W.Chase, Christenh. & Schuit.
- Calanthe lyroglossa Rchb.f.
- Calanthe madagascariensis Rolfe ex Hook.f.
- Calanthe mannii Hook.f.
- Calanthe maquilingensis Ames
- Calanthe masuca (D.Don) Lindl.
- Calanthe maxii P.O'Byrne
- Calanthe mcgregorii Ames
- Calanthe metoensis Z.H.Tsi & K.Y.Lang
- Calanthe micrantha Schltr.
- Calanthe microglossa Ridl.
- Calanthe millikenii P.J.Cribb
- Calanthe millotae Ursch & Genoud ex Bosser
- Calanthe mindorensis Ames, Philipp. J. Sci.
- Calanthe mishmensis (Lindl. & Paxton) M.W.Chase, Christenh. & Schuit.
- Calanthe moluccensis J.J.Sm.
- Calanthe monophylla Ridl.
- Calanthe montana (Schltr.) M.W.Chase, Christenh. & Schuit.
- Calanthe morotaiensis (Ormerod & Juswara) Schuit.
- Calanthe musa-amanii J.J.Wood
- Calanthe nana (Hook.f.) M.W.Chase, Christenh. & Schuit.
- Calanthe nankunensis Z.H.Tsi
- Calanthe nguyenthinhii Aver.
- Calanthe nicolae P.O'Byrne
- Calanthe nipponica Makino
- Calanthe nivalis Boxall ex Náves in F.M.Blanco
- Calanthe obcordata (Lindl.) M.W.Chase, Christenh. & Schuit.
- Calanthe obreniformis J.J.Sm.
- Calanthe odora Griff.
- Calanthe okinawensis Hayata
- Calanthe oreadum Rendle
- Calanthe otuhanica C.L.Chan & T.J.Barkman
- Calanthe ovalifolia Ridl.
- Calanthe ovata Ridl.
- Calanthe parvilabris Schltr.
- Calanthe pauciflora (Blume) M.W.Chase, Christenh. & Schuit.
- Calanthe pauciverrucosa J.J.Sm.
- Calanthe pavairiensis Ormerod
- Calanthe perrottetii A.Rich.
- Calanthe petelotiana Gagnep.
- Calanthe peyrotii (Bosser) M.W.Chase, Christenh. & Schuit.
- Calanthe philippinensis (N.E.Br.) M.W.Chase, Christenh. & Schuit.
- Calanthe plantaginea Lindl.
- Calanthe poiformis P.J.Cribb & Ormerod
- Calanthe polyantha Gilli
- Calanthe puberula Lindl.
- Calanthe pulchella (Kraenzl.) M.W.Chase, Christenh. & Schuit.
- Calanthe pulchra (Blume) Lindl.
- Calanthe pullei J.J.Sm.
- Calanthe punctata Kurzweil
- Calanthe reflexilabris J.J.Sm.
- Calanthe reflexipetals (J.J.Wood & Shim) M.W.Chase, Christenh. & Schuit.
- Calanthe rhodochila Schltr.
- Calanthe rigida Carr
- Calanthe robertsii (F.Muell.) M.W.Chase, Christenh. & Schuit.
- Calanthe rosea (Lindl.) Benth.
- Calanthe rubens Ridl.
- Calanthe rubra S.H.Oh, H.J.Suh & C.W.Park
- Calanthe ruthiae (P.T.Ong & P.O'Byrne) Schuit.
- Calanthe ruttenii J.J.Sm.
- Calanthe saccata J.J.Sm.
- Calanthe sacculata Schltr.
- Calanthe salaccensis J.J.Sm.
- Calanthe sandsii P.J.Cribb
- Calanthe scaposa Z.H.Tsi & K.Y.Lang
- Calanthe secunda P.J.Cribb
- Calanthe seranica J.J.Sm.
- Calanthe siargaoensis M.Leon, Naive & Cootes
- Calanthe sieboldopsis B.Y.Yang & Bo Li
- Calanthe simplex Seidenf.
- Calanthe simulans (Rolfe) M.W.Chase, Christenh. & Schuit.
- Calanthe sinica Z.H.Tsi
- Calanthe solomonensis P.J.Cribb & D.A.Clayton
- Calanthe spathoglottoides Schltr.
- Calanthe speciosa (Blume) Lindl.
- Calanthe steinhardtiana (Senghas) M.W.Chase, Christenh. & Schuit.
- Calanthe stella P.J.Cribb
- Calanthe stenocentron (Schltr.) M.W.Chase, Christenh. & Schuit.
- Calanthe striata R.Br. ex Spreng.
- Calanthe subtriloba (Ames & C.Schweinf.) M.W.Chase, Christenh. & Schuit.
- Calanthe succedanea Gagnep.
- Calanthe sylvatica (Thouars) Lindl.
- Calanthe taenioides J.J.Sm.
- Calanthe tahitensis Nadeaud
- Calanthe taibaishanensis M.Guo, J.W.Zhai & L.J.Chen
- Calanthe takeoi Hayata
- Calanthe takeuchii Ormerod & P.J.Cribb
- Calanthe tankervilleae (Banks) M.W.Chase, Christenh. & Schuit.
- Calanthe tenuis Ames & C.Schweinf.
- Calanthe testacea M.W.Chase, Christenh. & Schuit.
- Calanthe tetragona (Thoars) M.W.Chase, Christenh. & Schuit.
- Calanthe tonkinensis (Aver.) M.W.Chase, Christenh. & Schuit.
- Calanthe torricellensis Schltr. in K.M.Schumann & C.A.G.Lauterbach
- Calanthe transiens J.J.Sm.
- Calanthe tricarinata Lindl.
- Calanthe trichoneura (Schltr.) M.W.Chase, Christenh. & Schuit.
- Calanthe trifida Tang & F.T.Wang
- Calanthe triplicata (Willemet) Ames
- Calanthe trulliformis King & Pantl.
- Calanthe truncata J.J.Sm.
- Calanthe truncicola Schltr.
- Calanthe tsiana Y.Q.Chen, J.W.Zhai & S.R.Lan
- Calanthe tsoongiana Tang & F.T.Wang
- Calanthe tuberculosa (Thoars) M.W.Chase, Christenh. & Schuit.
- Calanthe uncata Lindl.
- Calanthe undulata J.J.Sm.
- Calanthe unifolia Ridl.
- Calanthe velutina Ridl.
- Calanthe ventilabrum Rchb.f. in B.Seemann
- Calanthe versteegii J.J.Sm.
- Calanthe vestita Wall. ex Lindl.
- Calanthe villosa J.J.Sm.
- Calanthe villosagastris (Thoars) M.W.Chase, Christenh. & Schuit.
- Calanthe wallichii (Lindl.) M.W.Chase, Christenh. & Schuit.
- Calanthe wenshanensis J.W.Zhai, L.J.Chen & Z.J.Liu
- Calanthe whistleri P.J.Cribb & D.A.Clayton
- Calanthe whiteana King & Pantl.
- Calanthe womersleyi P.J.Cribb & Ormerod
- Calanthe woodfordii (Hook.) M.W.Chase, Christenh. & Schuit.
- Calanthe woodii P.J.Cribb
- Calanthe wuxiensis H.P.Deng & F.Q.Yu
- Calanthe yaoshanensis Z.X.Ren & H.Wang
- Calanthe yueana Tang & F.T.Wang
- Calanthe yuksomnensis Lucksom
- Calanthe zollingeri Rchb.f.

== Gallery ==
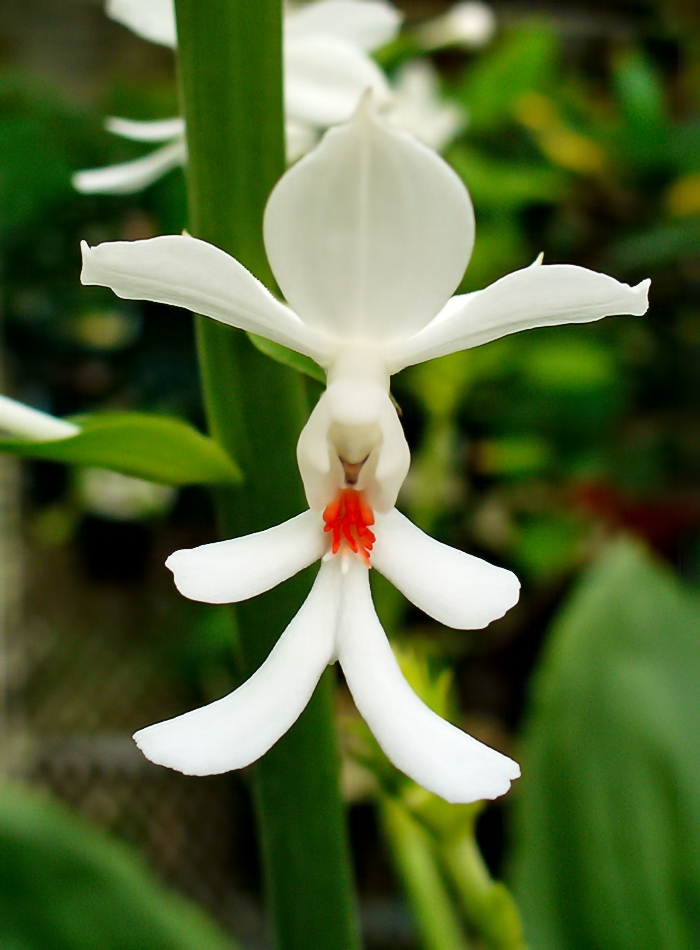
Calanthe triplicata, the Calanthe type species, from Florida International University

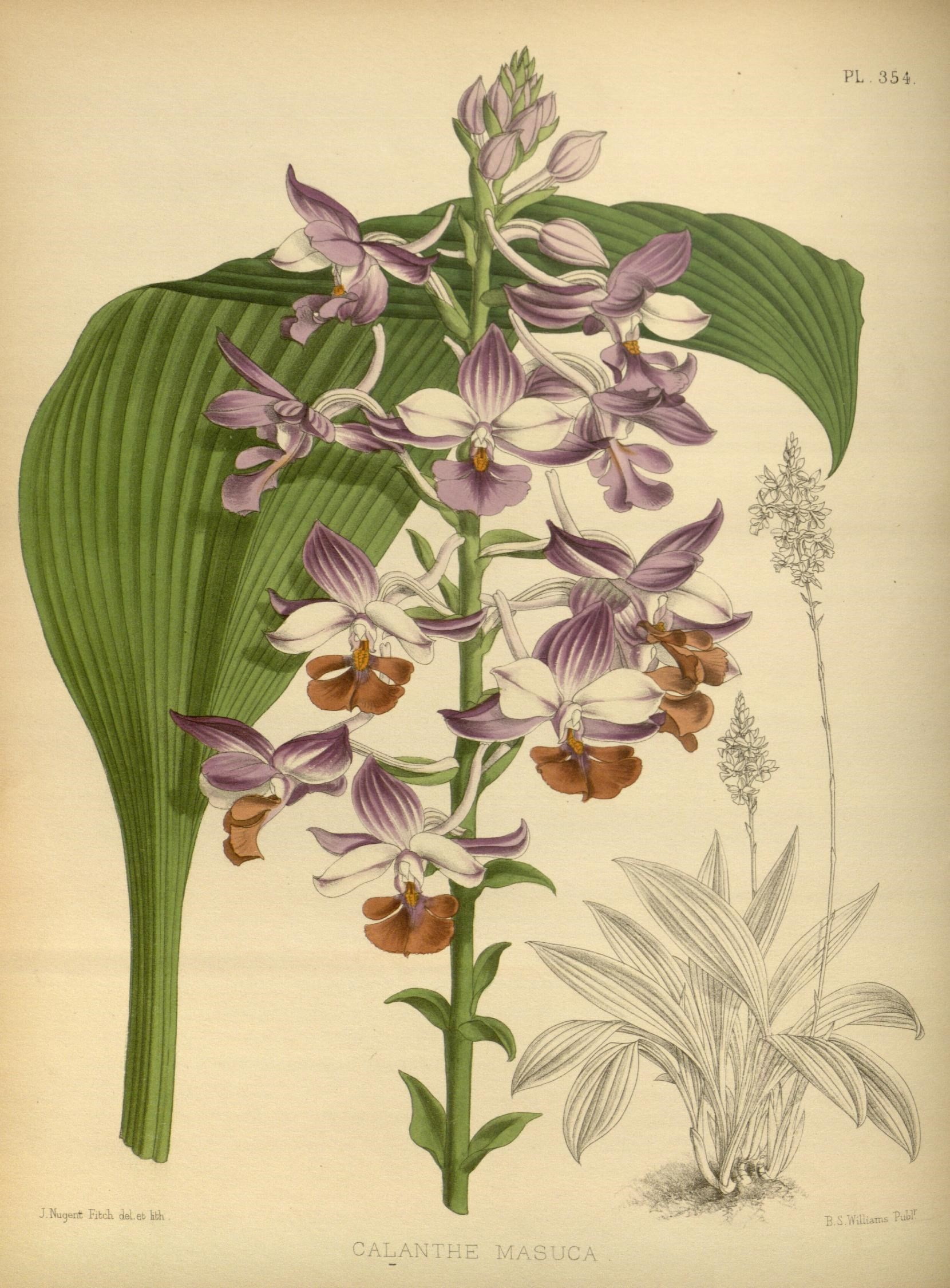
Botanical illustration of Calanthe masuca, from The Orchid Album vol. 8

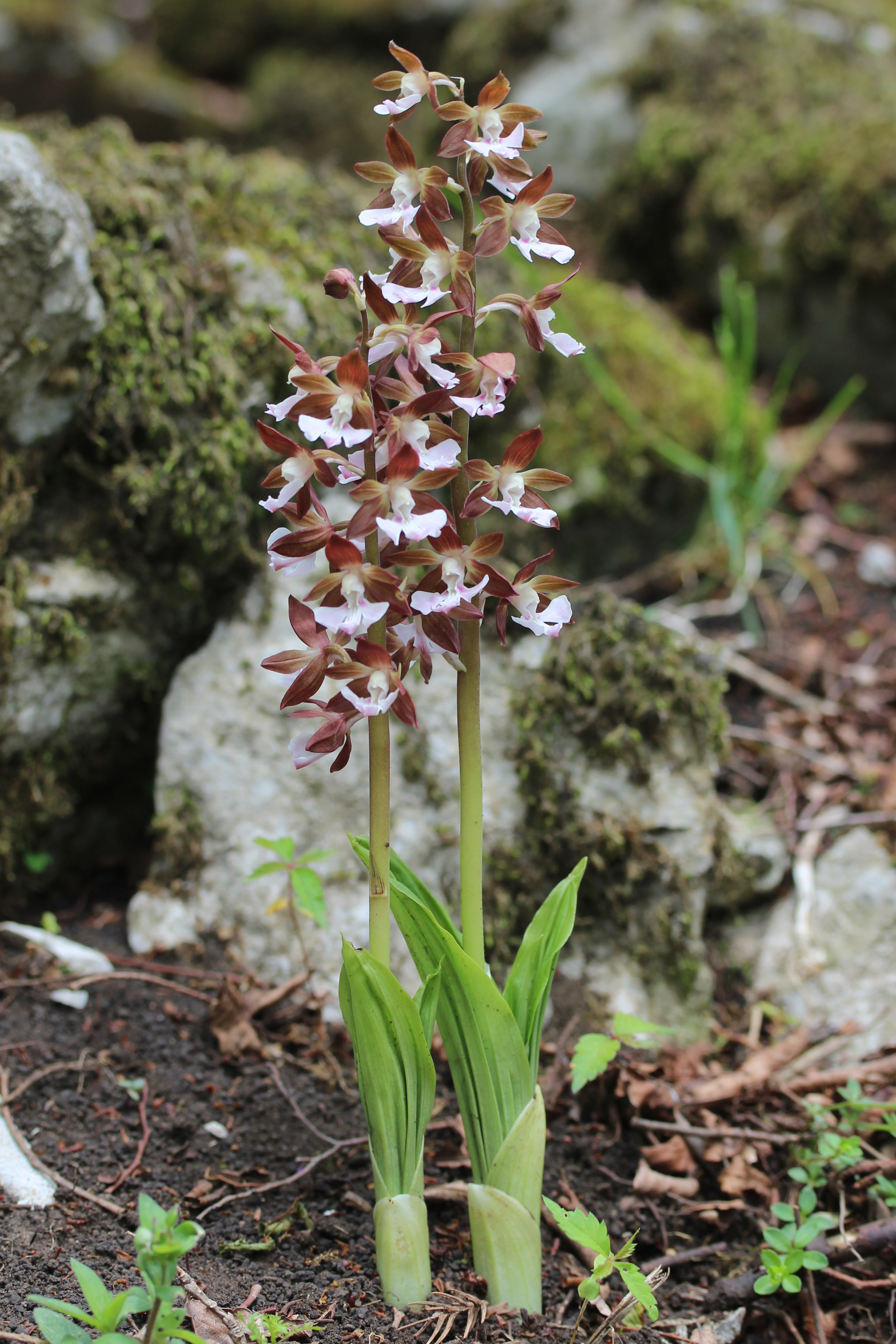
Calanthe discolor from Shiga prefecture, Japan

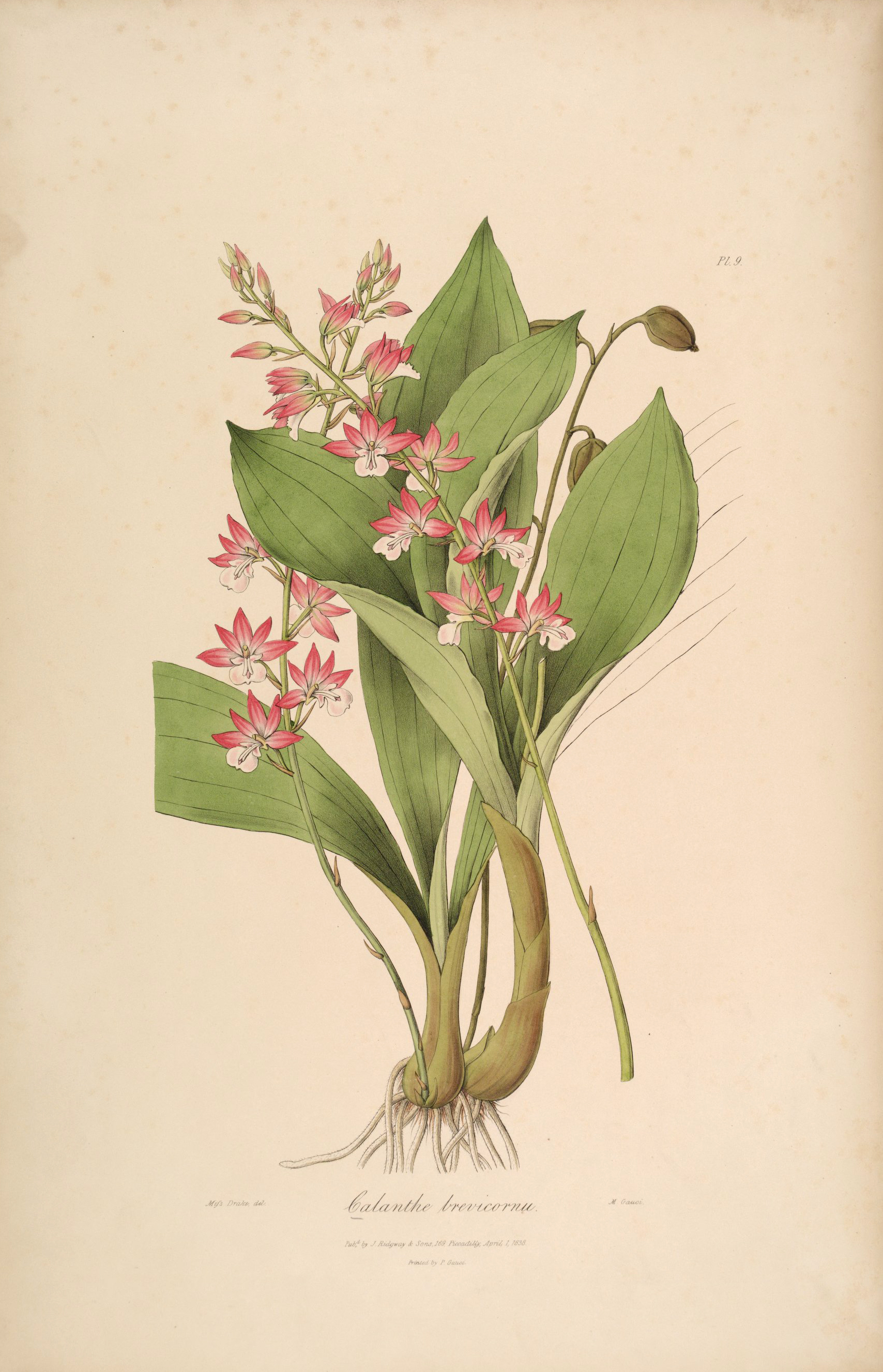
Botanical illustration of Calanthe brevicornu from John Lindley's Sertum Orchidaceum

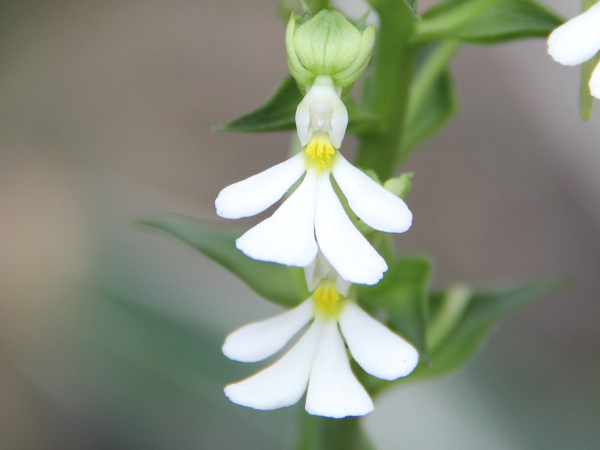
Flowers of Calanthe argenteostriata

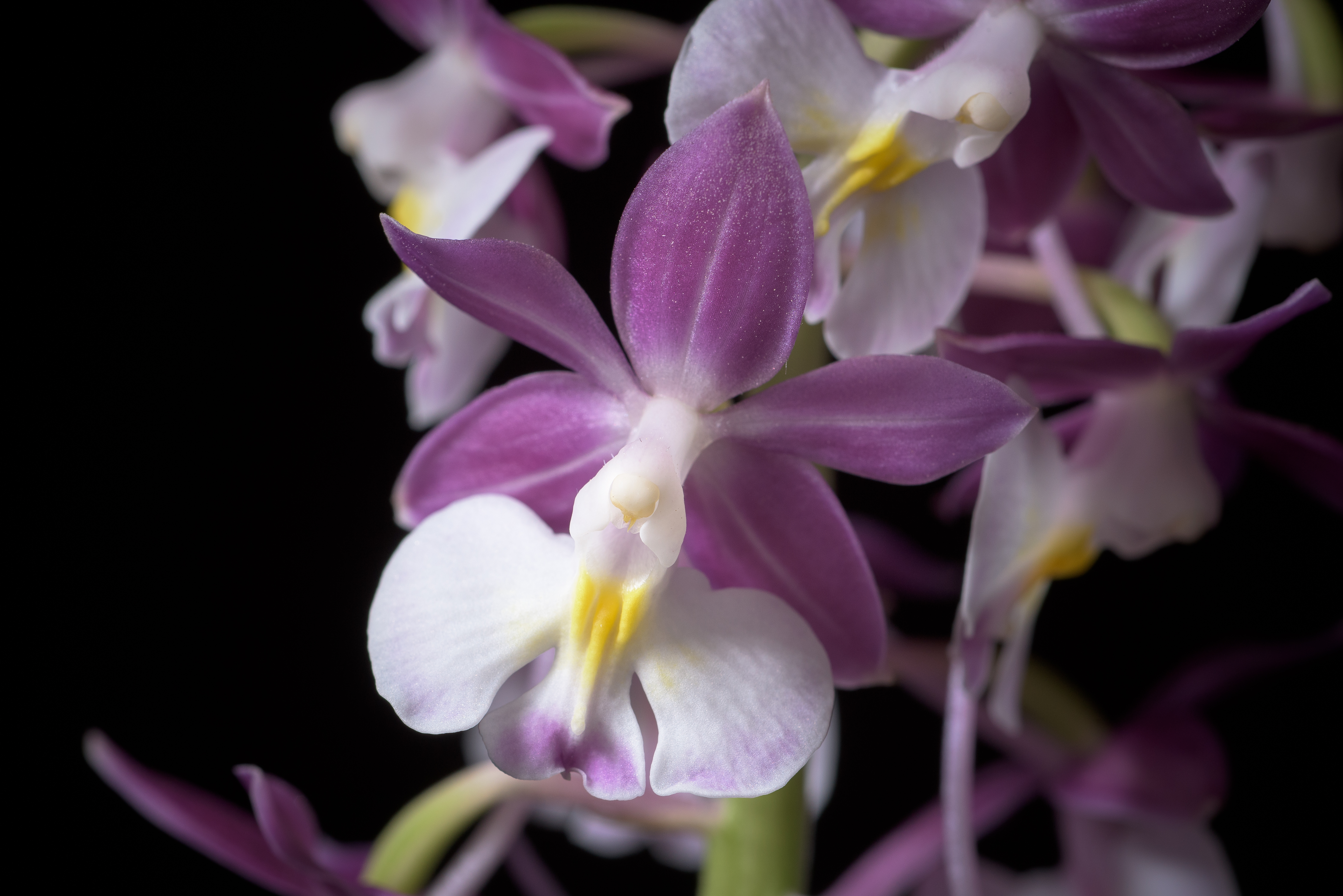
Flowers of Calanthe izu-insularis
