= Catanthera =

Scientific classification
- Kingdom: Plantae
- Clade: Tracheophytes
- Clade: Angiosperms
- Clade: Eudicots
- Clade: Rosids
- Order: Myrtales
- Family: Melastomataceae
- Genus: Catanthera; F.Muell.

Genus of flowering plants

Catanthera is a genus of flowering plants belonging to the family Melastomataceae.

Its native range is Borneo, New Guinea and Maluku.

Species:

- Catanthera brassii (Nayar) Nayar
- Catanthera endertii (Nayar) Nayar
- Catanthera keris Veldkamp
- Catanthera kinabaluensis (Nayar) Nayar
- Catanthera longistylis (Mansf.) Nayar
- Catanthera lysipetala F.Muell.
- Catanthera multiflora (Stapf) Nayar
- Catanthera novoguineensis M.P.Nayar
- Catanthera nummularia Bygrave
- Catanthera ovata (Nayar) Nayar
- Catanthera paniculata (Nayar) Nayar
- Catanthera peltata M.P.Nayar
- Catanthera pilosa M.P.Nayar
- Catanthera quintuplinervis (Cogn.) Nayar
- Catanthera royenii M.P.Nayar
- Catanthera schlechteri (Mansf.) Nayar
- Catanthera sleumeri M.P.Nayar
- Catanthera tawaensis (Merr.) Regalado
- Catanthera tetrandra (Stapf) Nayar
