= Calanthe cardioglossa =

Scientific classification
- Kingdom: Plantae
- Clade: Tracheophytes
- Clade: Angiosperms
- Clade: Monocots
- Order: Asparagales
- Family: Orchidaceae
- Subfamily: Epidendroideae
- Genus: Calanthe
- Species: C. cardioglossa

Binomial name
- Calanthe cardioglossa Schltr.

Synonyms
- Synonymy: Calanthe hosseusiana Kraenzl.; Calanthe cardiochila Kraenzl.

Species of Orchid

Calanthe cardioglossa, the heart-lipped calanthe, is a terrestrial orchid species. It was first described in 1906 by Rudolf Schlechter. The species name "cardioglossa" comes from the Greek words "kardia" (heart) and "glossa" (tongue), referring to the heart-shaped base of its lip.

== Description ==
The plants are deciduous herbs, typically growing 19 to 68 cm tall. They feature prominent, conical pseudobulbs that are 2.5 to 8.5 cm long and 1.5 to 3 cm wide. These pseudobulbs are covered by grayish, silvery sheaths and can have one to four leaves, which are usually shed before the flowering season. The leaves are lanceolate-oblong, acute, or acuminate, measuring 15 to 47 cm long and 4 to 7 cm wide, with petioles that are 3 to 9 cm long.

The inflorescence is a softly pubescent raceme that arises from the base of the pseudobulb. The peduncle is 10 to 53 cm long and bears a few sterile bracts. The raceme is lax to semi-dense and can have 5 to 20 flowers. The flowers are 14 to 18 mm across and are typically pink to lilac, with the lip marked by red and white lines and patches. Some variants may have white petals with red dots. As they age, the flowers often turn orange-red. The sepals and petals are usually recurved. The sepals are ovate-lanceolate and pubescent on the outside, measuring 9 to 14 mm long. The petals are ovate-elliptic and glabrous, 9.3 to 14 mm long.

The most distinctive feature is the lip, which is 9 to 15 mm long and 13 to 22 mm wide. It is shallowly to deeply 3-lobed with a heart-shaped base. The midlobe is rounded-oblong, while the side lobes are suberect and have undulate margins. The lip features three fleshy keels at its base, with the central one extending onto the midlobe. A slender, straight spur, 15 to 28 mm long and held parallel to the ovary, is also present. The column is short, 3 to 5 mm long. The ovary, which is indistinguishable from the pedicel, is 23 to 50 mm long and often dark purple.

== Distribution and habitat ==
Calanthe cardioglossa is widely distributed across Thailand, particularly common in the northern and eastern regions. It is also found in Indochina, including Laos and Vietnam (Dalat). This species is terrestrial, found in humus and soil in evergreen and deciduous forests. It can also be found as a lithophyte, growing among limestone boulders. The species thrives at elevations ranging from 300 to 1,640 meters.

== Flowering and phenology ==
This orchid species flowers primarily from October to January, with the leaves dropping during the dry season, often before the inflorescence appears.
