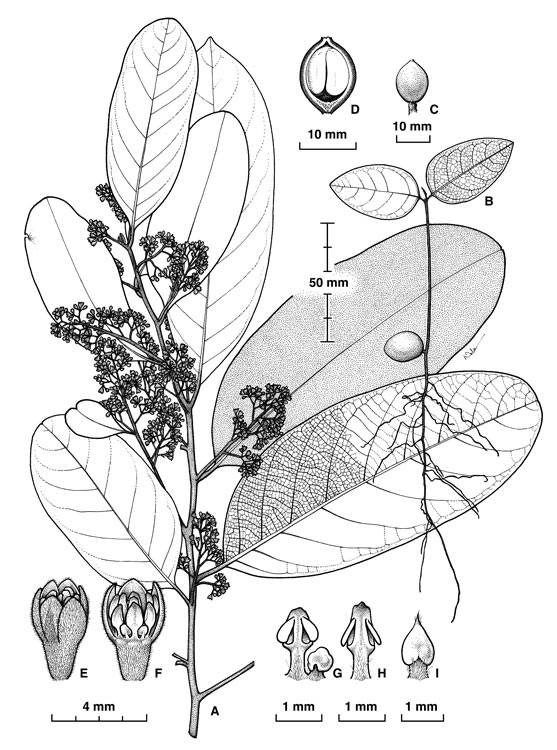

Conservation status
- Least Concern (IUCN 3.1)

Scientific classification
- Kingdom: Plantae
- Clade: Tracheophytes
- Clade: Angiosperms
- Clade: Magnoliids
- Order: Laurales
- Family: Lauraceae
- Genus: Cryptocarya
- Species: C. brassii

Binomial name
- Cryptocarya brassii C.K.Allen

= Cryptocarya brassii =

Yellow laurel

Species of tree

Cryptocarya brassii is a species of flowering plant in the laurel family and is native to far north Queensland and Papua New Guinea. Its leaves are elliptic to oblong or lance-shaped, the flowers cream-coloured and tube-shaped, and the fruit an elliptic black to bluish-black drupe.

== Description ==
Cryptocarya brassii is a tree that typically grows to a height of 20 m (66 ft), its stem sometimes buttressed. Its leaves are elliptic to oblong or lance-shaped 100–140 mm (3.9–5.5 in) long and 35–65 mm (1.4–2.6 in) wide on a petiole 7–13 mm (0.28–0.51 in) long. The leaves are pinnately veined and more or less glaucous on the lower surface. The flowers are cream-coloured and arranged in panicles about the same length as long as the leaves. The tepals are 1.5–1.6 mm (0.059–0.063 in) long, the outer anthers 0.7–0.9 mm (0.028–0.035 in) long and 0.5–0.7 mm (0.020–0.028 in) wide, the inner anthers 0.8–1.0 mm (0.031–0.039 in) long and about 0.5 mm (0.020 in) wide. Flowering occurs in September, and the fruit is an elliptic black or bluish-black drupe 14–15 mm (0.55–0.59 in) long and about 11 mm (0.43 in) wide.

== Taxonomy ==
Cryptocarya brassii was first formally described in 1942 by Caroline Kathryn Allen in the Journal of the Arnold Arboretum from specimens collected in the Middle Fly River by Leonard John Brass.

== Distribution and habitat ==
This species of laurel grows in gallery forest at elevations between 40 and 100 m (130 and 330 ft) from Bamaga to Coen on Cape York Peninsula and in southern New Guinea.
