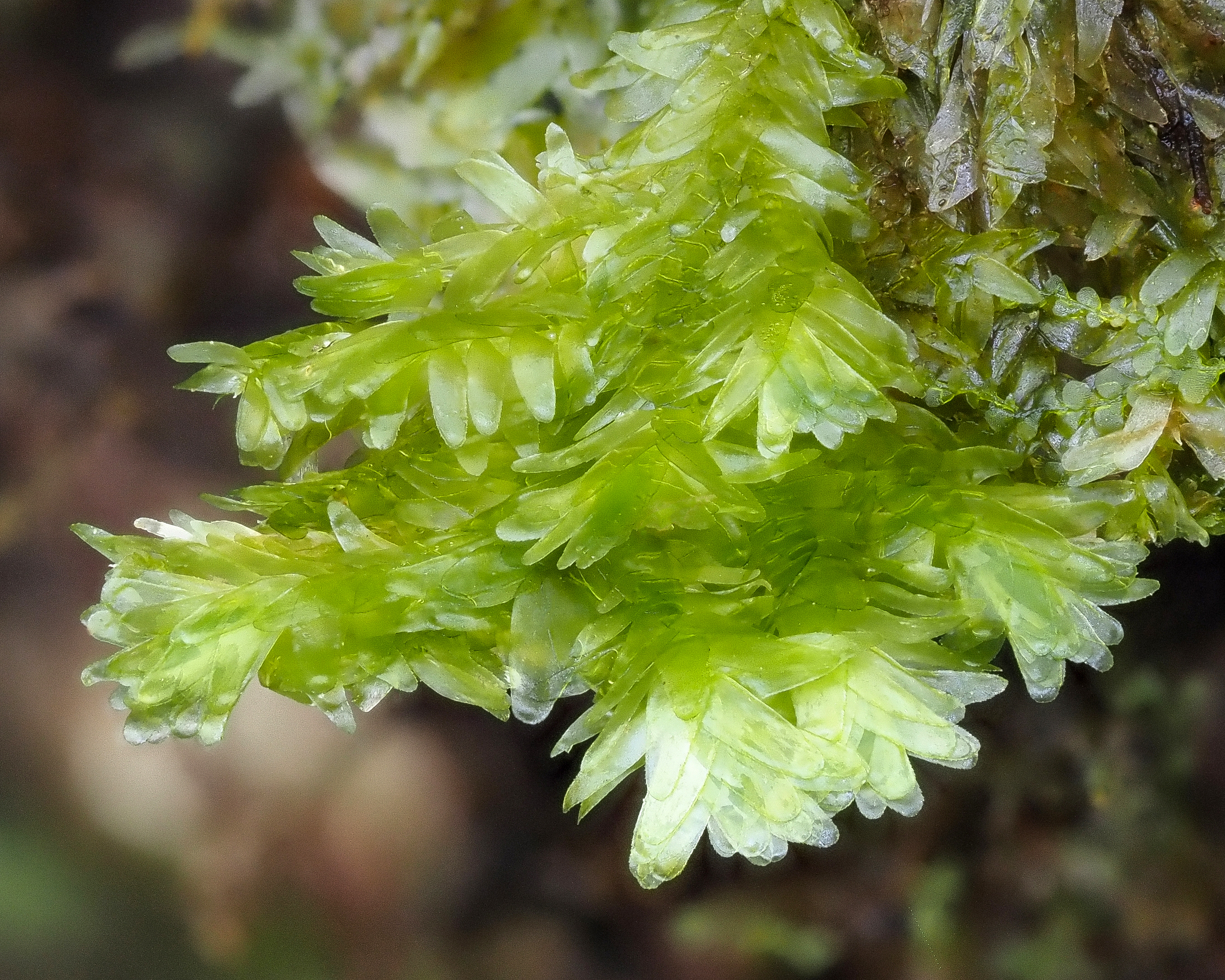
- Symphyodon pygmaeus

Scientific classification
- Kingdom: Plantae
- Clade: Embryophytes
- Division: Bryophyta
- Class: Bryopsida
- Subclass: Bryidae
- Order: Hypnales
- Family: Symphyodontaceae; M. Fleisch.

Genera
- See text

= Symphyodontaceae =

Family of mosses

Symphyodontaceae is a moss family in the order Hypnales.

== Genera ==
The family Symphyodontaceae contains the following genera:

- Chaetomitriopsis M. Fleisch.
- Chaetomitrium Dozy & Molk.
- Dimorphocladon Dixon
- Rheoshevockia Ignatov, W.Z. Ma & D.G. Long
- Symphyodon Mont.
- Trachythecium M. Fleisch.
- Unclejackia Ignatov, T. Kop. & D. Norris
