= Chaetomitrium =

Scientific classification
- Kingdom: Plantae
- Division: Bryophyta
- Class: Bryopsida
- Subclass: Bryidae
- Order: Hypnales
- Family: Symphyodontaceae
- Genus: Chaetomitrium; Dozy & Molkenboer, 1846

Type species
- C. elongatum (Dozy & Molkenboer) Dozy & Molkenboer

Species
- see text

Genus of mosses

Chaetomitrium is a genus of mosses in the family Symphyodontaceae.

== Species list ==
- C. acanthocarpum
- C. aneitense
- C. auriculatum
- C. beccarii
- C. borbonicum
- C. borneense
- C. brassii
- C. callichrous
- C. ciliatum
- C. comorense
- C. confertum
- C. ctenidioides
- C. cucullatum
- C. densum
- C. depressum
- C. dusenii
- C. elegans
- C. elmeri
- C. elongatum
- C. everettii
- C. fimbriatum
- C. friedense
- C. frondosum
- C. hebridense
- C. horridulum
- C. integrifolium
- C. laevifolium
- C. laevisetum
- C. lanceolatum
- C. lancifolium
- C. lauterbachii
- C. leptopoma
- C. macrohystrix
- C. madangense
- C. nanohystrix
- C. nervosum
- C. orthorrhynchum
- C. papillifolium
- C. parcesetulosum
- C. perakense
- C. perarmatum
- C. perlaeve
- C. philippinense
- C. plicatum
- C. poecilophyllum
- C. pseudoelongatum
- C. recurvifolium
- C. robbinsii
- C. roemeri
- C. schofieldii
- C. seramensis
- C. seriatum
- C. setosum
- C. sikkimense
- C. smithii
- C. speciosum
- C. spinosum
- C. spuriosubtile
- C. sublaevisetum
- C. subplicatum
- C. tahitense
- C. torquescens
- C. volutum
- C. vrieseanum
- C. warburgii
- C. weberi
- C. werneri
- C. wheeleri
