= Minosuke Hiroe =

- Born: June 7, 1914
- Died: January 12, 2000 (aged 85)
- Citizenship: Japanese
- Known for: Studies on Umbelliferae
- Scientific career
- Fields: Plant taxonomy
- Author abbrev. (botany): M.Hiroe

Minosuke Hiroe (Japanese: 廣江美之助; 7 June 1914 – 12 January 2000) was a Japanese botanist. His main works are on the Umbelliferae, from which family he described many new species. His work has been criticized by Lincoln Constance.

== Books ==
- M. Hiroe, 1990. Kyoto matsuri to hana. Ed. Seiseisha; Shohan ed. 207 pp. ISBN 4-915534-25-1
- M. Hiroe, 1980. Sōsa shokubutsugaku/Criminal investigation botany section. Ed. Ariake Shoten, Shōwa
- M. Hiroe, 1979. Umbelliferae of World. Ed. Ariake Book Co. 2128 pp.
- M. Hiroe, 1971. Orchid Flowers. Two vols. (English, Latín, Japanese) Ed. Kyoto:Kyoto-Shoin Co
- M. Hiroe, 1958. Umbelliferae of Asia: (excluding Japan). Ed. Eikodo
- M. Hiroe, Lincoln Constance|Constance, L. Umbelliferae of Japan. University of California Publications in Botany 30 (1.)
