= Willem van Outhoorn =

Dutch colonial governor

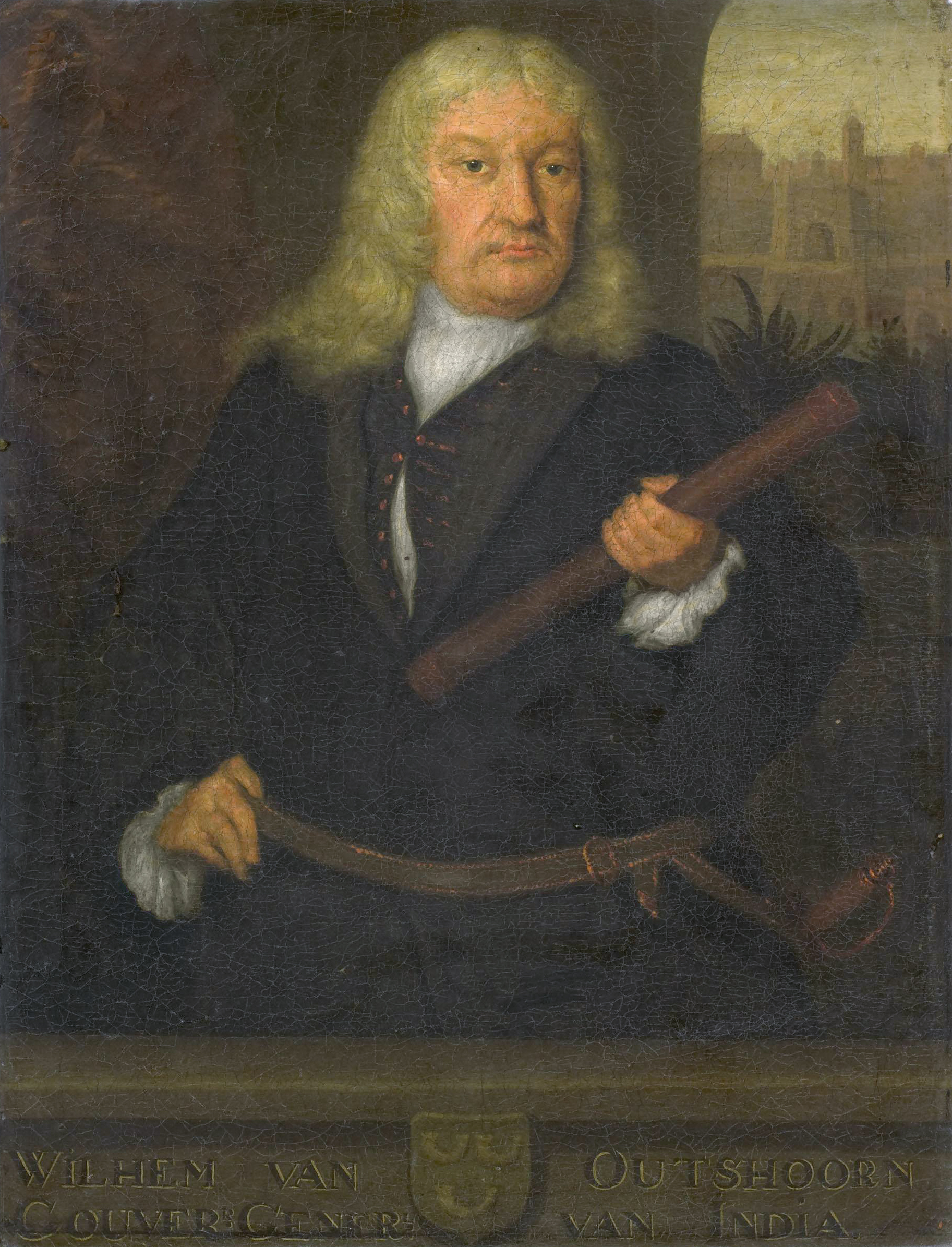
- Portrait of Willem van Outhoorn

Governor-General of the Dutch East Indies
- In office 24 September 1691 – 15 August 1704
- Preceded by: Johannes Camphuys
- Succeeded by: Joan van Hoorn

Personal details
- Born: 4 May 1635 Larike, Ambon Island, Dutch East Indies
- Died: 27 November 1720 (aged 85) Batavia, Dutch East Indies (present-day Indonesia)

Willem van Outhoorn (4 May 1635 – 27 November 1720) was Governor-General of the Dutch East Indies from 1691 to 1704. He was born and died in the Dutch East Indies.

== Biography ==
Willem van Outhoorn (or Oudthoorn) was born on 4 May 1635 at Larike on Ambon Island in Indonesia. His father was a Dutch East India Company (VOC) Buyer (koopman) there. He was sent to the Netherlands to study Law at the University of Leiden. On 28 November 1657 he graduated in Law.

=== Government career ===
In 1659 van Outhoorn returned to the Indies, employed as Underbuyer (onderkoopman). He was to remain in the East for the rest of his life. Even a journey to nearby Bantam was a journey too far for him. In 1662 he became a member of the Council of Justice (Raad van Justitie) in Batavia. In 1672 he became Receiver-General (ontvanger-generaal), and in 1673 he became Vice-President of the Council of Justice. In 1678 he was charged with a mission to Bantam and he became an extraordinary member of the Dutch Council of the Indies. He was named a full Counsellor, being confirmed in that post in 1681. He became President of the Council of Justice in 1682 and in 1689 President of the College van Heemraden (dealing with estate boundaries, roads, etc.). That same year he was appointed First Counsellor and Director-General of the Dutch East Indies.

On 17 December 1690 van Outhoorn was appointed Governor-General of the Dutch East Indies, taking over from Johannes Camphuys on 24 September 1691. After ten years, the Seventeen Lords (Heren XVII) granted his wish to be honourably relieved of his duties, but it was 15 August 1704 before he could hand over all his official functions to his successor, Joan van Hoorn.

He requested that he be allowed to remain on his estate just outside Batavia. Such requests were generally not allowed, for fear that retired governors would interfere with the work of their successors. However, because he was in ill-health and was over 70, he was allowed to stay. He died at age 85 on 27 November 1720 in Batavia.

His term of office was not marked by many important developments or events. At the end of his term, Amangkurat II Sultan of Mataram died. As the VOC did not recognise his son as successor, a long war broke out just before Van Outhoorn left office. In 1693 the French overran Pondicherry. During his time, efforts were made to establish coffee growing in Java. The first harvest failed because of flooding, but the next harvest had more success.

Van Outhoorn was not a very strong ruler. Corruption and nepotism, in which he was also involved, became more blatant during his time. His son-in-law Joan van Hoorn, married to his daughter Susanna, succeeded him as Governor-General.

== Sources ==
- Site in Dutch dedicated to the VOC
- Encyclopaedie van Nederlandsch-Indië, part N-Soek
- Putten, L.P. van, 2002. - Ambitie en onvermogen : gouverneurs-generaal van Nederlands-Indië 1610-1796.
- bezuidenhout.nl
- A History of Modern Indonesia Since c. 1300
