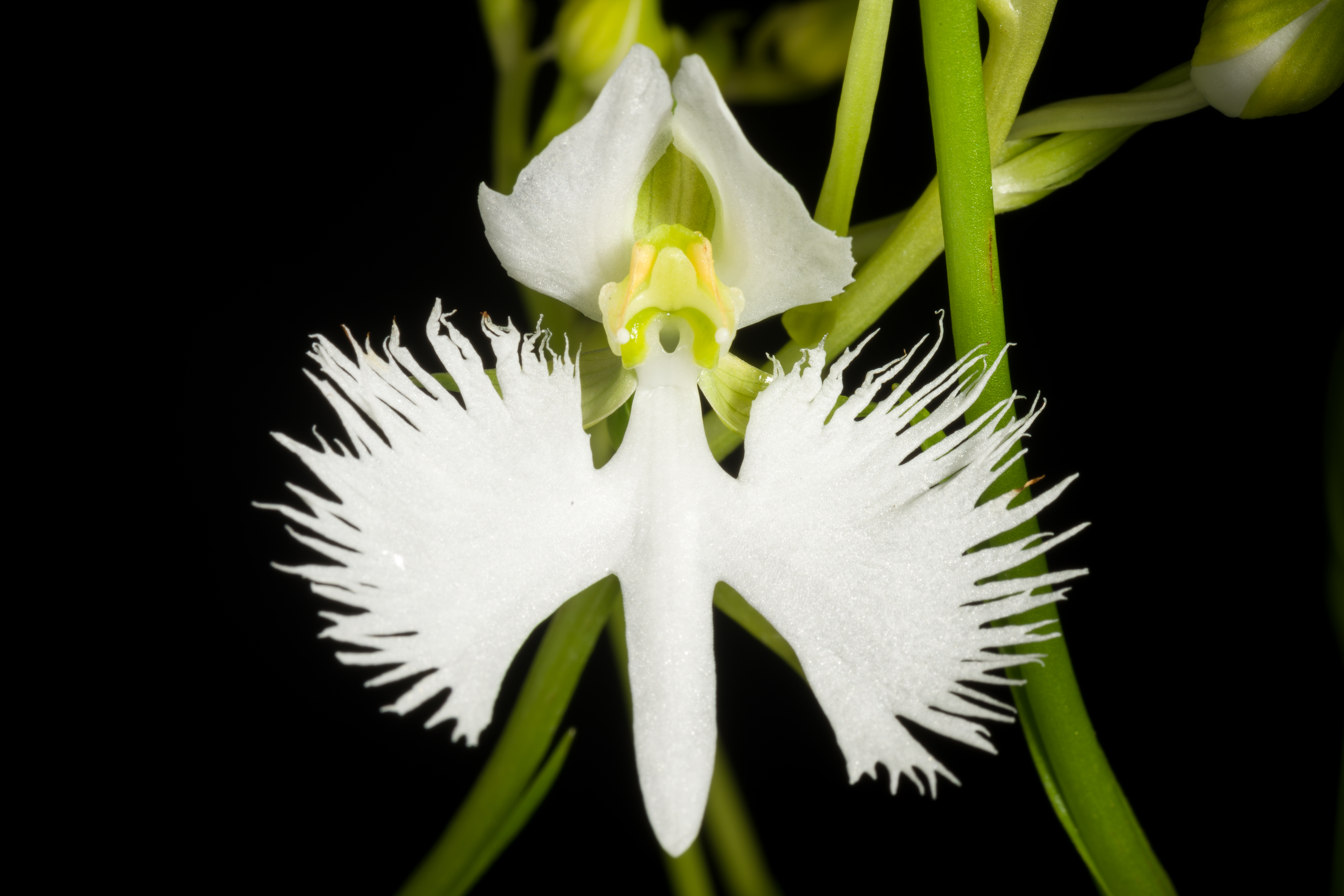

Scientific classification
- Kingdom: Plantae
- Clade: Tracheophytes
- Clade: Angiosperms
- Clade: Monocots
- Order: Asparagales
- Family: Orchidaceae
- Subfamily: Orchidoideae
- Genus: Pecteilis
- Species: P. radiata

Binomial name
- Pecteilis radiata (Thunb.) Raf.

Synonyms
- Orchis radiata Thunb. (basionym); Platanthera radiata (Thunb.) Lindl.; Pecteilis radiata (Thunb.) Raf.; Hemihabenaria radiata (Thunb.) Finet; Plantaginorchis radiata (Thunb.) Szlach.; Orchis susannae Thunb.; Habenaria dianthoides Nevski; Habenaria radiata (Thunb.) Spreng.; Habenaria radiata var. dianthoides (Nevski) Vyschin; Pecteilis dianthoides (Nevski) Garay & G.A. Romero; Plantaginorchis dianthoides (Nevski) Szlach.

= Pecteilis radiata =

White egret flower

Species of orchid

Pecteilis radiata (syn. Habenaria radiata) is a species of orchid found in China, Japan, Korea and Russia. It is commonly known as the white egret flower, fringed orchid or sagisō (鷺草). Pecteilis radiata grows with small tubers, from which grasslike leaves emerge. Flower spikes, which can be up to 50 cm tall, produce 2-3 white flowers that bloom in late summer. It is not to be confused with the white fringed orchid Platanthera praeclara, which is a North American species. Pecteilis radiata is the official flower of Setagaya ward, Tokyo. It has been highly popularized by the video game Omori, which states that it symbolizes the phrase “My thoughts will follow you into your dreams."
