= Wildflowers of Pakistan =

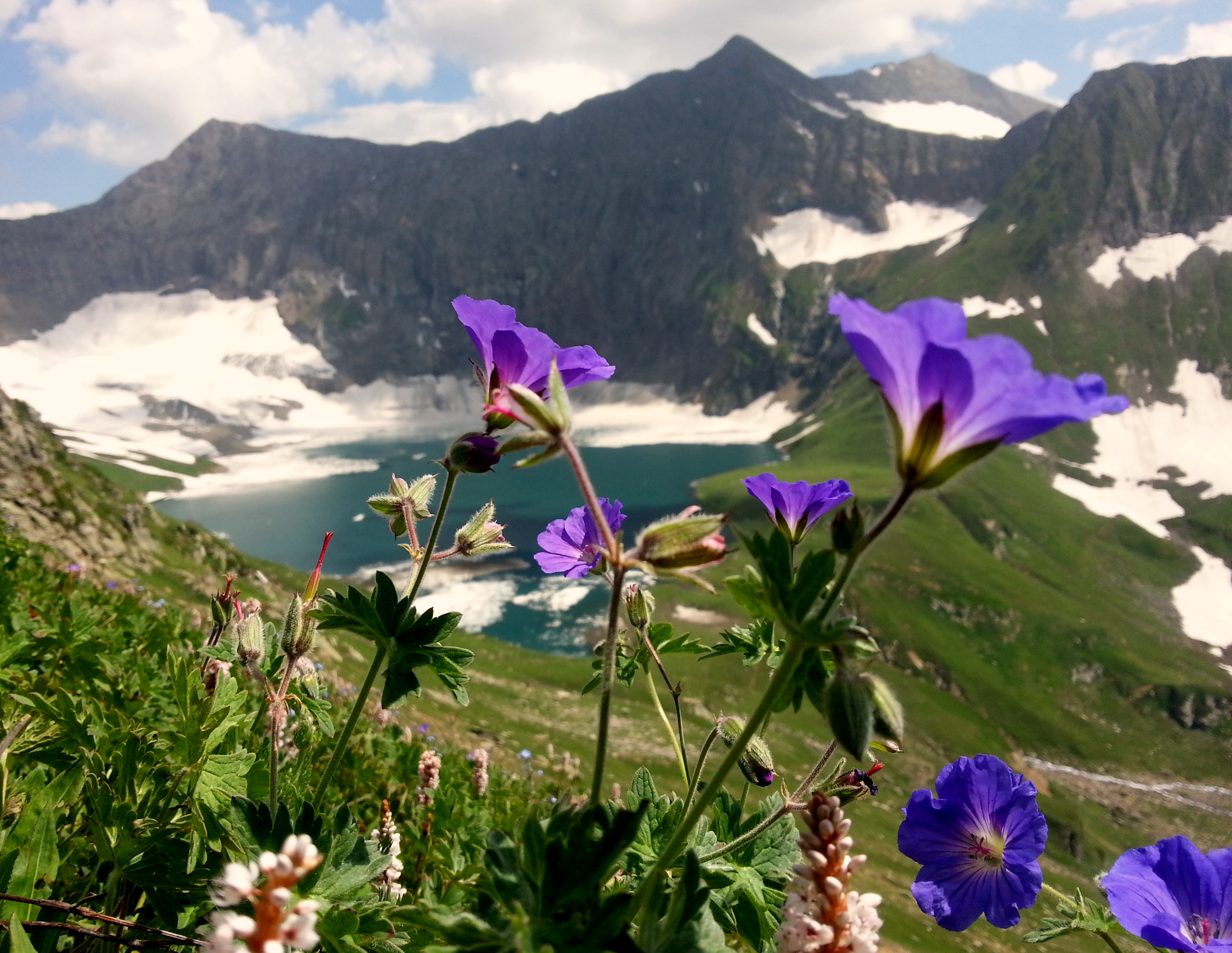
Flowers around Ratti Gali Lake.

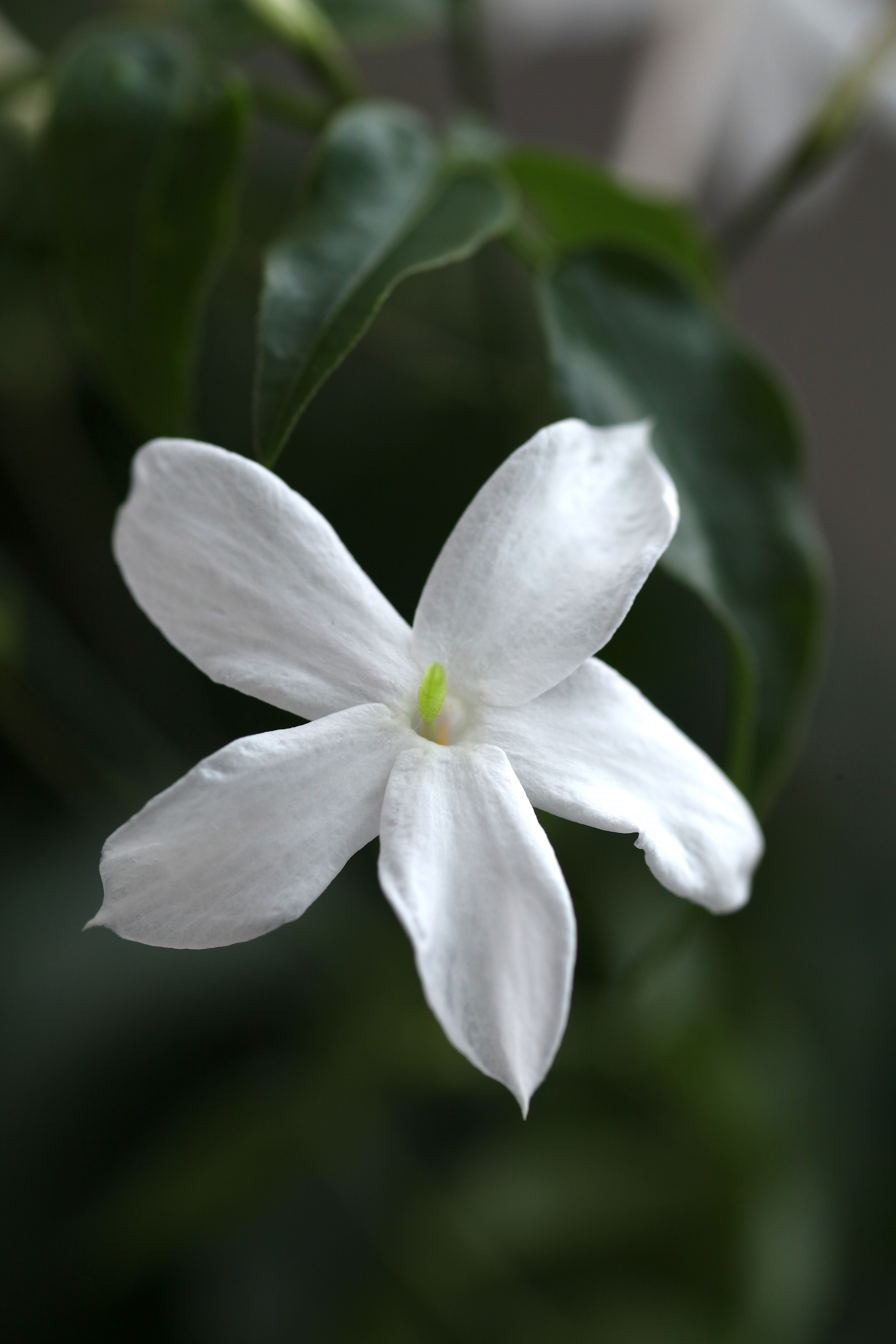
The Common Jasmine is the Official National flower of Pakistan.

- Dandelion
- Common jasmine (national flower of Pakistan)
- Clematis gouriana
- Lantana (introduced)
- Phyla nodiflora
- Convolvulus arvensis
- Thistle
- Echinops niveus
- Typha latifolia
- Datura stramonium (introduced)
- Calotropis
- Justicia adhatoda
- Cardiocrinum giganteum
- Water hyacinth (introduced)
- Nelumbo nucifera
- Gloriosa superba
- Viola odorata (introduced)
- Viola biflora
- Lysimachia arvensis(introduced)
- Commelina benghalensis
- Gentiana olivieri
- Iris spuria
- Astrohibiscus caesius
- Meconopsis
- Geranium wallichianum
- Rosa brunonii
- Rosa macrophylla
- Rosa webbiana
- Fragaria nubicola
- Catharanthus roseus (introduced)
- Vinca major
- Common sunflower (introduced)
- Cypripedium
- Cymbidium macrorhizon
- Calanthe tricarinata
- Calanthe plantaginea
- Pecteilis gigantea
- Satyrium nepalense
- Epipactis helleborine
- Dactylorhiza hatagirea
- Rhododendron arboreum
- Rhododendron ponticum
- Indigofera heterantha
- Helicteres isora
- Oleander
- Incarvillea emodi
- Tulipa clusiana
- Himalayan balsam
- Kashmir balsam
- Delphinium brunonianum
- Drumstick primula
- White clover
- Bistorta affinis
- Morina
- Ephedra
- Hylotelephium ewersii
- Onobrychis
- Campylanthus ramosissimus (Plantaginaceae)
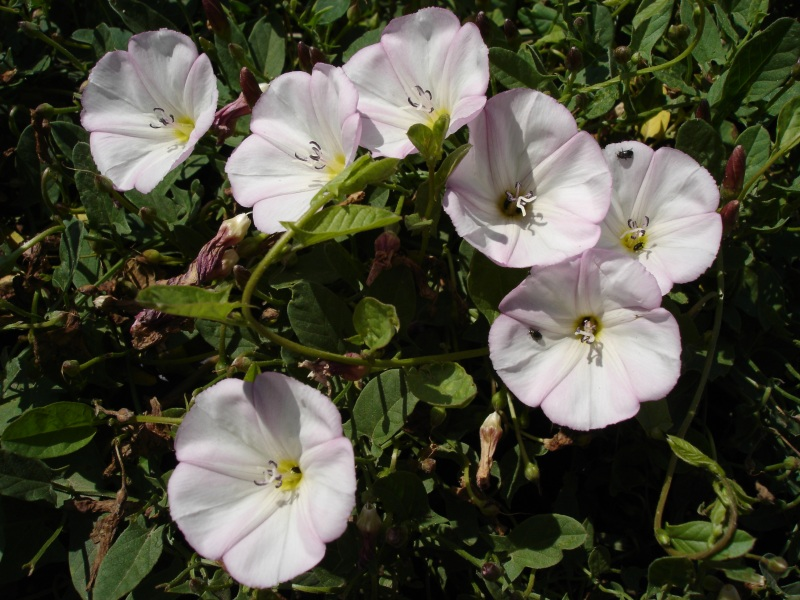
Convolvulus arvensis (Leli)

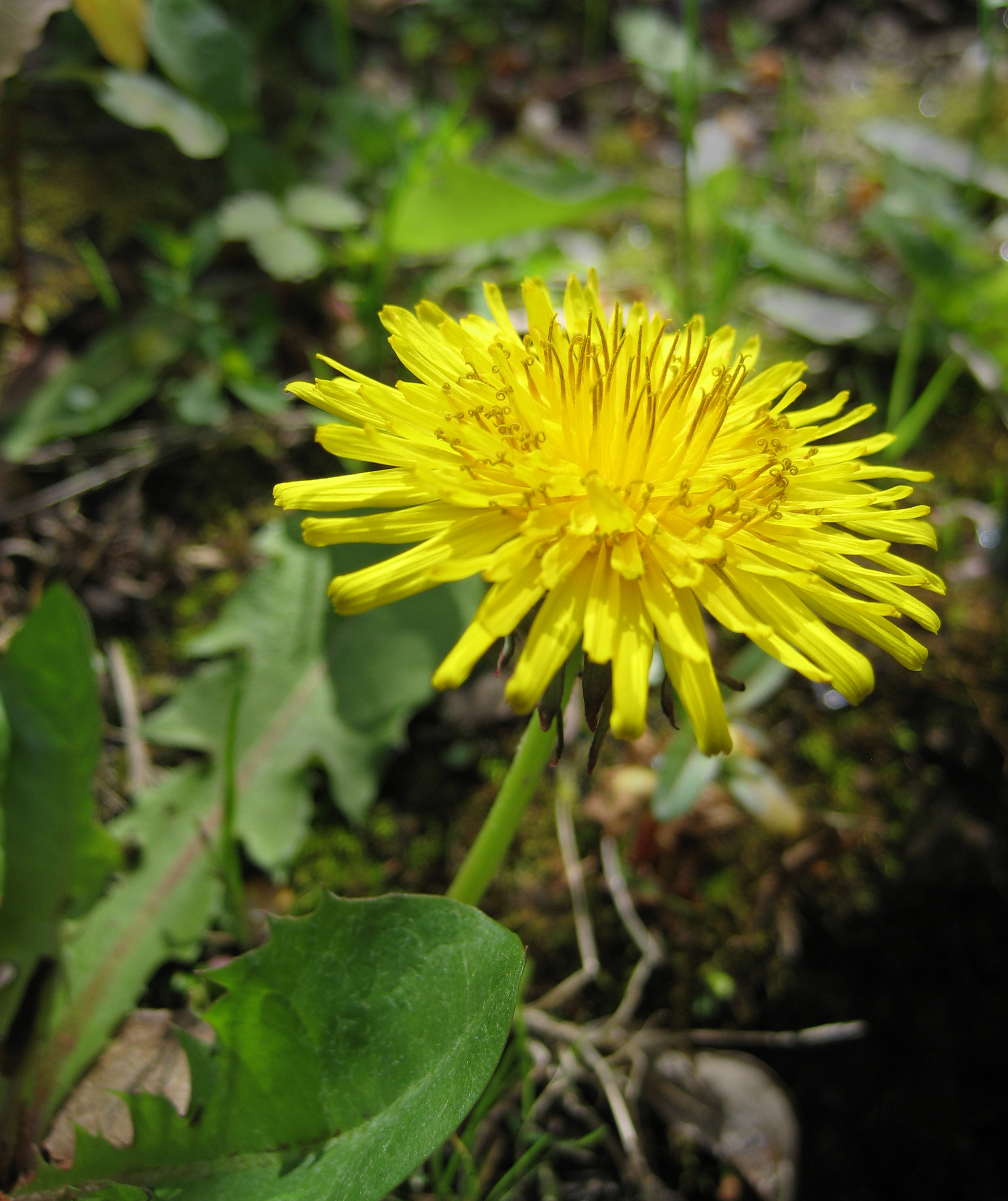
Dandelion

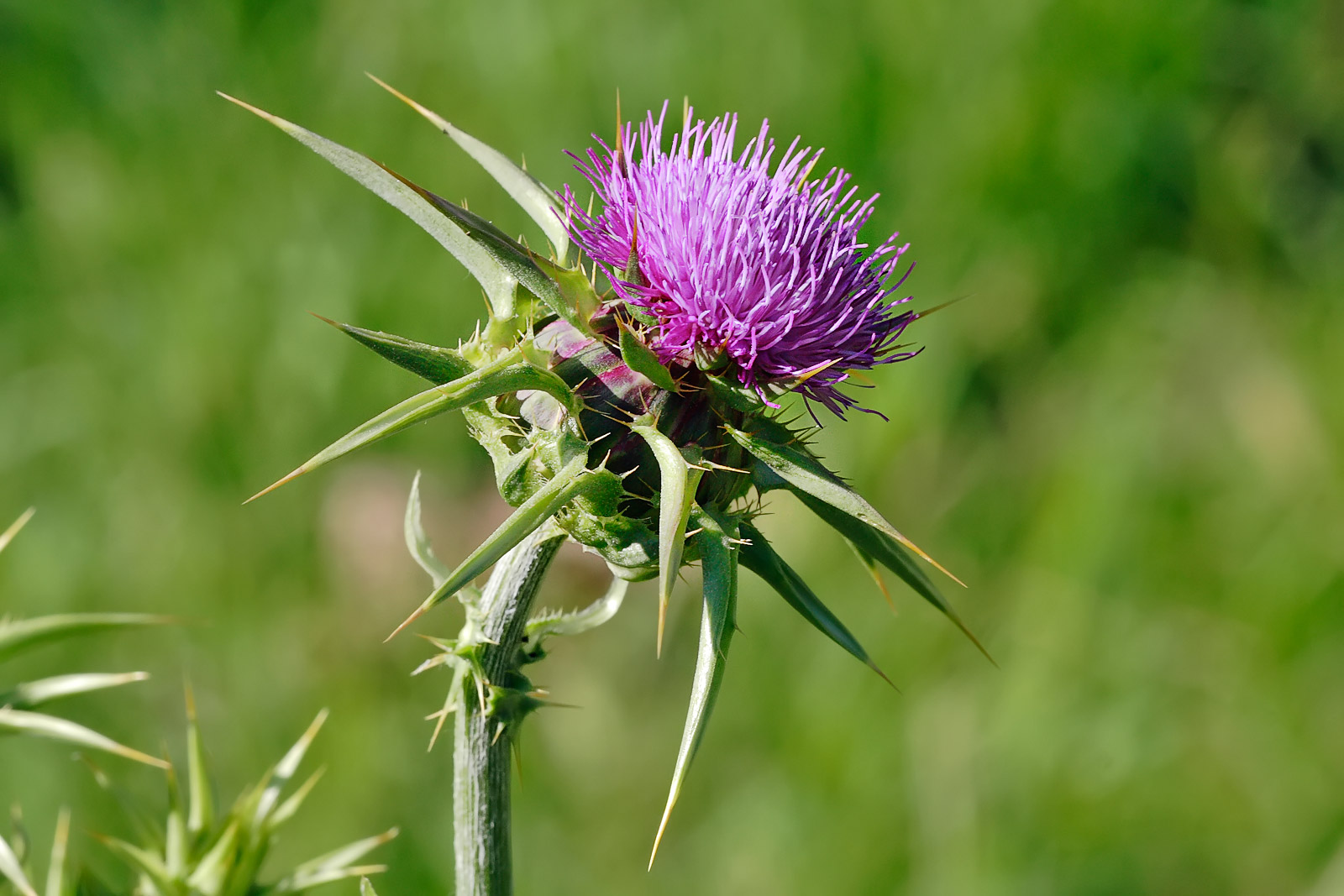
Milk thistle flowerhead

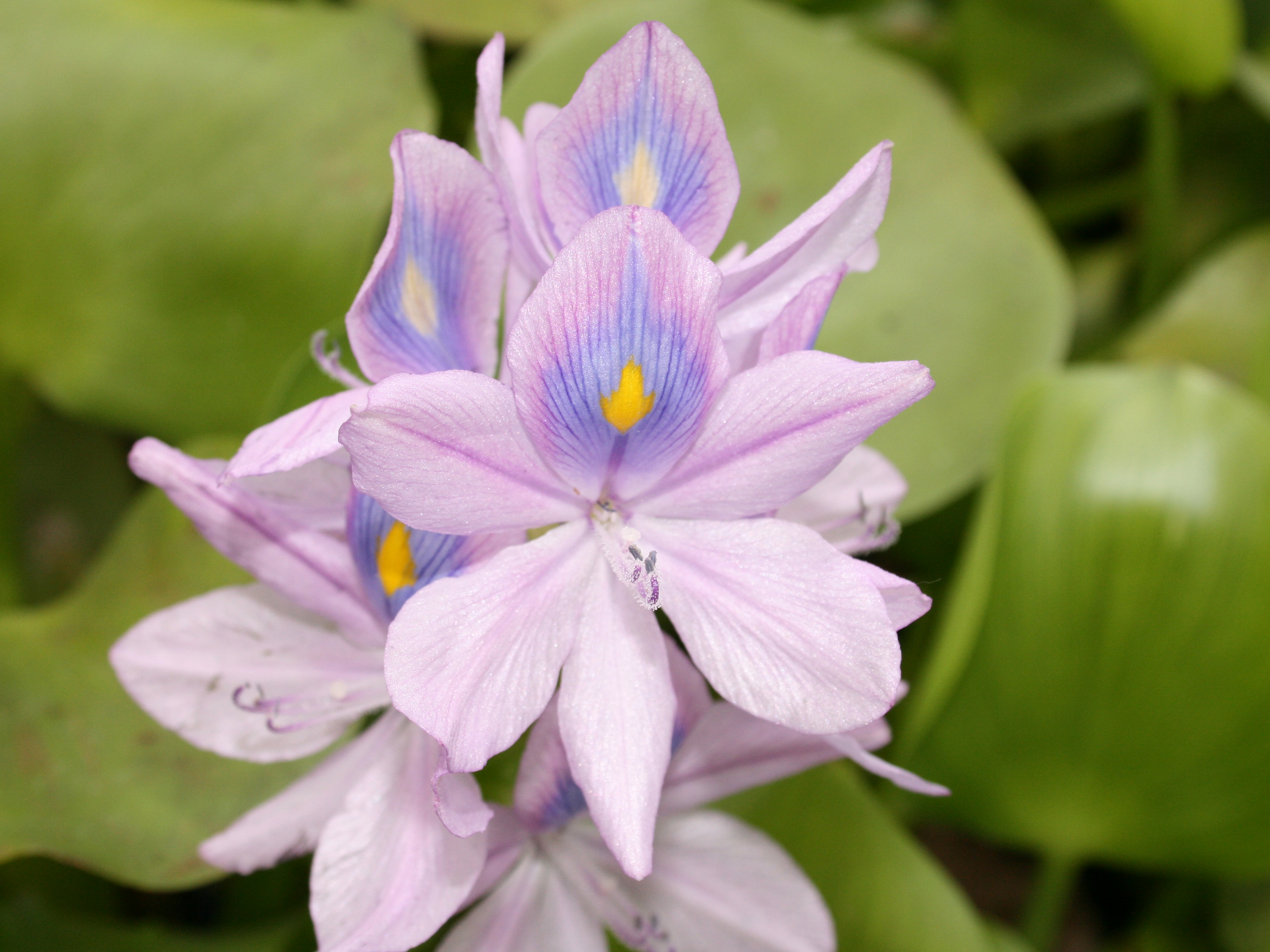
Common water hyacinth

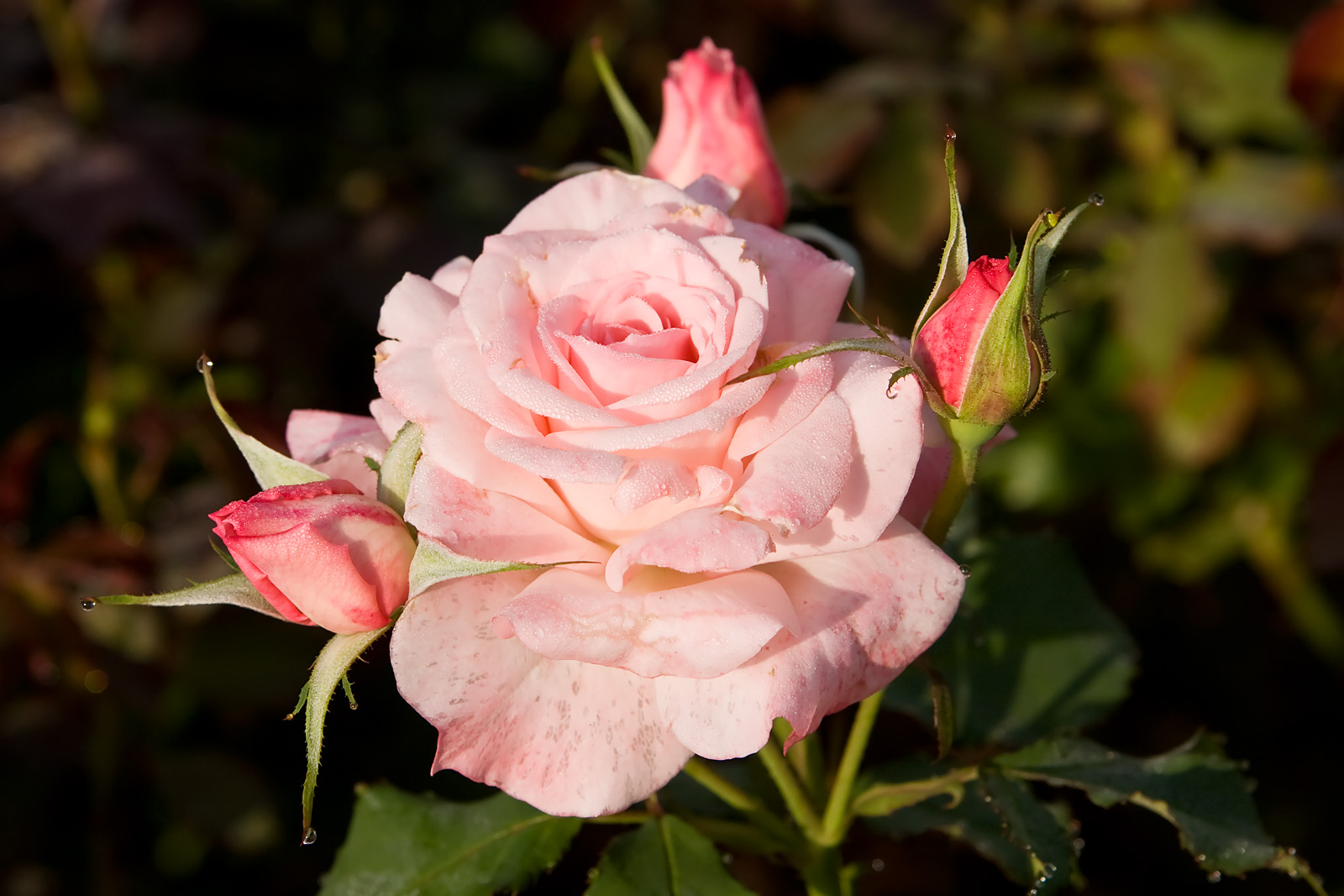
Roses

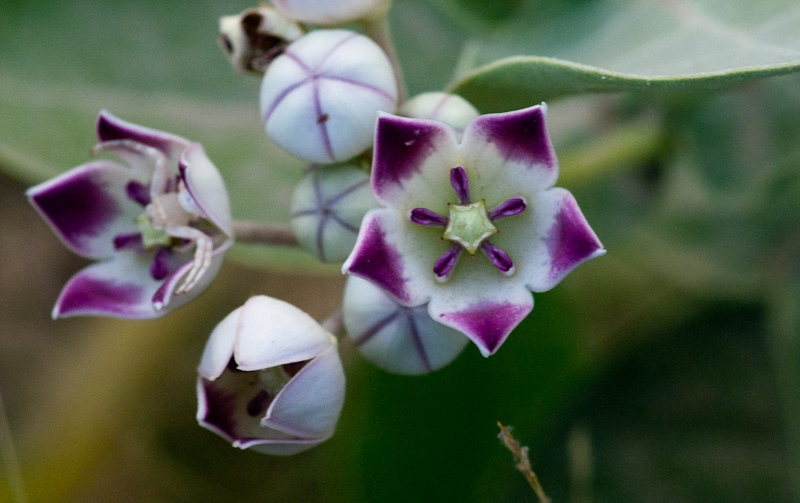
Calotropis procera

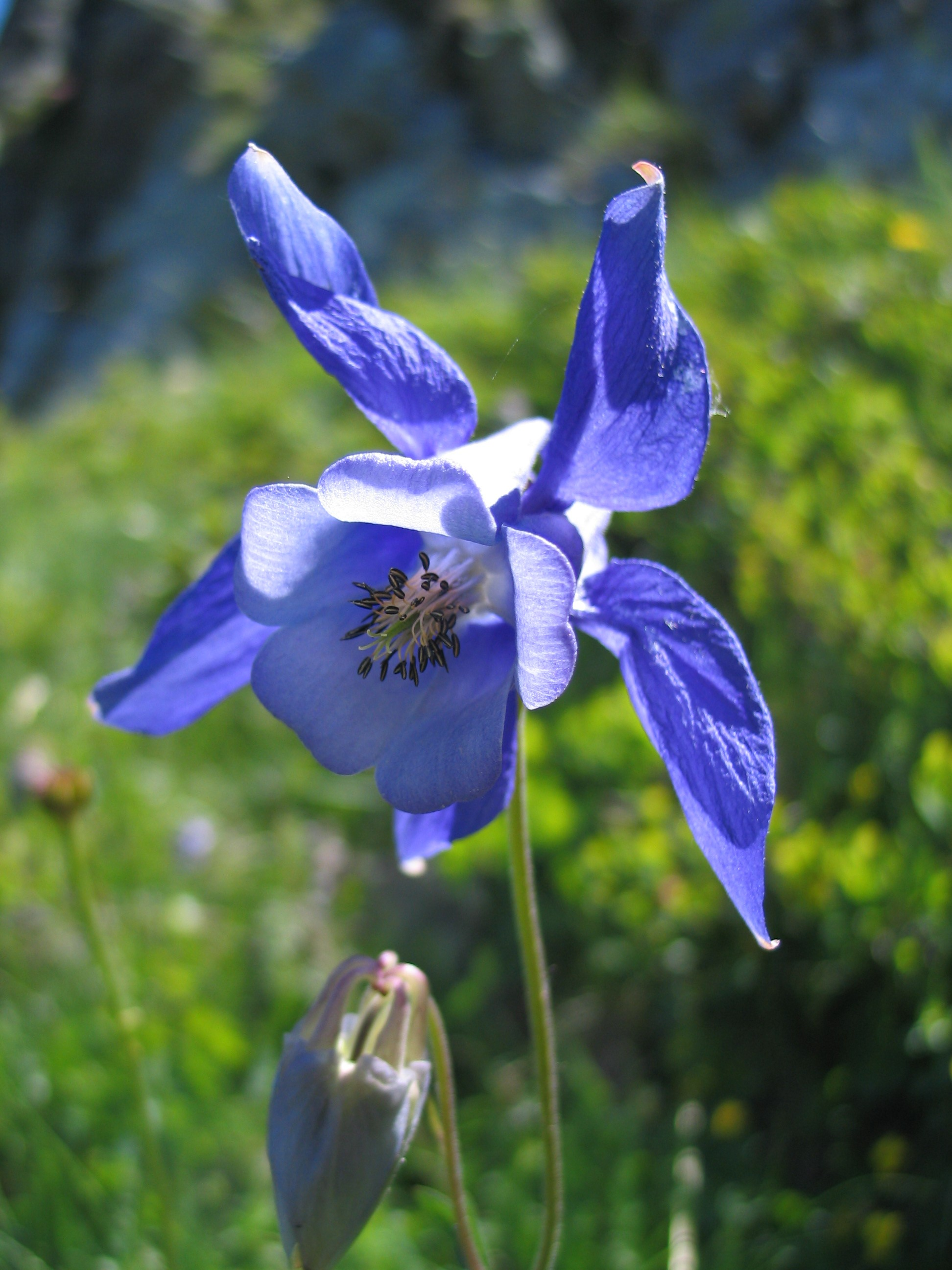
Aquilegia

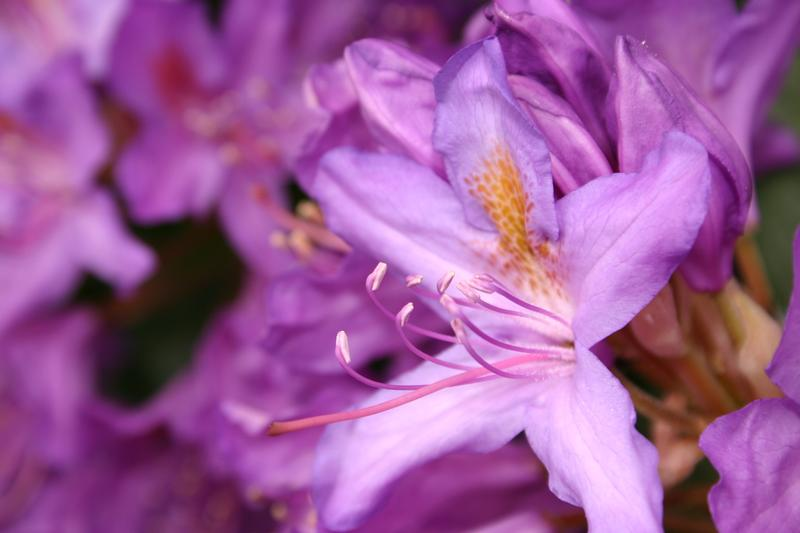
Rhododendron ponticum, state flower (AJK)

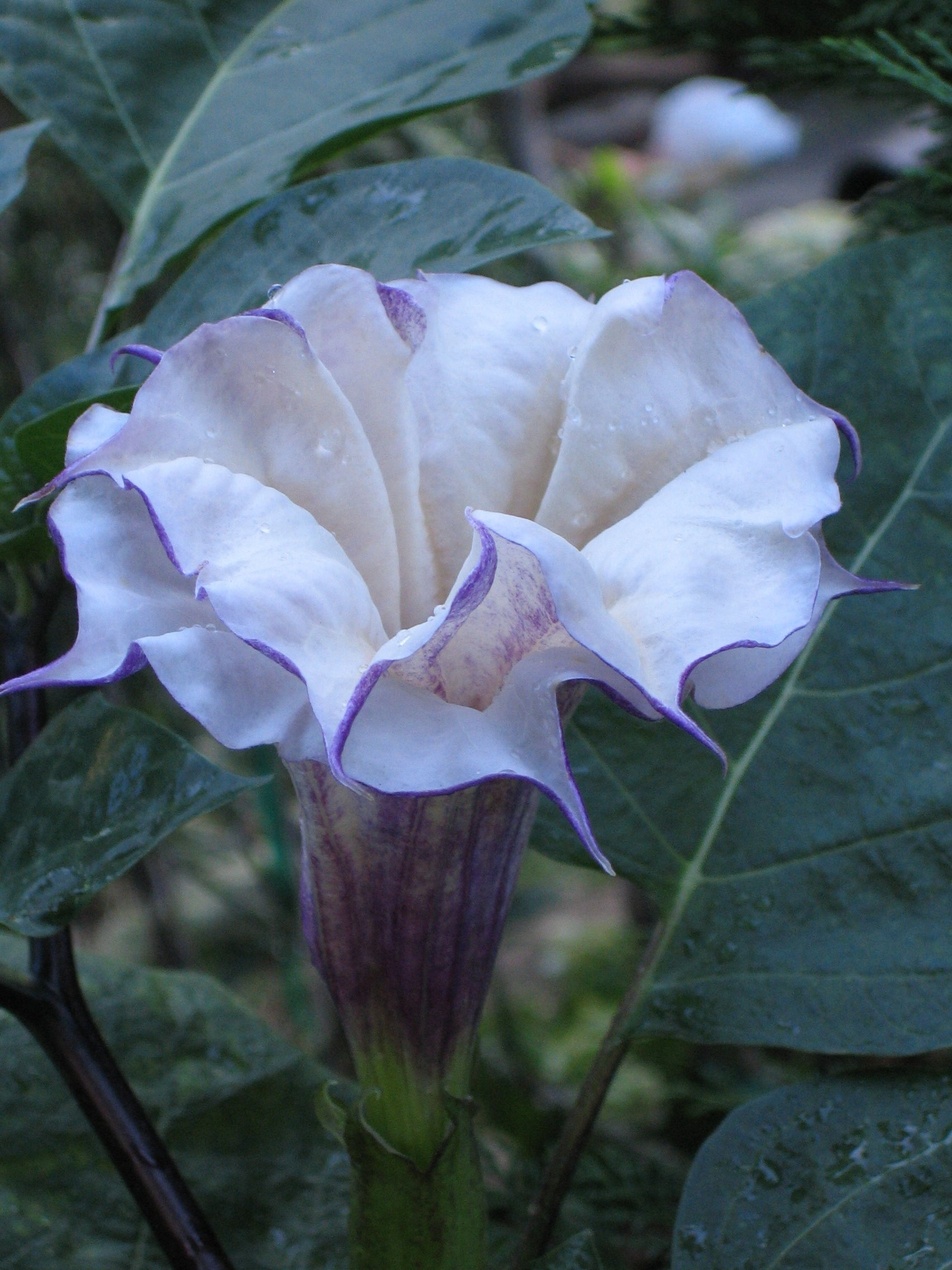
(Datura sp.)

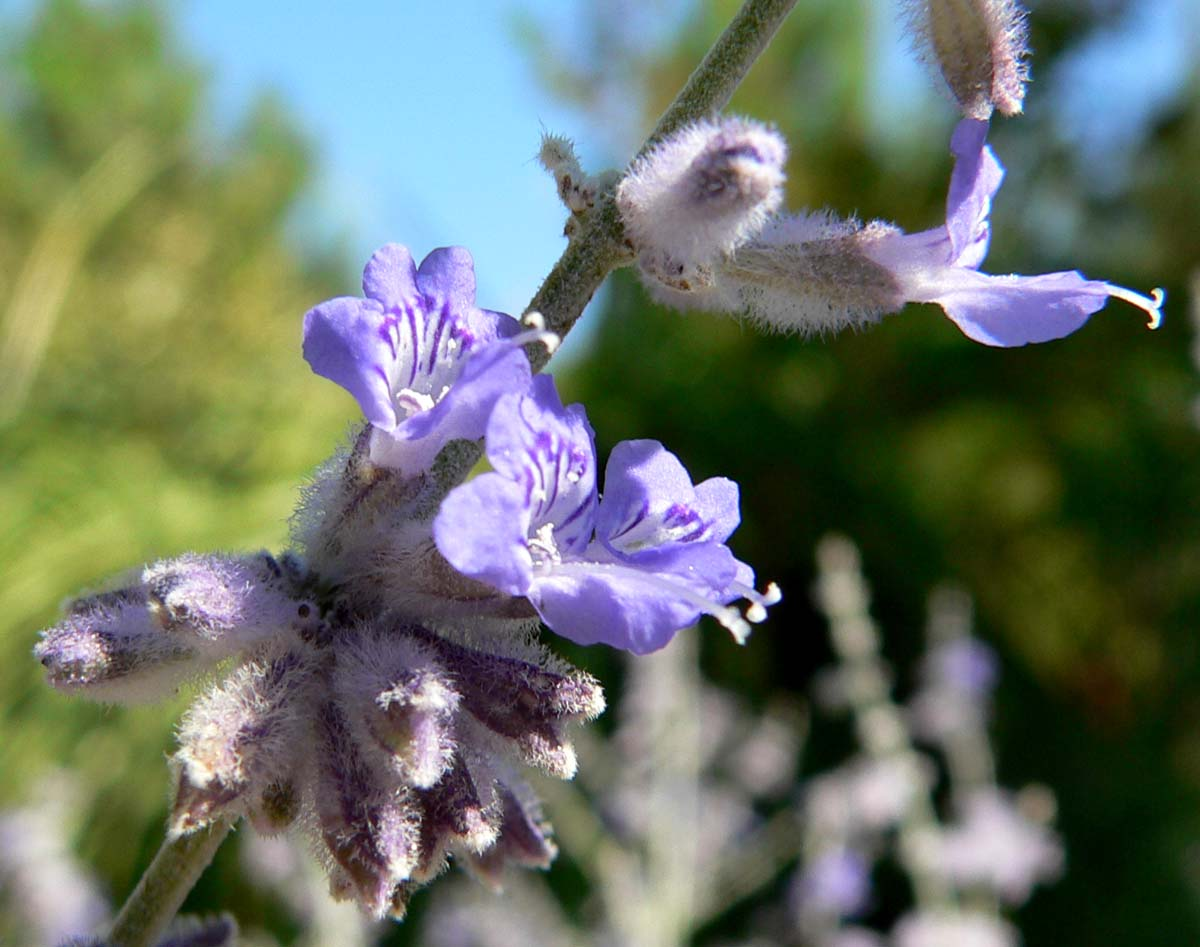
Perovskia atriplicifolia

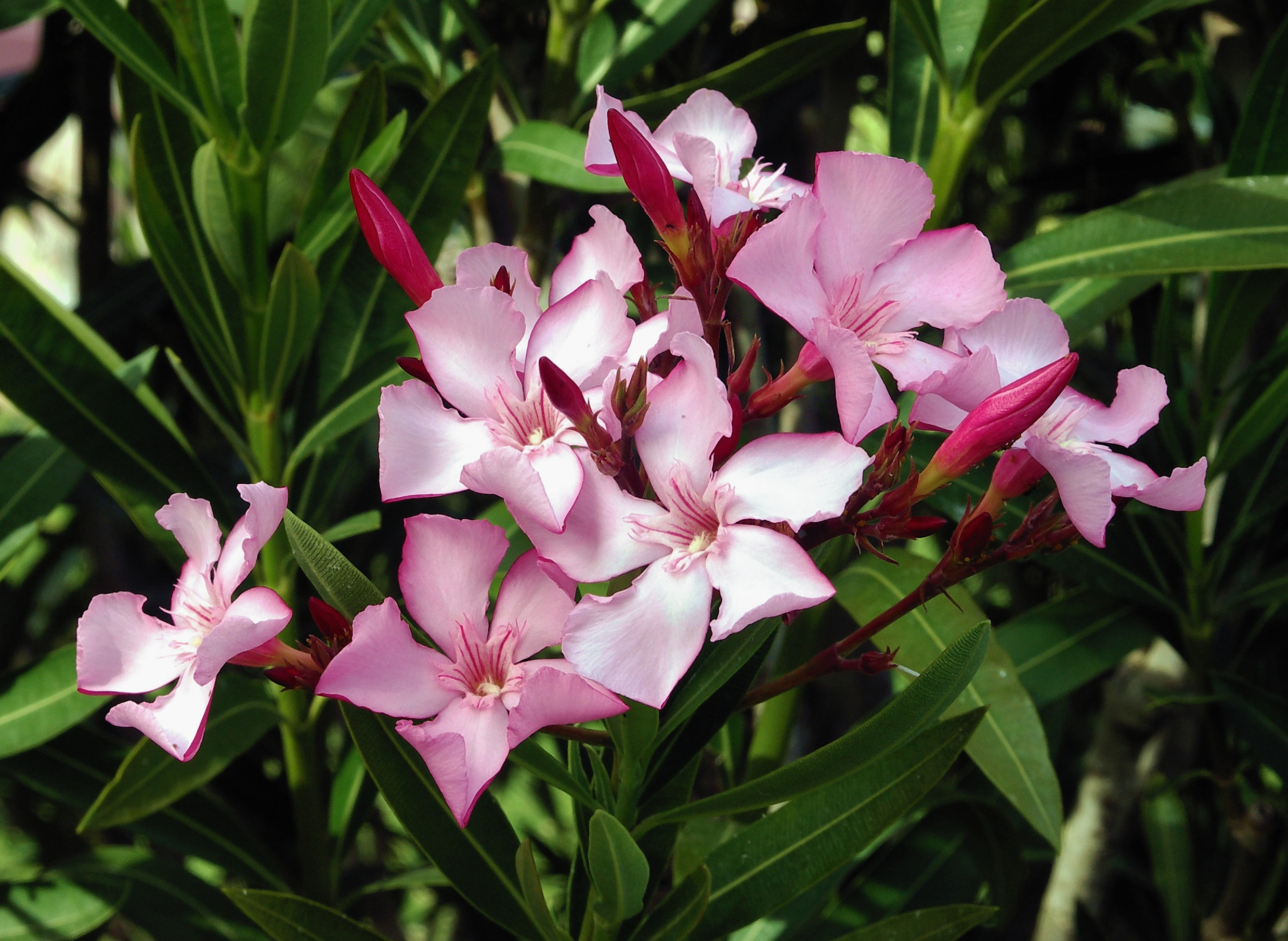
Nerium oleander

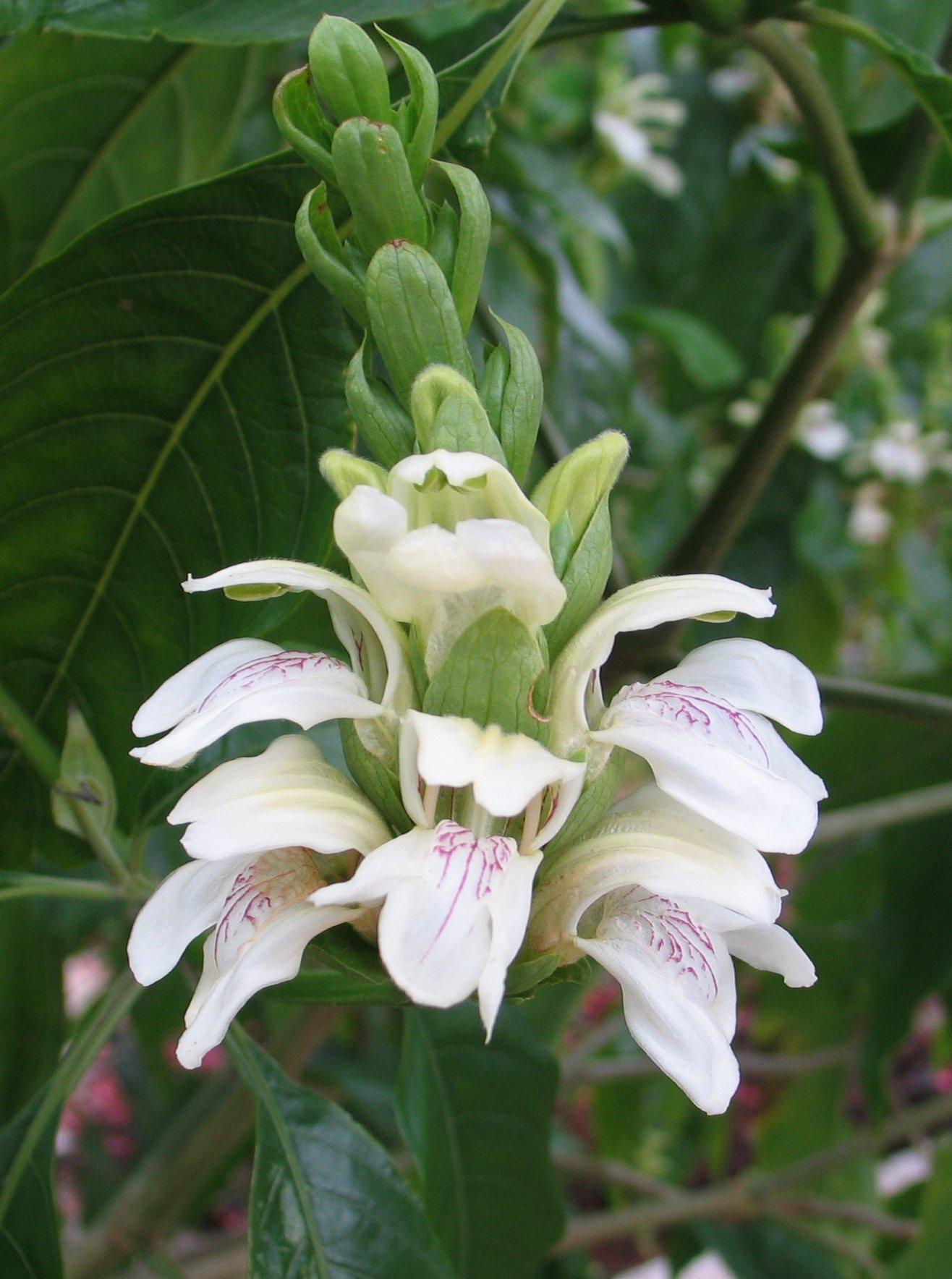
Justicia adhatoda

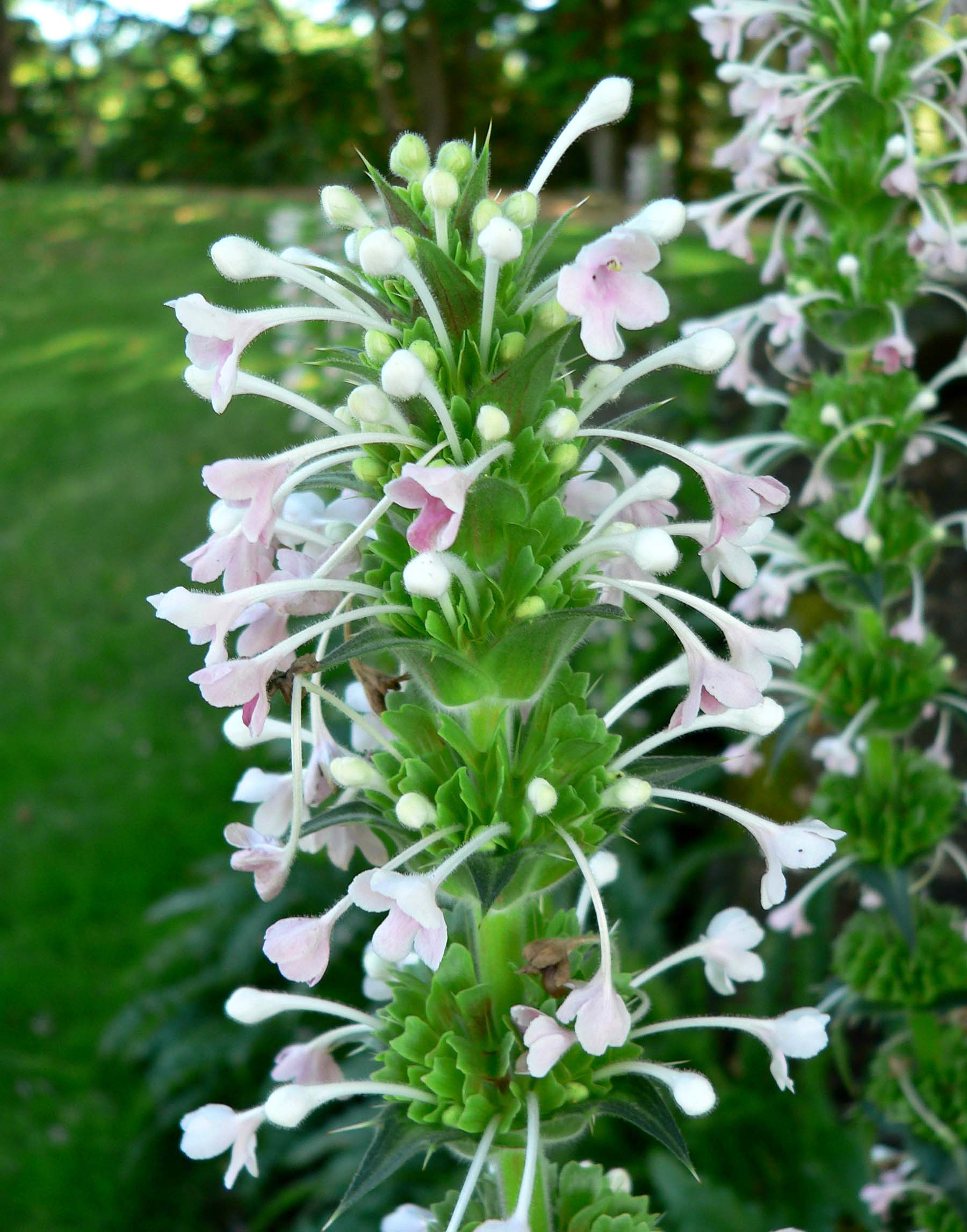
Morina

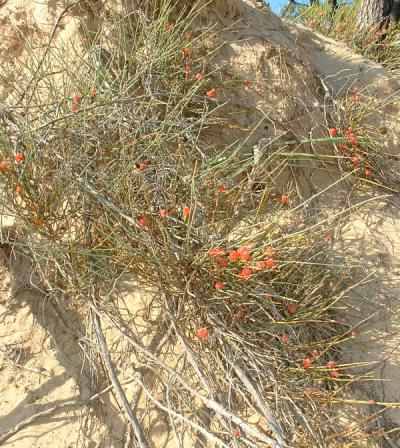
Ephedra

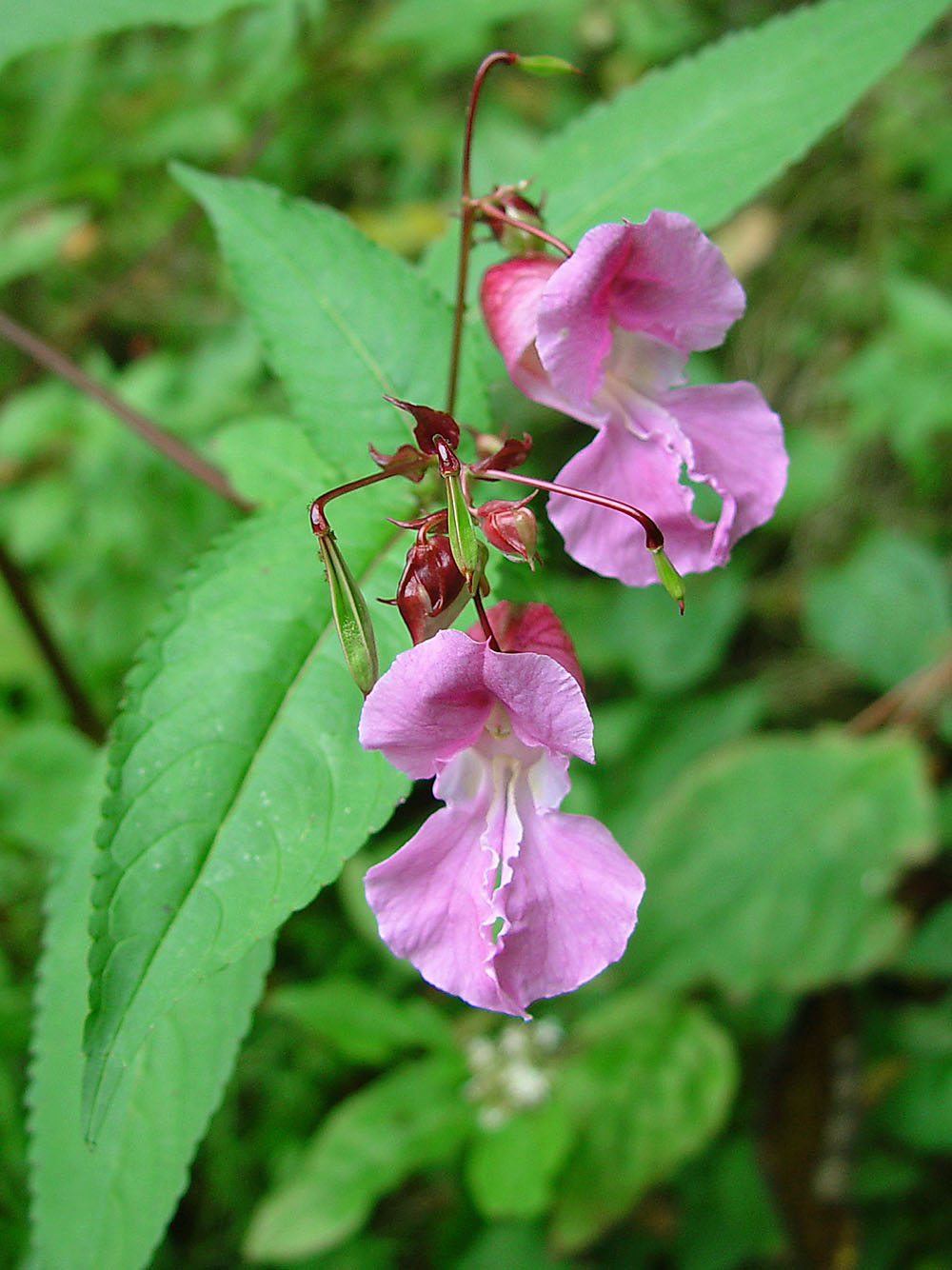
Impatiens glandulifera

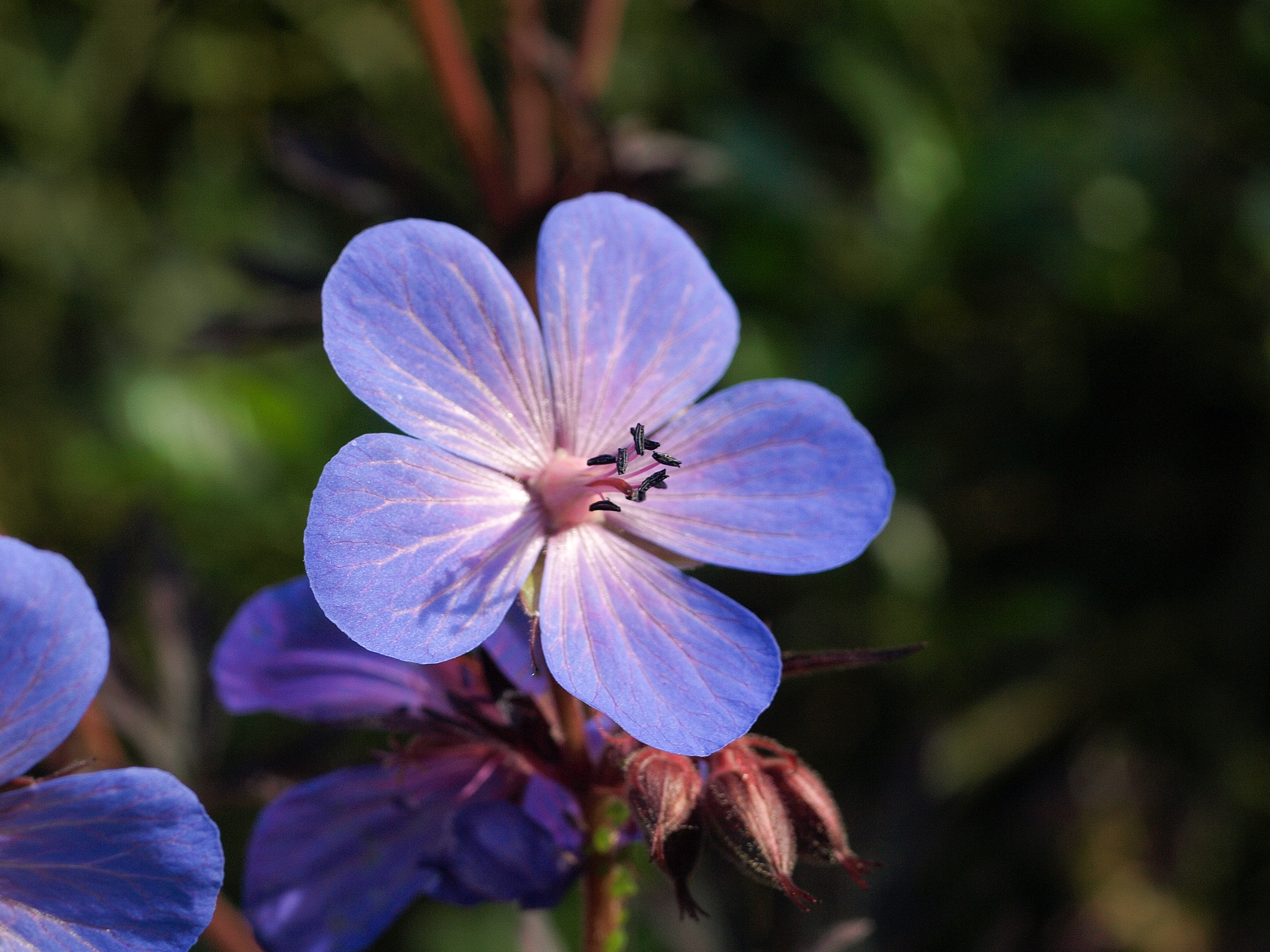
Himalayan cranesbill

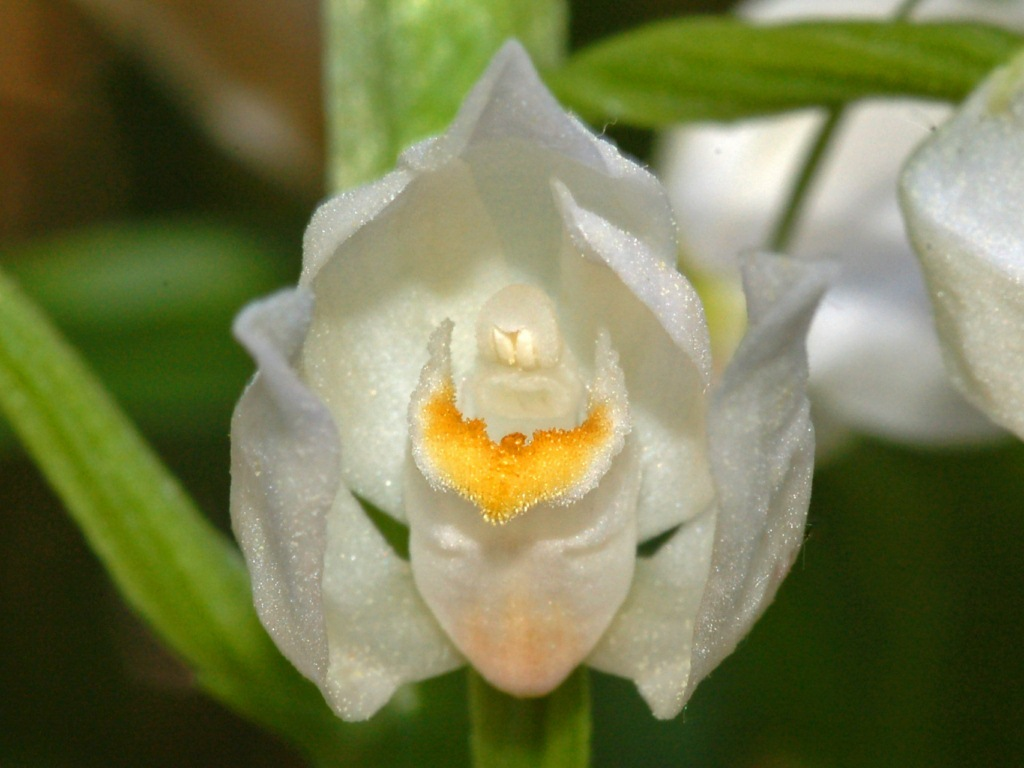
Cephalanthera sp.

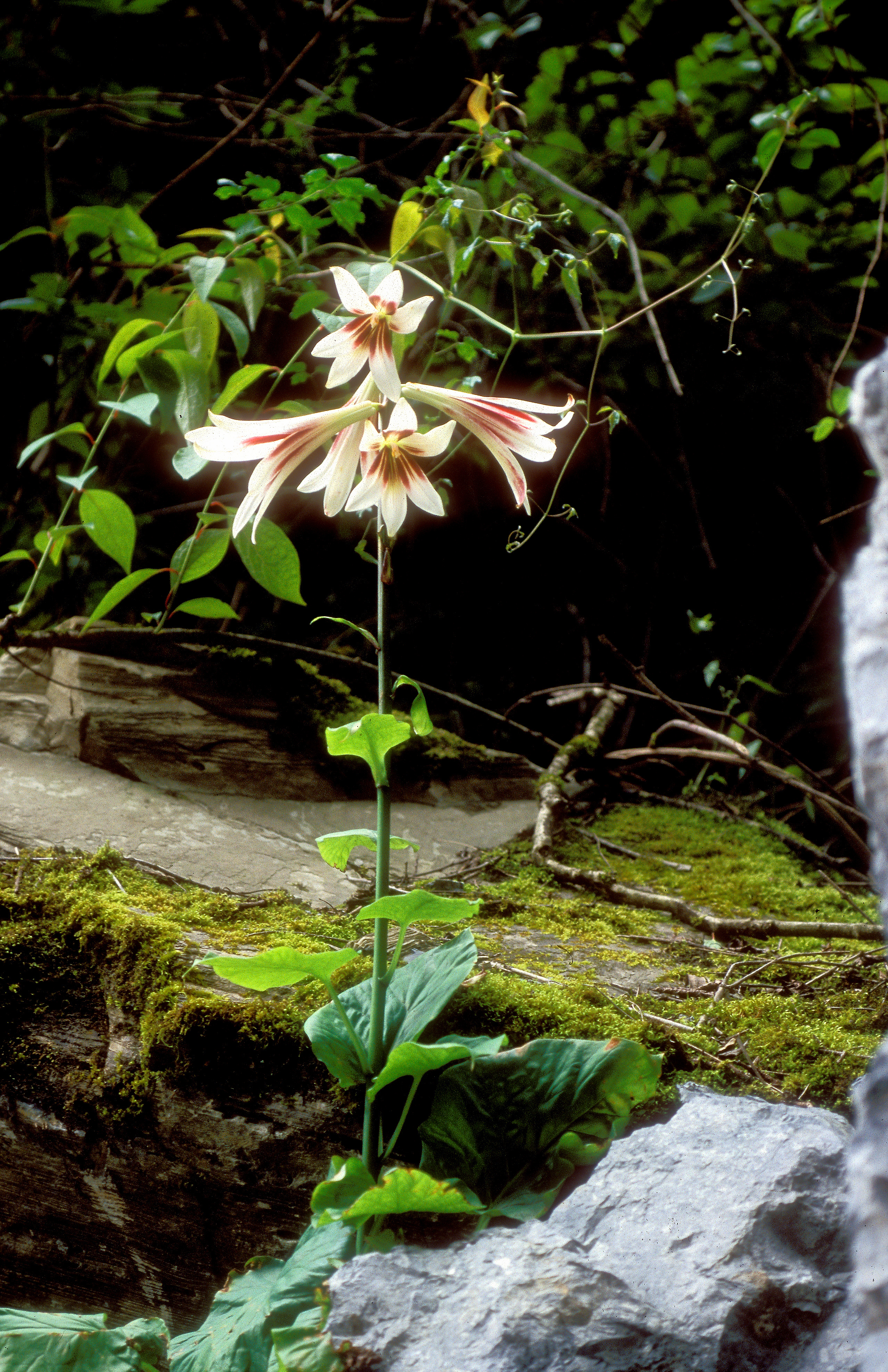
Giant Himalayan lily

== See also ==
- Wildflowers
- Wildlife of Pakistan
