= 1674 Ambon earthquake and megatsunami =

Earthquake and tsunami in Indonesia

- Location within Indonesia
- Local date: February 17, 1674
- Local time: 19:30 to 20:00 EIT
- Magnitude: M_{s} 6.8
- Depth: 40 km (25 mi)
- Epicenter: 3.750°S 127.750°E
- Areas affected: Banda Sea, Indonesia
- Tsunami: 100 m (330 ft)
- Casualties: 2,347 dead

The 1674 Ambon earthquake occurred on February 17 between 19:30 and 20:00 local time in the Maluku Islands. The resulting tsunami reached heights of up to 100 metres (330 ft) on Ambon Island killing over 2,000 people. It was the first detailed documentation of a tsunami in Indonesia and the largest ever recorded in the country. The exact fault which produced the earthquake has never been determined, but geologists postulate either a local fault, or a larger thrust fault offshore. The extreme tsunami was likely because of a submarine landslide.

== Overview ==
The tectonics of the North Maluku Islands is dominated by complex collision, subduction, and strike-slip elements. Intermediate to deep-focus earthquakes with a focal depth of 60 km or greater are immediately ruled out as the source because no known historical events of the same kind have generated a large tsunami. The 1938 Banda Sea earthquake, an intermediate depth magnitude 8.5 event only caused a minor tsunami.

The Seram Trough is a zone of complex convergence between the Pacific, Australian, Sunda, and numerous micro tectonic plates. This megathrust fault is located north of Seram Island. While it has generated large tsunamigenic earthquakes in the past such as that in 1899 and 1629, the fault is situated too far from Ambon to have caused huge tsunami run-ups.

Since the tsunami from the earthquake had an extreme run-up height of at least 100 metres (330 ft) observed locally on the northern shore of Ambon, researchers have dismissed the possibility of faulting as a source of the tsunami. Instead, an earthquake-generated landslide appears to be the likely source of the tsunami. However, the source of the earthquake has never been confirmed, but two faults, the South Seram Thrust and an unnamed fault on the island were the likely culprit. No magnitude has been assigned to the event in published research journals, but the BMKG and NGDC databases list the magnitude at 6.8 at a depth of 40 kilometres (25 mi).

== Documentation ==
In an account by Georg Eberhard Rumphius, a German botanist, the earthquake occurred on a Saturday evening, at 19:00 local time, when locals on the islands were celebrating the Chinese Lunar New Year. The bells of the nearby Victoria Castle on Ambon Island began to clang by themselves. The earthquake was so strong as to knock people off their balance. Seventy-five stone buildings reportedly collapsed, killing 79 Chinese and five Europeans and injuring 35 others. Most of the injuries were fractured arms and legs. Among the casualties in the collapses were European settlers. Water began sprouting up from wells and the ground, some spurted upwards to a height of 20 feet (6.1 m). Blue clay and sand also erupted from the ground. Many homes and roads on other parts of the island were cracked and severely damaged. Both Rumphius's wife and two daughters were killed during the earthquake after they were crushed by a falling wall. They were among the 31 Europeans who died in the earthquake and tsunami.

A large tsunami swept the island's coastline following the earthquake. On the Hitu peninsula, they were as high as 100 metres (330 ft), nearly topping the coastal hills. The tsunami was accompanied by a deafening noise; when it slammed into the coast, eyewitnesses described the flow as very dirty and foul smelling. It uprooted entire forests and plantations, washing them away. The northwestern coast of the Hitu Peninsula experienced the greatest wave force. At Seith and the adjacent villages of Loboleu and Wassela, the tsunami swept away many homes. More than 600 people died on nearby Lain Island. Waves some 80–100 m (260–330 ft) high reached the summit of the coastal ridges in this area, uprooting trees in the process. Some residents from Hahntuna, a village situated at higher elevation, visited the mosques in the lower-lying villages immediately after the earthquake and drowned when the tsunami arrived. At Hila, more than 1,400 people died, including all 31 members of a garrison assembled at Fort Amsterdam. Many buildings including the fort were destroyed by the surge while only two shacks survived. A section of the coast from Hila extending towards Seith containing three villages also slumped into the sea.

East of the fort, at Sinola, three waves flooded the coastal plantations. The first wave was described as a calm ebb flow and flood while the second and third waves stripped away the vegetation and buildings. At Hitu Lama, where the sea rose 3 m (9.8 ft) above normal level, 35 villagers and 1 soldier died. Forty homes were destroyed at nearby Mamala, while some villages on the northeast coast of the island such as Liang and Tulehu only reported limited tsunami damage. At Larike, three episodes of rising sea level was observed and damage was minor. The island of Itelam supposedly disappeared after the earthquake and tsunami, replaced by 110 m (360 ft) deep water. The tsunami also inundated parts of the coast on Ceram Island. At Loki, the flood rose 5.5 m (18 ft) destroying buildings and homes although there were no deaths. At Cape Kaula, the tsunami carried the homes of the East India Company employees further inland. On Kelang Island, a 5 m (16 ft) flood was measured.

== See also ==
- 1852 Banda Sea earthquake
- List of earthquakes in Indonesia
- List of historical earthquakes
- List of tsunamis
