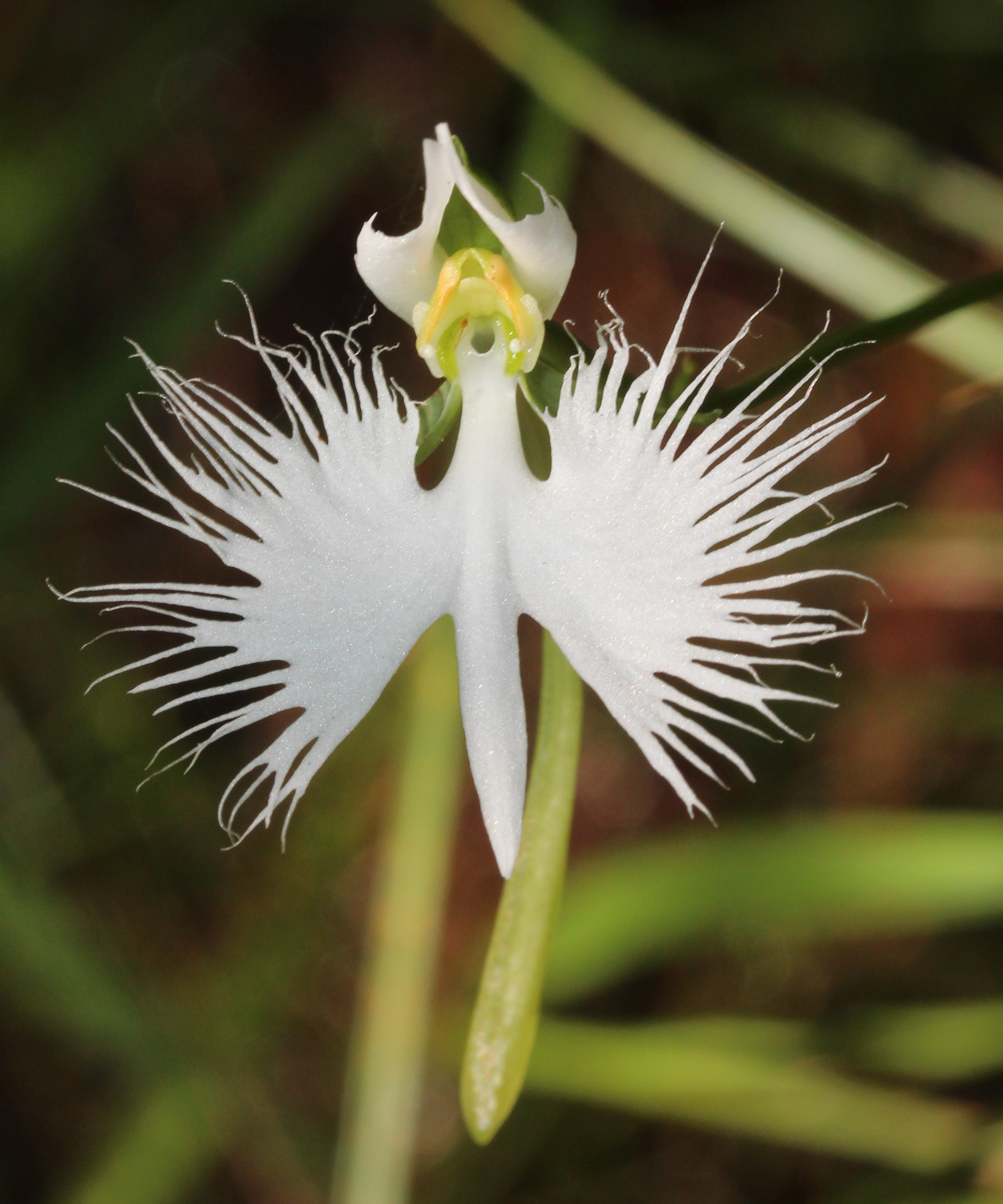
- Pecteilis radiata

Scientific classification
- Kingdom: Plantae
- Clade: Tracheophytes
- Clade: Angiosperms
- Clade: Monocots
- Order: Asparagales
- Family: Orchidaceae
- Subfamily: Orchidoideae
- Tribe: Orchideae
- Subtribe: Orchidinae
- Genus: Pecteilis; Raf.

Type species
- Pecteilis susannae

Synonyms
- Hemihabenaria Finet; Parhabenaria Gagnep.

= Pecteilis =

Genus of orchids

Pecteilis is a genus of flowering plants from the orchid family, Orchidaceae. It is widespread across eastern and southern Asia including the Russian Far East, China, Japan, India, Pakistan, Indochina, and Indonesia.

== Species ==
Image	Scientific name	Distribution	Elevation (m)
	Pecteilis cambodiana (Gagnep.) Aver.	Cambodia, Vietnam	
	Pecteilis cochinchinensis (Gagnep.) Aver.	Vietnam	
	Pecteilis gigantea (Sm.) Raf.	India, Pakistan, Himalayas, Nepal, Bhutan, Myanmar	2,200 metres (7,200 ft)
	Pecteilis hawkesiana (King & Pantl.) C.S.Kumar	Myanmar, Thailand	125–800 metres (410–2,625 ft)
	Pecteilis henryi Schltr.	Yunnan, Himalayas, Assam, India, Indochina	670–1,900 metres (2,200–6,230 ft)
	Pecteilis korigadensis Jalal & Jayanthi	India (Maharashtra)	640 metres (2,100 ft)
	Pecteilis ophiocephala (W.W.Sm.) Ormerod	Myanmar, China (Yunnan)	
	Pecteilis radiata (Thunb.) Raf.	Primorye, Henan, Japan, Korea	1,500 metres (4,900 ft)
	Pecteilis susannae (L.) Raf.	Fujian, Guangdong, Guangxi, Guizhou, Hainan, Jiangxi, Sichuan, Yunnan, Cambodia, India, Indonesia, Laos, Malaysia, Myanmar, Nepal, Thailand, Vietnam	350–2,500 metres (1,150–8,200 ft)
	Pecteilis triflora (D.Don) Tang & F.T.Wang	Bangladesh, India, Nepal	400–1,500 metres (1,300–4,900 ft)

== See also ==
- List of Orchidaceae genera
