= Sergei Arsenjevic Nevski =

The standard author abbreviation Nevski is used to indicate this person as the author when citing a botanical name.
