= Johannes Camphuys =

Dutch colonial governor (1634–1695)

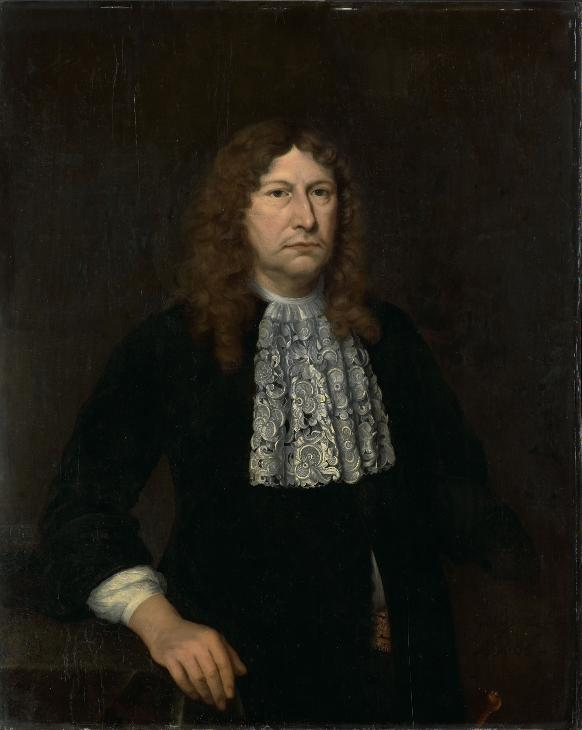
- Portrait of Johannes Campuys by Gerrit van Goor, 1685

Governor-General of the Dutch East Indies
- In office 11 January 1684 – 24 September 1691
- Preceded by: Cornelis Speelman
- Succeeded by: Willem van Outhoorn

Personal details
- Born: 18 July 1634 Haarlem, Dutch Republic
- Died: 18 July 1695 (aged 61) Batavia, Dutch East Indies (present-day Indonesia)

Johannes Camphuys (registered as Kamphuis in the Centraal Bureau voor Genealogie) (18 July 1634 – 18 July 1695) was the Governor-General of the Dutch East Indies from 1684 to 1691. Camphuys was born in Haarlem, in the Republic of the United Netherlands.

== Biography ==
Joannes Camphuys was born in Haarlem on 18 July 1634. In his youth he was a student at a silversmith in Amsterdam. He left on 1 November 1652 aboard the cargo carrier to India. The ship, however, suffered shipwreck on 2 March 1653 at the Shetland Islands. Camphuys survived the disaster and left on 23 August 1653 aboard the Golded Dragon. He became a clerk at the General Secretariat in Batavia and a bailiff in Batavia. After 11 years at the secretary he became a merchant. He became a commander in 1670 and in 1671 he left as head of the VOC post in Deshima, Japan. This function was usually only carried out by government officials. After a year, as usual for that position, he returned and held the function another 2 times (in 1673 and 1675) alternated with the membership of the Council of Justice. In 1677 he became Secretary of the High Government and president of the orphan's college. He conducted negotiations with the ambassadors of Bantam. In 1678 he became Council-Extra-Oranginary of India. In 1681, he became a member of the Council of the Dutch East Indies.

On 11 January 1684 Joannes Camphuys was appointed by the Council of the Dutch East Indies as successor to Cornelis Speelman as Governor-General, initially as provisional Governor-General until the Lord XVII approved the appointment. Because a number of people felt passable in the appointment, his understanding with the council was not optimal. He was sometimes absent and even did not decide if he did not agree with that. But the Lord XVII was on his hand and so he could go his way. Under his rule there was peace in the archipelago. On 17 December 1690 he resigned on his own repeated request. He handed over the landlord's office to Willem van Outhoorn on 24 September 1691.

He has been living alternately at Batavia, and since his farewell as Governor-General, Edam, donated to him on the coast of Batavia, where he had built a house to Japanese model and gathered animals from all parts of the Indies. He had written contact with Rumphius on Ambon. He died exactly on his 61st birthday in 1695. He was buried in the Dutch church in Batavia.

Camphuys, although righteous, was not a powerful driver. His governance was not characterized by important events. Noteworthy are the Soerapati uprising on Java and the tract with Bantam of 17 April 1684. He failed to address corruption among officials. However, he had a lot of interest in science and he supported them wherever possible and also wrote a dissertation on the foundation of Batavia included in François Valentine's standard work, Old and New East Indies.

== Travels ==
At this point in Japanese history, the sole VOC outpost (or "factory") was situated on Dejima island in the harbor of Nagasaki on the southern island of Kyushu. Camphuys was three times sent to Japan as Opperhoofd or chief negotiant and officer of the VOC trading post.

- 22 October 1671 – 12 November 1672
- 29 October 1673 – 19 October 1674
- 7 November 1675 – 27 October 1676

== Legacy ==
Camphuys died in Batavia (Jakarta). He is commemorated in the name of a street in the Lombok neighbourhood of Utrecht; and he is also remembered in the name of a street in the Bezuidenhoutquarter of The Hague.

== See also ==
- VOC Opperhoofden in Japan

== Notes ==
Preceded by Martinus Caesar	VOC Opperhoofden at Dejima; 1671–1672	Succeeded by Martinus Caesar
Preceded by Martinus Caesar	VOC Opperhoofden at Dejima; 1673–1674	Succeeded by Martinus Caesar
Preceded by Martinus Caesar	VOC Opperhoofden at Dejima; 1675–1676	Succeeded by Dirck de Haze
