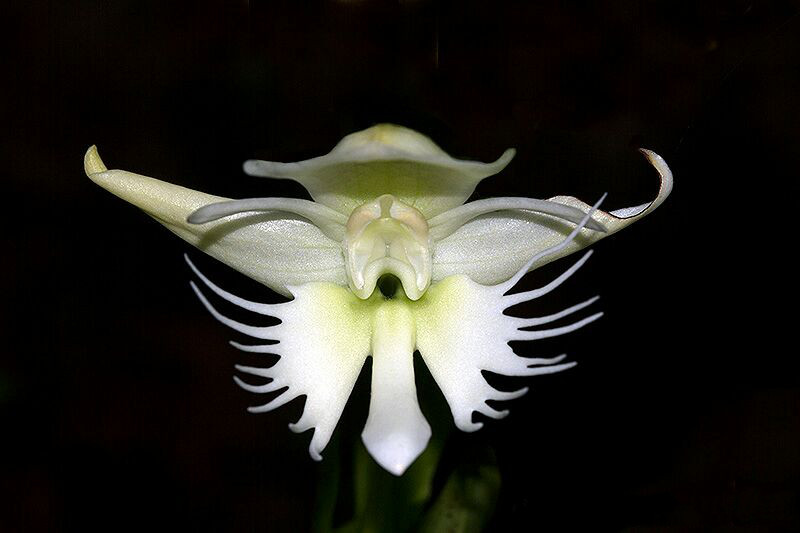

Scientific classification
- Kingdom: Plantae
- Clade: Tracheophytes
- Clade: Angiosperms
- Clade: Monocots
- Order: Asparagales
- Family: Orchidaceae
- Subfamily: Orchidoideae
- Genus: Pecteilis
- Species: P. gigantea

Binomial name
- Pecteilis gigantea (Sm.) Raf.

Synonyms
- Habenaria susannae; Habenaria gigantea; Orchis gigantea; Platanthera gigantea

= Pecteilis gigantea =

Butterfly orchid or Lady Susan's orchid

Species of orchid

Pecteilis gigantea is fragrant orchid species found in hilly evergreen forests in India at height 1800 ft. above sea level, and also extending up the Western Himalayas into Pakistan.
