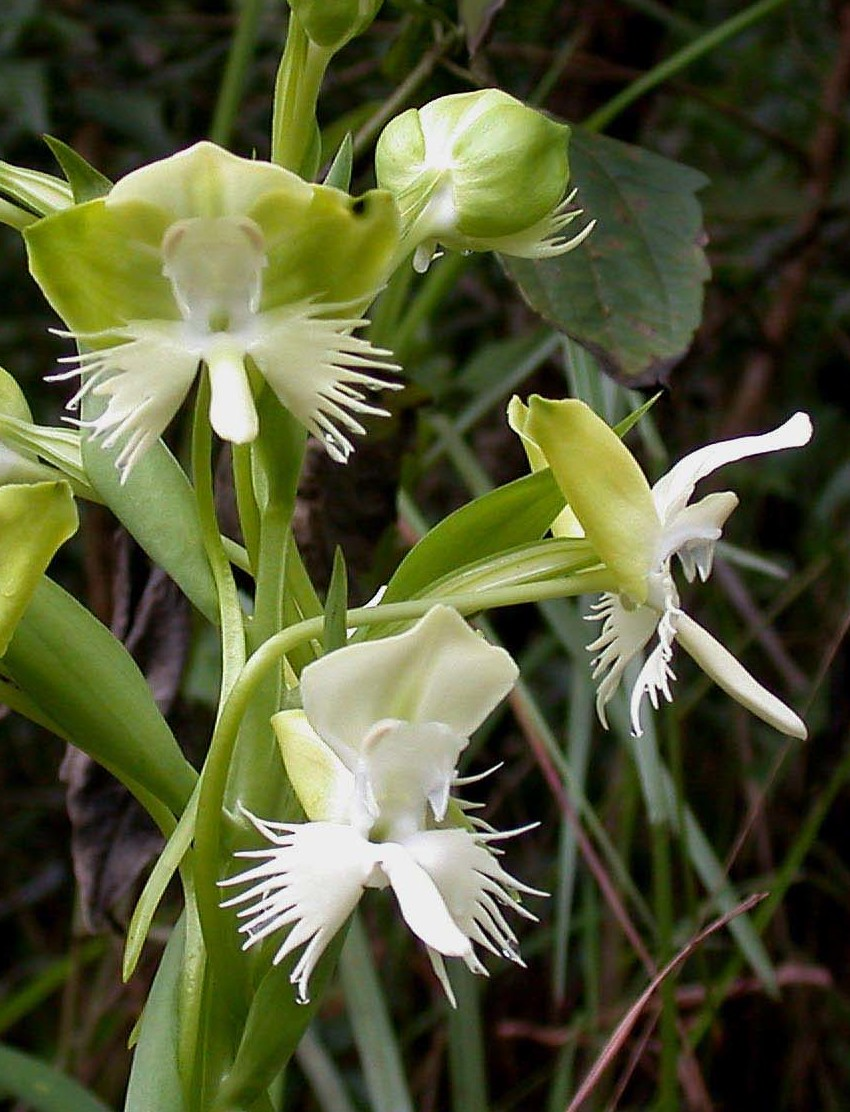

Scientific classification
- Kingdom: Plantae
- Clade: Tracheophytes
- Clade: Angiosperms
- Clade: Monocots
- Order: Asparagales
- Family: Orchidaceae
- Subfamily: Orchidoideae
- Genus: Pecteilis
- Species: P. susannae

Binomial name
- Pecteilis susannae (L.) Raf.

Synonyms
- Platanthera susannae (L) Lindl. Platanthera robusta Lindl. Orchis susannae L Hemihabenaria susannae (L) Finet; Habenaria susannae (L) R.Br. ex Blow up.

= Pecteilis susannae =

Species of orchid

Pecteilis susannae is a species of orchid in the Pecteilis genus. It is commonly known as the Lady Susan's orchid.
