= Larike =

- Location within Indonesia
- Coordinates: 3°45′S 127°56′E
- Country: Indonesia
- Province: Maluku
- Regency: Central Maluku
- District: Leihitu Barat

Area
  - Total: 6,091.652 km^{2} (2,352.000 sq mi)
  - Land: 2,352 km^{2} (908 sq mi)

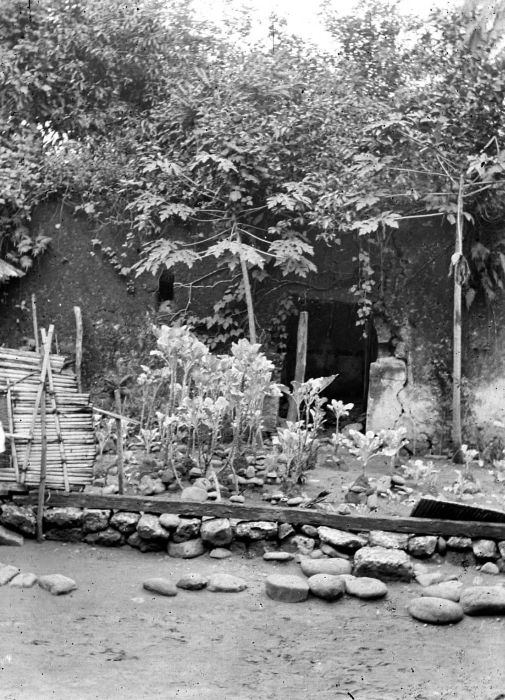
Overgrown ruin of the fort at Lariké

Larike (Indonesian pronunciation: [laˈrike]) is a village in district Leihitu Barat. Regency Maluki, Maluku province, Indonesia. Linked postal code is 97581.
