= Streptomyces sedi =

Scientific classification
- Domain: Bacteria
- Kingdom: Bacillati
- Phylum: Actinomycetota
- Class: Actinomycetes
- Order: Streptomycetales
- Family: Streptomycetaceae
- Genus: Streptomyces
- Species: S. sedi

Binomial name
- Streptomyces sedi Li et al. 2009

Type strain
- CCTCC AA 208020, DSM 41942, JCM 16909, YIM 65188

Species of bacterium

Streptomyces sedi is a bacterium species from the genus of Streptomyces which has been isolated from tissues from the plant Sedum in the Yunnan province in China.

== See also ==
- List of Streptomyces species
