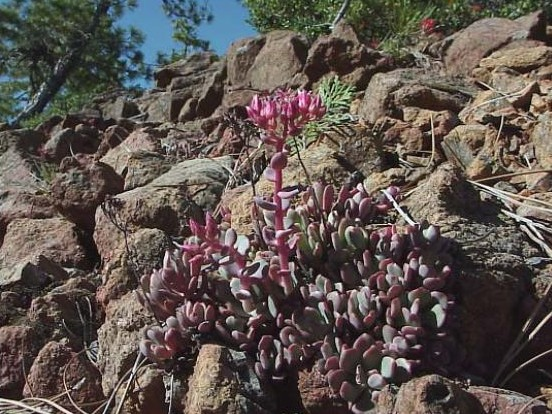

Conservation status
- Critically Imperiled (NatureServe)

Scientific classification
- Kingdom: Plantae
- Clade: Embryophytes
- Clade: Tracheophytes
- Clade: Angiosperms
- Clade: Eudicots
- Order: Saxifragales
- Family: Crassulaceae
- Genus: Sedum
- Species: S. eastwoodiae

Binomial name
- Sedum eastwoodiae (Britton) A.Berger

Synonyms
- Cotyledon mendocinoana Fedde; Gormania eastwoodiae Britton; Sedum laxum var. eastwoodiae (Britton) H.Ohba; Sedum laxum subsp. eastwoodiae (Britton) R.T.Clausen

= Sedum eastwoodiae =

Species of flowering plant

Sedum eastwoodiae is a rare species of flowering plant of the stonecrop Crassulaceae family. It is known by its common name Red Mountain stonecrop. It is endemic to Mendocino County, California, where it is known from only four occurrences on Red Mountain, near Ukiah. The total number of plants in existence is estimated to be around 5,300. They can be found on steep, exposed, rocky mountain slopes of serpentine substrate. This species has also been treated as a subspecies of Sedum laxum.

== Description ==
Sedum eastwoodiae is a small perennial succulent plant forming basal rosettes a few centimeters wide. The leaves are 1 to 3 centimeters (0.4 to 1.2 in) long with the widest part near the distal end, then narrowing to a rounded or slightly notched tip. Smaller leaves occur higher up the stem. The foliage is blue-green in color, blushing reddish. The inflorescence is a spreading or flat-topped array of many small, star-shaped flowers with red or pink petals up to a centimeter long each, and stamens with red or purplish anthers.

== Habitat ==
This species is known from a small section of habitat on a single mountain where the main potential threat to its existence is mining for nickel, chromium, and cobalt.
