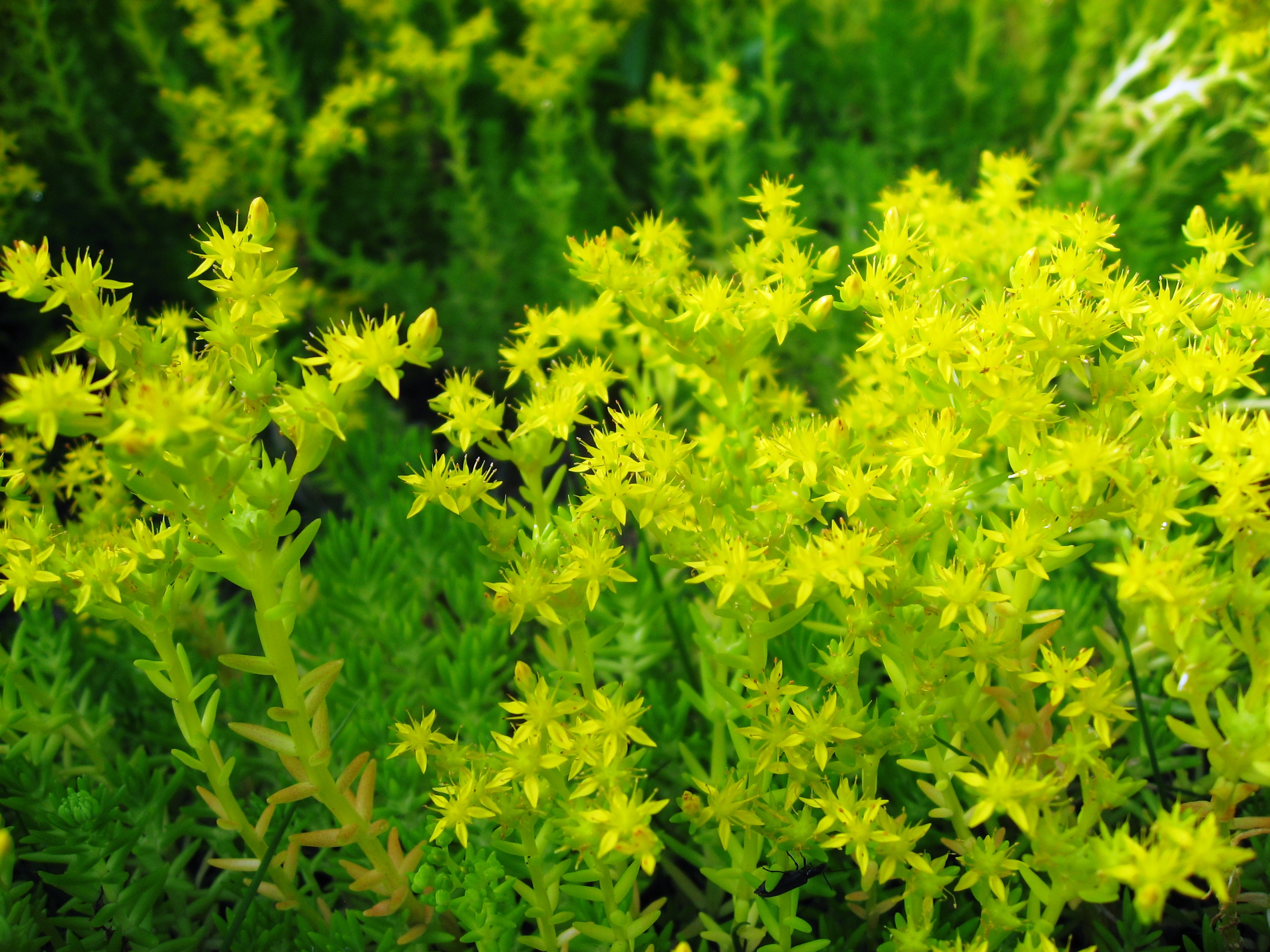

Scientific classification
- Kingdom: Plantae
- Clade: Tracheophytes
- Clade: Angiosperms
- Clade: Eudicots
- Order: Saxifragales
- Family: Crassulaceae
- Genus: Sedum
- Species: S. mexicanum

Binomial name
- Sedum mexicanum Britt.

= Sedum mexicanum =

Species of succulent

Sedum mexicanum, commonly known as the Mexican stonecrop or Lemon Coral, is a flowering plant in the family Crassulaceae.
