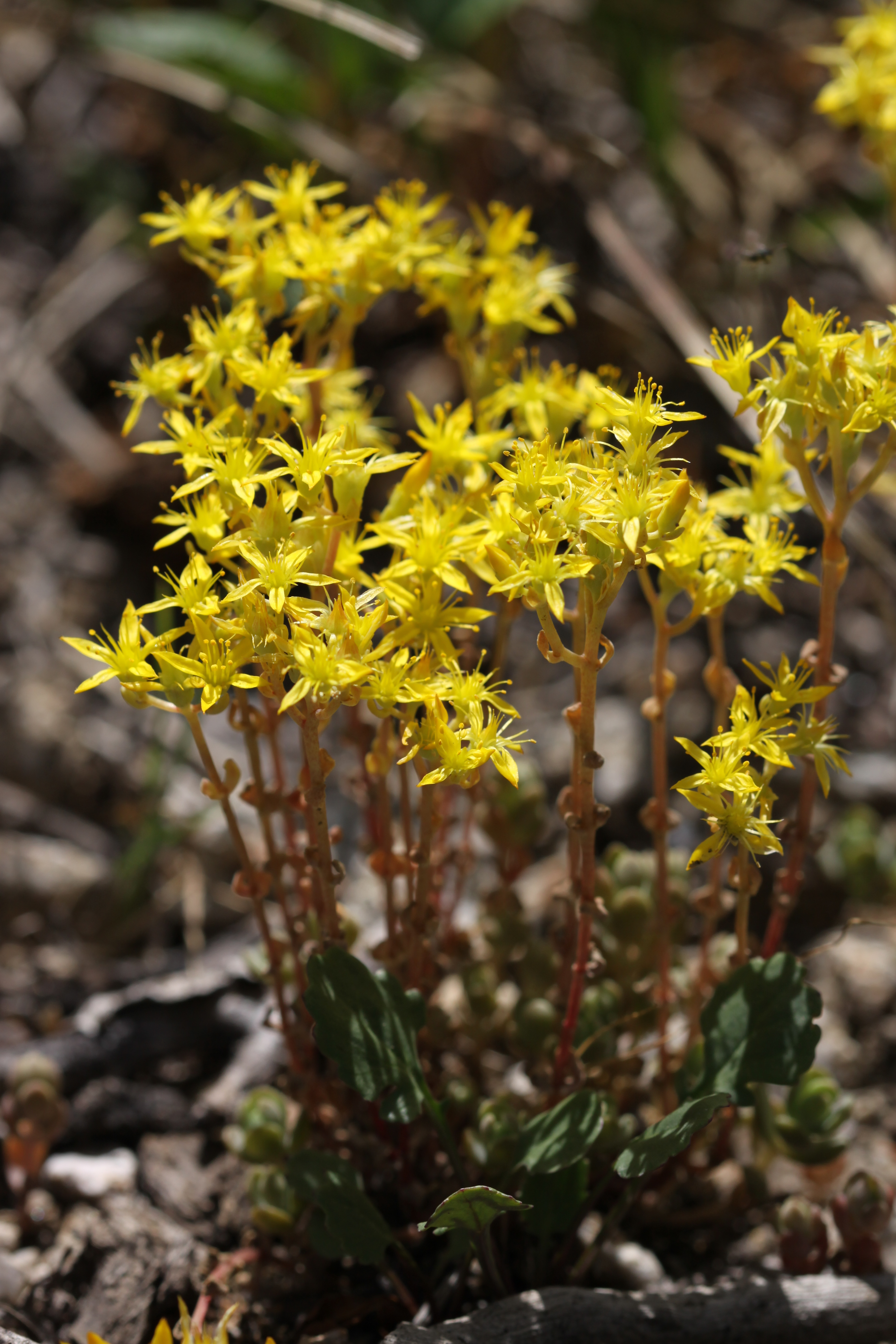
- Sedum debile flowers

Scientific classification
- Kingdom: Plantae
- Clade: Tracheophytes
- Clade: Angiosperms
- Clade: Eudicots
- Order: Saxifragales
- Family: Crassulaceae
- Genus: Sedum
- Species: S. debile

Binomial name
- Sedum debile S.Watson

= Sedum debile =

Species of succulent

Sedum debile, commonly called orpine stonecrop or weakstem stonecrop, is a low growing carpet-forming flowering plant species of the genus Sedum in the family Crassulaceae.

== Description and distribution ==
The species' pedicels are long while the stems are slender and weak with round and flat leaves and yellow colored flowers.

The flowers of Sedum debile have sepals which are pale green and glaucous in color. The lanceolate and equal leaves are 2–4.2 by 1.3–2 millimetres (0.079 in–0.165 in × 0.051 in–0.079 in). Pedicels are 1.2 millimetres (0.047 in) long while the leaves on them are 4.2–7.2 by 2.8–4.3 millimetres (0.17 in–0.28 in × 0.11 in–0.17 in). The apex, while obtuse is also emarginated.

The species flowers during summer months and can be found on elevation of 1,500–3,500 metres (4,900–11,500 ft) in states such as Idaho, Montana, Nevada, New Mexico, Oregon, Utah and Wyoming.
