= Sedum oblanceolatum =

Scientific classification
- Kingdom: Plantae
- Clade: Tracheophytes
- Clade: Angiosperms
- Clade: Eudicots
- Order: Saxifragales
- Family: Crassulaceae
- Genus: Sedum
- Species: S. oblanceolatum

Binomial name
- Sedum oblanceolatum R.T.Clausen

Species of succulent

Sedum oblanceolatum is a species of flowering plant in the family Crassulaceae known by the common names oblongleaf stonecrop and Applegate stonecrop. It is native to the Klamath Mountains of southwestern Oregon and far northern California, where it grows on many types of rocky substrate, such as serpentine soils and other ultramafics. It is a succulent plant forming basal rosettes of waxy leaves. The leaves are mainly lance-shaped, widest near the distal end and narrowing to rounded or notched tips. Smaller leaves occur higher up the stem. The small inflorescence grows a few centimeters tall and bears up to 50 flowers in a flat-topped array. The flowers have cream or yellowish petals up to a centimeter long.
