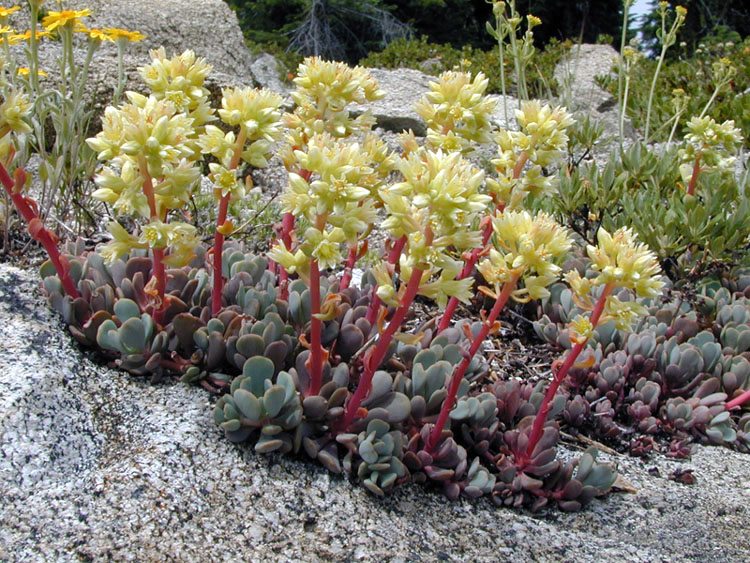

Scientific classification
- Kingdom: Plantae
- Clade: Tracheophytes
- Clade: Angiosperms
- Clade: Eudicots
- Order: Saxifragales
- Family: Crassulaceae
- Genus: Sedum
- Species: S. oregonense

Binomial name
- Sedum oregonense (S.Watson) M.Peck

Synonyms
- Cotyledon oregonensis Gormania watsonii

= Sedum oregonense =

Species of succulent

Sedum oregonense is a species of flowering plant in the family Crassulaceae known by the common name cream stonecrop. It is native to the Klamath Ranges of southern Oregon and northern California, where it grows in rocky habitat. It is a succulent plant forming basal rosettes of leaves up to about 4 centimeters long. Smaller leaves occur higher up the stem. The leaves are green in color and waxy in texture. The inflorescence is an upright, wide open array of flowers. The flowers have yellow petals with red-tinged or white-speckled undersides.
