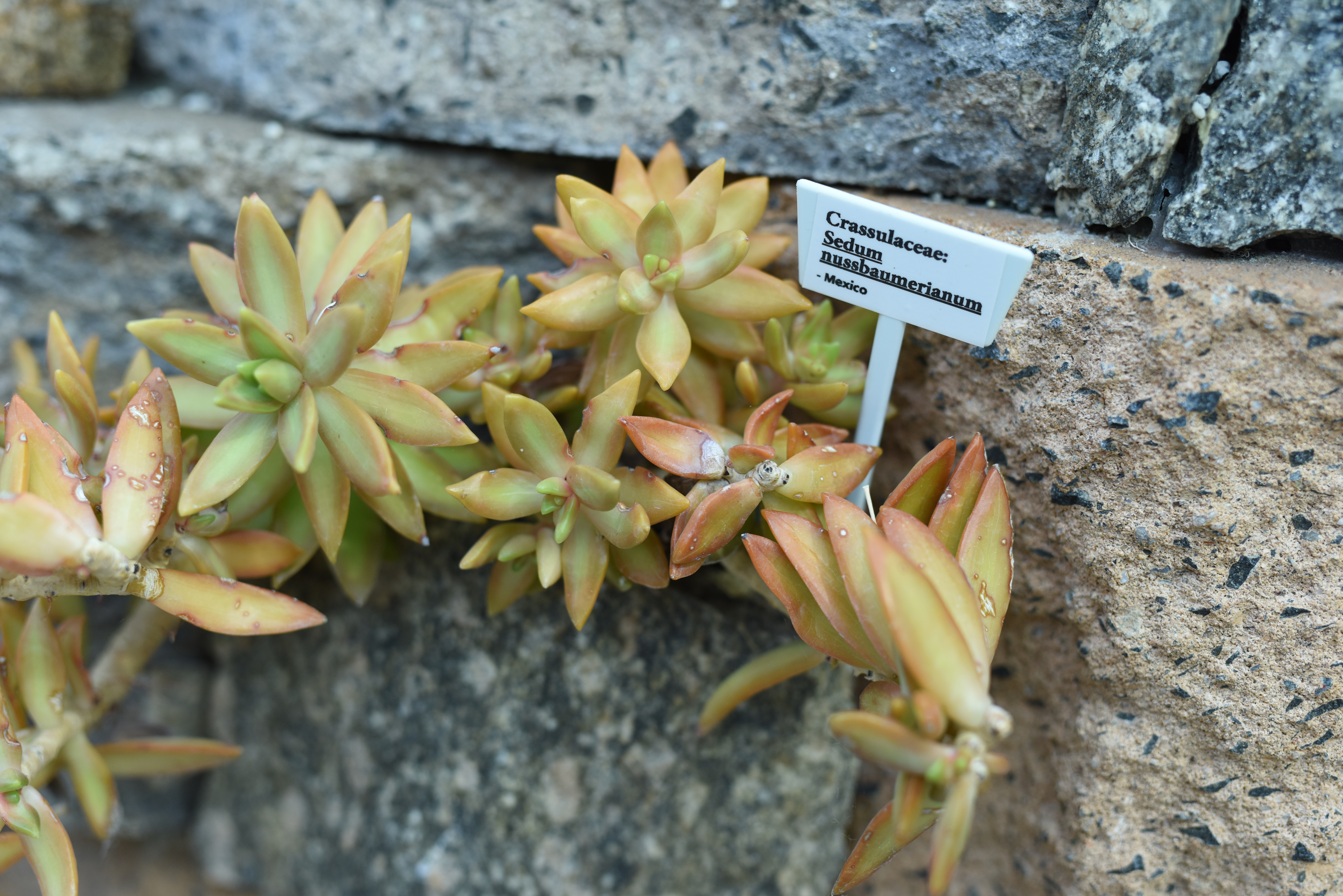
- At the Marsh Botanical Garden

Scientific classification
- Kingdom: Plantae
- Clade: Tracheophytes
- Clade: Angiosperms
- Clade: Eudicots
- Order: Saxifragales
- Family: Crassulaceae
- Genus: Sedum
- Species: S. adolphi

Binomial name
- Sedum adolphi Raym.-Hamet

Synonyms
- Sedum nussbaumerianum Bitter

= Sedum adolphi =

Species of succulent

Sedum adolphi (often erroneously spelled Sedum adolphii), the coppertone stonecrop or golden Sedum, is a species of succulent plant in the family Crassulaceae. It is native to Mexico, where it grows in rocky terrain and on cliff faces. It has also become naturalized in Sicily and the Canary Islands. It is known for its bright orange-copper leaves and white flowers that bloom in the spring.

== Description ==
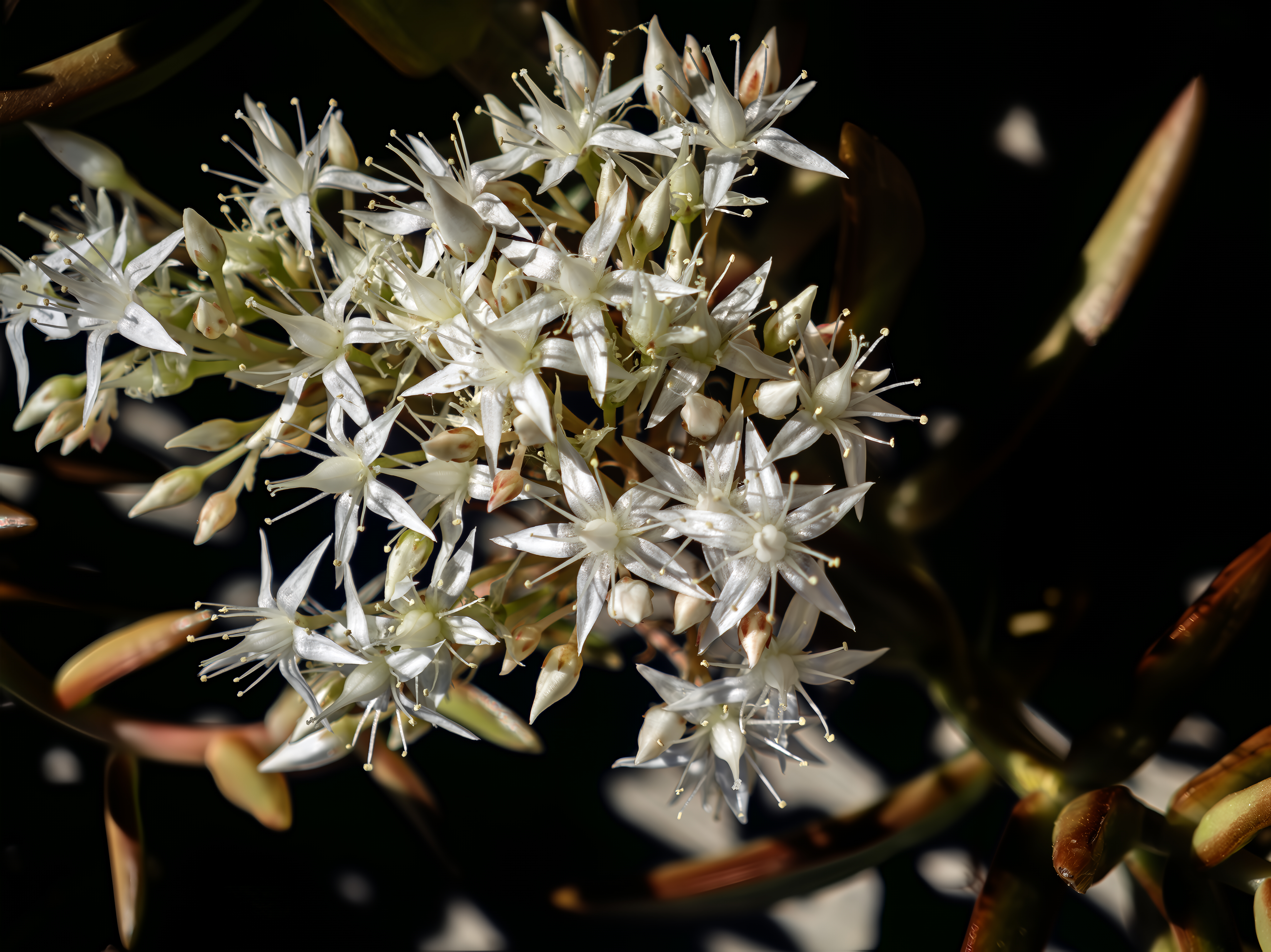
Sedum adolphi - inflorescence

This species grows up to 20 cm tall and has small star-shaped white flowers. It is hardy in USDA zone 9 and southward. Sedum adolphi can be propagated from its cuttings, leaves, and seeds. The leaves are evergreen and can develop red or orange edges if given enough sun. S. adolphi is a simple plant to grow that prefers direct sun exposure and when temperatures exceed 20°C it prefers windy areas. S. adolphi needs little water during its November-March rest period since this plant is able to survive with humidity reserves for short periods of time.

== General care ==
Sedum adolphi requires very little care and is easy to grow, making it a popular choice for gardeners and succulent enthusiasts. It thrives in full sun, a well-draining soil, and little water. It is best grown outdoors, but can also do well in hanging baskets or rock gardens. To propagate, you can use leaves, cuttings, or seeds.

== Toxicity ==
While some varieties of Sedum such as S. morganianum are toxic to humans and animals, Sedum adolphi is not listed as toxic on the ASPCA's website.
