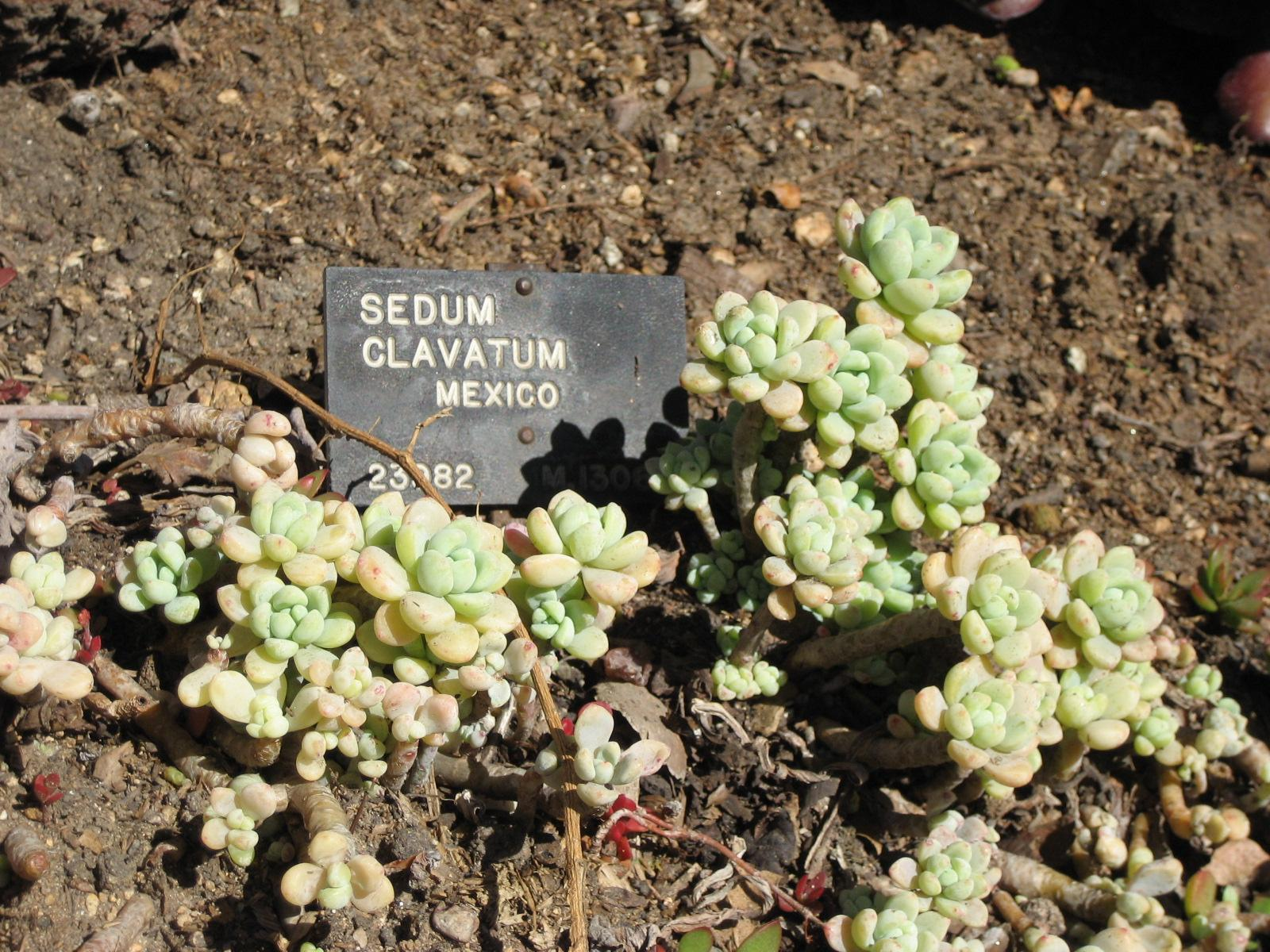

Scientific classification
- Kingdom: Plantae
- Clade: Tracheophytes
- Clade: Angiosperms
- Clade: Eudicots
- Order: Saxifragales
- Family: Crassulaceae
- Genus: Sedum
- Species: S. clavatum

Binomial name
- Sedum clavatum R.T.Clausen

= Sedum clavatum =

Species of succulent

Sedum clavatum is a succulent plant that grows in compact rosettes that elongate into long stems with time. Originally identified growing in southern Mexico, S. clavatum produces white, star-shaped flowers in mid to late spring to early summer. They are often grown as decorative plants in rock gardens. Like almost all succulents, S. clavatum needs to be protected from frost and is hardy to 32 °F (0 °C). It grows four to six inches tall at mature height and 8 inches wide. S. clavatum is an annual that needs average watering and is categorized as fairly easy to maintain. It flourishes in semi-arid and arid climates from southern California to mid-Texas, but can be grown elsewhere given proper precautions.

== Care ==
Sedum clavatum require porous, well-draining soil and 4–6 hours of sunlight. They require watering when the soil is dry, but over-watering is to be avoided.
