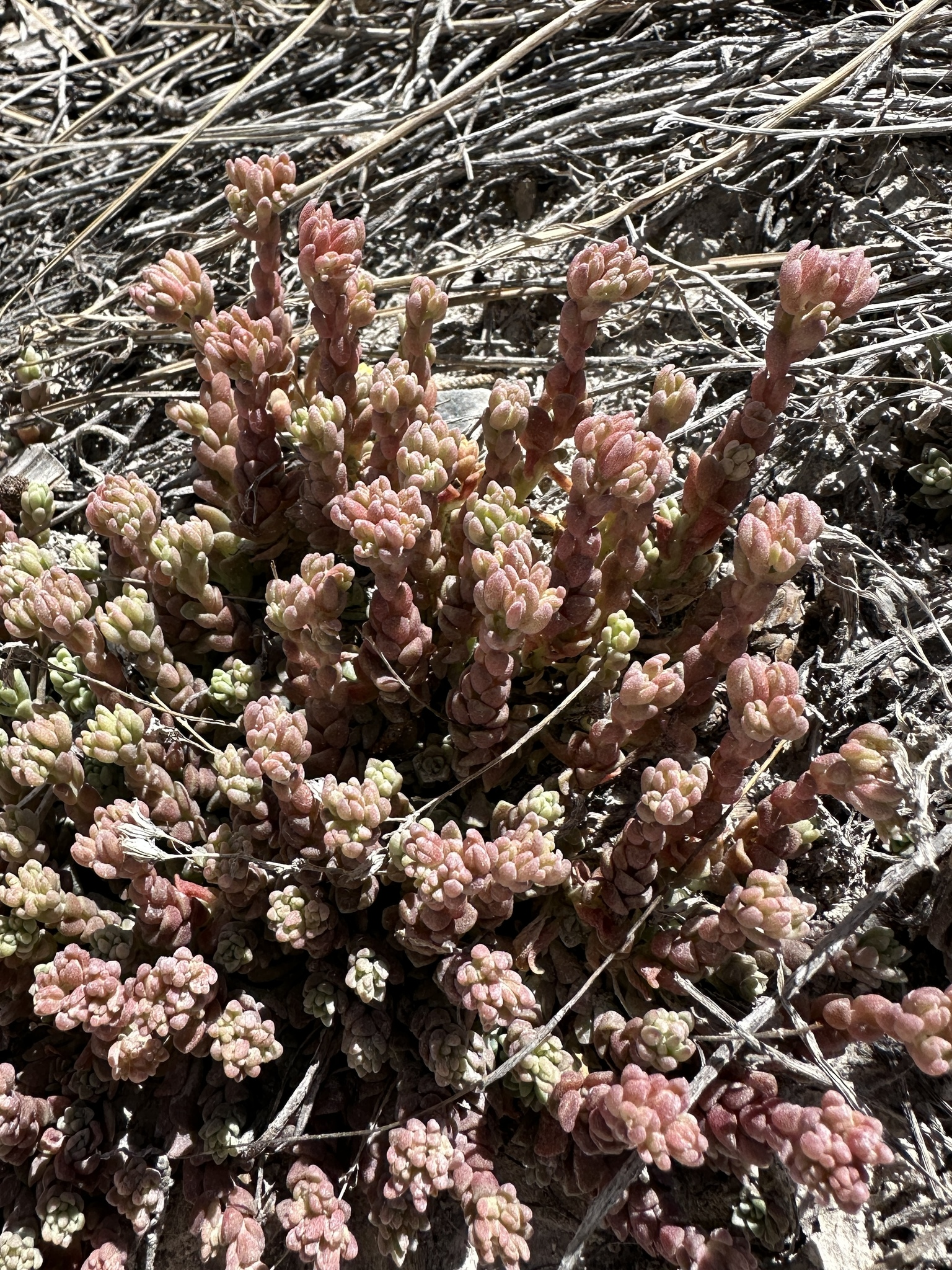

Scientific classification
- Kingdom: Plantae
- Clade: Tracheophytes
- Clade: Angiosperms
- Clade: Eudicots
- Order: Saxifragales
- Family: Crassulaceae
- Genus: Sedum
- Species: S. niveum

Binomial name
- Sedum niveum Davidson

= Sedum niveum =

Species of succulent

Sedum niveum is a species of flowering plant in the family Crassulaceae known by the common name Davidson's stonecrop. It is native to southern California and northern Baja California, where it is known from several local mountain ranges. It grows in rocky, forested habitat. It is a succulent plant forming basal mats of spoon-shaped or oval leaves no more than a centimeter long. The small inflorescence grows up to 9 centimeters tall and bears several flowers with white petals tinged or veined with pink. The stamens have red or black anthers.
