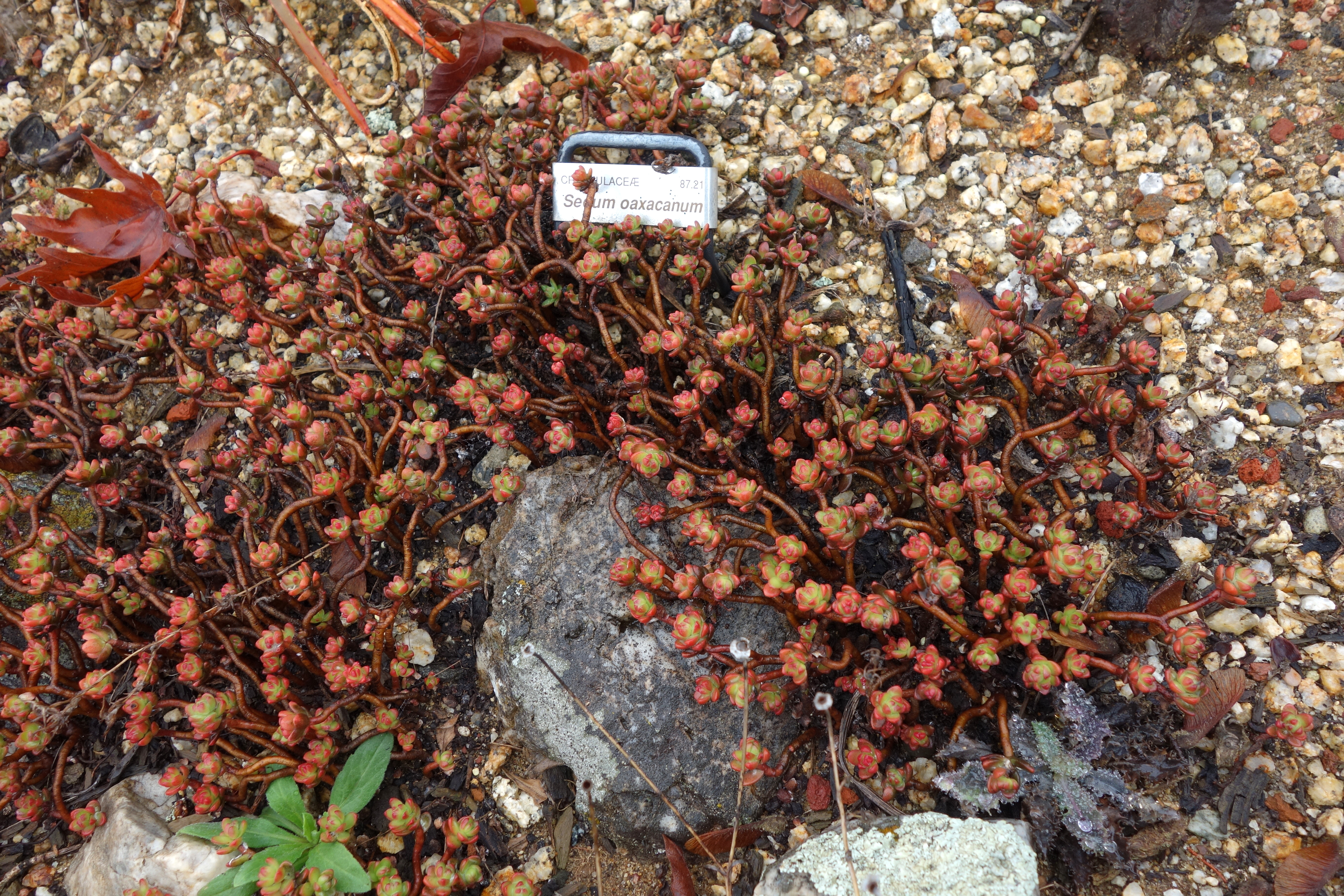

Scientific classification
- Kingdom: Plantae
- Clade: Tracheophytes
- Clade: Angiosperms
- Clade: Eudicots
- Order: Saxifragales
- Family: Crassulaceae
- Genus: Sedum
- Species: S. oaxacanum

Binomial name
- Sedum oaxacanum Rose

= Sedum oaxacanum =

Species of succulent

Sedum oaxacanum is a species of flowering plant in the family Crassulaceae. They are evergreen perennials reaching heights of 10 to 20 centimeters, with simple blue-green leaves and yellow five-stellate flowers.

Sedum oaxacanum is native to Mexico. Through vegetative cloning it is propagated from cuttings.
