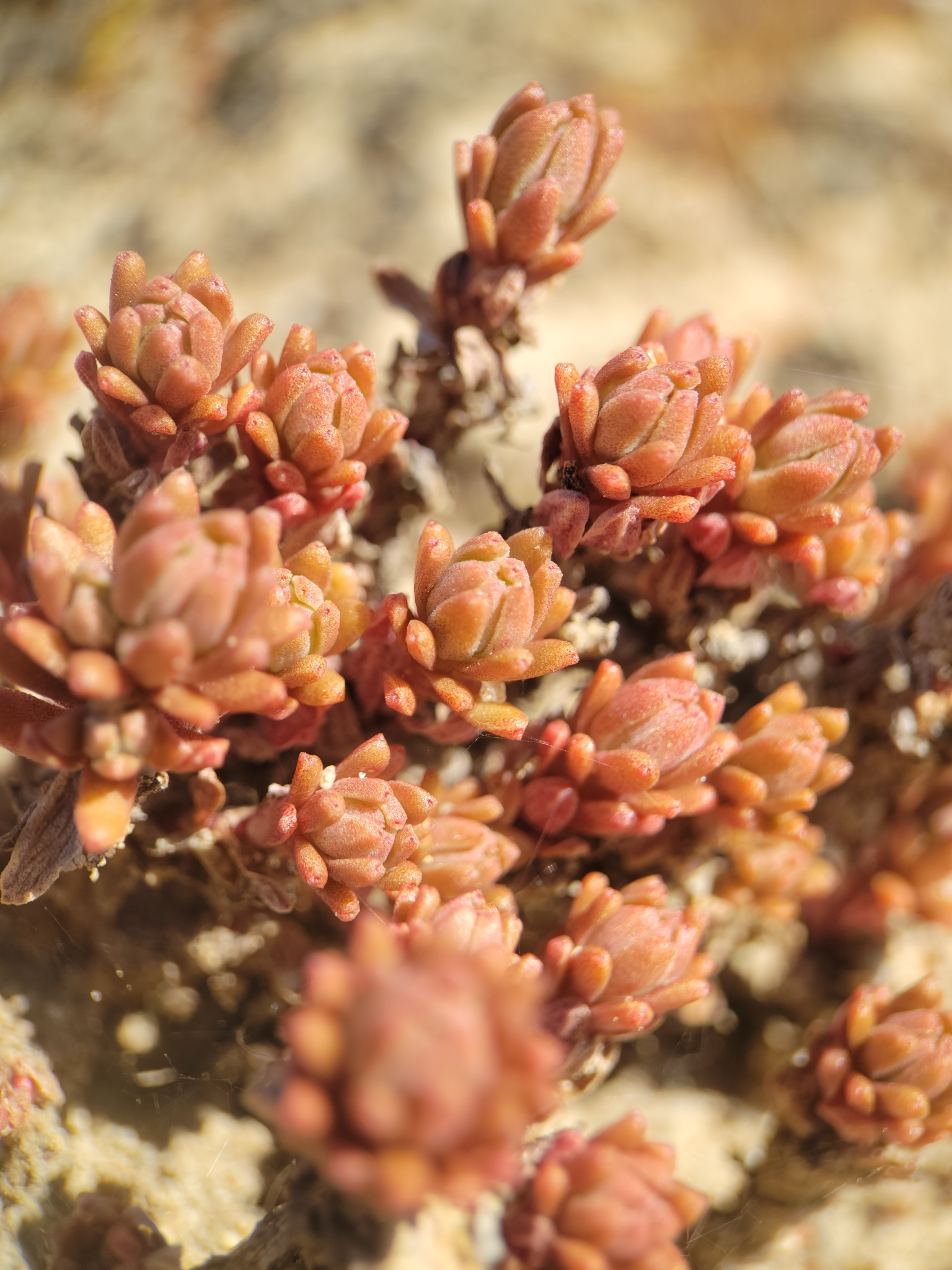

Scientific classification
- Kingdom: Plantae
- Clade: Tracheophytes
- Clade: Angiosperms
- Clade: Eudicots
- Order: Saxifragales
- Family: Crassulaceae
- Genus: Sedum
- Species: S. radiatum

Binomial name
- Sedum radiatum S.Watson

= Sedum radiatum =

Species of succulent

Sedum radiatum is a species of flowering plant in the family Crassulaceae known by the common name Coast Range stonecrop. It is native to Oregon and California, where it is known from several coastal and inland mountain ranges, including the Klamath Mountains and the Sierra Nevada. It grows in many types of rocky habitat, sometimes on serpentine soils. It is an annual or biennial succulent plant producing several stems with elevated, somewhat basal rosettes of leaves. The leaves are not much more than a centimeter long. They are green or yellowish with green, purple, or red veining. The inflorescence is a short, erect array of many densely packed flowers. The flowers have yellow, cream, or white petals which are lance-shaped and one half to 1 centimeter long.
