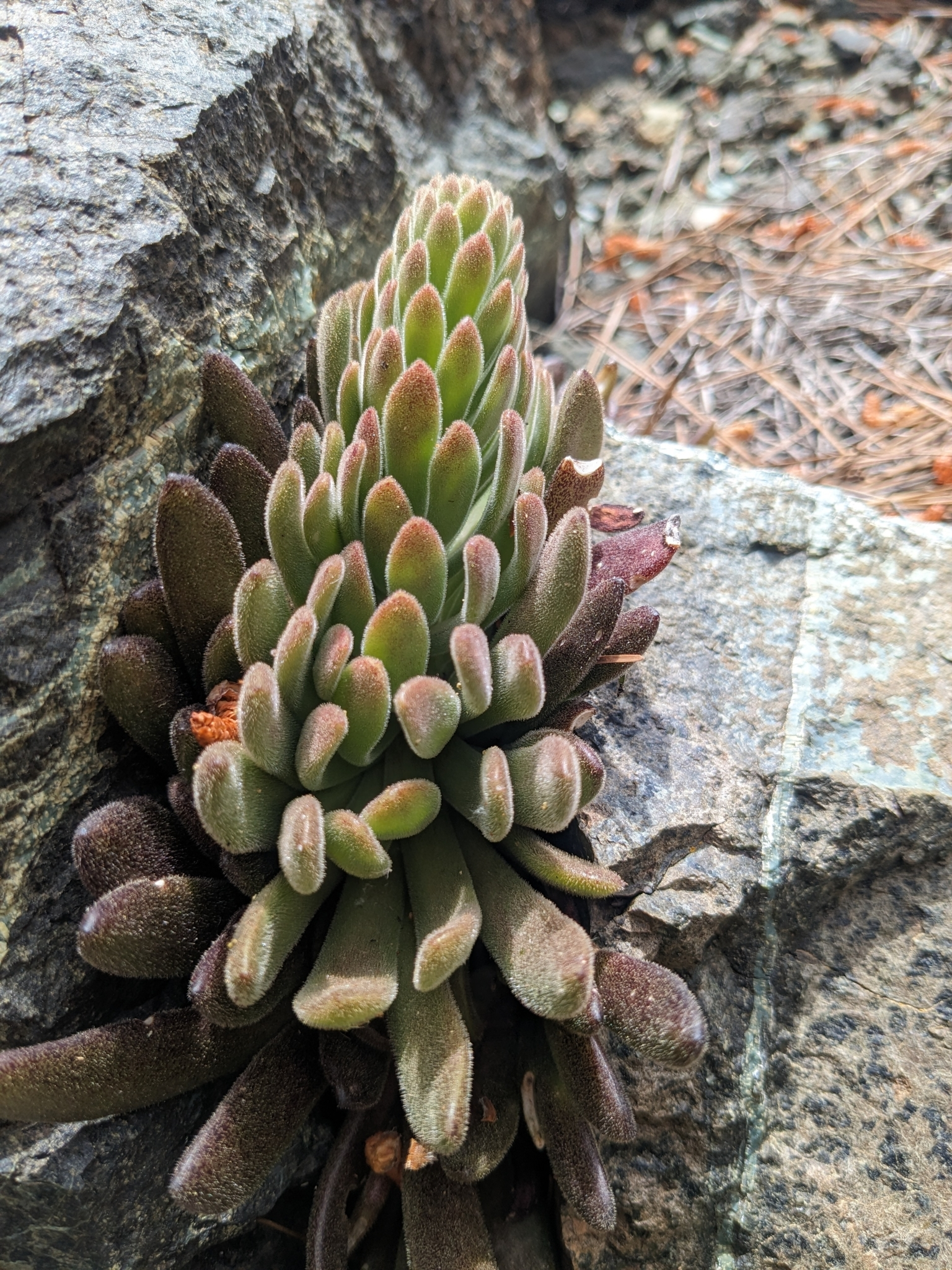

Scientific classification
- Kingdom: Plantae
- Clade: Embryophytes
- Clade: Tracheophytes
- Clade: Angiosperms
- Clade: Eudicots
- Order: Saxifragales
- Family: Crassulaceae
- Genus: Sedum
- Species: S. microstachyum

Binomial name
- Sedum microstachyum (Kotschy) Boiss.

Synonyms
- Sedum lampusae var. microstachyum (Kotschy) Fröd.; Umbilicus microstachyus Kotschy

= Sedum microstachyum =

Species of flowering plant

Sedum microstachyum is a species of flowering plant in the family Crassulaceae. It is referred to by the common name small-spiked stonecrop. It is an erect, succulent, monocarpic herb, with an unbranched stem up to 40 cm (16 in) high. Leaves succulent, simple, entire, glandular, hairy, reddish in sunny positions, sessile, the basal crowded in rosettes, spathulate-linear 3-7 x 0.5-1.5 cm, the higher smaller, spirally arranged. Flowers actinomorphic, small, reddish or greenish, in a cylindrical panicle, flowering from June to September. Fruit a many-seeded follicle.

== Habitat ==
Rock crevices on igneous formations at 1,500–1,900 m (4,900–6,200 ft) altitude.

== Distribution ==
Endemic to Cyprus, confined to the Troödos forest where it is fairly common: Chromion, Khionistra, Loumata Aeton and Troödos Square.
