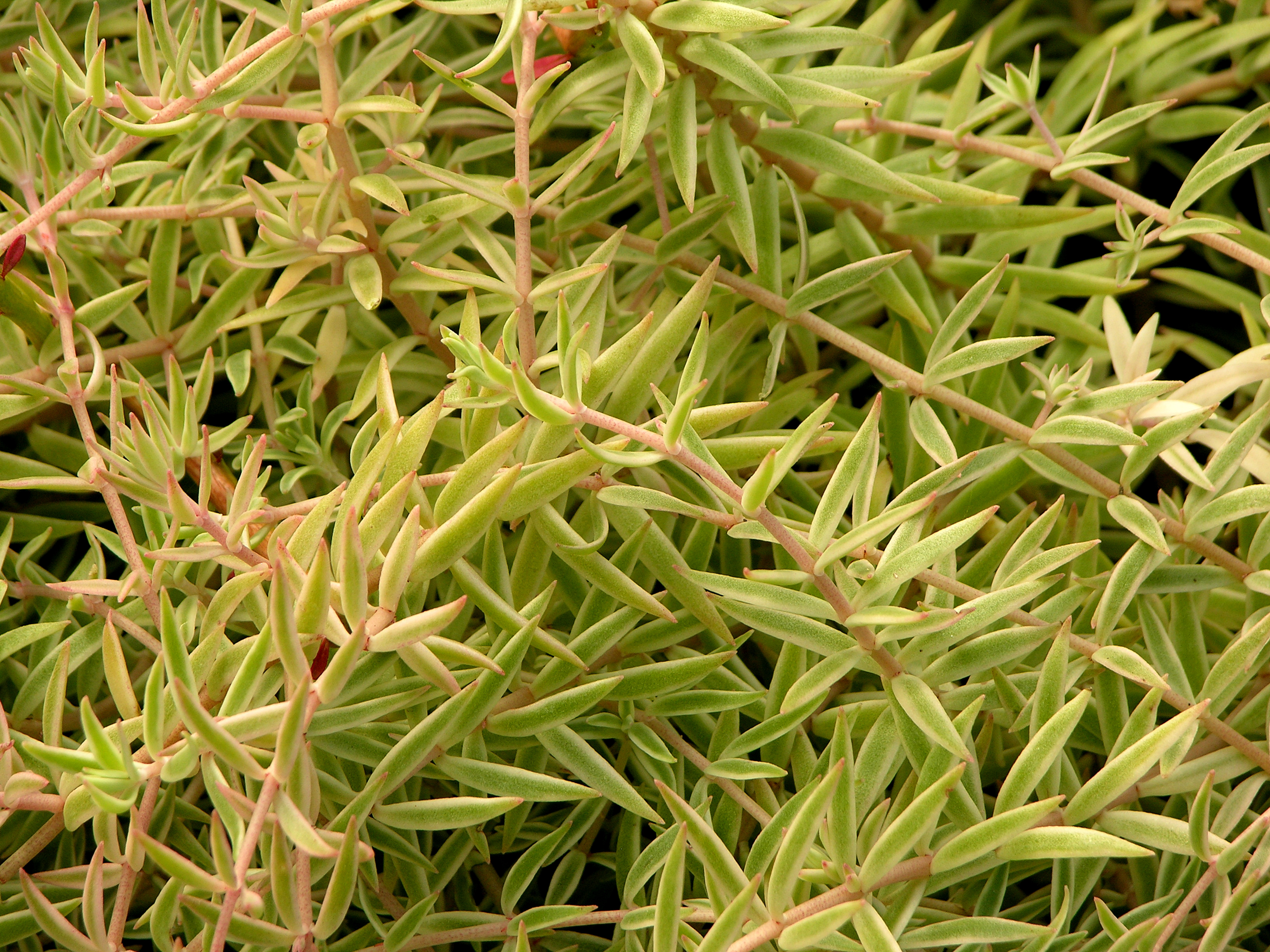
- Variegated Sedum lineare

Scientific classification
- Kingdom: Plantae
- Clade: Tracheophytes
- Clade: Angiosperms
- Clade: Eudicots
- Order: Saxifragales
- Family: Crassulaceae
- Genus: Sedum
- Species: S. lineare

Binomial name
- Sedum lineare Thunb.

Synonyms
- Sedum subtile Miq.

= Sedum lineare =

Species of succulent

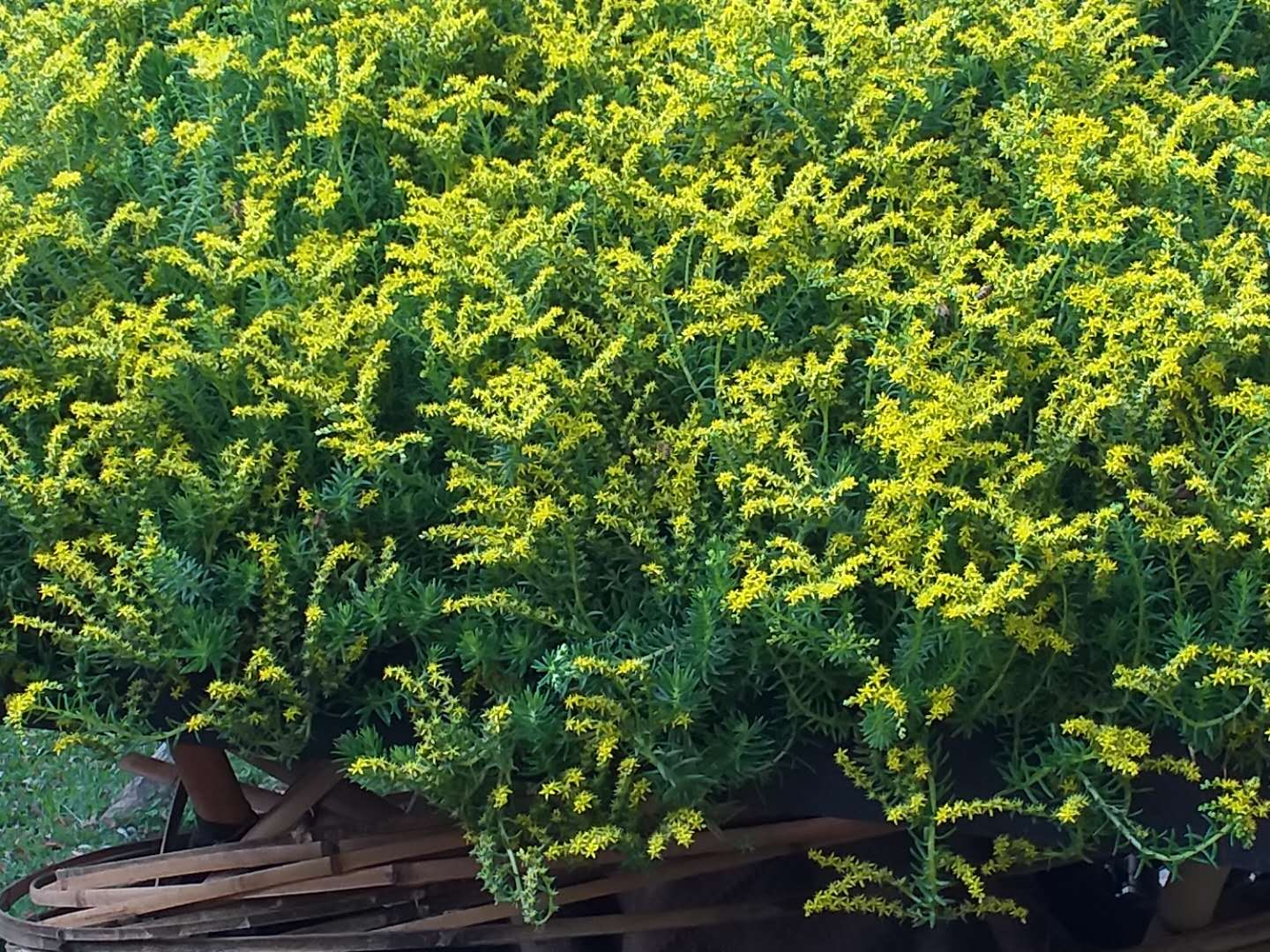
Flowering of Sedum lineare, 2018 Taichung World Flora Exposition, Taiwan.

Sedum lineare, also known as carpet sedum, needle stonecrop or sea urchin, is a sedum originating in East Asia.

It has been proposed as an ideal plant for the "greening" of flat-roofed buildings in Shanghai, China, due to factors such as its ability to tolerate cold and drought, little need for soil and its roots' lack of penetrating ability.
