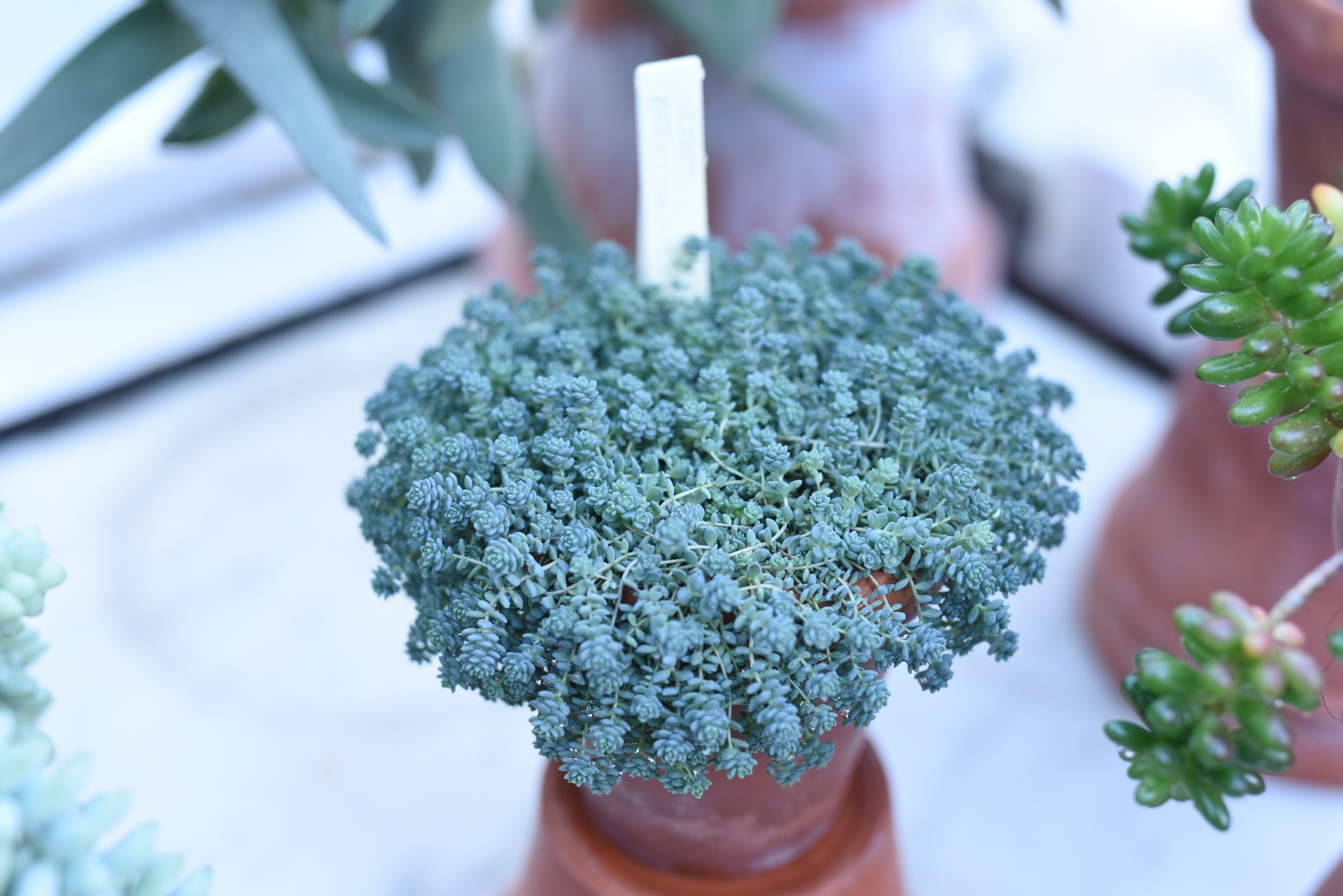
- Sedum brevifolium in the Talcott Greenhouse at Mount Holyoke

Scientific classification
- Kingdom: Plantae
- Clade: Tracheophytes
- Clade: Angiosperms
- Clade: Eudicots
- Order: Saxifragales
- Family: Crassulaceae
- Genus: Sedum
- Species: S. brevifolium

Binomial name
- Sedum brevifolium DC.

= Sedum brevifolium =

Species of succulent

Sedum brevifolium is a slowly spreading succulent plant in the genus Sedum.
