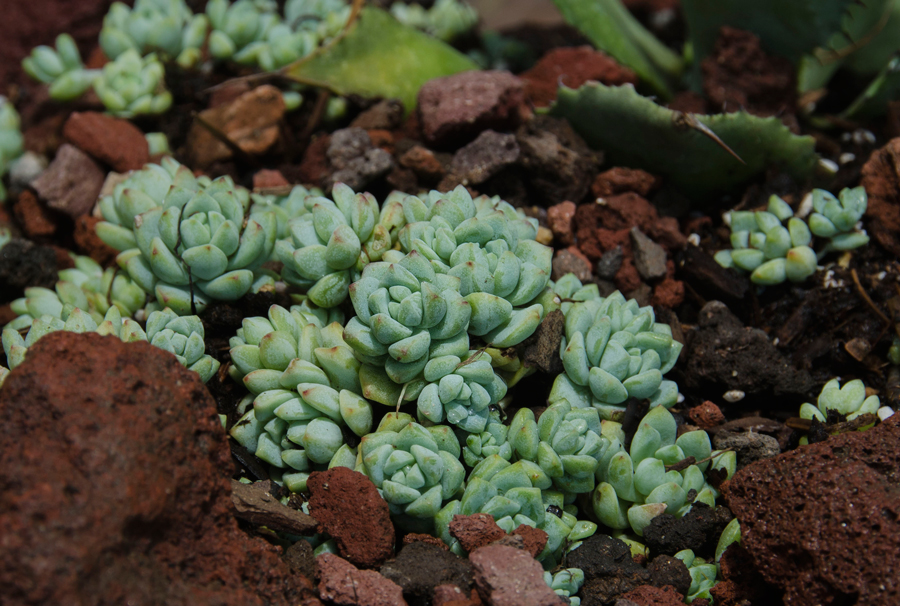

Scientific classification
- Kingdom: Plantae
- Clade: Tracheophytes
- Clade: Angiosperms
- Clade: Eudicots
- Order: Saxifragales
- Family: Crassulaceae
- Genus: Sedum
- Species: S. perezdelarosae

Binomial name
- Sedum perezdelarosae Jimeno-Sevilla

= Sedum perezdelarosae =

Species of succulent

Sedum perezdelarosae is a species of flowering plant in the genus Sedum.
