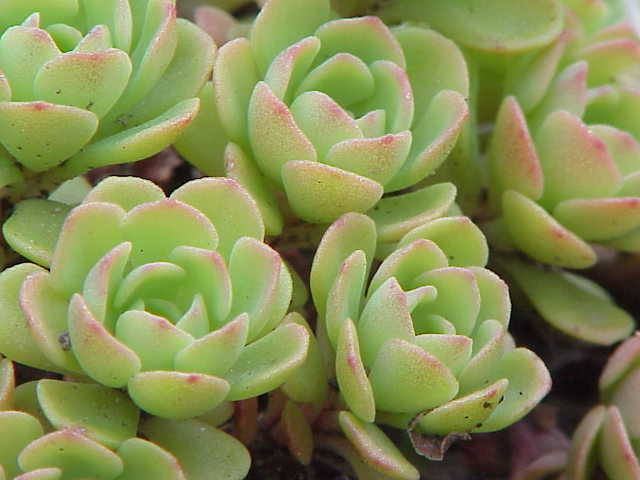

Scientific classification
- Kingdom: Plantae
- Clade: Tracheophytes
- Clade: Angiosperms
- Clade: Eudicots
- Order: Saxifragales
- Family: Crassulaceae
- Genus: Sedum
- Species: S. glaucophyllum

Binomial name
- Sedum glaucophyllum R.T.Clausen 1946

= Sedum glaucophyllum =

Species of succulent

Sedum glaucophyllum, the cliff stonecrop, is a species of Sedum native to the Appalachian Mountains in the eastern United States from West Virginia, Maryland, Virginia and North Carolina.

Sedum glaucophyllum is a prostrate, mat-forming evergreen perennial plant forming patches up to 30–40 cm (12–15.5 in) in diameter. The leaves are glaucous green, succulent, rounded, 1–2 cm (0.5–1 in) long and wide, arranged in a dense helix on the stems. The flowers are white, 10–12 mm (0.39–0.47 in) in diameter, with four slender, pointed petals; they are produced in clusters on erect stems up to 10 cm (4 in) tall, held above the foliage.
