= Sedum multiceps =

- Sedum multiceps juvenile with root system exposed

Scientific classification
- Kingdom: Plantae
- Clade: Tracheophytes
- Clade: Angiosperms
- Clade: Eudicots
- Order: Saxifragales
- Family: Crassulaceae
- Genus: Sedum
- Species: S. multiceps

Binomial name
- Sedum multiceps Coss. & Durieu

Species of succulent

Sedum multiceps, also known as miniature/pygmy Joshua tree, is a perennial, deciduous species of Sedum from the succulent plant family Crassulaceae, native to Algeria. The plant is nicknamed for its glaucous leaves that grow in clusters, resembling Yucca brevifolia. It was named officially as a distinct species in 1862.

== Description ==
Sedum multiceps has a many-branched, shrubby habit, and consists of grayish-green leaves growing at the tips of its branches. It grows shallow roots and mats of short woody stems which spread rapidly across large areas, and sprouts bright yellow, star-shaped flowers in late summer.

== Cultivation ==
Sedum multiceps is cultivated as an ornamental plant, typically for planting in containers or in gardens as groundcover. It needs very little attention, and tolerates all but the most loamy soil.
