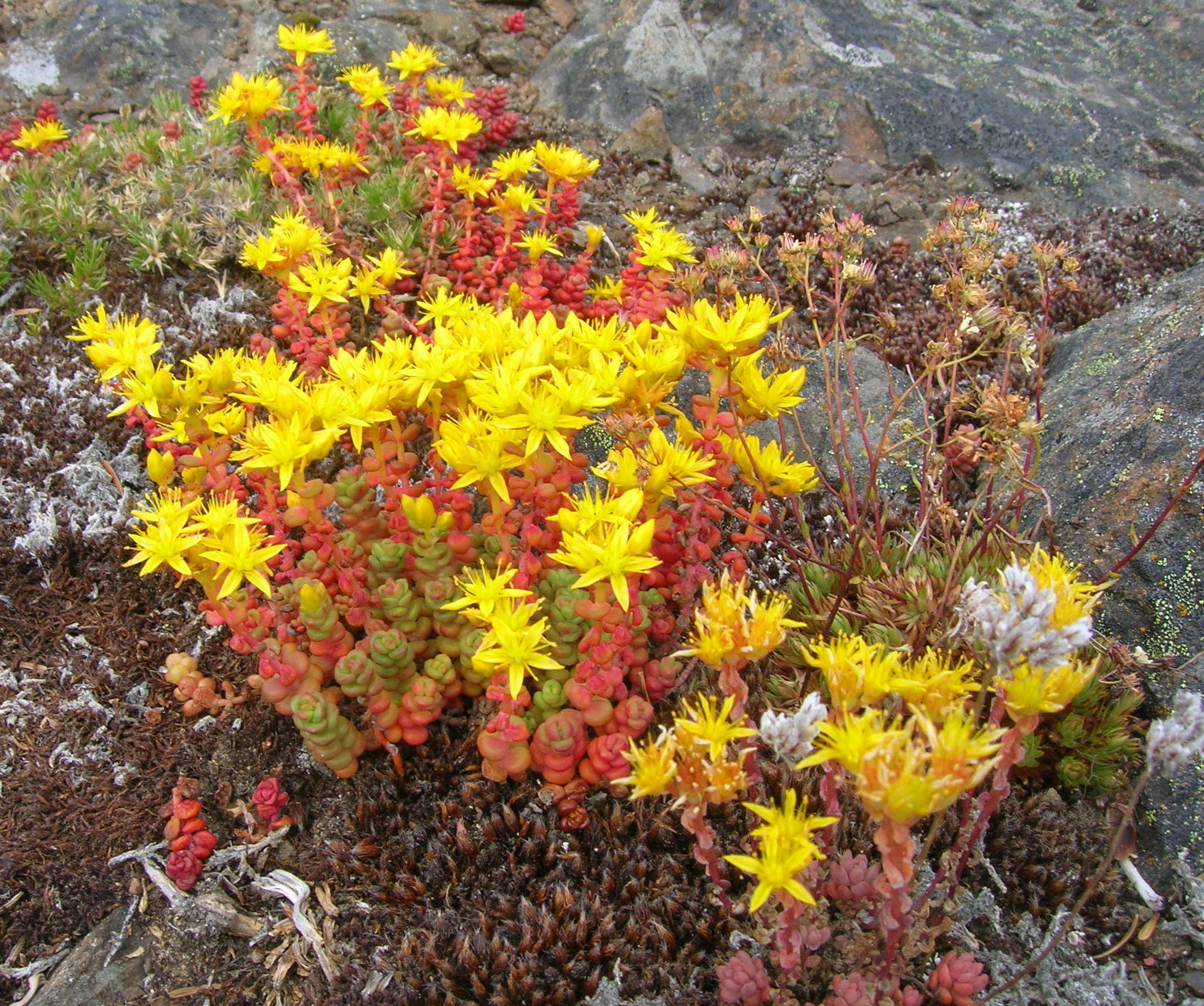

Scientific classification
- Kingdom: Plantae
- Clade: Tracheophytes
- Clade: Angiosperms
- Clade: Eudicots
- Order: Saxifragales
- Family: Crassulaceae
- Genus: Sedum
- Species: S. divergens

Binomial name
- Sedum divergens S.Watson

= Sedum divergens =

Species of succulent

Sedum divergens, commonly called spreading stonecrop, Cascade stonecrop or Pacific stonecrop, is a low growing flowering plant of the genus Sedum. It is native to western North America from Alaska to northern California. This plant is common in the lava beds of Northwest British Columbia where it is one of the food plants of the Nisga'a first nation.
