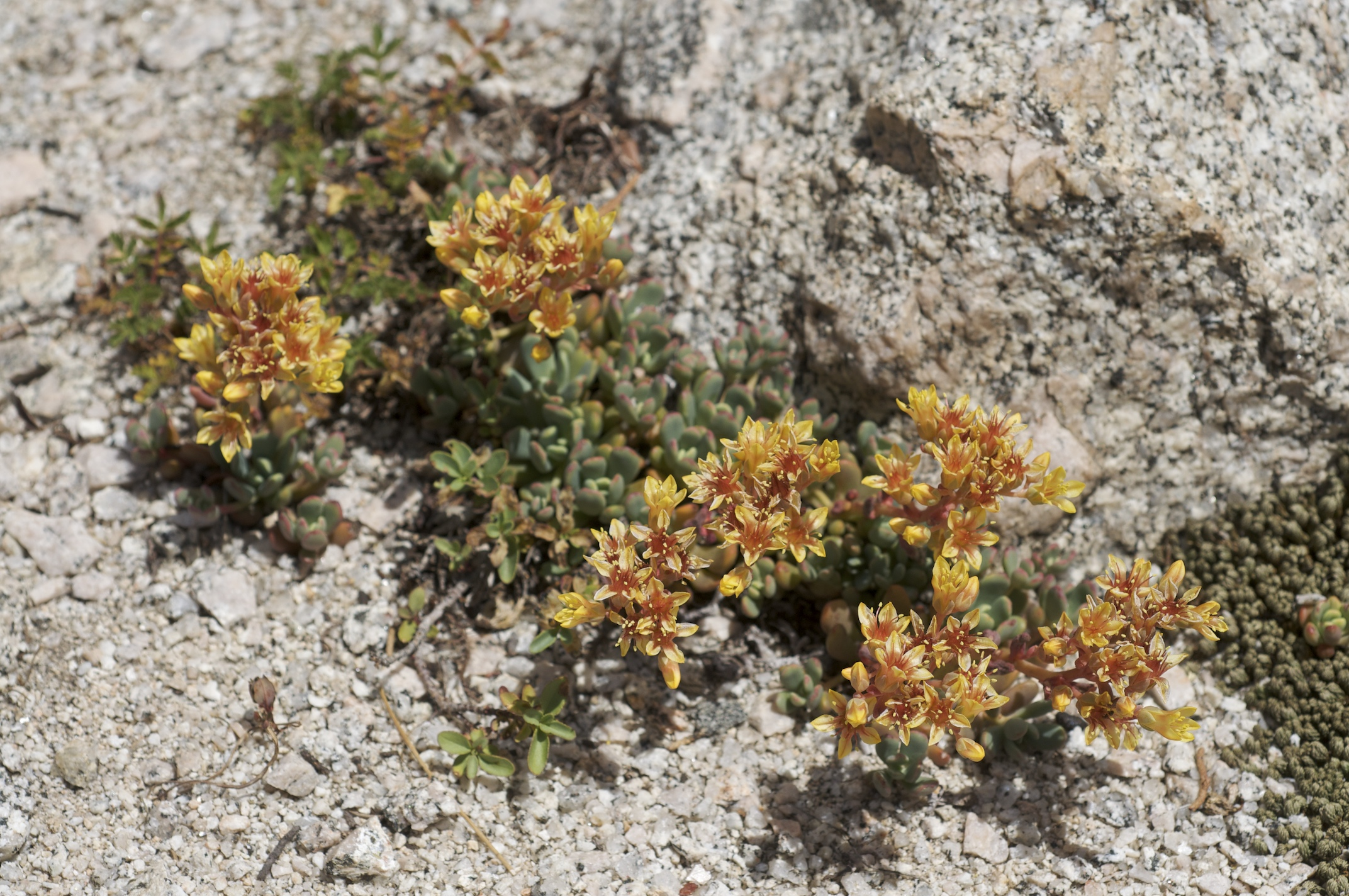

Scientific classification
- Kingdom: Plantae
- Clade: Tracheophytes
- Clade: Angiosperms
- Clade: Eudicots
- Order: Saxifragales
- Family: Crassulaceae
- Genus: Sedum
- Species: S. obtusatum

Binomial name
- Sedum obtusatum A.Gray

= Sedum obtusatum =

Species of succulent

Sedum obtusatum is a species of flowering plant in the family Crassulaceae known by the common name Sierra stonecrop. It is native to the Sierra Nevada and adjacent high mountain ranges of California, its distribution extending north into Oregon and east into Nevada. It grows in rocky mountain habitats.

== Description ==
It is a succulent plant forming basal rosettes of waxy leaves. The leaves are oval or spoon shaped and up to 3 centimeters long, with smaller ones occurring higher up the stem. The leaves are green to blue green to red tinged or all red. The inflorescence is an upright, sometimes flat-topped array of many flowers. The flowers have white petals tinged with green, yellow, or orange. It typically blooms from May to June.

Though it is not an obligatory host, it is described as a beneficial organism for the Euptoieta claudia butterfly.

=== Variety ===
One variety of this species, var. paradisum, is a very rare plant limited to the Trinity Mountains of California; it is sometimes treated as a species in its own right, the Canyon Creek stonecrop (Sedum paradisum).
