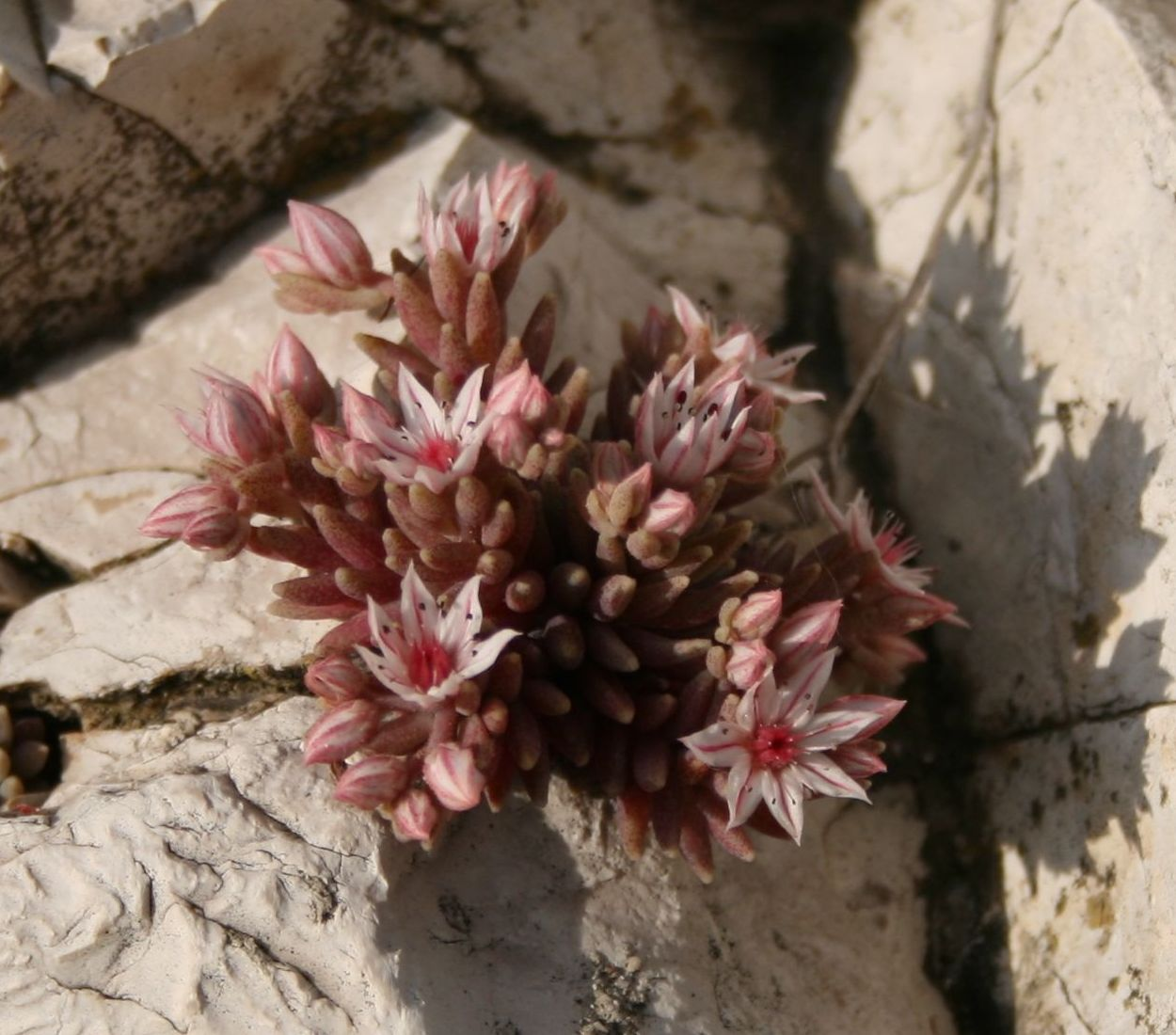

Scientific classification
- Kingdom: Plantae
- Clade: Tracheophytes
- Clade: Angiosperms
- Clade: Eudicots
- Order: Saxifragales
- Family: Crassulaceae
- Genus: Sedum
- Species: S. hispanicum

Binomial name
- Sedum hispanicum L.

= Sedum hispanicum =

Species of succulent

Sedum hispanicum, the Spanish stonecrop, is a species of flowering plant in the family Crassulaceae.

== Description ==
Sedum hispanicum is a glabrous or somewhat pubescent annual, 5–15 cm tall. Its stems branch. Its linear leaves are alternate, 7–10 mm long and rounded. Its flowers are usually six-parted, sometimes 7–9-parted, arranged in unilateral cymes. Its sepals are ovate-acute. Its white petals have a purple midrib, and are 5–7 mm long, lanceolate and acuminate. Its carpels are stellate. It flowers from March to June.

== Distribution and habitat ==
Sedum hispanicum is native from south-central and southeastern Europe to Iran and the Arabian Peninsula. Notwithstanding its specific epithet hispanicum, this stonecrop is not native to Spain. It thrives in loose rocky soil with plenty of drainage.

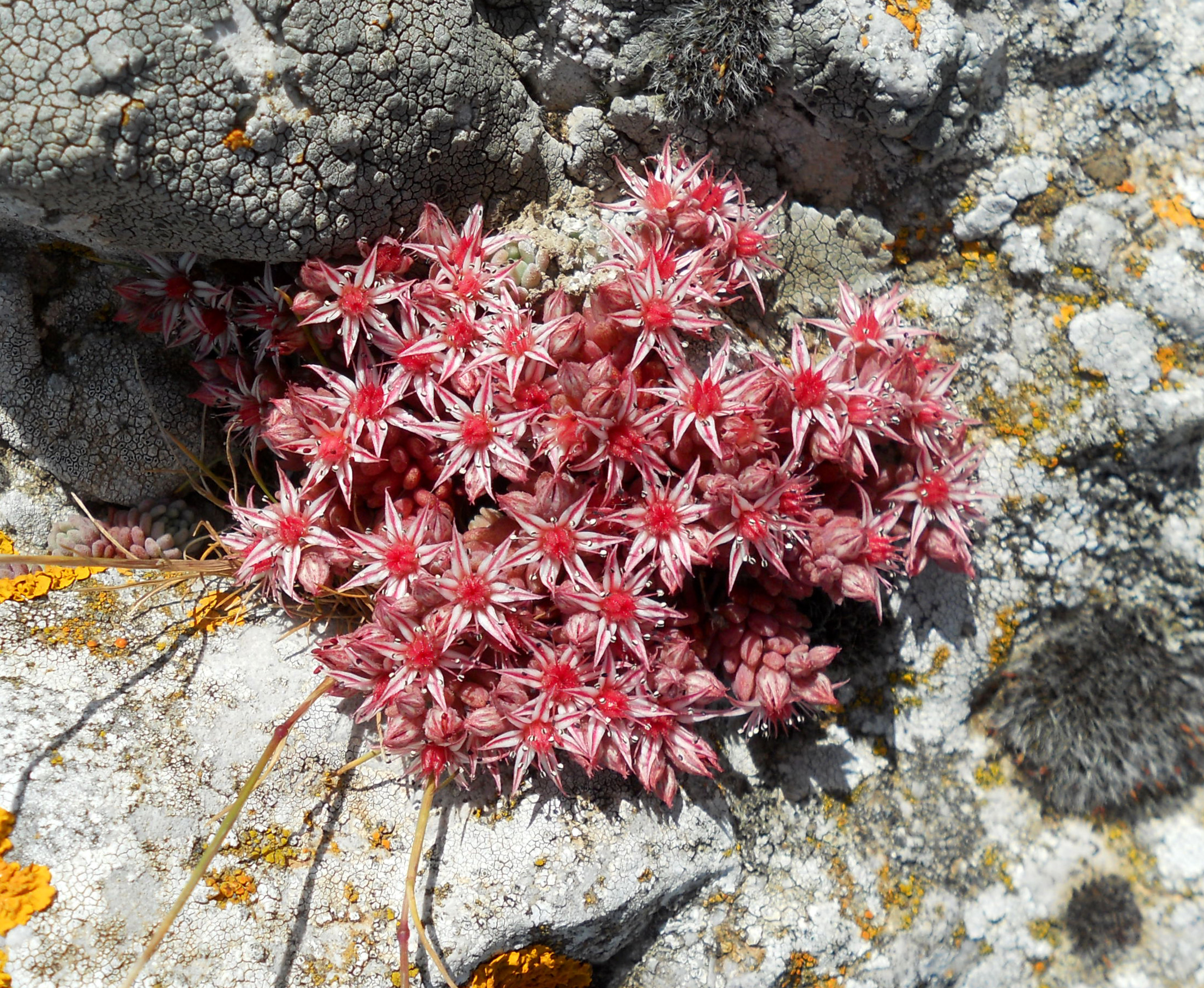
In Dikti
