= Sedum lampusae =

Scientific classification
- Kingdom: Plantae
- Clade: Embryophytes
- Clade: Tracheophytes
- Clade: Angiosperms
- Clade: Eudicots
- Order: Saxifragales
- Family: Crassulaceae
- Genus: Sedum
- Species: S. lampusae

Binomial name
- Sedum lampusae (Kotschy) Boiss.

Synonyms
- Umbilicus lampusae Kotschy

Species of flowering plant

Sedum lampusae is a species of flowering plant in the family Crassulaceae. It is an erect herb to 50 cm (20 in), dying after one flowering. Basal leaves flat, glaucous, fleshy, spoon-shaped, 4–10 cm (1.6–3.9 in) long, forming neat rosette which usually shrivels before the flowers open; steam leaves progressively smaller; inflorescence a long cylindrical or pyramidal spray, flowers numerous, crowded, brownish green, calyx-lobes and petals both 5, the latter narrow, pointed, 4 mm long, with a dark central vein. Stamens 10, follicles usually 5, erect, 5 mm long. Flowers from June to August. Common name is Lapta Damkoruğu.

== Habitat ==
Walls, rock crevices and dry stony slopes.

== Distribution ==
Endemic to Northern Cyprus. Frequent along the Kyrenia Range, notably at and above Lapta (whence the specific name).
