= Sedum laxum =

Scientific classification
- Kingdom: Plantae
- Clade: Embryophytes
- Clade: Tracheophytes
- Clade: Angiosperms
- Clade: Eudicots
- Order: Saxifragales
- Family: Crassulaceae
- Genus: Sedum
- Species: S. laxum

Binomial name
- Sedum laxum (Britton) A.Berger

Synonyms
- Echeveria gormanii A.Nelson & J.F.Macbr. Gormania laxa Britton

Species of flowering plant

Sedum laxum is a species of flowering plant in the family Crassulaceae known by the common name roseflower stonecrop. It is native to southwestern Oregon and northwestern California, where it can be found in rocky mountainous habitat. It is a succulent plant forming basal rosettes of oval or oblong leaves up to 3 cm (1.2 in) long. The inflorescence is made up of one or more erect arrays of many flowers. The flowers have reddish or yellowish petals up to 1.3 centimeters long each.
