= List of Sedum species =

List of species in the genus Sedum

This list of Sedum species shows the accepted species names within the genus Sedum, of which there are about 460.

== Alphabetical list of species ==
- Sedum abchasicum Kolak. ex V.V.Byalt
- Sedum acre L. – wall-pepper, goldmoss sedum, goldmoss stonecrop, biting stonecrop
- Sedum actinocarpum Yamam.
- Sedum adolphi Raym.-Hamet – Golden Sedum, Adolph's Sedum, Golden Glow Sedum
- Sedum aetnense Tineo
- Sedum alamosanum S.Watson
- Sedum albomarginatum R.T.Clausen – (Feather River stonecrop)
- Sedum album L. – white stonecrop
- Sedum alexanderi Eggli
- Sedum alfredii Hance
- Sedum allantoides Rose
- Sedum alpestre Vill.
- Sedum alsinifolium All.
- Sedum × amecamecanum Praeger
- Sedum andegavense (DC.) Desv.
- Sedum andinum Ball
- Sedum anglicum Huds. – English stonecrop
- Sedum annuum L. – annual stonecrop
- Sedum apoleipon 't Hart
- Sedum aquilanum L.Gallo & F.Conti
- Sedum arenarium Brot.
- Sedum argunense Galushko
- Sedum assyriacum Boiss.
- Sedum atratum L. – dark stonecrop
- Sedum australe Rose
- Sedum aytacianum J.Metzg.
- Sedum backebergii Poelln.
- Sedum baileyi Praeger
- Sedum baleensis M.G.Gilbert
- Sedum balfourii Raym.-Hamet
- Sedum barbeyi Raym.-Hamet
- Sedum barcense Maire & Weiller
- Sedum batallae Barocio
- Sedum batesii Hemsl.
- Sedum × battandieri Maire
- Sedum beauverdii Raym.-Hamet
- Sedum bellum Praeger
- Sedum bergeri Raym.-Hamet
- Sedum berillonanum Raym.-Hamet
- Sedum berunii U.P.Pratov
- Sedum bhattacharyyae R.Manik., N.B.Singh & S.K.Srivast.
- Sedum blepharophyllum Fröd.
- Sedum boninense Yamam. ex Tuyama
- Sedum bonnieri Raym.-Hamet
- Sedum booleanum B.L.Turner
- Sedum borissovae Balk.
- Sedum borschii R.T.Clausen
- Sedum botterii Hemsl.
- Sedum bourgaei Hemsl.
- Sedum brachetii J.Reyes, Islas & O.González
- Sedum bracteatum Viv.
- Sedum brevifolium DC.
- Sedum brissemoretii Raym.-Hamet
- Sedum bulbiferum Makino
- Sedum burrito Moran – baby burro's-tail
- Sedum caducum R.T.Clausen
- Sedum caeruleum L.
- Sedum calcaratum Rose
- Sedum calcicola B.L.Rob. & Greenm.
- Sedum callichroum Boiss.
- Sedum candolleanum G.López
- Sedum carinatifolium (R.T.Clausen) Pérez-Calix
- Sedum carnegiei Raym.-Hamet
- Sedum caroli-henrici Kit Tan
- Sedum catorce G.L.Nesom
- Sedum celatum Fröd.
- Sedum celiae Raym.-Hamet
- Sedum cepaea L. – pink stonecrop
- Sedum cespitosum (Cav.) DC.
- Sedum chauveaudii Raym.-Hamet
- Sedum chazaroi P.Carrillo & J.A.Lomelí
- Sedum chihuahuense S.Watson
- Sedum chingtungense K.T.Fu
- Sedum chloropetalum R.T.Clausen
- Sedum chrysicaulum J.A.McDonald
- Sedum chuhsingense K.T.Fu
- Sedum churchillianum Robyns & Boutique
- Sedum citrinum Zika
- Sedum clausenii Pérez-Calix
- Sedum clavatum R.T.Clausen
- Sedum clavifolium Rose
- Sedum cockerellii Britton – Cockerell's stonecrop
- Sedum commixtum Moran & Hutchison
- Sedum compactum Rose
- Sedum concarpum Fröd.
- Sedum confertiflorum Boiss.
- Sedum confusum Hemsl. – lesser Mexican-stonecrop
- Sedum constantini Raym.-Hamet
- Sedum conzattii Rose
- Sedum copalense Kimnach
- Sedum cormiferum R.T.Clausen
- Sedum correptum Fröd.
- Sedum corymbosum Grossh.
- Sedum corynephyllum Fröd.
- Sedum craigii R.T.Clausen
- Sedum crassularia Raym.-Hamet
- Sedum creticum C.Presl
- Sedum cupressoides Hemsl.
- Sedum cuspidatum Alexander
- Sedum cymatopetalum Fröd.
- Sedum cyprium A.K.Jacks. & Turrill
- Sedum daigremontianum Raym.-Hamet
- Sedum danjoense Takuro Ito, H.Nakan. & Kokub.
- Sedum dasyphyllum L. – thick-leaved stonecrop
- Sedum debile S.Watson – orpine stonecrop, weakstem stonecrop
- Sedum decipiens (Baker) Thiede & 't Hart
- Sedum dendroideum Moc. & Sessé ex DC. – tree stonecrop
- Sedum × derbezii Petitm.
- Sedum didymocalyx Fröd.
- Sedum dielsii Raym.-Hamet
- Sedum diffusum S.Watson
- Sedum diminutum (R.T.Clausen) G.L.Nesom
- Sedum dimorphophyllum K.T.Fu & G.Y.Rao
- Sedum dispermum Fröd.
- Sedum divergens S.Watson – spreading stonecrop
- Sedum dongzhiense D.Q.Wang & Y.L.Shi
- Sedum drymarioides Hance
- Sedum dugueyi Raym.-Hamet
- Sedum dulcinomen G.L.Nesom
- Sedum duthiei Fröd.
- Sedum eastwoodiae (Britton) A.Berger – Red Mountain stonecrop
- Sedum ebracteatum Moc. & Sessé ex DC.
- Sedum ecalcaratum H.J.Wang & P.S.Hsu
- Sedum edwardsii (R.T.Clausen) B.L.Turner
- Sedum elatinoides Franch.
- Sedum elburzense Akhiani & Assadi
- Sedum emarginatum Migo
- Sedum × engadinense Brügger
- Sedum engleri Raym.-Hamet
- Sedum epidendrum Hochst. ex A.Rich.
- Sedum erici-magnusii Fröd.
- Sedum eriocarpum Sm.
- Sedum erlangerianum Engl.
- Sedum ermenekensis Yıld. & Dinç
- Sedum × erraticum Brügger
- Sedum erythrospermum Hayata
- Sedum euxinum 't Hart & Alpinar
- Sedum fanjingshanense C.D.Yang & X.Yu Wang
- Sedum farinosum Lowe
- Sedum feddei Raym.-Hamet
- Sedum fedtschenkoi Raym.-Hamet
- Sedum filipes Hemsl.
- Sedum fischeri Raym.-Hamet
- Sedum flaccidum Rose
- Sedum flavidum (Denton) B.L.Wilson & Zika
- Sedum formosanum N.E.Br.
- Sedum forreri Greene
- Sedum forrestii Raym.-Hamet
- Sedum fragrans 't Hart
- Sedum franchetii Grande
- Sedum frutescens Rose
- Sedum × fuereri Wein
- Sedum fui G.D.Rowley
- Sedum furfuraceum Moran
- Sedum fuscum Hemsl.
- Sedum fusiforme Lowe
- Sedum gagei Raym.-Hamet
- Sedum gattefossei Batt. & Jahand.
- Sedum giajae Raym.-Hamet
- Sedum glabrum (Rose) Praeger
- Sedum glaebosum Fröd.
- Sedum glassii Pérez-Calix
- Sedum glaucophyllum R.T.Clausen – cliff stonecrop
- Sedum globuliflorum R.T.Clausen
- Sedum glomerifolium M.G.Gilbert
- Sedum goldmanii (Rose) Moran
- Sedum gracile C.A.Mey.
- Sedum grammophyllum Fröd.
- Sedum grandipetalum Fröd.
- Sedum grandyi Raym.-Hamet
- Sedum greggii Hemsl.
- Sedum grisebachii Boiss. & Heldr.
- Sedum griseum Praeger
- Sedum guadalajaranum S.Watson
- Sedum guatemalense Hemsl.
- Sedum gypsicola Boiss. & Reut.
- Sedum gypsophilum B.L.Turner
- Sedum hakonense Makino
- Sedum hangzhouense K.T.Fu & G.Y.Rao
- Sedum havardii Rose – Havard's stonecrop
- Sedum heckelii Raym.-Hamet
- Sedum hemsleyanum Rose
- Sedum hengduanense K.T.Fu
- Sedum henrici-roberti Raym.-Hamet
- Sedum hernandezii J.Meyrán
- Sedum hintonii R.T.Clausen
- Sedum hintoniorum B.L.Turner
- Sedum hirsutum All.
- Sedum hispanicum L. – Spanish stonecrop
- Sedum hoi X.F.Jin & B.Y.Ding
- Sedum holei Raym.-Hamet
- Sedum holopetalum Fröd.
- Sedum hultenii Fröd.
- Sedum humifusum Rose
- Sedum hypogaeum J.Reyes, Brachet & O.González
- Sedum ichangensis Y.B.Wang
- Sedum ignescens Pino & Montesinos
- Sedum incarum (Ball) Pino
- Sedum ince 't Hart & Alpinar
- Sedum inconspicuum Hand.-Mazz.
- Sedum isidorum Pino
- Sedum jaccardianum Maire & Wilczek
- Sedum jahandiezii Batt.
- Sedum jaliscanum S.Watson
- Sedum japonicum Siebold ex Miq. – Tokyo sun stonecrop
- Sedum jarocho P.Carrillo & Jimeno-Sevilla
- Sedum jerzedowskii Pérez-Calix
- Sedum jiuhuashanense P.S.Hsu & H.J.Wang
- Sedum jiulungshanense Y.C.Ho
- Sedum jordanianum Dobignard
- Sedum jujuyense Zardini
- Sedum jurgensenii (Hemsl.) Moran
- Sedum keniense Y.D.Zhou, G.W.Hu & Q.F.Wang
- Sedum kiangnanense D.Q.Wang & Z.F.Wu
- Sedum kiersteadiae B.L.Wilson & R.E.Brainerd
- Sedum kimnachii V.V.Byalt
- Sedum kingdonii H.Ohba
- Sedum kotschyanum Boiss.
- Sedum koyuncui Yıld.
- Sedum kristenii J.Reyes, O.González & Etter
- Sedum kuntsunianum X.F.Jin, S.H.Jin & B.Y.Ding
- Sedum kwanwuense H.W.Lin, J.C.Wang & C.T.Lu
- Sedum laconicum Boiss. & Heldr.
- Sedum lagascae Pau
- Sedum lahovarianum Raym.-Hamet
- Sedum lampusae (Kotschy) Boiss.
- Sedum lanceolatum Torr. – lance-leaf stonecrop, lanceleaf stonecrop, spearleaf stonecrop
- Sedum lancerottense R.P.Murray
- Sedum latentibulbosum K.T.Fu & G.Y.Rao
- Sedum latifilamentum R.T.Clausen
- Sedum laxum (Britton) A.Berger – roseflower stonecrop
- Sedum leblancae Raym.-Hamet
- Sedum leibergii Britton – Leiberg stonecrop
- Sedum lenkoranicum Grossh.
- Sedum leptophyllum Fröd.
- Sedum leucocarpum Franch.
- Sedum liebmannianum Hemsl.
- Sedum lineare Thunb. – needle stonecrop
- Sedum lipingense R.B.Zhang, D.Tan & R.X.Wei
- Sedum litoreum Guss.
- Sedum longifuniculatum K.T.Fu
- Sedum longipes Rose
- Sedum longuetae Raym.-Hamet
- Sedum longyanense K.T.Fu
- Sedum luchuanicum K.T.Fu
- Sedum lucidum R.T.Clausen
- Sedum lumholtzii B.L.Rob. & Fernald
- Sedum lungtsuanense S.H.Fu
- Sedum luteoviride R.T.Clausen
- Sedum lutzii Raym.-Hamet
- Sedum lydium Boiss. – least stonecrop
- Sedum macdonaldii G.L.Nesom
- Sedum macdougallii Moran
- Sedum madrense S.Watson
- Sedum magae Raym.-Hamet
- Sedum magellense Ten.
- Sedum magniflorum K.T.Fu
- Sedum maireanum Sennen
- Sedum makinoi Maxim. – golden Japanese sedum
- Sedum marmorense Otting & R.E.Brainerd
- Sedum maurum Humbert & Maire
- Sedum melanantherum DC.
- Sedum mellitulum Rose
- Sedum mendozae (Glass & Cházaro) V.V.Byalt
- Sedum mesoamericanum P.Carrillo & Pérez-Farr.
- Sedum mexicanum Britton – Mexican stonecrop
- Sedum meyeri-johannis Engl.
- Sedum meyranianum J.Metzg.
- Sedum microcarpum (Sm.) Schönland
- Sedum microsepalum Hayata
- Sedum microstachyum (Kotschy) Boiss. – small-spiked stonecrop
- Sedum millspaughii Raym.-Hamet
- Sedum minimum Rose
- Sedum mocinoanum Pérez-Calix
- Sedum modestum Ball
- Sedum moniliforme I.García & Costea
- Sedum monregalense Balb.
- Sedum mooneyi M.G.Gilbert
- Sedum moranense Kunth – red stonecrop
- Sedum moranii R.T.Clausen – Rogue River stonecrop
- Sedum morganianum E.Walther – donkey tail, burro tail
- Sedum morrisonense Hayata
- Sedum mucizonia (Ortega) Raym.-Hamet
- Sedum mukojimense Takuro Ito
- Sedum multicaule Wall. ex Lindl.
- Sedum multiceps Coss. & Durieu – pygmy Joshua tree, dwarf Joshua tree
- Sedum muscoideum Rose
- Sedum muyaicum K.T.Fu
- Sedum nagasakianum (H.Hara) H.Ohba
- Sedum nanchuanense K.T.Fu & G.Y.Rao
- Sedum nanifolium Fröd. – dwarf stonecrop
- Sedum nanlingense Yan Liu & C.Y.Zou
- Sedum nanum Boiss.
- Sedum napiferum Peyr.
- Sedum naviculare Rose
- Sedum neovolcanicum Pérez-Calix & I.García
- Sedum nevadense Coss.
- Sedum nevii A.Gray – Nevius' stonecrop
- Sedum niveum Davidson – Davidson's stonecrop
- Sedum nokoense Yamam.
- Sedum nothodugueyi K.T.Fu
- Sedum nudum Aiton
- Sedum nuttallii Torr. & E.James ex Eaton – yellow stonecrop
- Sedum oaxacanum Rose
- Sedum obcordatum R.T.Clausen
- Sedum oblanceolatum R.T.Clausen – oblongleaf stonecrop
- Sedum obtrullatum K.T.Fu
- Sedum obtusatum A.Gray – sierra stonecrop
- Sedum obtusipetalum Franch.
- Sedum ocuilense J.Meyrán
- Sedum oligocarpum Fröd.
- Sedum oligospermum Maire
- Sedum onychopetalum Fröd.
- Sedum orbatum Moran & J.Meyrán
- Sedum oreades (Decne.) Raym.-Hamet
- Sedum oreganum Nutt. – Oregon stonecrop
- Sedum oregonense (S.Watson) M.E.Peck – cream stonecrop
- Sedum oteroi Moran
- Sedum oxycoccoides Rose
- Sedum oxypetalum Kunth
- Sedum pacense J.Meyrán
- Sedum pachucense (C.H.Thomps.) Praeger
- Sedum pachyphyllum Rose
- Sedum pagetodes Fröd.
- Sedum pallidum M.Bieb.
- Sedum palmeri S.Watson – Palmer's stonecrop
- Sedum pampaninii Raym.-Hamet
- Sedum papillicaulum G.L.Nesom
- Sedum paradisum (Denton) Denton ex B.L.Wilson – Canyon Creek stonecrop
- Sedum parvisepalum Yamam.
- Sedum parvum Hemsl.
- Sedum patens Zika
- Sedum × patrickii 't Hart
- Sedum pedicellatum Boiss. & Reut.
- Sedum pentandrum (Sharsm.) ined.
- Sedum pentapetalum Boriss.
- Sedum pentastamineum R.T.Clausen
- Sedum perezdelarosae Jimeno-Sevilla
- Sedum perpusillum Hook.f. & Thomson
- Sedum perrotii Raym.-Hamet
- Sedum peruvianum A.Gray
- Sedum phyllanthum H.Lév. & Vaniot
- Sedum piaxtlaense J.Reyes, Etter & Kristen
- Sedum piloshanense Fröd.
- Sedum planifolium K.T.Fu
- Sedum platysepalum Franch.
- Sedum plumbizincicola X.H.Guo & S.B.Zhou ex L.H.Wu
- Sedum polystriatum R.T.Clausen
- Sedum polytrichoides Hemsl.
- Sedum porphyranthes J.Reyes, Brachet & O.González
- Sedum pososepalum Fröd.
- Sedum potosinum Rose
- Sedum praealtum A.DC. – greater Mexican stonecrop, green cockscomb
- Sedum × praegeri (Fröd.) Afferni
- Sedum praesidis Runemark & Greuter
- Sedum prasinopetalum Fröd.
- Sedum pratoalpinum Fröd.
- Sedum pringlei S.Watson
- Sedum przewalskii Maxim.
- Sedum pseudomulticaule H.Ohba
- Sedum pseudosubtile H.Hara
- Sedum pubescens Vahl
- Sedum pulchellum Michx. – widow's-cross
- Sedum pulvinatum R.T.Clausen
- Sedum pumilum Benth.
- Sedum purdomii W.W.Sm.
- Sedum pusillum Michx. – granite stonecrop
- Sedum pyriseminum Pérez-Calix
- Sedum quadripetalum R.T.Clausen
- Sedum quevae Raym.-Hamet
- Sedum radiatum S.Watson – granite stonecrop
- Sedum ramentaceum K.T.Fu
- Sedum raramuri J.Metzg.
- Sedum raymondi Fröd.
- Sedum reniforme (H.Jacobsen) Thiede & 't Hart
- Sedum renzopalmae Pino
- Sedum reptans R.T.Clausen
- Sedum retusum Hemsl.
- Sedum rhodocarpum Rose
- Sedum roberti Veldkamp
- Sedum robertsianum Alexander
- Sedum roborowskii Maxim.
- Sedum rosthornianum Diels
- Sedum rubens L.
- Sedum rubiginosum Zika & B.L.Wilson
- Sedum rupicola G.N.Jones – curvedleaf stonecrop
- Sedum rupifragum Koidz.
- Sedum ruwenzoriense Baker f.
- Sedum sagittipetalum Fröd.
- Sedum salazarii J.Reyes & O.González
- Sedum salvadorense Standl.
- Sedum samium Runemark & Greuter
- Sedum sanhedrinum A.Berger
- Sedum sarmentosum Bunge – stringy stonecrop
- Sedum sasakii Hayata
- Sedum satumense Hatus.
- Sedum schizolepis Fröd.
- Sedum scopulinum (Rose) Moran
- Sedum sedoides (Jacquem. ex Decne.) Pau
- Sedum seelemannii Raym.-Hamet
- Sedum sekiteiense Yamam.
- Sedum semilunatum K.T.Fu
- Sedum semiteres Rose
- Sedum sexangulare L. – tasteless stonecrop
- Sedum shigatsense Fröd.
- Sedum shitaiense Y.Zheng & D.C.Zhang
- Sedum sinforosanum J.Reyes, Etter & Kristen
- Sedum sinoglaciale K.T.Fu
- Sedum smallii (Britton) H.E.Ahles
- Sedum somenii Raym.-Hamet ex H.Lév.
- Sedum sorgerae Kit Tan & D.F.Chamb.
- Sedum spathulifolium Hook. – Broadleaf stonecrop, Colorado stonecrop
- Sedum spathulisepalum R.T.Clausen
- Sedum spiralifolium D.Q.Wang, D.M.Xie & Lu Q.Huang
- Sedum stahlii Solms – coral beads
- Sedum stefco Stef.
- Sedum stellariifolium Franch.
- Sedum stelliforme S.Watson – Huachuca Mountain stonecrop
- Sedum stenopetalum Pursh – wormleaf stonecrop, yellow stonecrop
- Sedum stimulosum K.T.Fu
- Sedum strobiliforme Niederle
- Sedum suaveolens Kimnach
- Sedum subgaleatum K.T.Fu
- Sedum subtile Miq.
- Sedum susannae Raym.-Hamet
- Sedum taiwanalpinum H.W.Lin, J.C.Wang & C.T.Lu
- Sedum tamaulipense G.L.Nesom
- Sedum tarokoense H.W.Lin & J.C.Wang
- Sedum tehuaztlense Moran & J.Meyrán
- Sedum tenellum M.Bieb.
- Sedum ternatum Michx. – woodland stonecrop
- Sedum tetractinum Fröd.
- Sedum tianmushanense Y.C.Ho & F.Chai
- Sedum tortuosum Hemsl.
- Sedum torulosum R.T.Clausen
- Sedum tosaense Makino
- Sedum treleasei Rose
- Sedum triactina A.Berger
- Sedum tricarpum Makino
- Sedum trichospermum K.T.Fu
- Sedum trichromum R.T.Clausen
- Sedum tristriatum Boiss. & Heldr.
- Sedum triteli Raym.-Hamet
- Sedum trollii Werderm.
- Sedum trullipetalum Hook.f. & Thomson
- Sedum tsiangii Fröd.
- Sedum tsinghaicum K.T.Fu
- Sedum tsonanum K.T.Fu
- Sedum tuberculatum Rose
- Sedum tuberiferum Stoj. & Stef.
- Sedum tuberosum Coss. & Letourn.
- Sedum ulricae Fröd.
- Sedum ursi 't Hart
- Sedum urvillei DC.
- Sedum valens Björk
- Sedum versadense C.H.Thomps.
- Sedum versicolor (Raym.-Hamet) Coss. ex D.Prain
- Sedum victorianum C.-A.Jansson
- Sedum villosum L. – hairy stonecrop, purple stonecrop
- Sedum vinicolor S.Watson
- Sedum wangii S.H.Fu
- Sedum wannanense X.H.Guo, X.P.Zhang & X.H.Chen
- Sedum weberbaueri (Diels) Thiede & 't Hart
- Sedum wenchuanense S.H.Fu
- Sedum wilczekianum Font Quer
- Sedum wilsonii Fröd.
- Sedum woronowii Raym.-Hamet
- Sedum wrightii A.Gray – Wright's stonecrop
- Sedum yildizianum Sümbül
- Sedum yvesii Raym.-Hamet
- Sedum zentaro-tashiroi Makino

== Formerly placed here ==
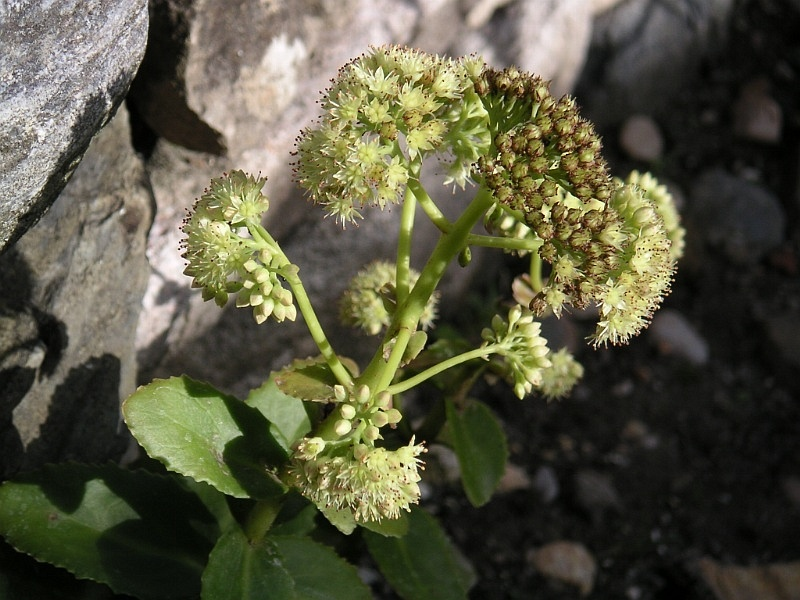
Hylotelephium telephium ssp. maximum, formerly placed in Sedum

Now in Dudleya:

- Dudleya caespitosa (as S. cotyledon)
- Dudleya edulis (as S. edule)

Now in Hylotelephium:

- Hylotelephium spectabile (as S. spectabile)
- Hylotelephium telephioides (as S. telephioides)

Now in Rhodiola:

- Rhodiola rhodantha (as S. rhodanthum)
- Rhodiola rosea (as S. rhodiola, S. roanense, S. rosea)
- Rhodiola pachyclados ( S. pachyclados)

== Bibliography ==
- Nikulin, Vyacheslav Yu.; Gontcharova, Svetlana B.; Stephenson, Ray; Gontcharov, Andrey A. (September 2016). "Phylogenetic relationships between Sedum L. and related genera (Crassulaceae) based on ITS rDNA sequence comparisons". Flora. 224: 218–229. Bibcode:2016FMDFE.224..218N. doi:10.1016/j.flora.2016.08.003.
