= Donkey Tail =

Donkey Tail can refer to:

- Euphorbia myrsinites, a plant
- Sedum morganianum, another plant
- Donkey's Tail (Russian: Ослиный хвост, Osliniy khvost), a group of Russian Futurist artists in the early 1910s. Marc Chagall was a notable member.
