= Mossy Stonecrop =

Mossy Stonecrop may refer to:

- Crassula tillaea
- Sedum acre
- Sedum lydium
