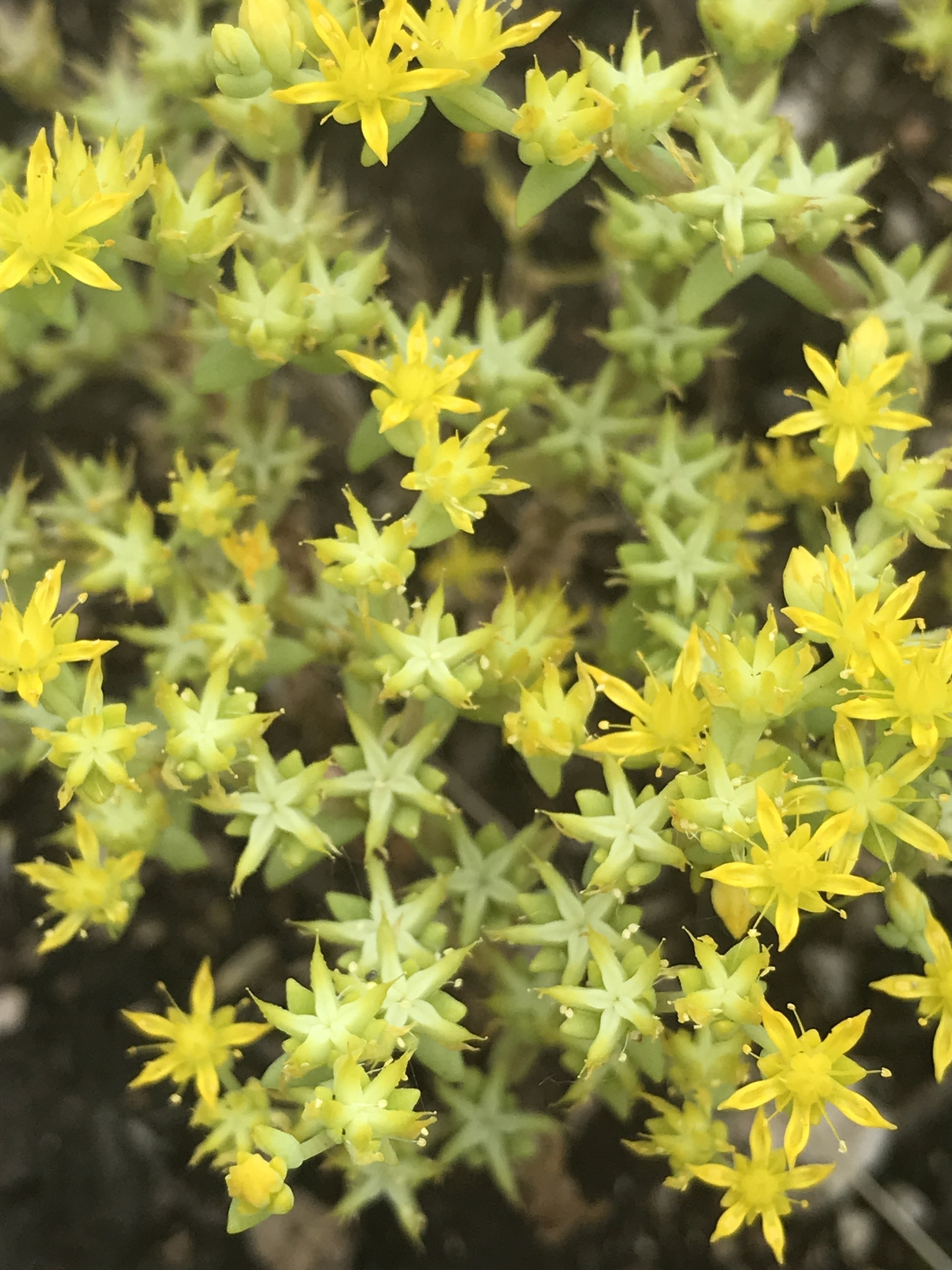
- Near Moffat, Texas

Scientific classification
- Kingdom: Plantae
- Clade: Tracheophytes
- Clade: Angiosperms
- Clade: Eudicots
- Order: Saxifragales
- Family: Crassulaceae
- Genus: Sedum
- Species: S. nuttallii

Binomial name
- Sedum nuttallii Torr. & E.James ex Eaton

Synonyms
- Sedum nuttallianum Raf.; Sedum sparsiflorum Nutt.; Sedum torreyi G.Don

= Sedum nuttallii =

Species of plant

Sedum nuttallii, the yellow stonecrop (a name it shares with other members of its genus), is a species of flowering plant in the family Crassulaceae, native to the central United States. An annual, it is typically found growing in thin soils that form over sandstone or granite.
