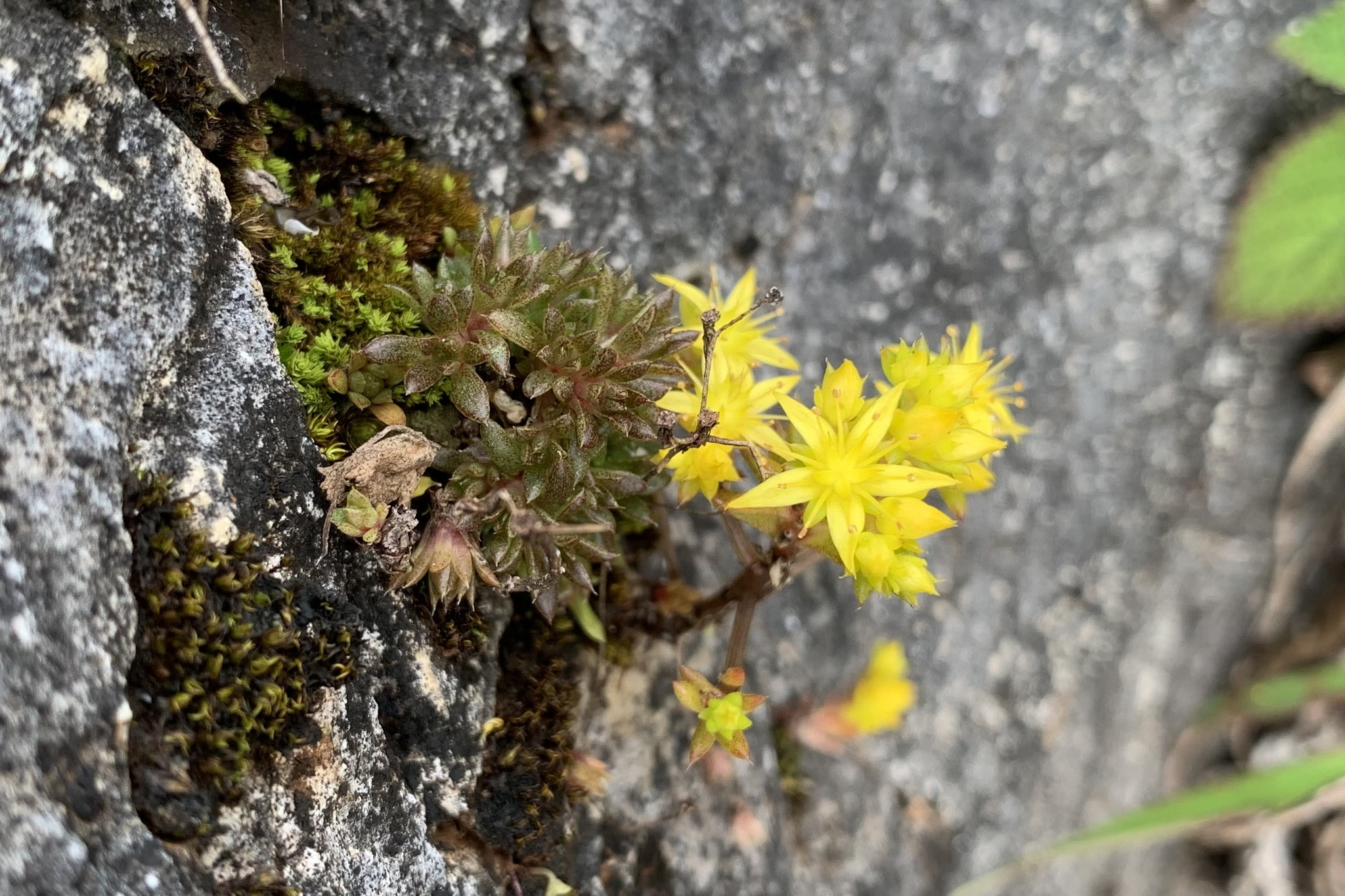

Scientific classification
- Kingdom: Plantae
- Clade: Tracheophytes
- Clade: Angiosperms
- Clade: Eudicots
- Order: Saxifragales
- Family: Crassulaceae
- Genus: Sedum
- Species: S. susannae

Binomial name
- Sedum susannae Raym.-Hamet

Varieties
- Sedum susannae var. macrosepalum K.T.Fu; Sedum susannae var. subgaleatum (K.T.Fu) K.T.Fu; Sedum susannae var. susannae

= Sedum susannae =

Species of plant

Sedum susannae is a species of plant belonging to the genus Sedum.
