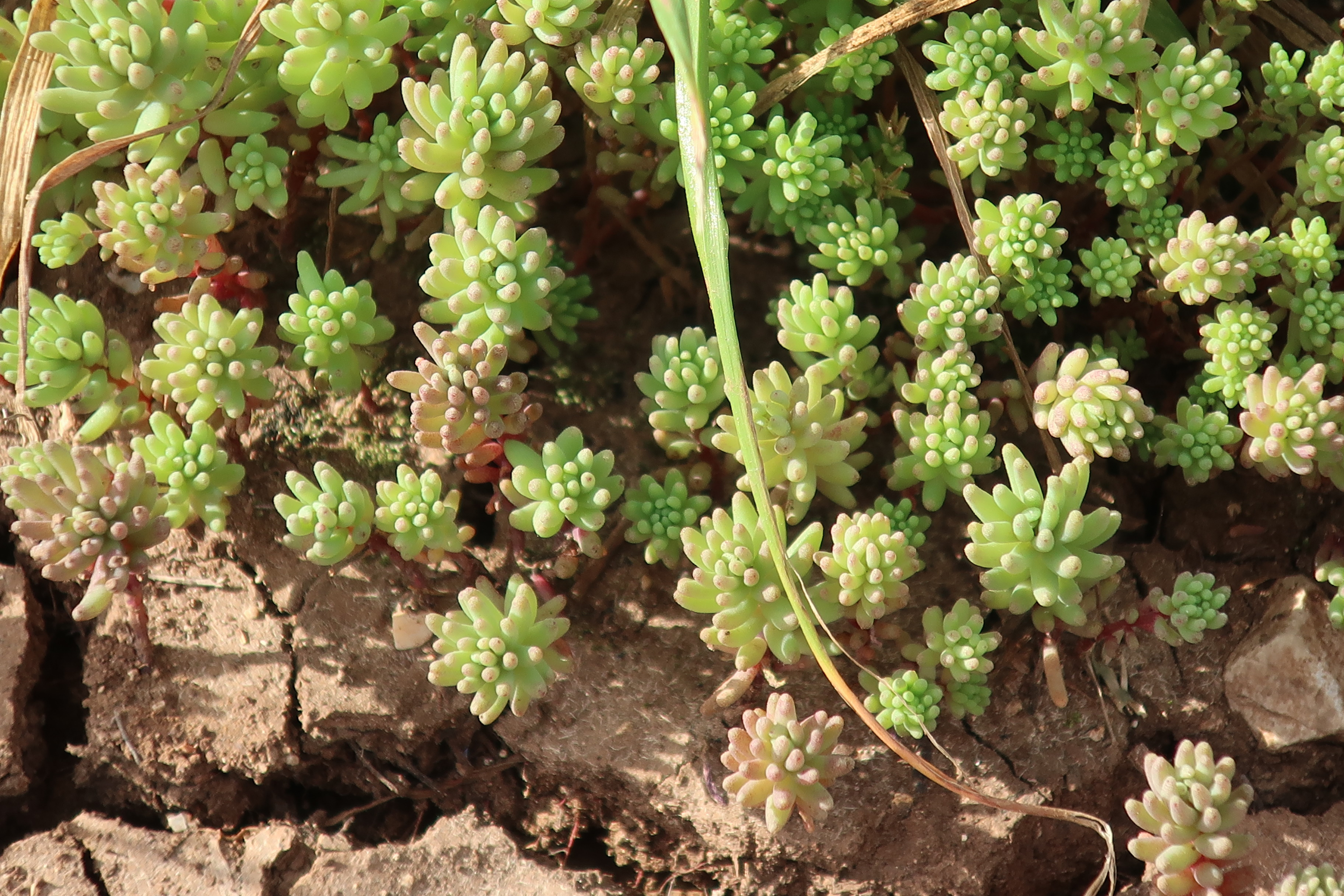
- Sedum microcarpum photographed in Israel

Scientific classification
- Kingdom: Plantae
- Clade: Tracheophytes
- Clade: Angiosperms
- Clade: Eudicots
- Order: Saxifragales
- Family: Crassulaceae
- Genus: Sedum
- Species: S. microcarpum

Binomial name
- Sedum microcarpum (Sibth. & Sm.) Schönland

Synonyms
- Crassula microcarpa Sm.; Telmissa microcarpa (Sm.) Boiss.-Schönland; Telmissa sedoides Fenzl

= Sedum microcarpum =

Species of succulent

Sedum microcarpum, commonly known as the small-fruited stonecrop, is a species of Sedum from the family Crassulaceae. It is native to Turkey, Lebanon, Israel, Palestine, Cyprus, and Syria. The plant is a short, bushy annual with white flowers. The leaves are succulent, narrowly oblong, and usually tinted red.

== Description ==
Sedum microcarpum is a small annual herb (5–10 cm), bearing succulent, pale green to red-tinged cylindrical stems and leaves. The leaves are shaped like tiny sausages, and are arranged in a grid or in pairs along the stems. Unlike the other annual species of the genus, there are no rosette-shaped leaves at the base of the plant. The flowers are tiny (2 mm), each with four white petals, borne in the axil between the stem and the leaves, meaning that the leaves and flowers do not decorate the surrounding stem. The non-dehiscent nutlike fruit is one-seeded, made up of three tiny follicles.

Sedum microcarpum blossoms after the first winter rains, between January and April; sepals 0.5 mm, obtuse; 1–2 mm white petals. Its leaves are alternate, cylindrical or terete. The plant grows on hard outcrops, often in shallow patches of soil on sunny rocky surfaces that quickly dry out in the spring. The life form is a Therophyte, in that they are often seen growing where there were once vernal pools, rock hollows and crevices which have been flooded by the winter rains and which dry out quickly in early spring.

== Distribution ==
Sedum microcarpum can be found all throughout the Mediterranean woodlands and shrublands, as also in semi-steppe shrublands.

== Gallery ==
Growing between rocks, Yukarıkaravaiz (Gaziantep, Turkey)

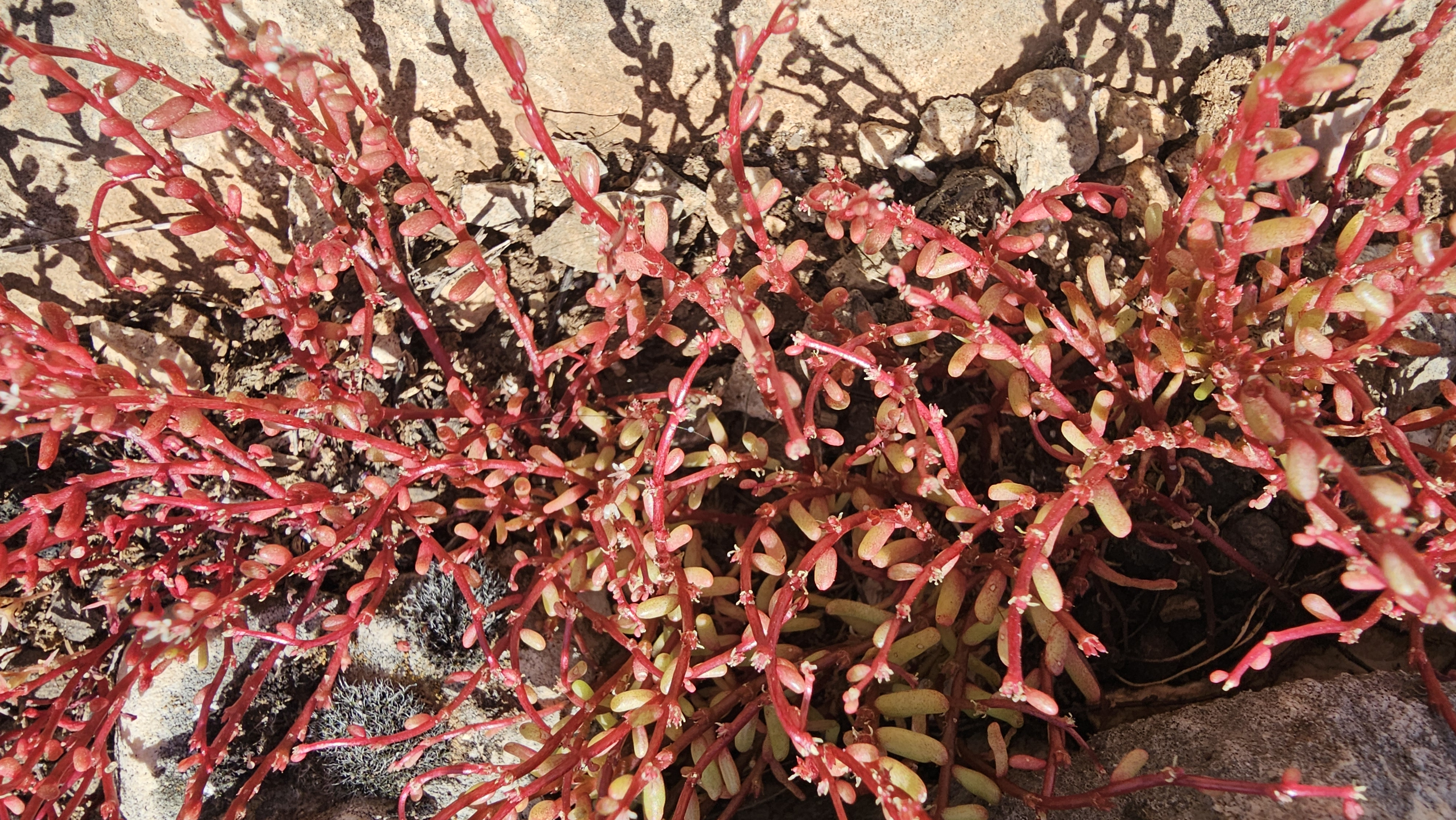
With green fruits, Yukarıkaravaiz (Gaziantep, Turkey)

Close-up of the fruits, Yukarıkaravaiz (Gaziantep, Turkey)

Bright red coloration, slightly glossy, Yukarıkaravaiz (Gaziantep, Turkey)
