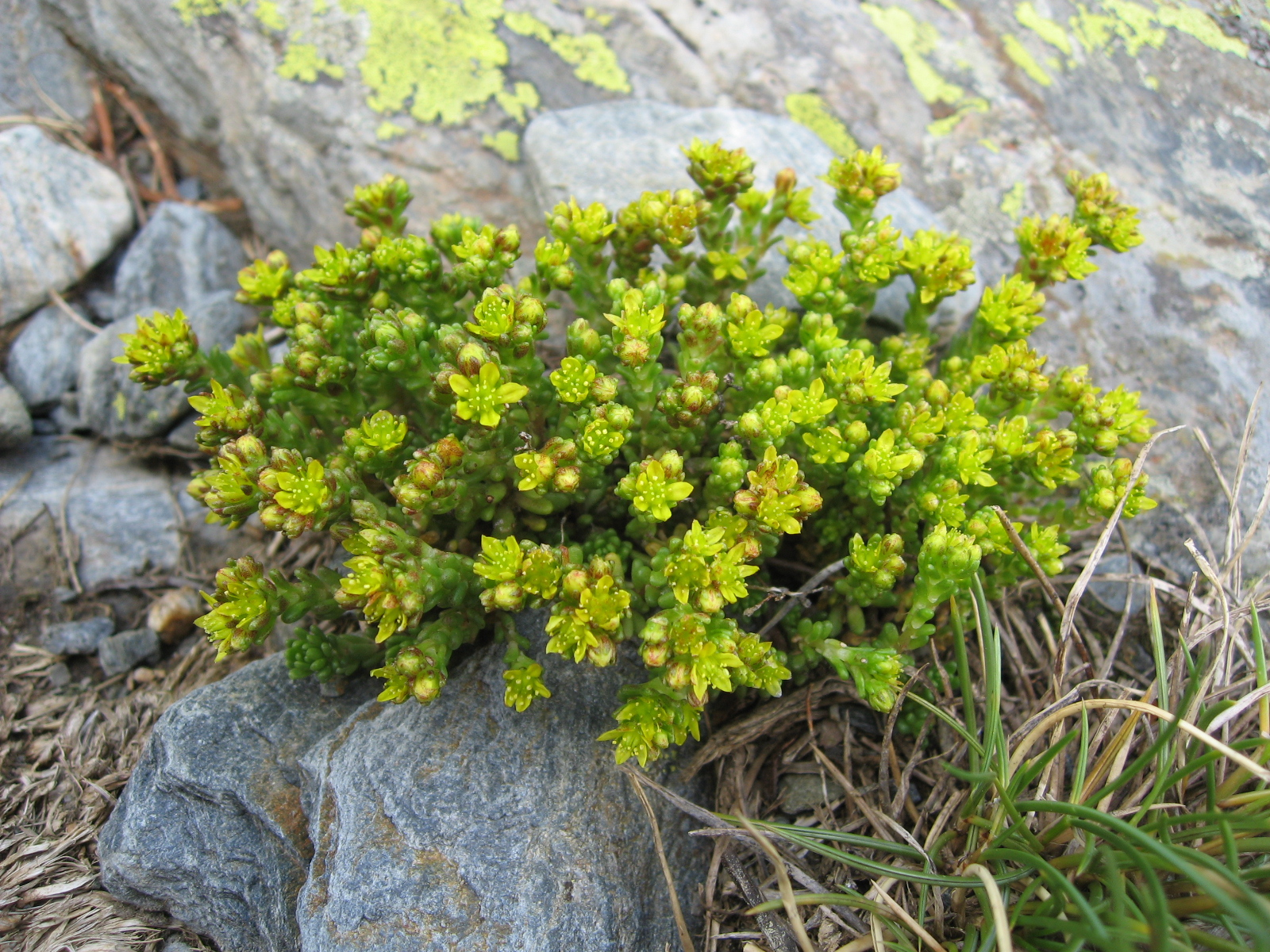

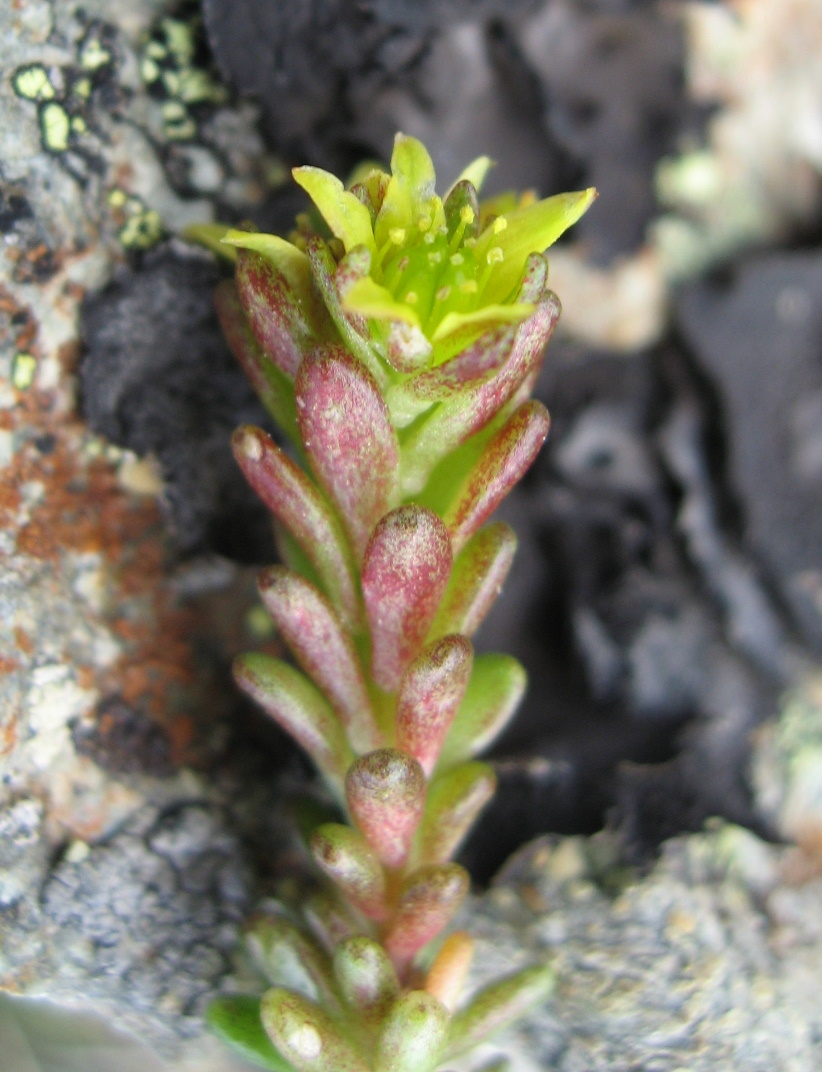

Scientific classification
- Kingdom: Plantae
- Clade: Tracheophytes
- Clade: Angiosperms
- Clade: Eudicots
- Order: Saxifragales
- Family: Crassulaceae
- Genus: Sedum
- Species: S. alpestre

Binomial name
- Sedum alpestre Vill.

= Sedum alpestre =

Species of flowering plant

Sedum alpestre is a species of flowering plant in the family Crassulaceae. Its native occurrence ranges from Europe (Portugal to the Balkan Peninsula) to North Turkey.

== Subtaxa ==
Two subspecies are accepted:

- Sedum alpestre subsp. alpestre
- Sedum alpestre subsp. erythraeum (Griseb.) 't Hart
