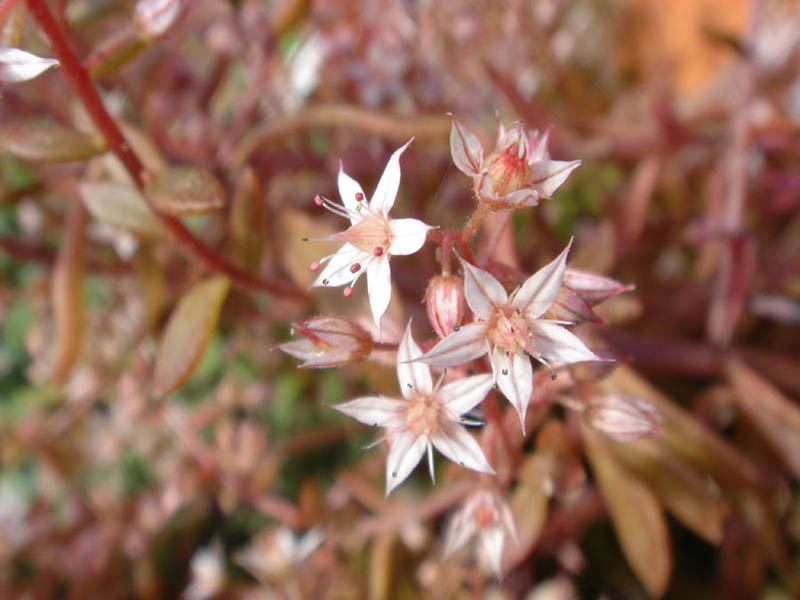
- Close-up of flowers
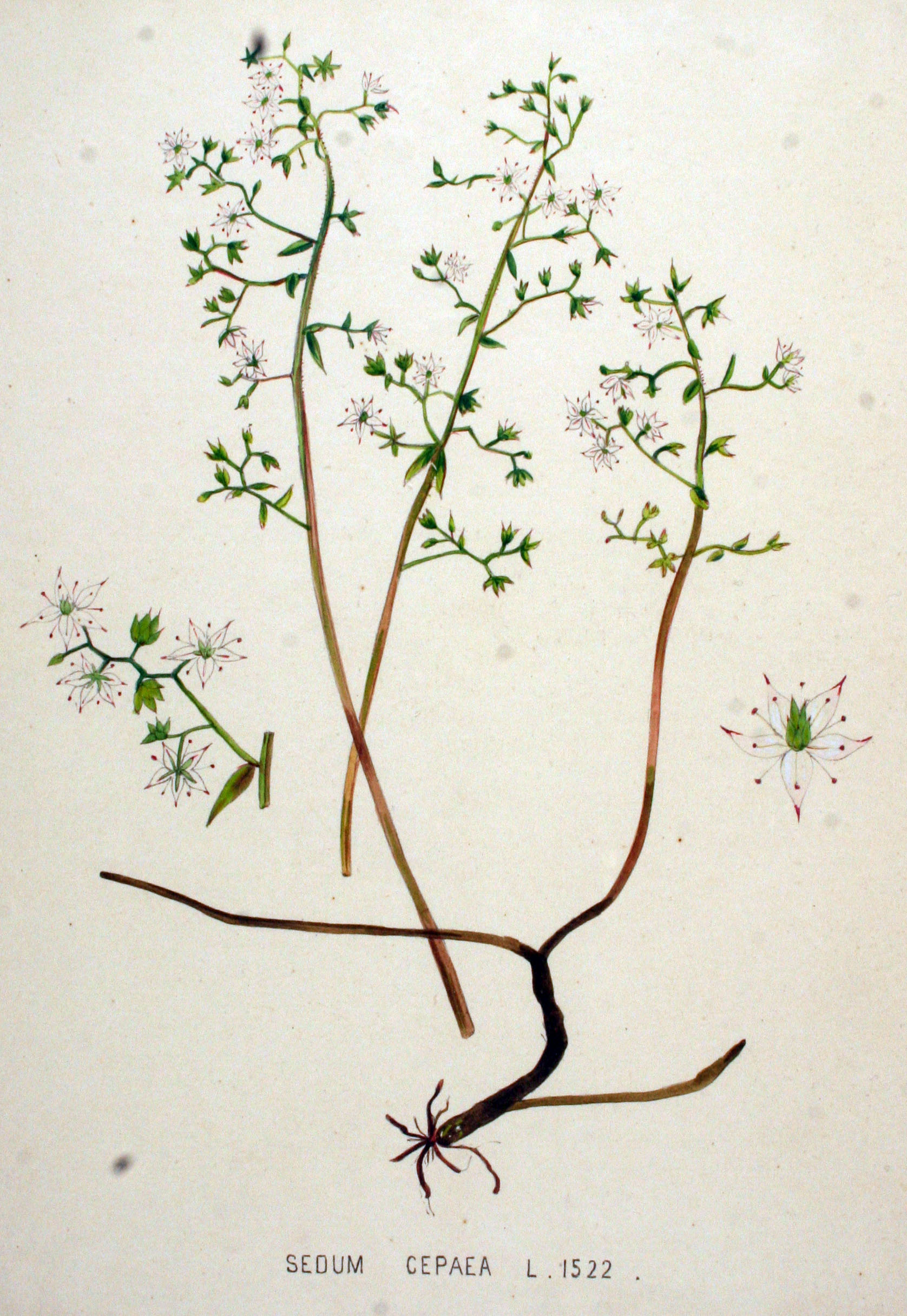
- Botanical illustration

Scientific classification
- Kingdom: Plantae
- Clade: Tracheophytes
- Clade: Angiosperms
- Clade: Eudicots
- Order: Saxifragales
- Family: Crassulaceae
- Genus: Sedum
- Species: S. cepaea

Binomial name
- Sedum cepaea L.

Synonyms
- List: Anacampseros cepaea (L.) Willd.; Cepaea caesalpini Fourr.; Sedum amani Post; Sedum calabrum Ten.; Sedum cepaea var. gallioides (All.) Rouy & E.G.Camus; Sedum cepaea var. gracilescens Maire & Weiller; Sedum cepaeum St.-Lag.; Sedum gallioides All.; Sedum paniculatum Lam.; Sedum schwarzii Werderm.; Sedum spathulatum Waldst. & Kit.; Sedum strictum K.Koch; Sedum tetraphyllum Sm.

= Sedum cepaea =

Species of plant

Sedum cepaea, the pink stonecrop, is a species of flowering plant in the family Crassulaceae. It has a Mediterranean distribution, but generally in the mountains, and extending into France as far north as Paris, and it has been introduced to Belgium, Germany, and, it seems, New Zealand. A bushy, succulent annual, it can reach 30 cm (12 in).

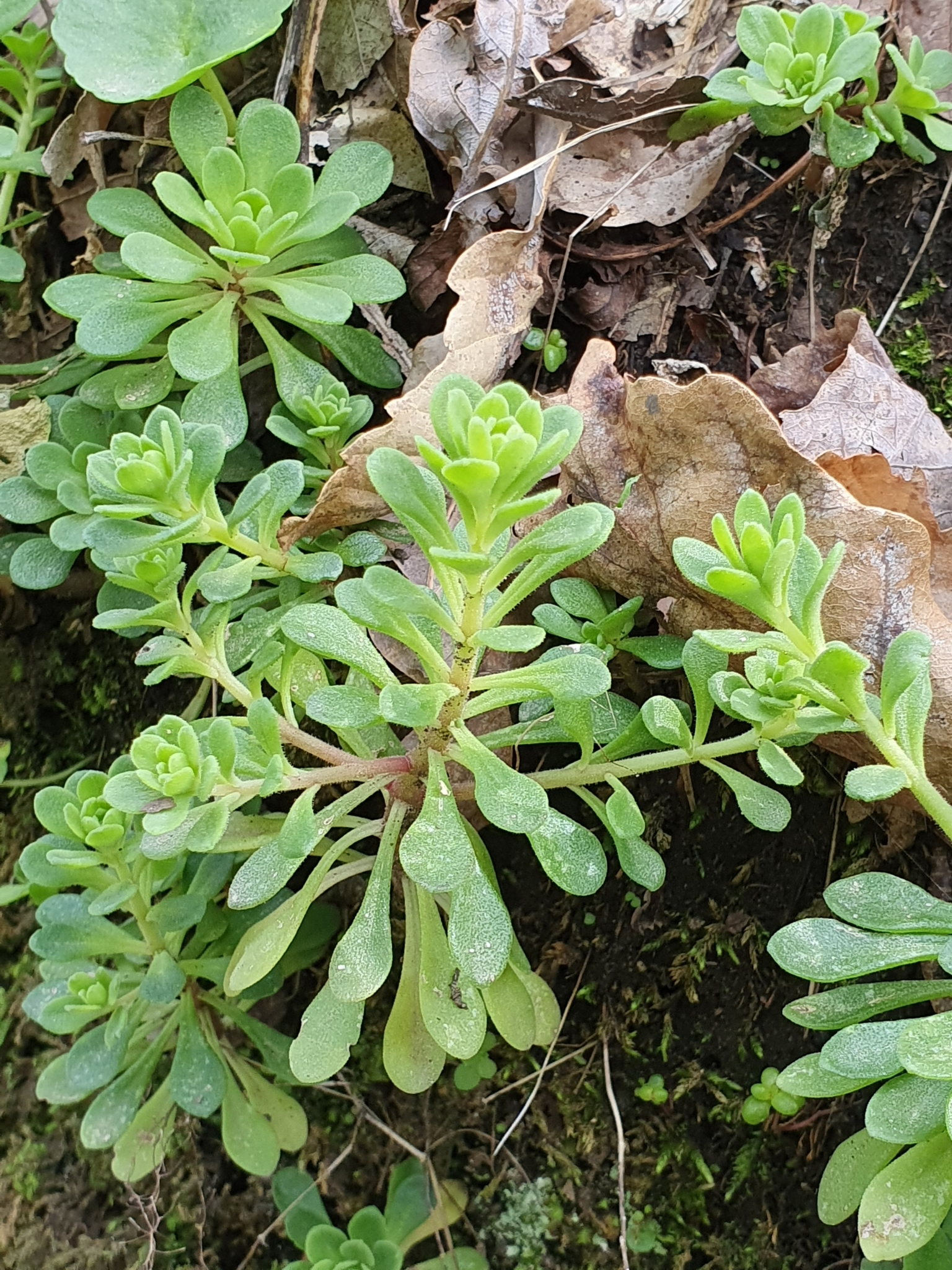
Foliage

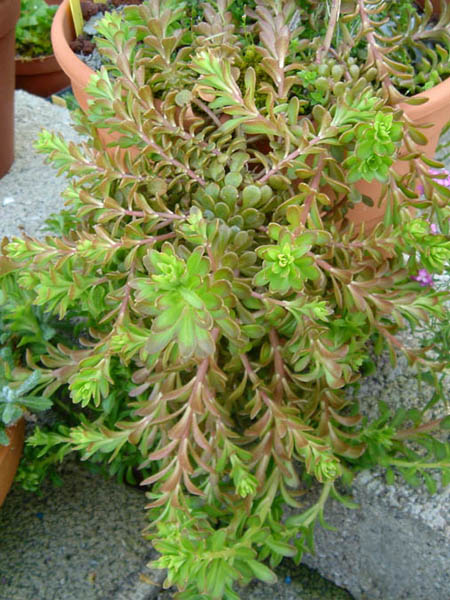
A potted specimen
