= Sedum suaveolens =

Scientific classification
- Kingdom: Plantae
- Clade: Tracheophytes
- Clade: Angiosperms
- Clade: Eudicots
- Order: Saxifragales
- Family: Crassulaceae
- Genus: Sedum
- Species: S. suaveolens

Binomial name
- Sedum suaveolens Kimnach

Species of plant

Sedum suaveolens is a low succulent plant native to Durango State, Mexico. It belongs to the Stonecrop Family (Crassulaceae). It has the highest chromosome count of any flowering plant (2n= 640). It was described in 1978.
