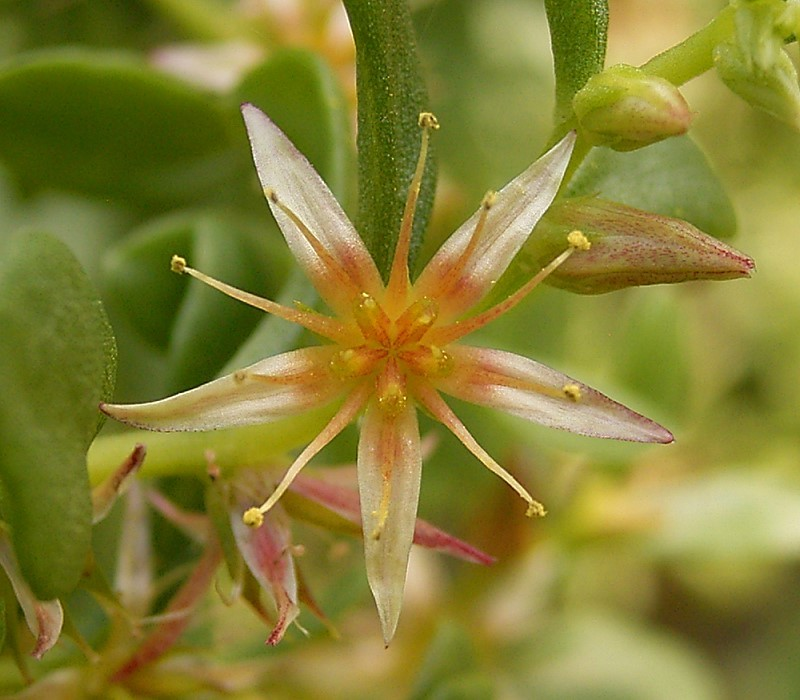
- Close-up of flower
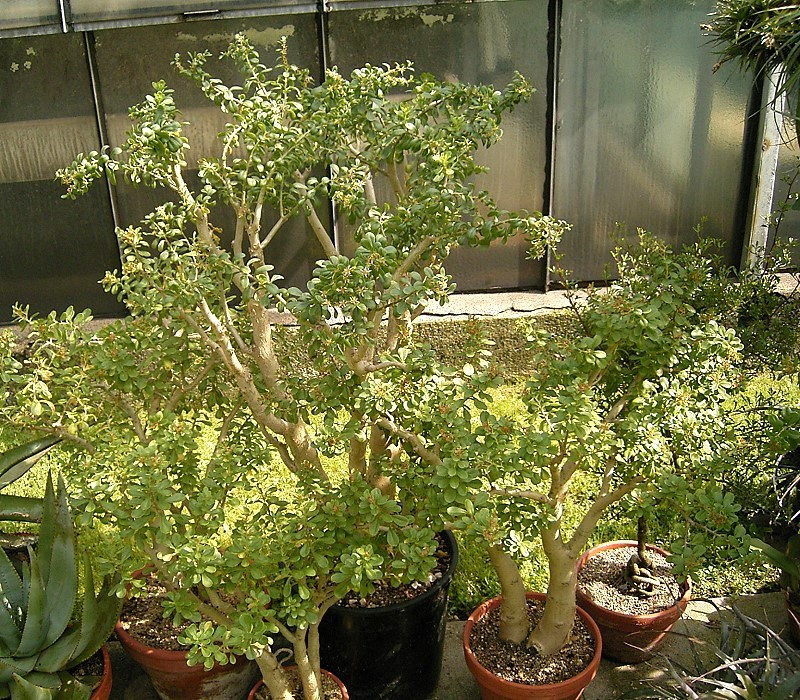
- Potted specimens

Scientific classification
- Kingdom: Plantae
- Clade: Tracheophytes
- Clade: Angiosperms
- Clade: Eudicots
- Order: Saxifragales
- Family: Crassulaceae
- Genus: Sedum
- Species: S. oxypetalum

Binomial name
- Sedum oxypetalum Kunth

Synonyms
- Sedum arborescens Sessé & Moc.; Sedum peregrinum Sessé & Moc.

= Sedum oxypetalum =

Species of plant

Sedum oxypetalum, the dwarf tree stonecrop, is a species of flowering plant in the family Crassulaceae, native to Mexico. A semi-woody succulent shrub reaching 0.6 m (2 ft), it has a tree-like growth form.
