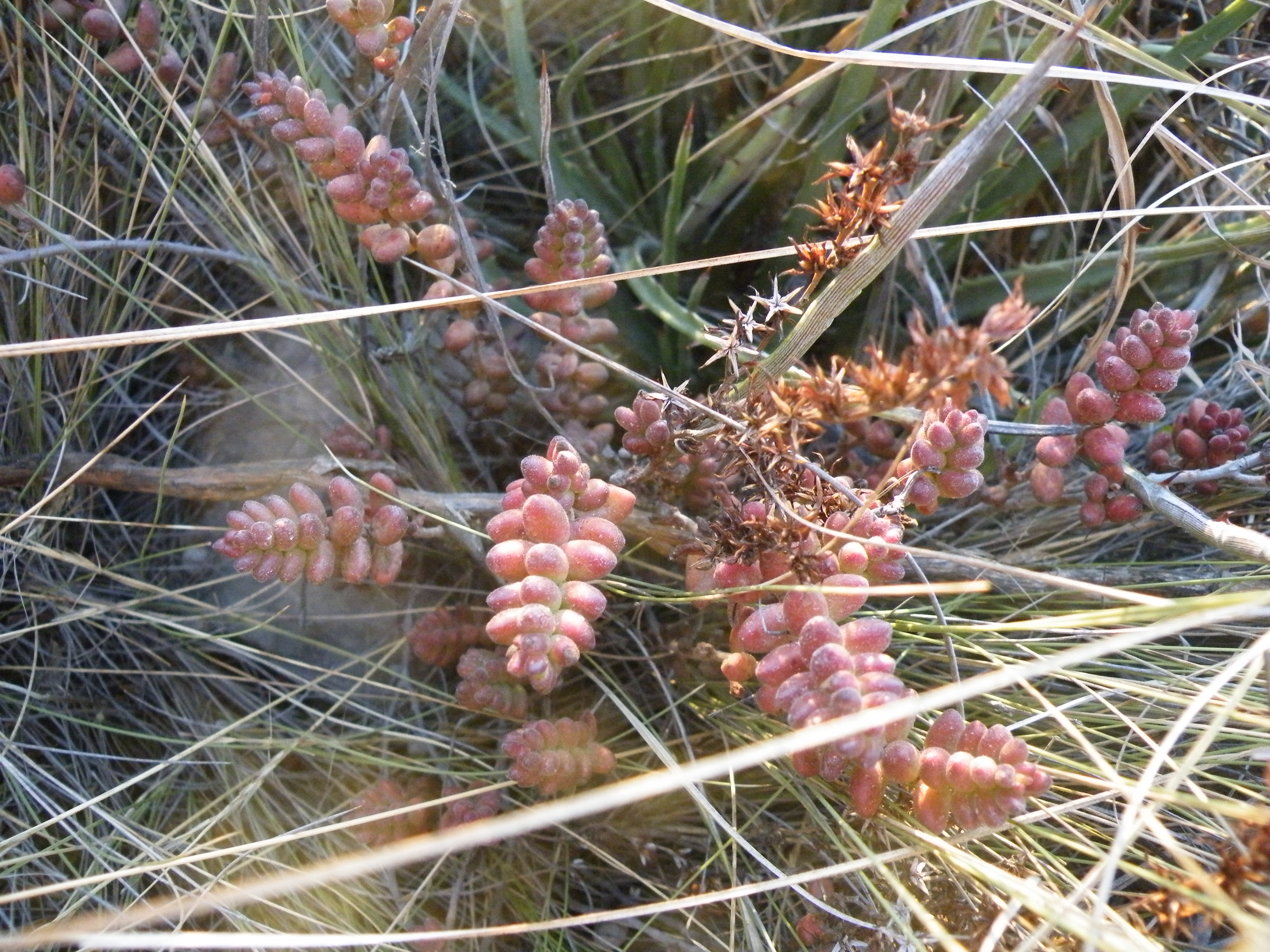
- In Cuacnopalan, Puebla, Mexico
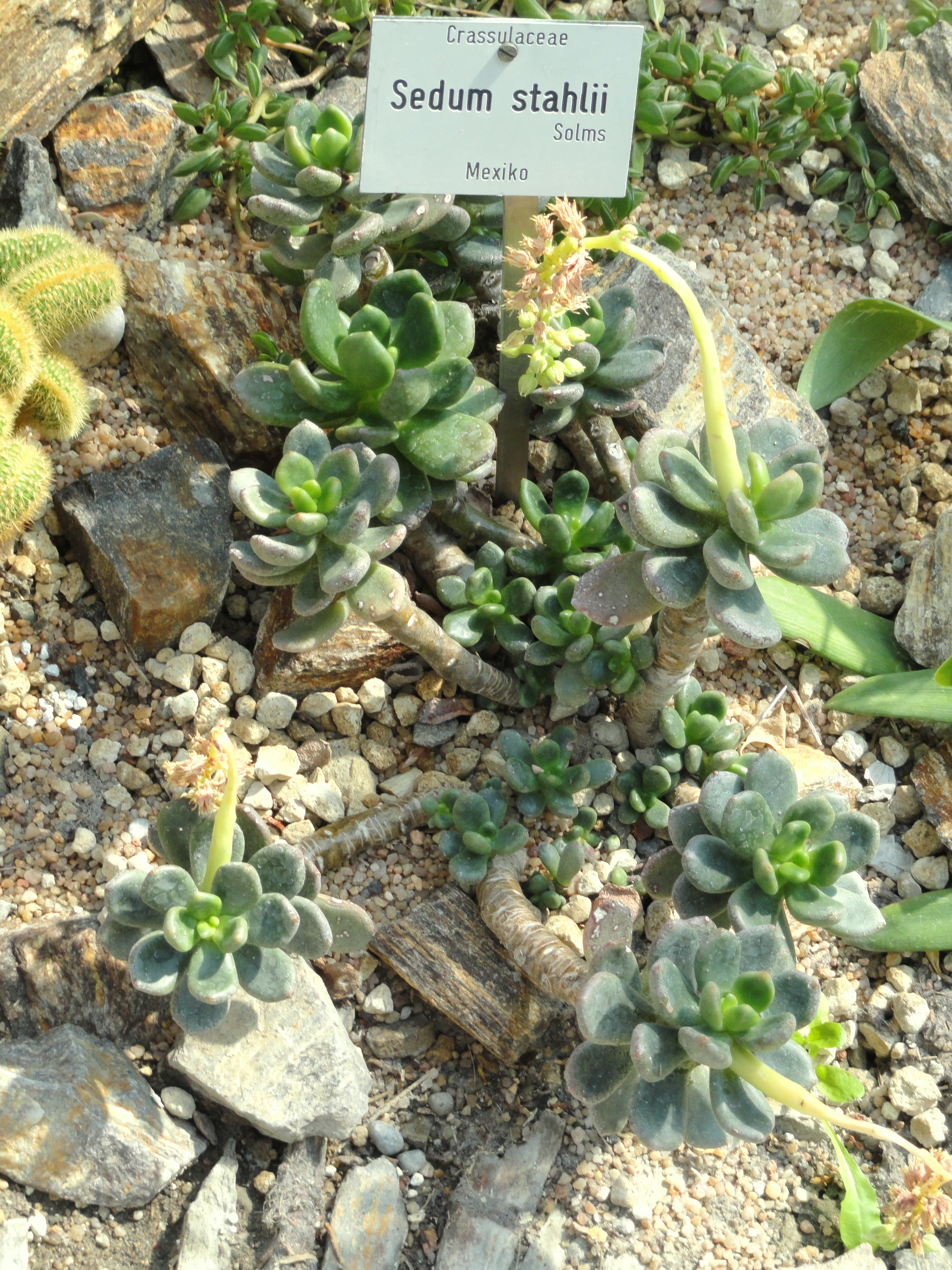
- At the Botanical Garden Munich-Nymphenburg

Scientific classification
- Kingdom: Plantae
- Clade: Tracheophytes
- Clade: Angiosperms
- Clade: Eudicots
- Order: Saxifragales
- Family: Crassulaceae
- Genus: Sedum
- Species: S. stahlii

Binomial name
- Sedum stahlii Solms

= Sedum stahlii =

Species of plant

Sedum stahlii, the baked beans or coral beads, is a species of flowering plant in the family Crassulaceae. It is native to seasonally dry areas of the Mexican states of Puebla, Veracruz, and Oaxaca. A succulent subshrub reaching 15 cm (6 in), it is available from commercial suppliers.

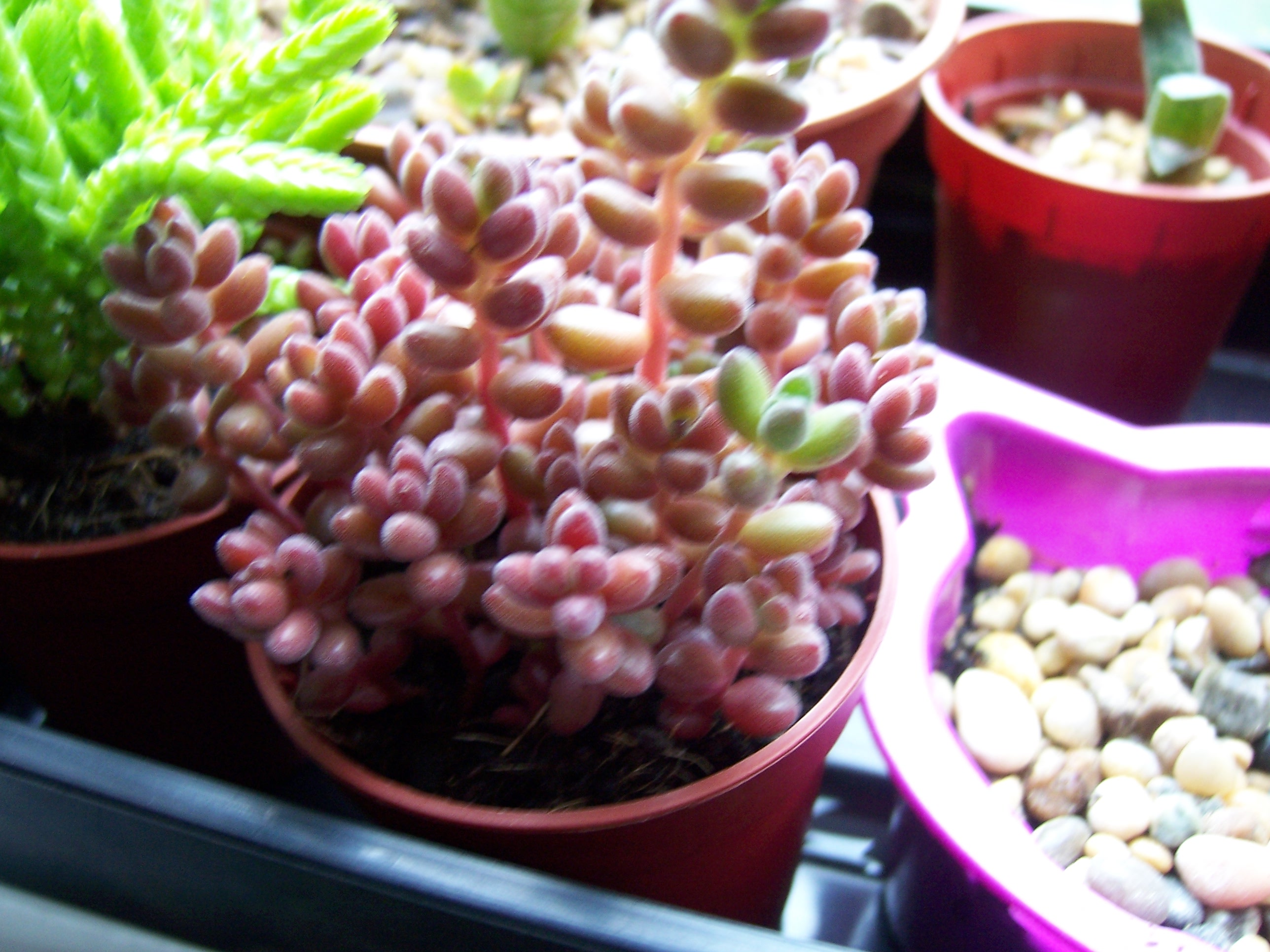
Potted specimen
