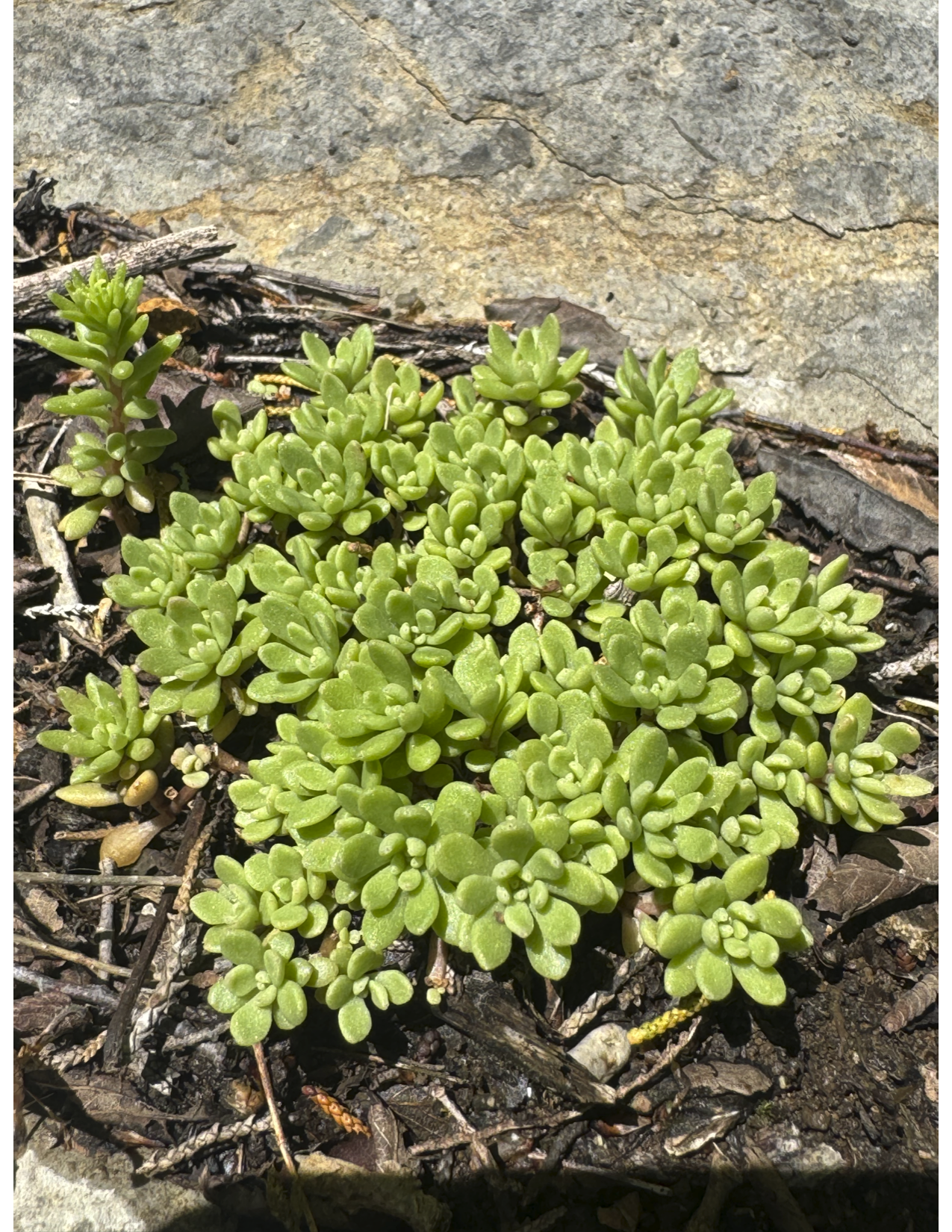
- Habit
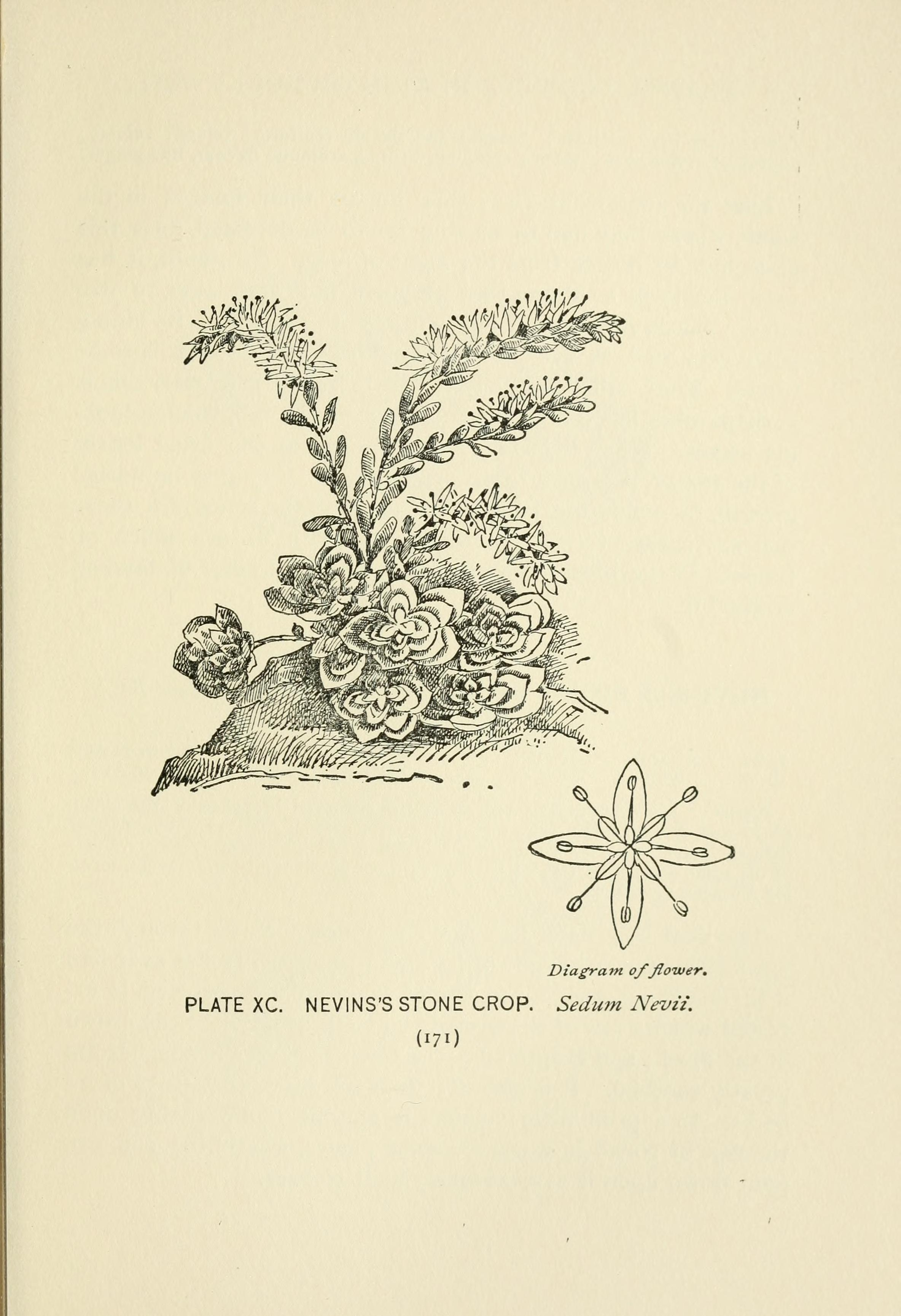
- Botanical illustration

Scientific classification
- Kingdom: Plantae
- Clade: Tracheophytes
- Clade: Angiosperms
- Clade: Eudicots
- Order: Saxifragales
- Family: Crassulaceae
- Genus: Sedum
- Species: S. nevii

Binomial name
- Sedum nevii A.Gray

Synonyms
- Sedum beyrichianum Mast.; Sedum nevii var. beyrichianum (Mast.) Praeger

= Sedum nevii =

Species of plant

Sedum nevii, or Nevius' stonecrop, is a species of flowering plant in the family Crassulaceae. It is native to the US states of Tennessee, Alabama, and Georgia, at elevations around 1,000 m (3,300 ft). A decumbent perennial reaching 10 cm (4 in), it is usually found growing on top of mosses and lichens, themselves growing on rocky crevices, ledges, and even talus typically composed of quartzite and gneiss. Among other characters, it can be distinguished from its congeners by its red anthers, and by the pronounced lips of the adaxial suture of its follicles.
