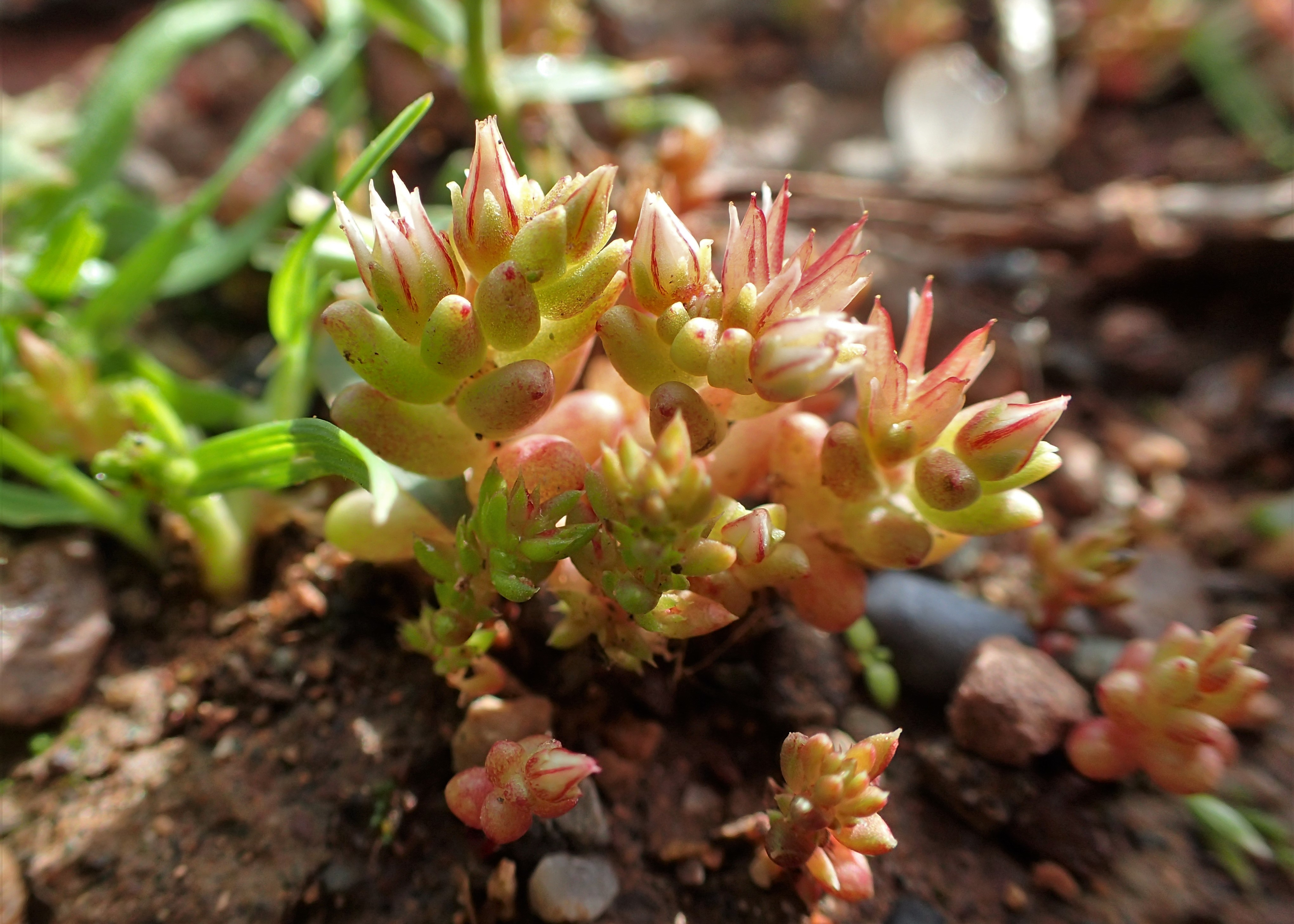

Scientific classification
- Kingdom: Plantae
- Clade: Tracheophytes
- Clade: Angiosperms
- Clade: Eudicots
- Order: Saxifragales
- Family: Crassulaceae
- Genus: Sedum
- Species: S. rubens

Binomial name
- Sedum rubens L.

Synonyms
- Sedum ibicense

= Sedum rubens =

Species of plant

Sedum rubens is a species of annual herb in the family Crassulaceae. They are succulent plants. They have a self-supporting growth form and simple, broad leaves. Individuals can grow to 5.4 cm.

== Sources ==
This article incorporates text from a free content work. Licensed under CC0 (license statement/permission). Text taken from Sedum rubens. Encyclopedia of Life.
