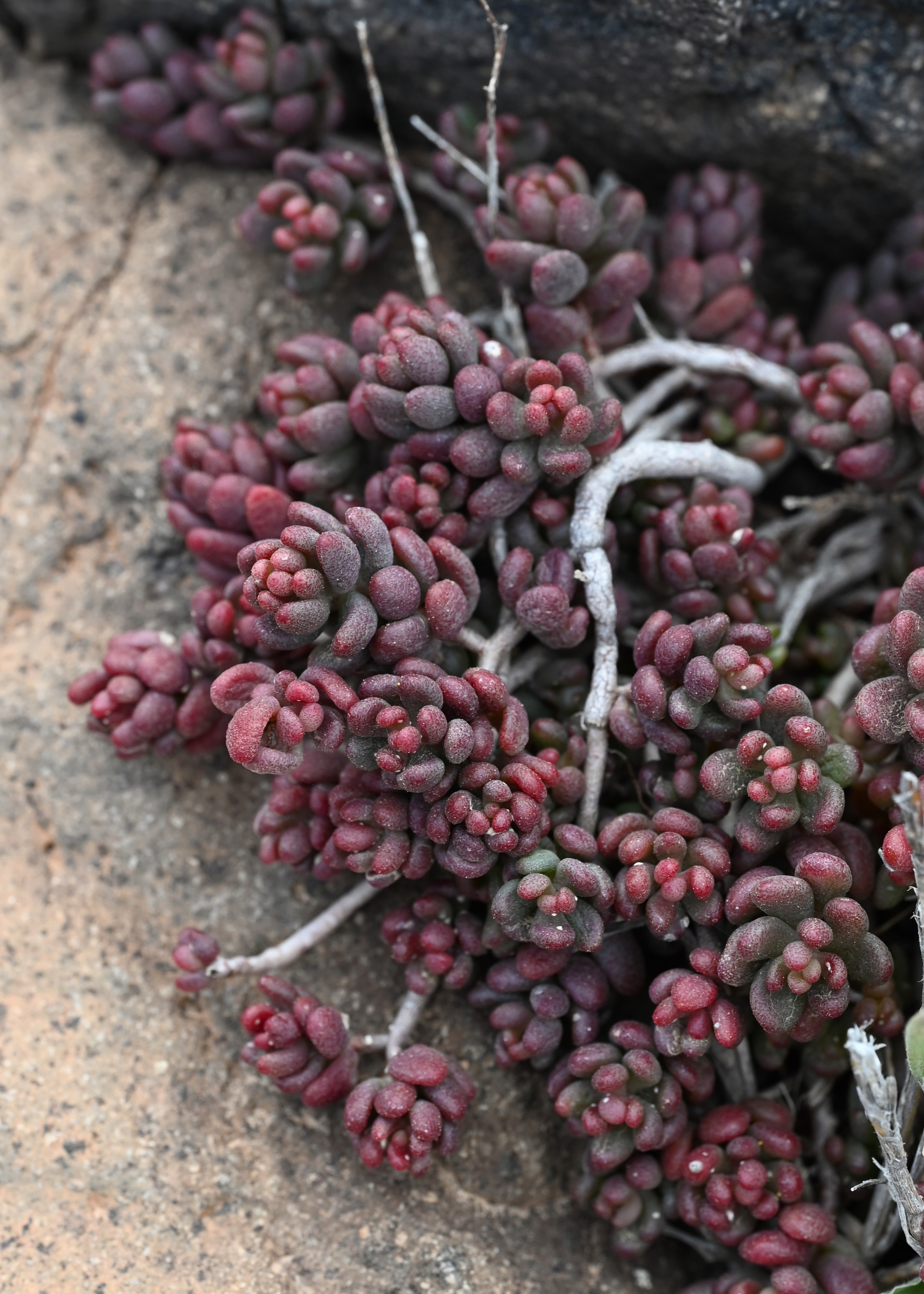

Scientific classification
- Kingdom: Plantae
- Clade: Tracheophytes
- Clade: Angiosperms
- Clade: Eudicots
- Order: Saxifragales
- Family: Crassulaceae
- Genus: Sedum
- Species: S. gypsicola

Binomial name
- Sedum gypsicola Boiss. & Reut.

Synonyms
- List: Oreosedum gypsicola (Boiss. & Reut.) Grulich; Sedum album var. gypsicola (Boiss. & Reut.) H.Lindb.; Sedum album subsp. gypsicola (Boiss. & Reut.) Maire

= Sedum gypsicola =

Species of flowering plant

Sedum gypsicola is a flowering plant of the genus Sedum in the family Crassulaceae.

== Taxonomy ==
Sedum gypsicola is related to Sedum album and has been considered a synonym by some authors, but it differs in having papillate leaves and a more restricted distribution. Apart to the more widely distributed nominate subspecies (subsp. gypsicola), Sicilian plants have been described as an endemic subspecies, subsp. trinacriae.

== Distribution and habitat ==
Sedum gypsicola grows on gypsum and limestone at altitudes of 0 to 2000 m. The species occurs in the Iberian Peninsula (Portugal and Spain), North Africa (Morocco, Algeria and Tunisia) and Sicily.
