= Sedum gypsophilum =

Scientific classification
- Kingdom: Plantae
- Clade: Tracheophytes
- Clade: Angiosperms
- Clade: Eudicots
- Order: Saxifragales
- Family: Crassulaceae
- Genus: Sedum
- Species: S. gypsophilum

Binomial name
- Sedum gypsophilum B.L.Turner

Species of succulent

Sedum gypsophilum is a species of succulent in the genus Sedum native to northeastern Mexico.

== Habitat ==
Turner, who named the species states that this species is unique because this species grows on gypsum. Also according to Turner this is likely the only gyposphilic species of Sedum observed in North America.
