= Sedum euxinum =

Conservation status
- Critically Endangered (IUCN 3.1)

Scientific classification
- Kingdom: Plantae
- Clade: Tracheophytes
- Clade: Angiosperms
- Clade: Eudicots
- Order: Saxifragales
- Family: Crassulaceae
- Genus: Sedum
- Species: S. euxinum

Binomial name
- Sedum euxinum 't Hart & Alpinar

Species of flowering plant

Sedum euxinum is a flowering plant of the genus Sedum in the family Crassulaceae endemic to northeastern Turkey.

== Habitat ==
Sedum euxinum grows on volcanic rock at altitudes of 1,650 to 1,850 m (5,410 to 6,070 ft).
