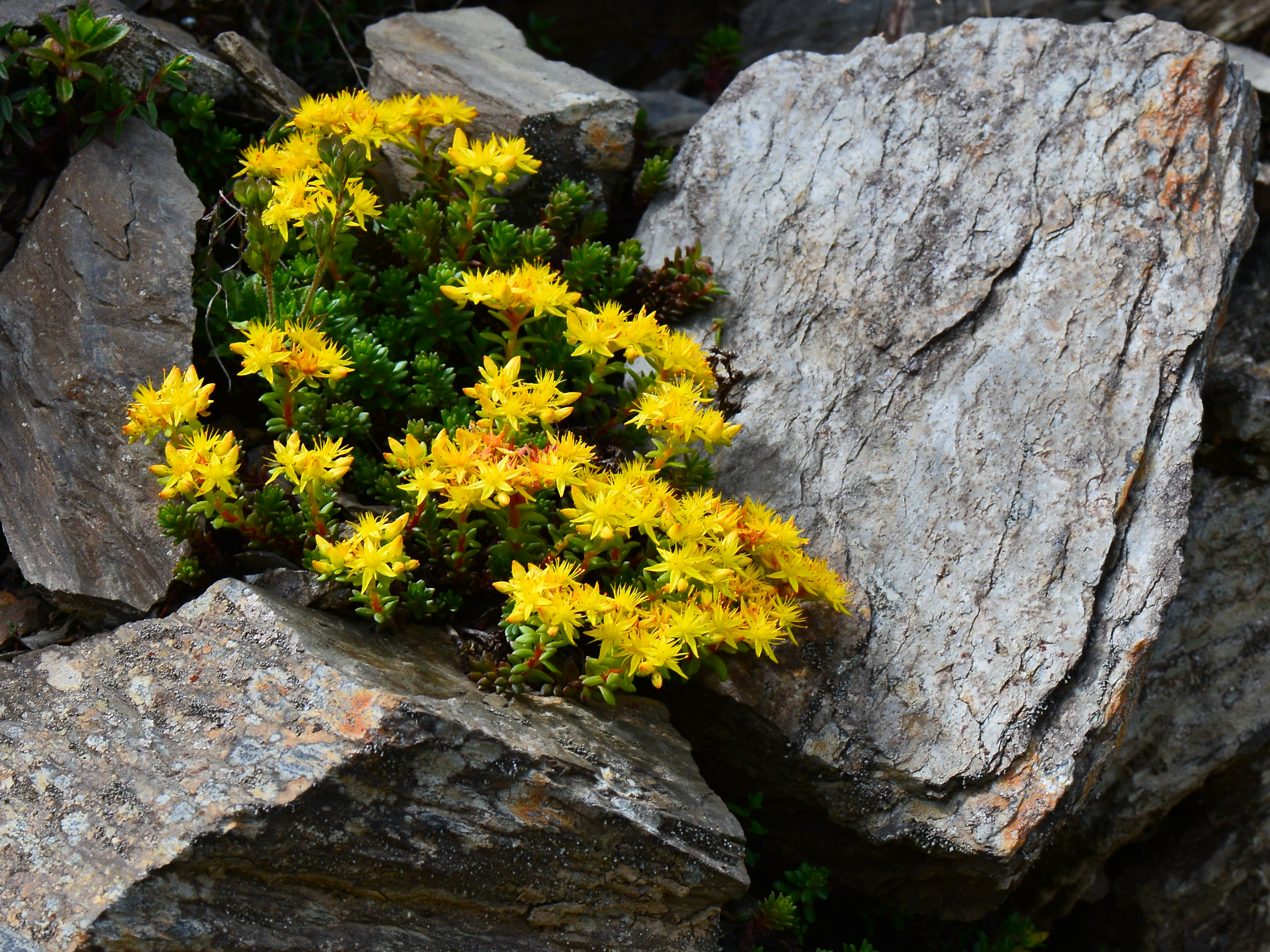
- On Mount Hehuan
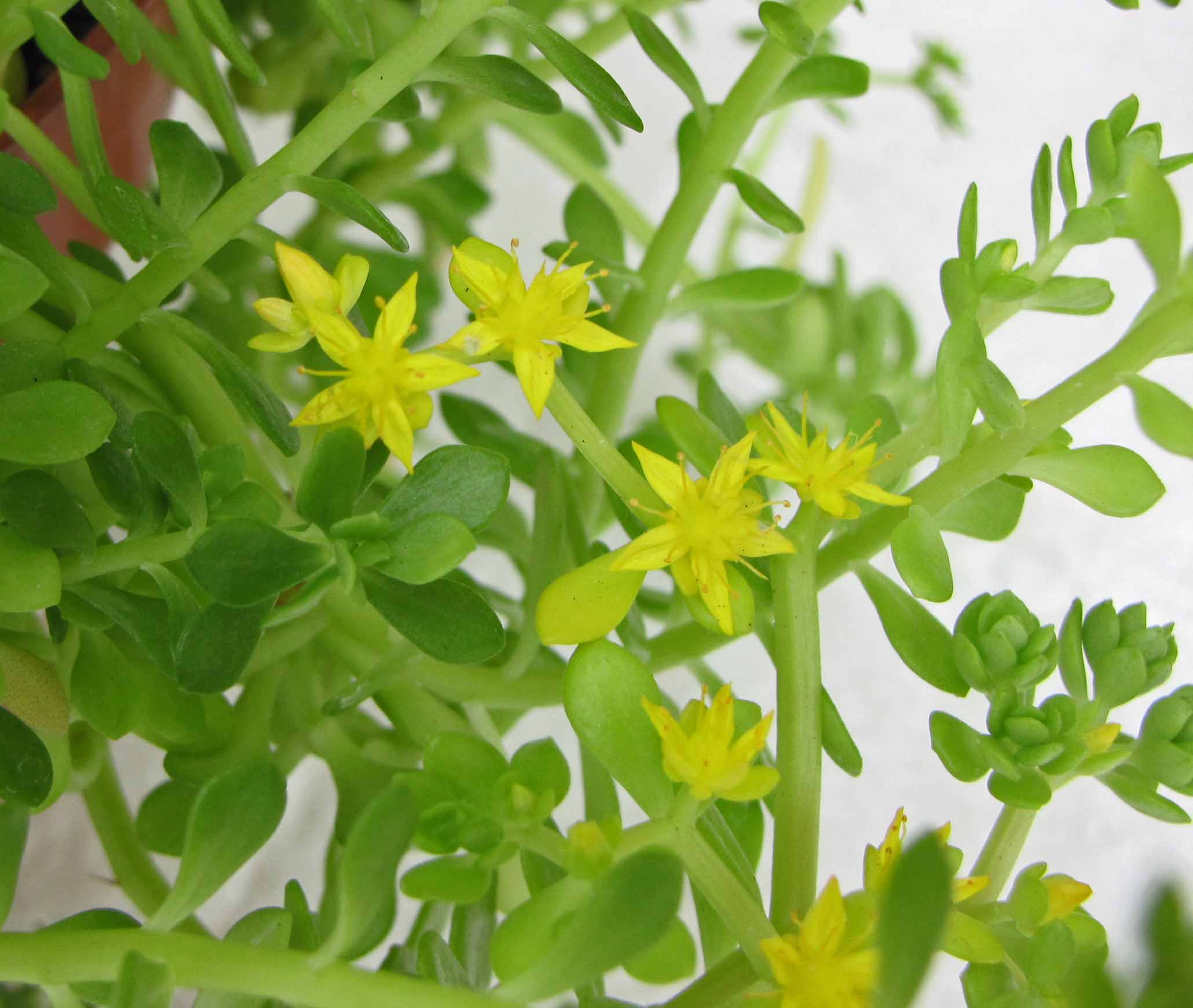
- At the Hong Kong Flower Show

Scientific classification
- Kingdom: Plantae
- Clade: Tracheophytes
- Clade: Angiosperms
- Clade: Eudicots
- Order: Saxifragales
- Family: Crassulaceae
- Genus: Sedum
- Species: S. morrisonense

Binomial name
- Sedum morrisonense Hayata

Synonyms
- Sedum cryptomerioides Bartlett & Yamam.

= Sedum morrisonense =

Species of plant

Sedum morrisonense is a species of flowering plant in the family Crassulaceae, native to Taiwan. (Note: Some sources erroneously give its common name as "Morrisor stonecrop", but Hayata named it for Mount Morrison (Yu Shan) on Taiwan.) A succulent perennial with yellow flowers, and reaching 10 cm (4 in) in height, it is found growing on mountains at elevations from 2,500 to 3,900 m (8,200 to 12,800 ft).
