= Sedum nanifolium =

Scientific classification
- Kingdom: Plantae
- Clade: Tracheophytes
- Clade: Angiosperms
- Clade: Eudicots
- Order: Saxifragales
- Family: Crassulaceae
- Genus: Sedum
- Species: S. nanifolium

Binomial name
- Sedum nanifolium Fröd.

Synonyms
- Sedum parvum subsp. nanifolium (Fröd.) R.T.Clausen

Species of plant

Sedum nanifolium, the dwarf stonecrop (a name it shares with other members of its genus), is a species of flowering plant in the family Crassulaceae, native to southwestern Texas and northeastern Mexico. A mat-forming perennial, it is found growing in limestone soils at 1,200 to 2,000 m (4,000 to 6,500 ft) in elevation.
