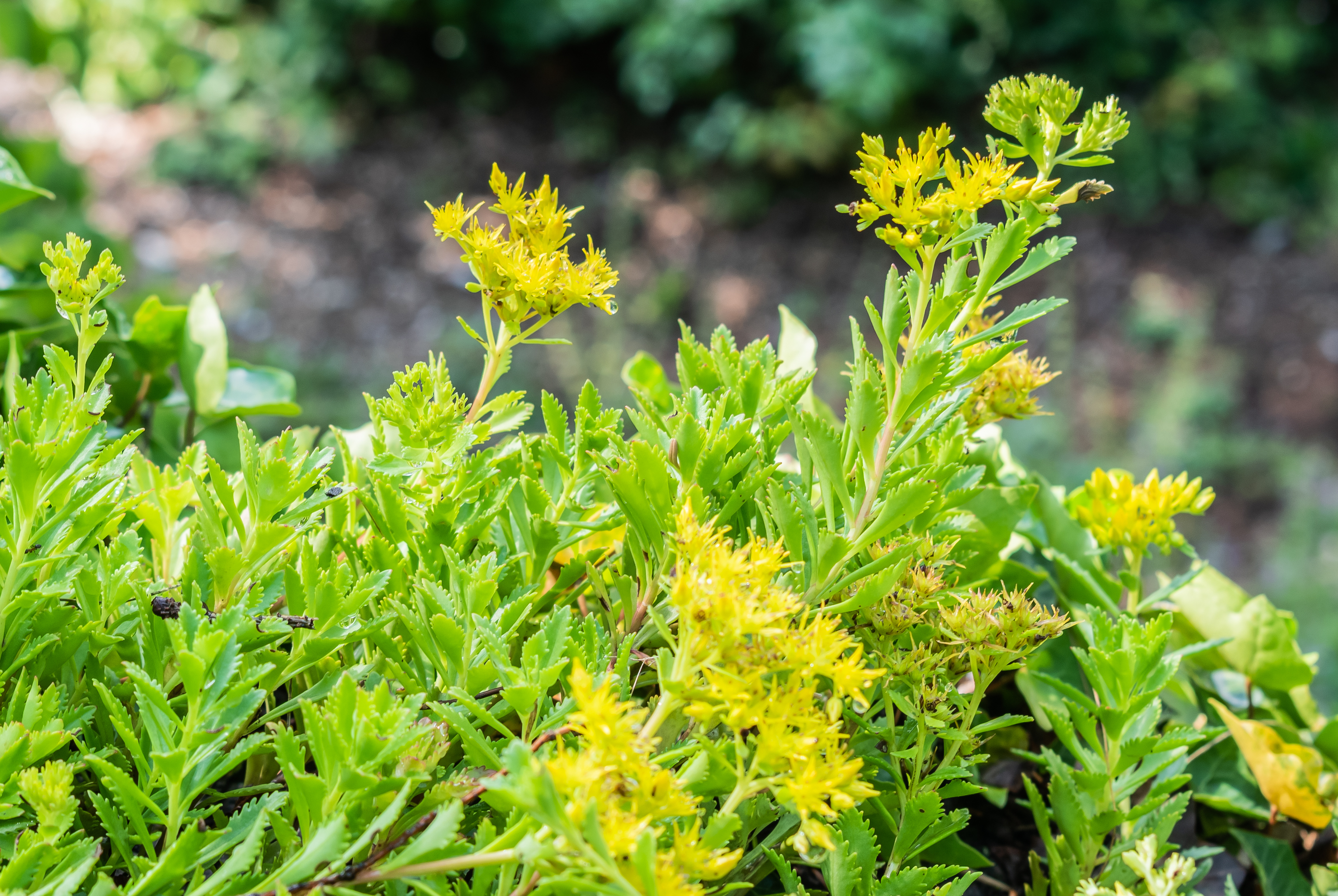

Scientific classification
- Kingdom: Plantae
- Clade: Tracheophytes
- Clade: Angiosperms
- Clade: Eudicots
- Order: Saxifragales
- Family: Crassulaceae
- Genus: Sedum
- Species: S. sekiteiense

Binomial name
- Sedum sekiteiense Yamam. (1926)

= Sedum sekiteiense =

Species of flowering plant

Sedum sekiteiense is a Taiwan-endemic species of the family Crassulaceae in the Sedum genus. It is also one of the few wild plants named after Shiding. The species was first published by Yoshimatsu Yamamoto in 1934 in the Supplementa Iconum Plantarum Formosanarum. Although its taxonomic status has been stable, little is known about its ecological habits due to its rarity, limited distribution, and habitats that are often located on steep and inaccessible cliffs that are difficult to observe. The species is classified as “Vulnerable (VU)” in “The Red List of Vascular Plants of Taiwan, 2017.”

== Description and phenology ==
=== Description ===
A succulent herb with a fibrous root system. The entire plant is smooth in texture, with the lower part of the plant creeping and the upper part leaning or nearly erect, reaching a height of approximately 6 to 12 cm (2.4 to 4.7 in). The leaves are spatulate or slightly rhomboid, with entire leaf margins, with a slightly protruding or short-pointed apex. The leaves are arranged alternately and are approximately 10 to 25 mm (0.39 to 0.98 in) in length and 4 to 6 mm (0.16 to 0.24 in) in width. The inflorescence is a scorpioid cyme composed of basic units of cymes. The flowers are sessile and arranged closely together, with a distance of only approximately 5 mm (0.20 in) between each flower. The calyx is green with five sepals usually in varying sizes that are approximately 2.8 to 4 mm (0.11 to 0.16 in) in length and 0.9 mm (0.035 in) in width, spathulate, free at the base and spurred; they remain in a horizontal position when the fruit is ripe. The corolla is bright yellow with five elliptic-lanceolate-shaped petals. The stamens are arranged in two whorls of ten, with the outer whorl located between the petals and the filaments fused at the base with the adjacent petal bases. The inner whorl is opposite to the petals, with the filaments fused to the central base of the petals. The pistil is composed of five carpels that are generally free and partially fused at the base. Each flower typically produces five follicles that are arranged in a star-shaped pattern at the apex of the stem.

=== Phenology ===
The species is a perennial herb that blooms from April to May. The main stem usually withers after flowering and fruiting, and new shoots emerge from the base of the plant or from the nodes of the creeping stems. The new shoots may appear dormant during the autumn and winter seasons and may be mistaken for sterile branches. The growth of these dormant shoots resumes in the following year and produces flowers on more vigorous branches

== Distribution ==
Endemic to Taiwan, this is one of the narrowly distributed plants of the Sedum genus that are distributed in low-altitude areas of the island, along with S. uniflorum Hook. & Arn., Sedum drymarioides Hance, S. tarokoense H. W. Lin & J. C. Wang. Its distribution ranges from Datun Mountain in the north to Pingxi, Shiding Mountains, to Yilan. The habitats are often located on steep cliffs with moist and semi-shaded rocks near ridgelines. The population size consists of only a few dozen. The “Red List of Vascular Plants of Taiwan, 2017,” assessed its threat level as “Vulnerable (VU)” due to its small population and the possibility of less than 1000 mature individuals.

== Taxonomy ==
The species was first cited by Yoshimatsu Yamamoto in 1926 based on earlier specimens collected by Bunzo Hayata et al. from 1899 to 1916 in northern Taiwan. It was published as a new species in the “Supplementa Iconum Plantarum Formosanarum” under the scientific name Sedum sekiteiense Yamamoto. Since its publication, this classification has rarely been challenged. In 1982, Tsai-I Yang attempted to merge the species with Sedum actinocarpum Yamam. Without providing the rationale for the merger, therefore, the merger was not widely accepted[1]. In 1987, Wei-Hsin Tang revised the classification of the Sedum genus in Taiwan and re-established Sedum sekiteiense as a separate species. In 2000, Hong-Wen Lin re-examined the classification of the genus and emphasized the significant differences between Sedum sekiteiense and Sedum actinocarpum in terms of habitat, plant, and sepal morphology, and that the two species should not be merged.

== Conservation ==
Sedum sekiteiense is currently a conservation target of the “National Botanical Gardens” project of the Forestry Research Institute, Council of Agriculture, Executive Yuan. The species is considered to have the potential of being developed into a native plant for pot cultivation due to its succulent characteristics, to be used in the promotion of local conservation and environmental education.
