= Sedum goldmanii =

Scientific classification
- Kingdom: Plantae
- Clade: Tracheophytes
- Clade: Angiosperms
- Clade: Eudicots
- Order: Saxifragales
- Family: Crassulaceae
- Genus: Sedum
- Species: S. goldmanii

Binomial name
- Sedum goldmanii (Rose) Moran

Species of flowering plant

Sedum goldmanii is a plant in the family Crassulaceae. It is native to Mexico.
