= Sedum alamosanum =

Scientific classification
- Kingdom: Plantae
- Clade: Tracheophytes
- Clade: Angiosperms
- Clade: Eudicots
- Order: Saxifragales
- Family: Crassulaceae
- Genus: Sedum
- Species: S. alamosanum

Binomial name
- Sedum alamosanum S. Watson

Species of plant

Sedum alamosanum, known by the common name Alamos stonecrop, is a rare succulent plant native to the mountains of northwestern Mexico. It is characterized by white flowers and bluish-green leaves. It is found in Baja California Sur, Chihuahua, Durango, Sinaloa and Sonora.

== Description ==
=== Morphology ===
The rosettes are 1 to 1.5 cm high, 7 to 10 mm thick, with around 50 to 100 papillose and bluish leaves.

The floral stems are 3 to 7 cm tall, and around 1 to 1.5 mm thick, textured smoothly, light green. The stems cluster around the base in flower. The bracts are spreading or somewhat ascending, oblong, narrowly rounded at the apex, sub-truncate at the base and contracted to a narrow point of attachment. The dimensions of the bracts are 4 to 6 mm long, 1 to 1.5 mm wide, and .75 to 1 mm thick. By the time of flowering, many of the bracts may have already withered or fallen off.

The inflorescence has roughly 2 to 3 flowers, with pedicels 1 to 2 mm long, and around 1 mm thick, and papillose. The calyx is also papillose, with nearly-equal segments, that are ascending in bud and spreading in flower. The corolla is 8 to 9 mm wide, greenish-white and somewhat marked with pink. The petals are reflexed, triangular-lanceolate, acute, and 3.5 to 4 mm long, 1.25 to 1.5 mm wide. The filaments are whitish, ascending and the anthers are red, ovoid. Plants have a chromosome number of n=18.

Flowering is from September to October.

== Taxonomy ==
The species was described by Sereno Watson. Reid Moran discovered the plants growing in the Sierra de la Giganta in Baja California Sur while on a botanical expedition with Anetta M. Carter.

== Distribution and habitat ==
This plant is found in the montane regions of northwestern Mexico. In Baja California Sur, it is found in the Sierra de Guadalupe and the Sierra de la Giganta, at altitudes around 3,000 to 5,000 ft. It usually grows in shaded habitats at the bases of rocky cliffs and steep slopes. It is also found in the mountains of Chihuahua, Sonora, and possibly in the Sierra Madre Occidental of Sinaloa and Durango.
