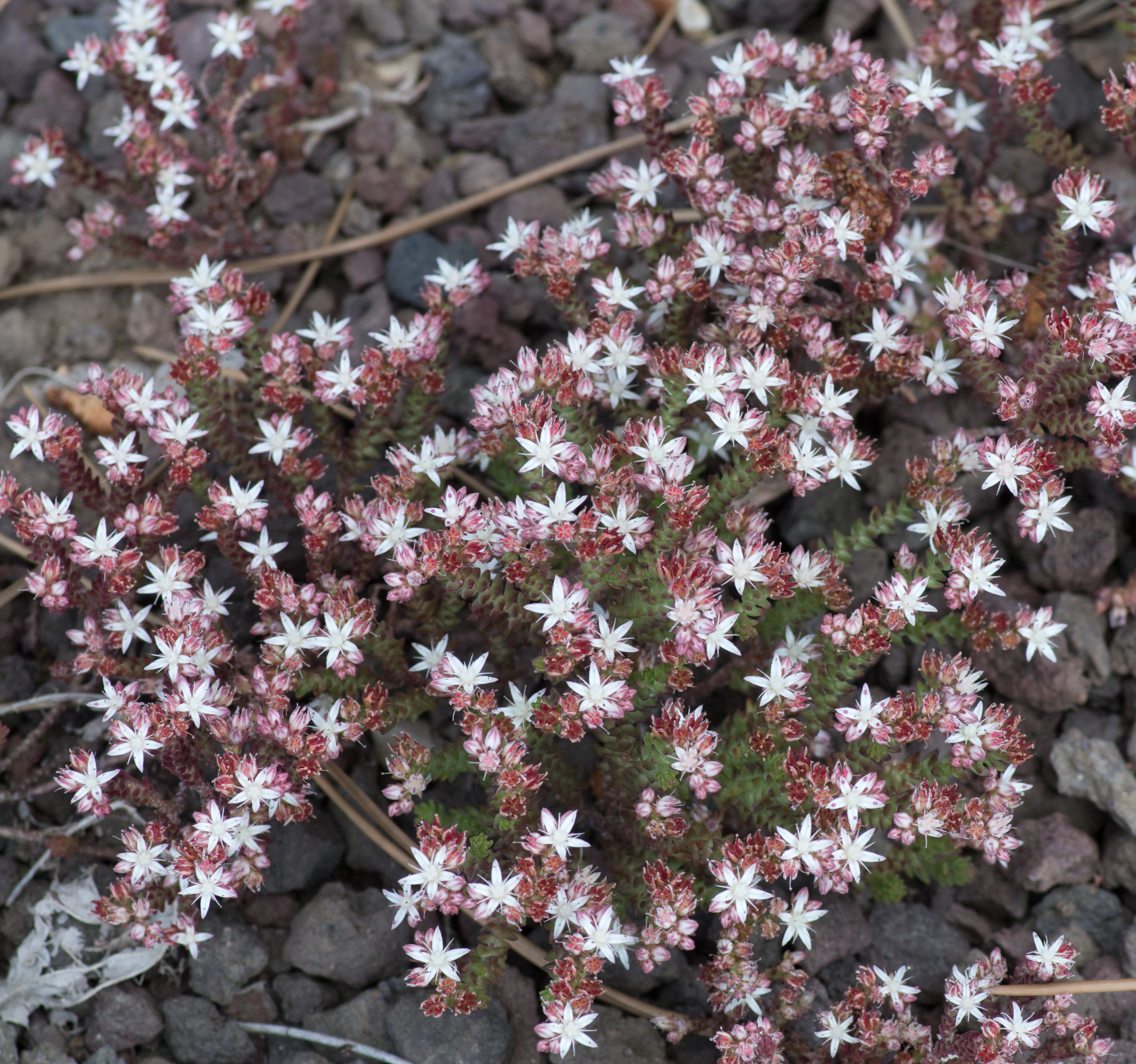

Scientific classification
- Kingdom: Plantae
- Clade: Embryophytes
- Clade: Tracheophytes
- Clade: Angiosperms
- Clade: Eudicots
- Order: Saxifragales
- Family: Crassulaceae
- Genus: Sedum
- Species: S. moranense

Binomial name
- Sedum moranense Kunth, 1823

= Sedum moranense =

Species of flowering plant

Sedum moranense, or red stonecrop, is a species of flowering plant in the family Crassulaceae.

== Description ==
Adult plant has many small green succulent leaves densely clustered around stems.

== Habitat and distribution ==
Native to Mexico, it has also been introduced to Colombia. It grows primarily in the desert or dry shrubland biome.

== Taxonomy ==
There are two accepted subspecies:

- Sedum moranense subsp. grandiflorum R.T.Clausen
- Sedum moranense subsp. moranense
