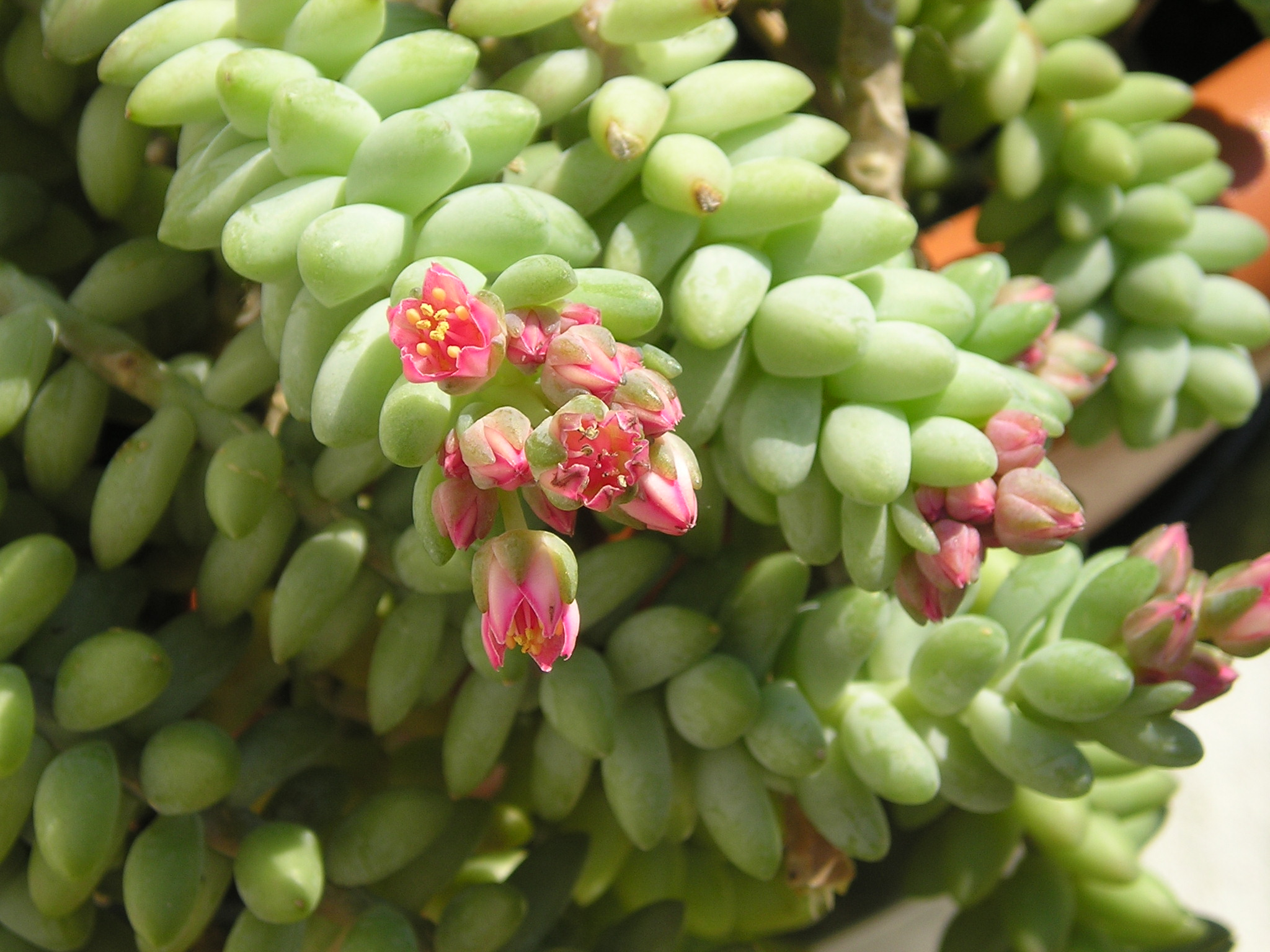

Scientific classification
- Kingdom: Plantae
- Clade: Tracheophytes
- Clade: Angiosperms
- Clade: Eudicots
- Order: Saxifragales
- Family: Crassulaceae
- Genus: Sedum
- Species: S. morganianum

Binomial name
- Sedum morganianum E. Walther

= Sedum morganianum =

Donkey tail

Species of succulent

Sedum morganianum, the donkey tail or burro's tail, is a species of flowering plant in the family Crassulaceae, native to southern Mexico. It is a succulent perennial producing trailing stems up to 60 cm (24 in) long, with fleshy blue-green leaves and terminal pink to red flowers in summer. S. morganianum has been found wild in two ravines at Tenampa county, in central Veracruz, in eastern Mexico and on vertical cliffs of igneous rock in the Tropical Deciduous Forest zone. Due to its restricted geographic distribution, it should be regarded as a micro-endemic species.

== Cultivation ==
With a minimum temperature of 5–7 °C (41–45 °F), in temperate regions S. morganianum is often cultivated as a houseplant in a suspended container, with the trailing stems hanging down, vertically. Alternatively, when the trailing stems are allowed to make prolonged, direct contact with the ground, or soil or other substrate (such as in an adjacent container), the nodes will be triggered to root and attach, as is the case with numerous genera among the Crassulaceae.

This plant has gained the Royal Horticultural Society's Award of Garden Merit.

Sedum morganianum grows well outside in appropriate climates, provided frost is not a threat, in very good light but protected from the brightest portions of the day. Indoors, the plant is best grown in a window full of sunlight for strongest growth and to enhance leaf coloration. It requires regular, moderate watering all year, except in winter, when it should be infrequently watered. Excess irrigation and poor drainage can rot the plant in a short amount of time. If grown outside, this plant should also be sheltered from extreme heat and excess rainfall; the delicate and fragile leaves will fall from the plant extremely easily, often with the slightest touch, especially during rainstorms. However, even at high latitudes, removed or dropped leaves will readily propagate and produce roots, often rooting directly where they fall. These leaf propagations eventually form into new plants, especially if placed in a southern exposure (Northern Hemisphere) or northern exposure (Southern Hemisphere).

Plants are usually propagated by stem or leaf cuttings. The leaf attachment is quite loose, and leaves will often immediately break off of the stem when disturbed. The leaves will stay alive for many days and roots will emerge after a few days, especially with local humidity. Individual leaves will produce inches-long plants.

This plant exhibits a clearly visible wax layer (farina) on its leaves and stems, an indication of its preference for (bright) shade and sheltering from hot sun.

== Gallery ==
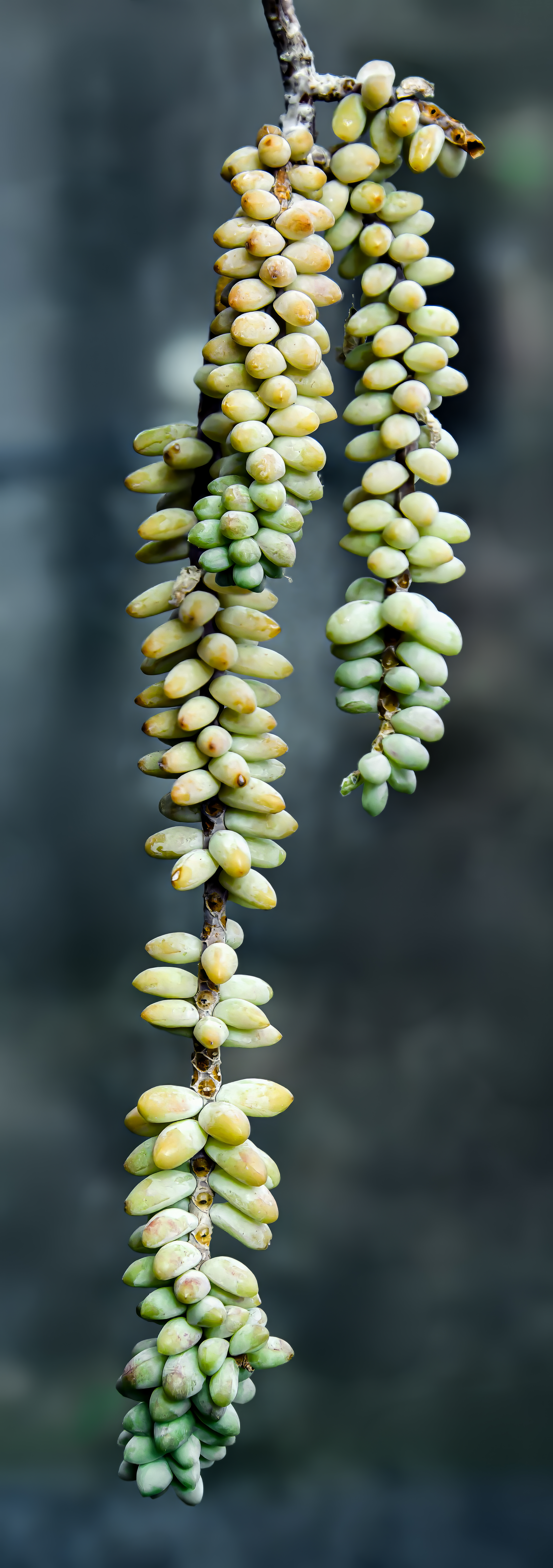

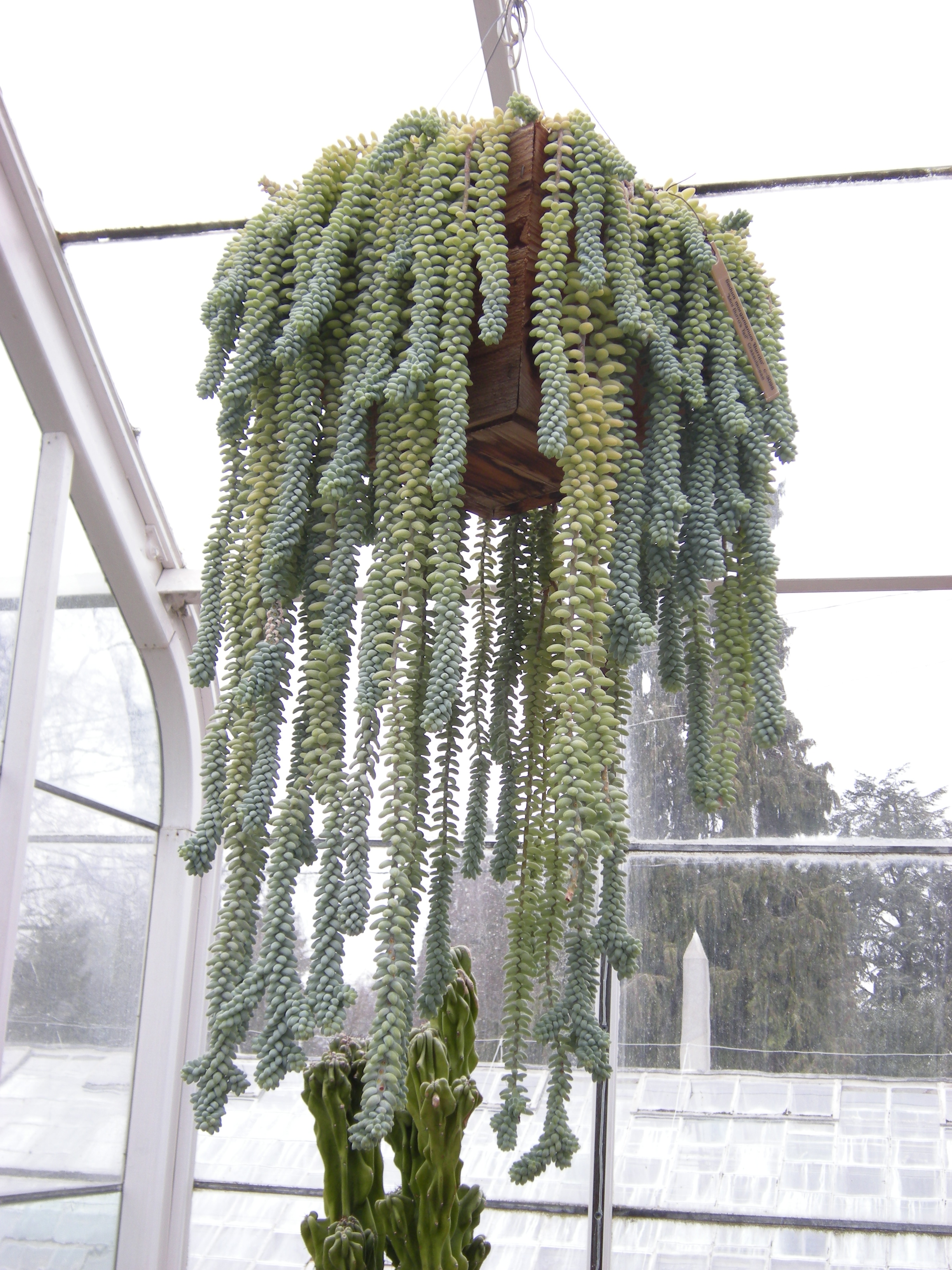

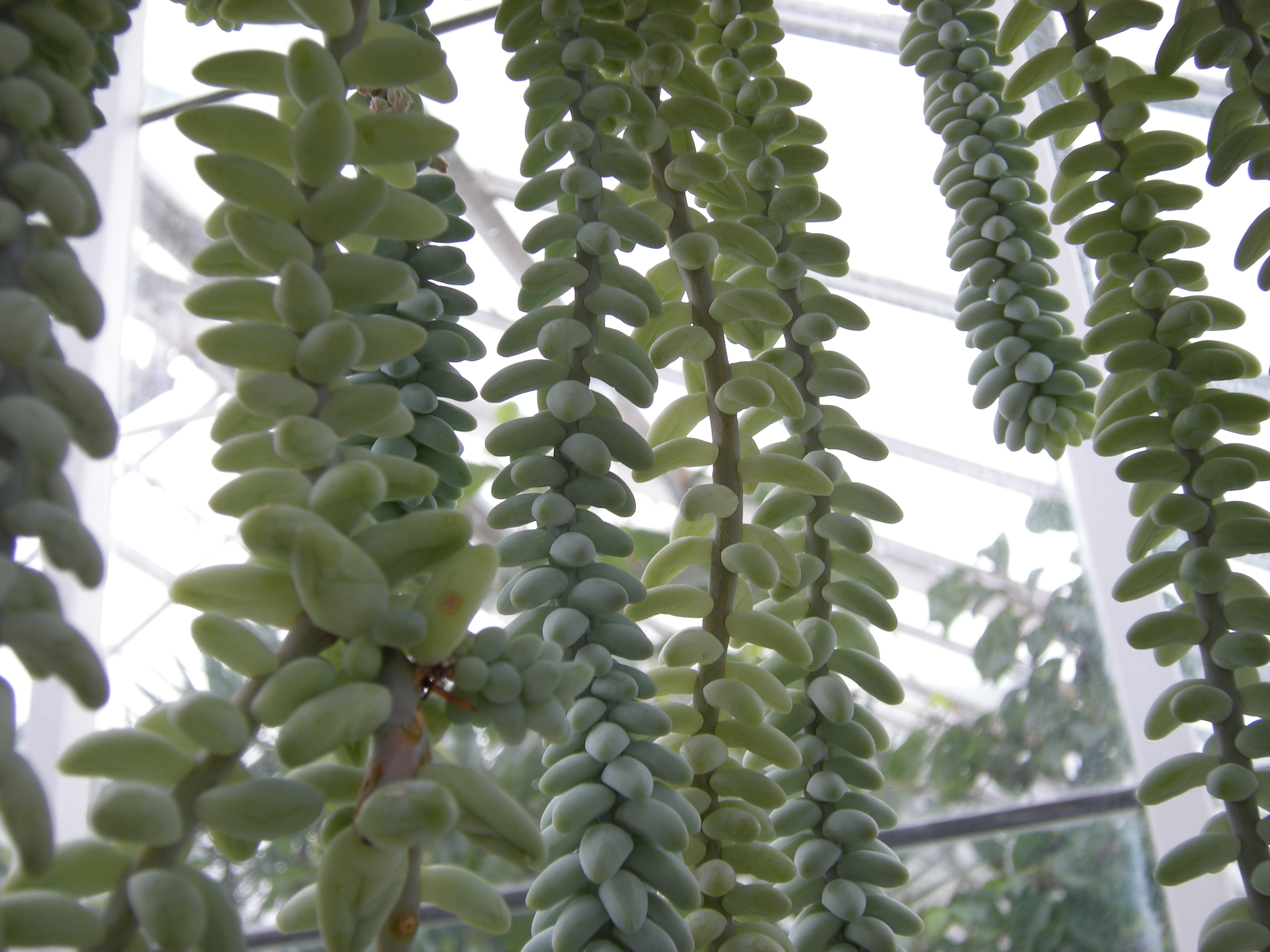

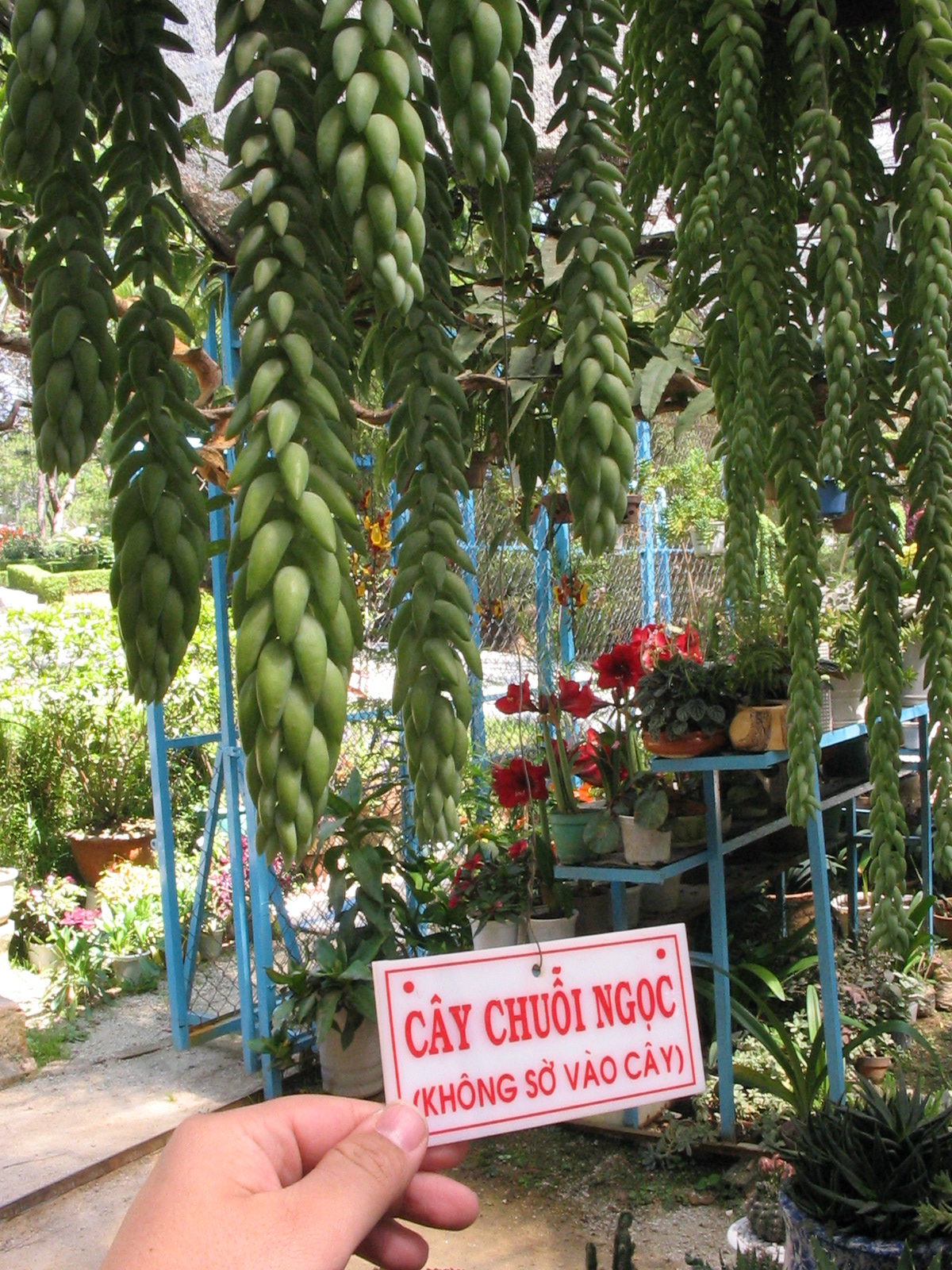

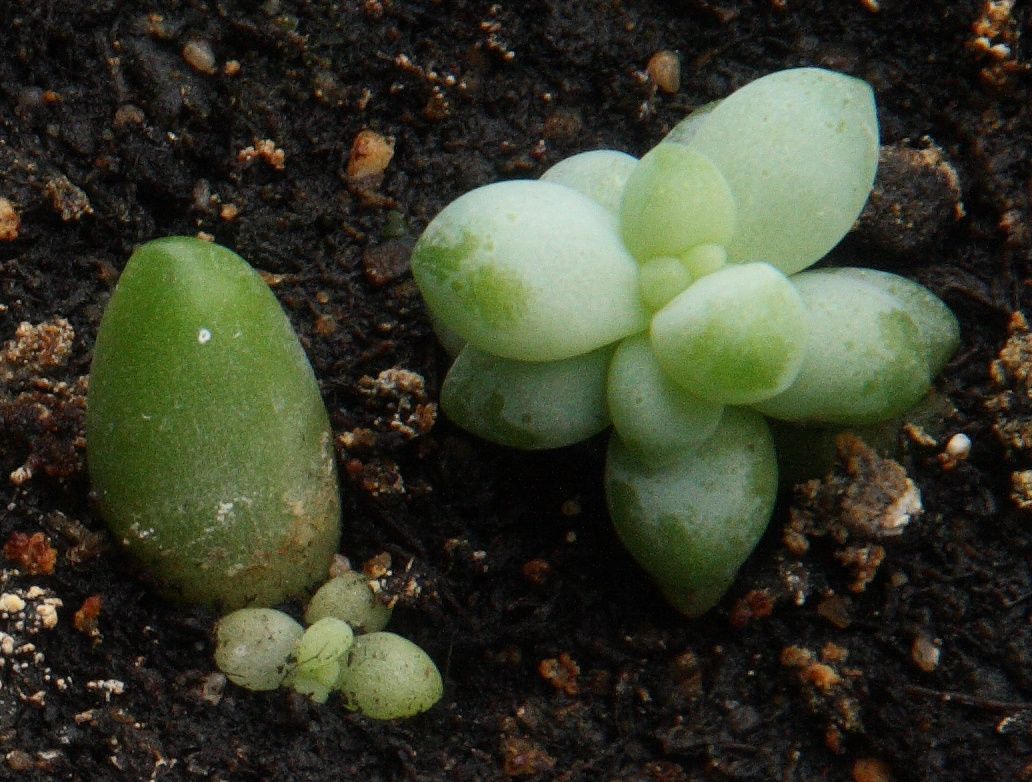
Leaf cutting with fresh sprout (left), stem cutting with shoot (right)

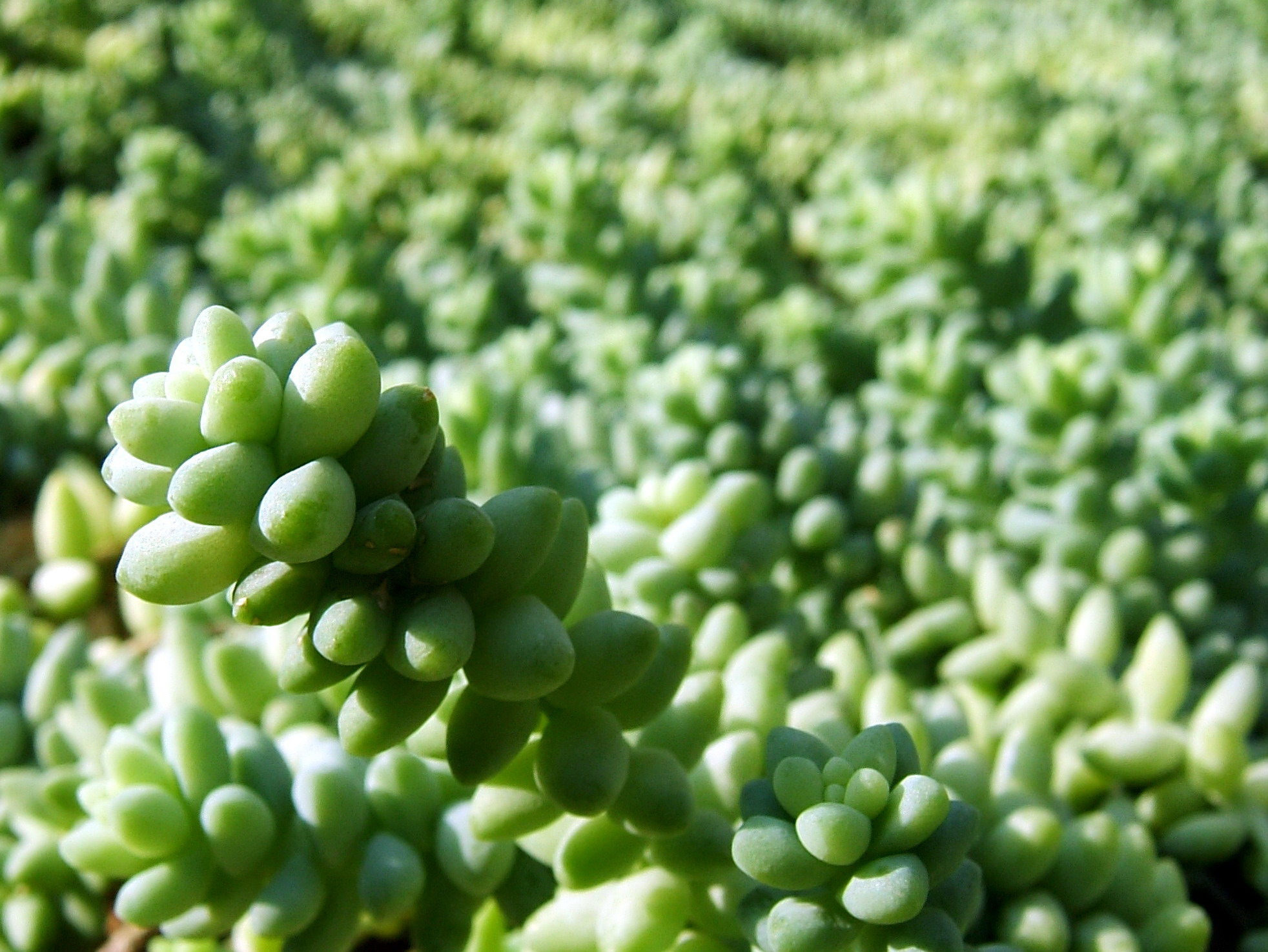
'Burrito' cultivar
