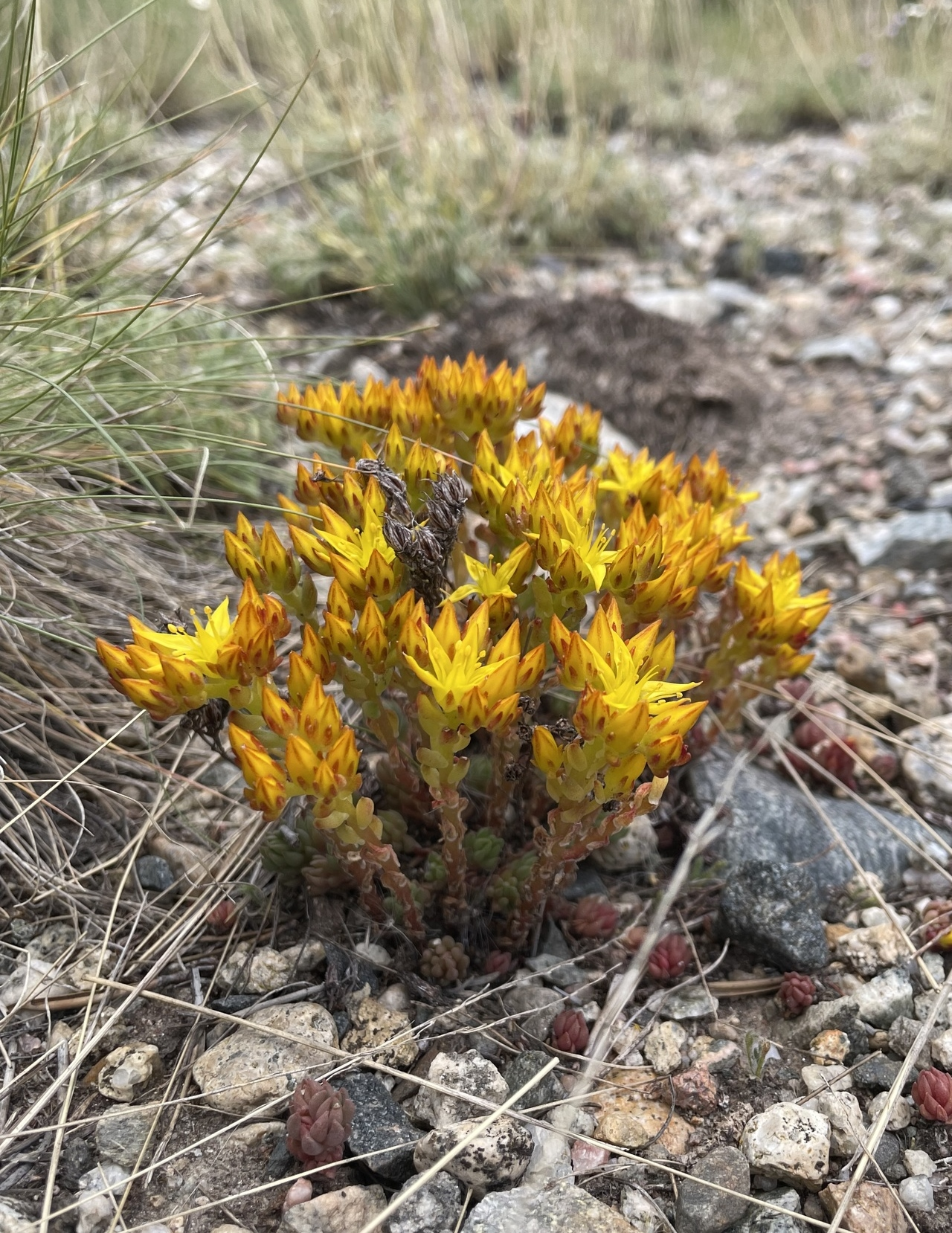
- Subspecies lanceolatum, White River National Forest, Colorado

Conservation status
- Secure (NatureServe)

Scientific classification
- Kingdom: Plantae
- Clade: Tracheophytes
- Clade: Angiosperms
- Clade: Eudicots
- Order: Saxifragales
- Family: Crassulaceae
- Genus: Sedum
- Species: S. lanceolatum

Binomial name
- Sedum lanceolatum Torr.

Subspecies
- S. lanceolatum subsp. lanceolatum; S. lanceolatum subsp. nesioticum
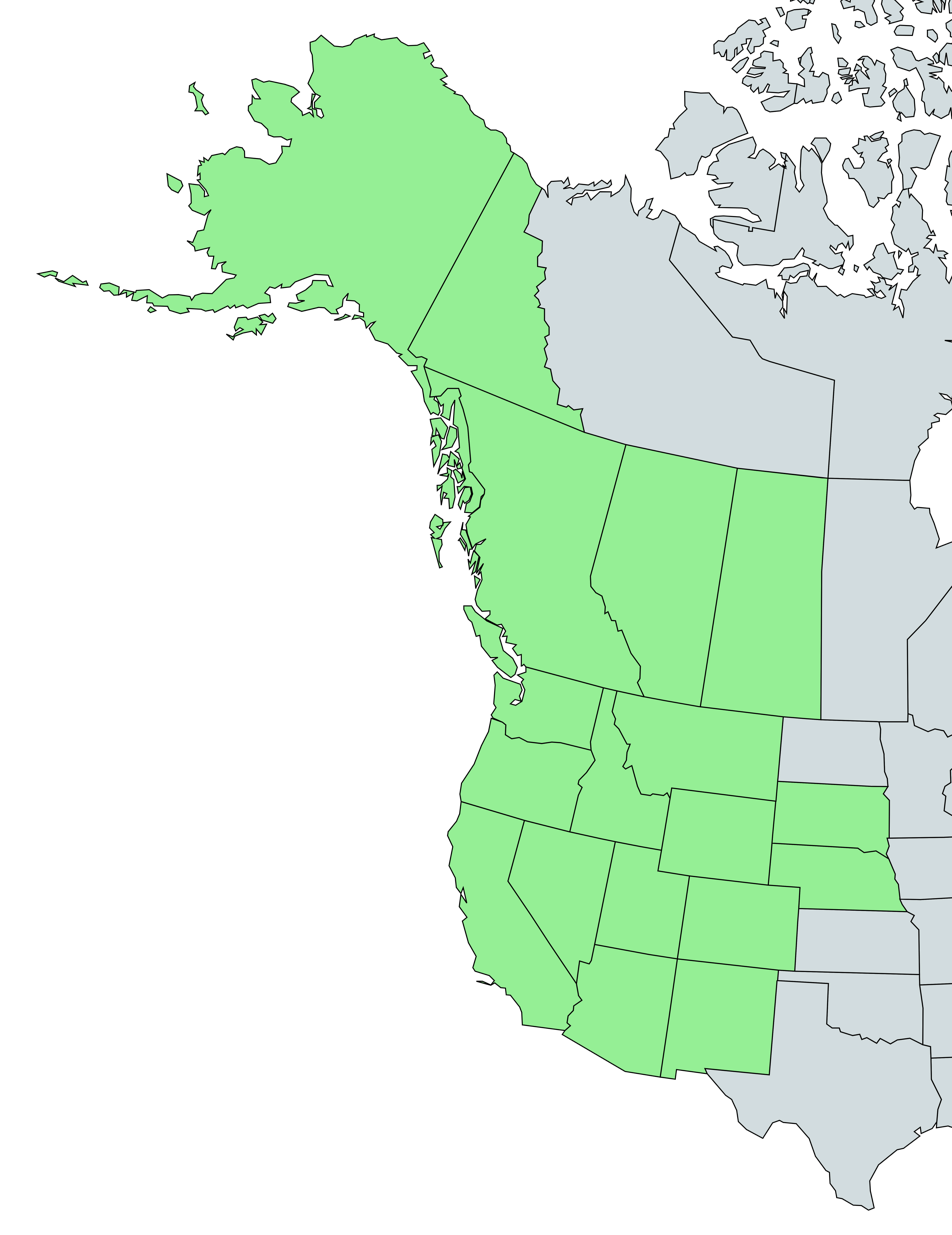
- The range of Sedum lanceolatum in western North America

Synonyms
- Amerosedum lanceolatum; Sedum lanceolatum subsp. typicum

= Sedum lanceolatum =

Species of succulent flowering stonecrop

Sedum lanceolatum is a species of flowering plant in the stonecrop family known by the common names lanceleaf stonecrop and spearleaf stonecrop.

It is native to western North America and occurs in western Canada and the United States. It is distributed from Alaska to Arizona and New Mexico and as far east as South Dakota and Nebraska. It grows in exposed, rocky mountainous habitats at moderate and high elevations, up to 4,048 meters (13,281 ft) in the Rocky Mountains. The plant persisted and evolved on sky islands and nunataks in these ranges during glaciation events during the Pleistocene epoch.

== Description ==
Sedum lanceolatum is a very short succulent plant. Each plant will develop numerous branching sterile stems with tight clusters of leaves. The stems are both decumbent and ascending, growing along the surface of the ground or curving to grow upwards. Each stem will have a rosette of leaves at its end. The branchlets are easily broken apart. Each stem is biennial, but replaced by offsets.

The leaves are not easily detached from the stems and are attached to the stems in a spiral. The shape of the leaves is subterete, nearly circular in cross section, with an outline that can be lanceolate, elliptic-lanceolate, or elliptic-ovate. They are also quite short, just 4.2 to 13 millimeters long, and 1.5–3.5 mm in width. The leaves vary in color with those exposed to strong, full sun conditions they are maroon while in less exposed situations they are dark gray-green and dull.

The flowering stems are erect, growing straight upwards, to between 3 and 18 centimeters (1.2 and 7.1 in) in height. Leaves are attached alternately to flowering stems and often fall off by the time the flowers begin to bloom. The flowering head is a flat-topped cluster of yellow flowers. The number of flowers on each stem may be as few as three or as many as twenty-five. They are either loosely or densely packed on a branched cyme, a type of determinate inflorescence.

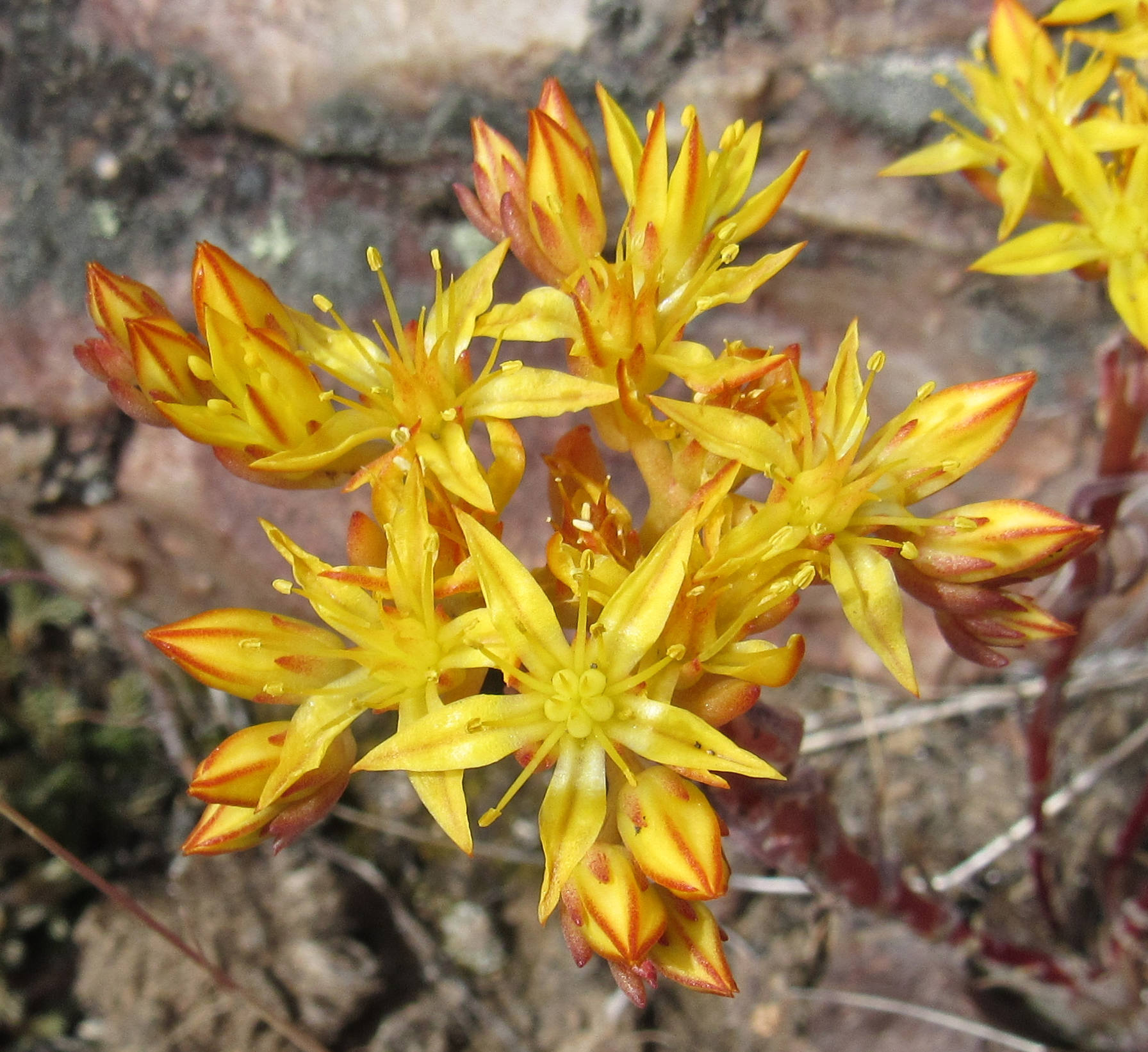
Flowers and buds, photographed in Custer County, Idaho

The flowers have canary to golden yellow petals sometimes tinged with red, especially on the central rib. Each flower will usually have five petals and five sepals, but occasionally may have just four. The petals are longer than the sepals, normally measuring 6 to 9.2 millimeters long, but occasionally just 5.5 mm. They are lanceolate to ovate in shape. The ten stamens are tipped with yellow anthers. Each flower will normally produce five carpels but can occasionally have just four. The central flower will be noticeably larger than the other flowers on a stem.

The plant reproduces sexually by its tiny, lightweight seeds, or vegetatively when sections of its stem break off and root. The seeds are about 1 mm in size and brown to dark brown in color.

The related narrow-petaled stonecrop (Sedum stenopetalum) can be distinguished by a ridge on the underside of its leaves.

== Taxonomy ==
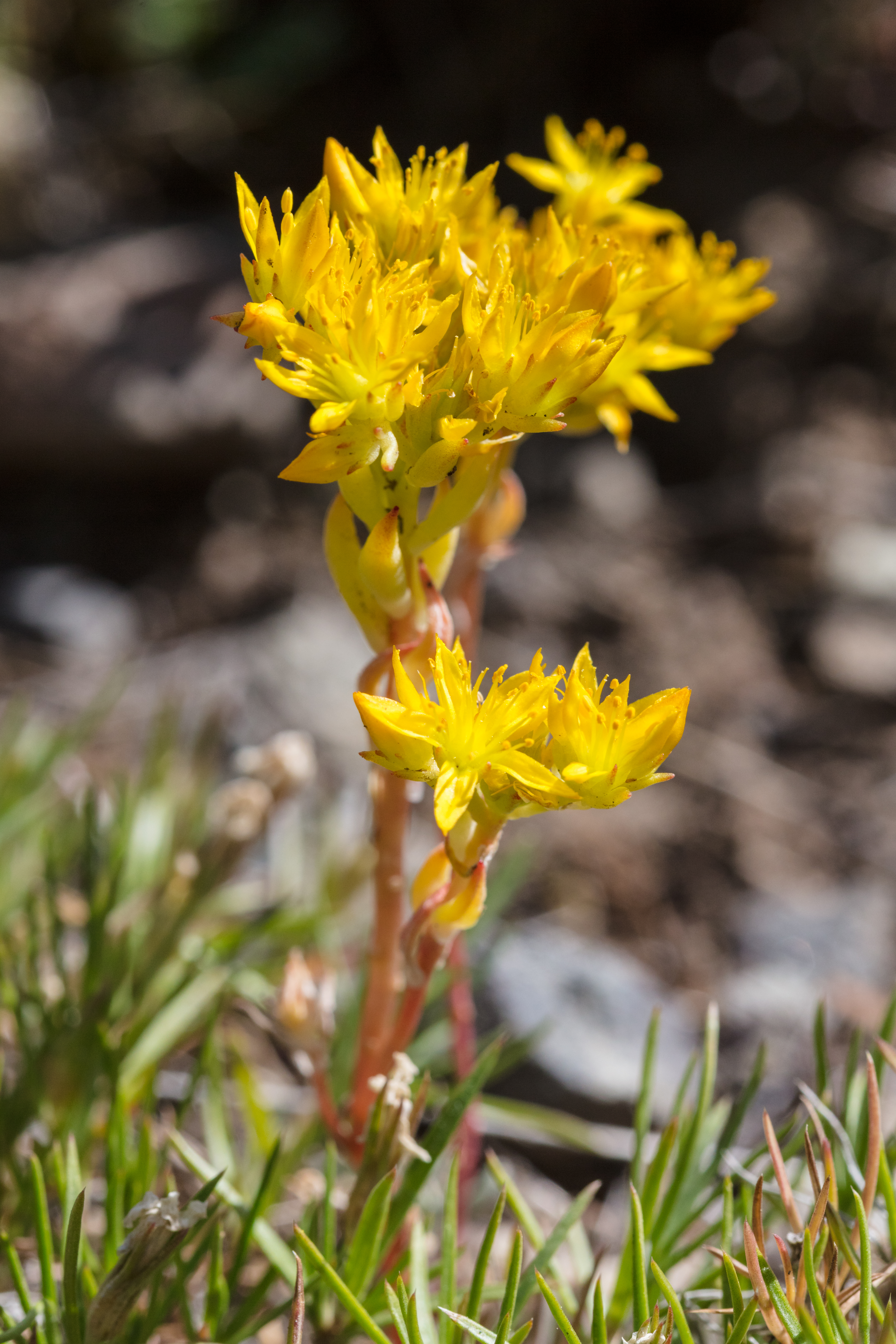
In Yellowstone National Park

Sedum lanceolatum is classified in the Sedum genus in the family Crassulaceae. The scientific description and name of the species was published in 1827 by John Torrey.

There are significant genetic differences between populations of lanceleaf stonecrop between the Southern Rocky Mountains and the Central Rocky Mountains across the Wyoming Gap and what is now the Wyoming Basin shrub steppe because the lower altitudes serve as a barrier to this and other species with a preference for high elevations. Additionally, during the most recent glacial period, genetic evidence supports that the species was isolated in sky islands and nunataks that protruded above the glaciers.

=== Subspecies ===
The species has two accepted subspecies, though the Flora of North America following the classification by Charles Leo Hitchcock lists them as varieties.

==== Sedum lanceolatum subsp. lanceolatum ====
The autonymic subspecies is much more widespread, growing through much of the western United States and Canada. It differs from subspecies nesioticum in having shorter leaves on average, ranging from 4.2 to 9 mm where the sister subspecies is 8 to 13 mm. Its flowering stems are 5 to 15 cm (2.0 to 5.9 in) tall and its flowers have sepals that measure 2–4 mm with petals 6–9 mm. It can grow from sea level to elevations of 4,100 meters (13,500 ft).

==== Sedum lanceolatum subsp. nesioticum ====
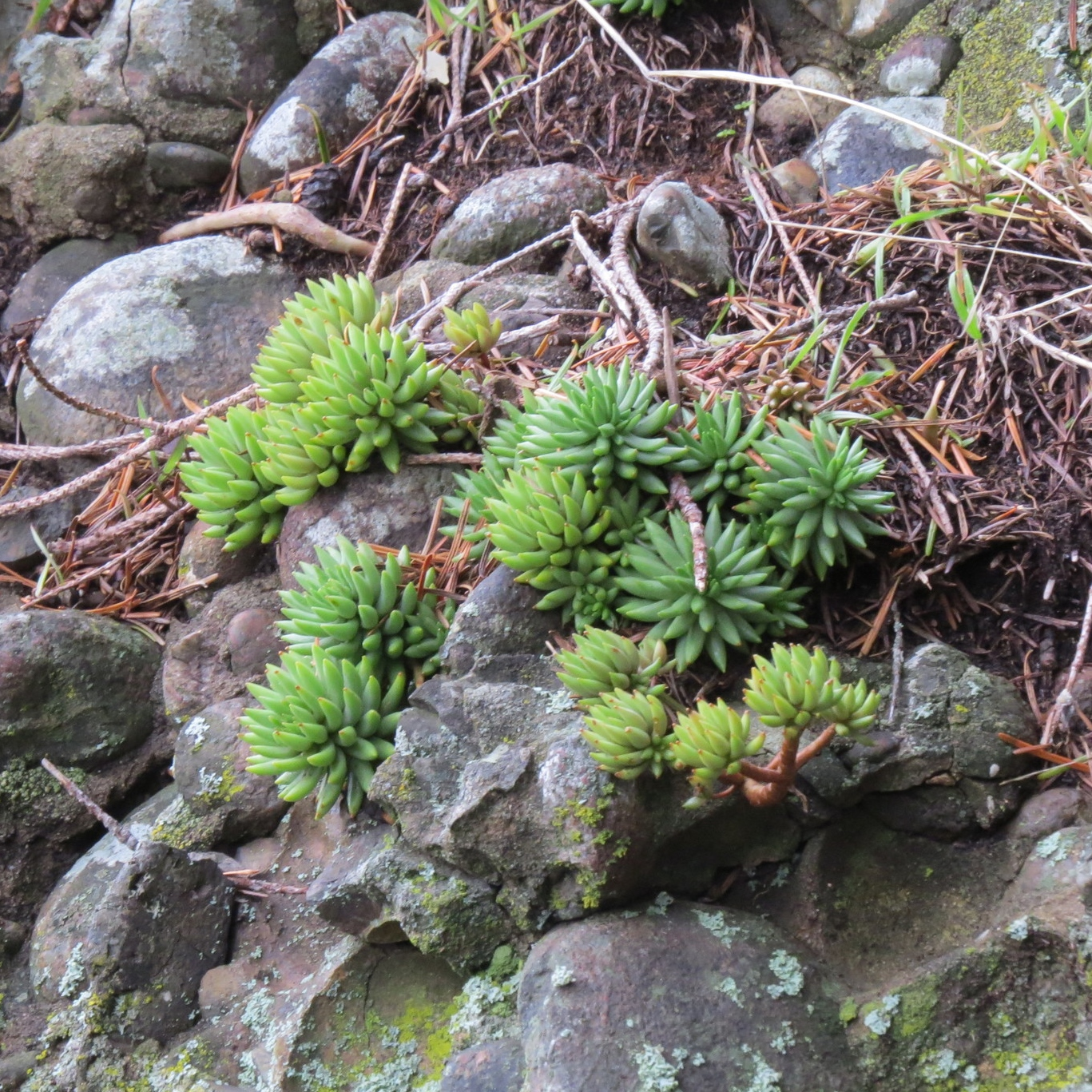
Subspecies nesioticum on Vancouver Island, British Columbia

This subspecies was scientifically described as a species and named Sedum nesioticum in 1941 by George Neville Jones. It was reclassified as a subspecies by Robert Theodore Clausen in 1948. It grows near the ocean in British Columbia, Washington, and Oregon. It is distinguished from the more widespread subspecies by having leaves that are wider, 3-3.5 mm, and at 8–13 mm longer on average with some overlap. Its flowering stems reach 10 to 30 cm (3.9 to 11.8 in) tall, also somewhat larger as are the sepals and petals, 4–5 mm and 9–9.2 mm in length respectively. It flowers two weeks later on average, likely due to the cooling effect of growing near the Pacific Ocean. Its populations are all found within 20 meters (66 ft) of sea level.

=== Synonyms ===
Sedum lanceolatum has 13 synonyms of the species or one of its subspecies.

Table of Synonyms
Name	Year	Rank	Synonym of:	Notes
Amerosedum lanceolatum (Torr.) Á.Löve & D.Löve	1985	species	S. lanceolatum	≡ hom.
Amerosedum nesioticum (G.N.Jones) Á.Löve & D.Löve	1985	species	subsp. nesioticum	≡ hom.
Amerosedum subalpinum (Blank.) Á.Löve & D.Löve	1985	species	subsp. lanceolatum	= het.
Sedum lanceolatum var. nesioticum (G.N.Jones) C.L.Hitchc.	1964	variety	subsp. nesioticum	≡ hom.
Sedum lanceolatum subsp. subalpinum (Blank.) R.T.Clausen	1975	subspecies	subsp. lanceolatum	= het.
Sedum lanceolatum var. subalpinum (Fröd.) H.Ohba	2007	variety	subsp. lanceolatum	= het. nom. illeg.
Sedum lanceolatum subsp. typicum R.T.Clausen	1948	subspecies	S. lanceolatum	≡ hom. not validly publ.
Sedum nesioticum G.N.Jones	1941	species	subsp. nesioticum	≡ hom.
Sedum shastense Britton	1903	species	subsp. lanceolatum	= het.
Sedum stenopetalum f. rubrolineatum Cockerell	1891	form	subsp. lanceolatum	= het.
Sedum stenopetalum subsp. nesioticum (G.N.Jones) R.T.Clausen	1946	subspecies	subsp. nesioticum	≡ hom.
Sedum stenopetalum var. subalpinum Fröd.	1936	variety	subsp. lanceolatum	= het.
Sedum subalpinum Blank.	1905	species	subsp. lanceolatum	= het.
Notes: ≡ homotypic synonym; = heterotypic synonym

=== Names ===
The species name, lanceolatum, means lanceolate. In English it is known by the common name lanceleaf stonecrop and the variant lance-leaf stonecrop. It is additionally known as spearleaf stonecrop and common stonecrop. It is at times also called yellow stonecrop, but it shares this name with Sedum acre, Sedum nuttallianum, and Sedum stenopetalum.

== Range and habitat ==
Lanceleaf stonecrop has a native range across much of western North America from Alaska to New Mexico. In Canada it is reported from the Yukon Territory, British Columbia, Alberta, and Saskatchewan. In the Pacific Northwest, it grows in much of Washington, Oregon, and Idaho. Eastward across the Rocky Mountains it is only reported from three counties in Montana. It grows in five counties in the Black Hills of southwest South Dakota while only found Sioux County at the western edge of Nebraska. It grows in all but two counties of Wyoming and the western two-thirds of Colorado. It only grows in the northwestern part of New Mexico. In the Southwestern United States it grows throughout all of Utah, the northeastern part of Arizona, many parts of Nevada, and in the high Sierra Nevada ranges, the Klamath Ranges, and high Cascade Mountains in California. The exact extent of its range is uncertain, but is estimated at between 20,000 and 2,500,000 square kilometers (8,000 and 965,000 sq mi).

It grows on stony outcrops, dry rocky slopes, and areas of lithosol, places with very thin and poorly developed soils. It is associated with a wide range of stones including limestone, sandstone, marble, andesite, basalt, granodiorite, and granite. However, the botanist Charles Uhl reports that it is not often found or may be absent from basaltic rocks and lava outcroppings. It is strongly associated with the alpine tundra and subalpine zone along the North American Cordillera, but can be found in many other habitats including on gravelly sites on the Great Plains adjacent to the mountains. It is also found in sunny, open stony places in sagebrush steppes, piñon–juniper woodlands, mountain brush, ponderosa pine forests, interior Douglass-fir forests, aspen, spruce–fir forests, lodgepole pine communities.

=== Conservation ===
Sedum lanceolatum was evaluated by NatureServe in 2015 and rated as secure (G5). It was also rated as secure (S5) in the Yukon, British Columbia, Washington, and Wyoming. In Alberta and Montana, it is apparently secure (S4) but is vulnerable (S3) in Saskatchewan. It was only rated as critically imperiled (S1) in Alaska.

== Ecology ==
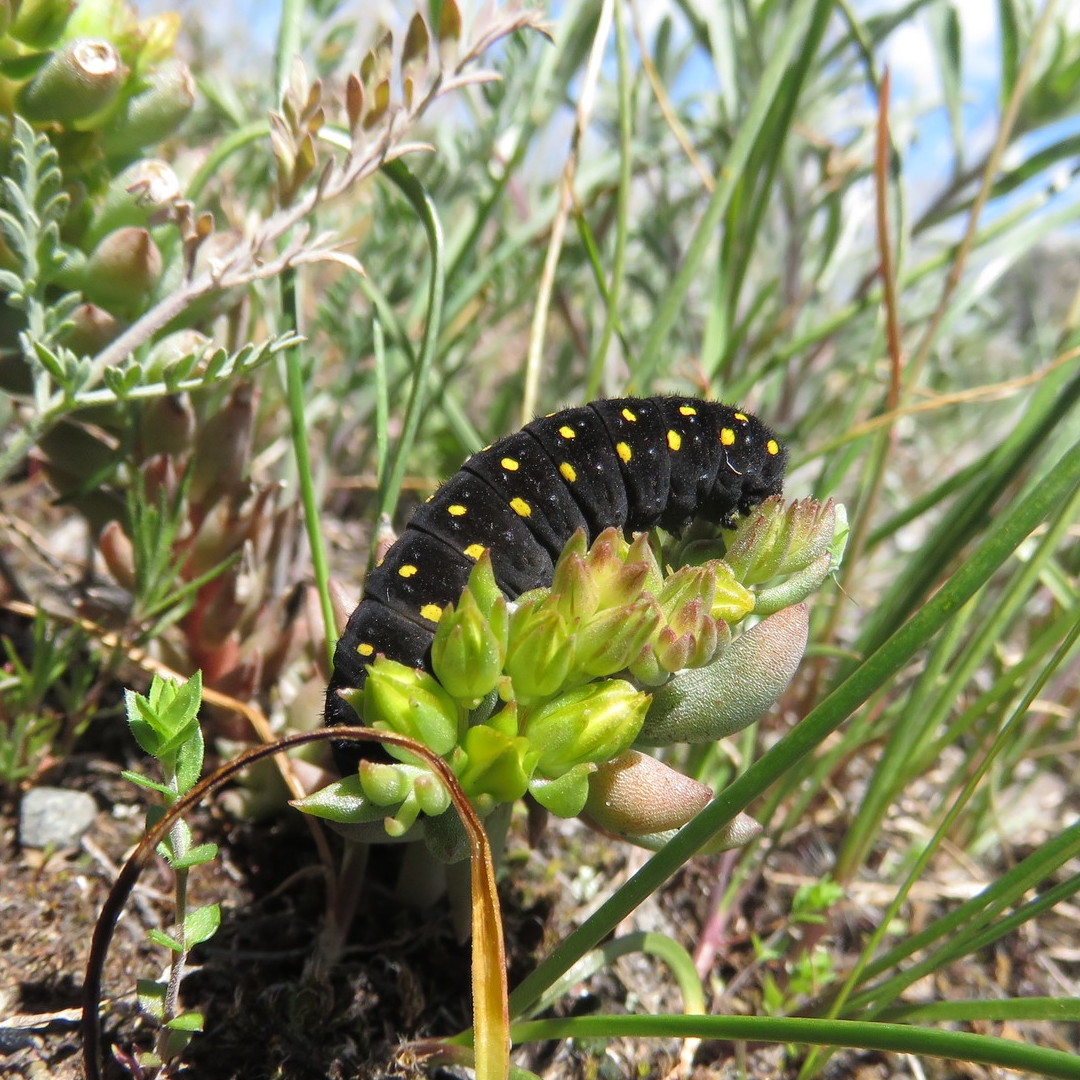
Rocky Mountain apollo caterpillar feeding on lanceleaf stonecrop

Sedum lanceolatum is almost the sole host plant of the Rocky Mountain apollo butterfly (Parnassius smintheus) in large parts of its range. The plant produces a deterrent cyanoglycoside, sarmentosin, so that herbivores do not feed on it. This butterfly's larvae sequester sarmentosin from the plant for their own defense. However, it has been found that if the plant becomes physically damaged by mechanical means, the larvae feeding on it have reduced growth rates, possibly due to an induced defense by the plant itself. Consequently, the larvae often hurry to feed, then switch to another plant within the time window offering the highest nutritional quality. Larvae will typically feed and leave a plant in less than half an hour. From November to February, the leaves of their foodplant are fatally toxic to the larvae, but for the rest of the year, the larvae feed and develop normally. If the snow melts before March, the eggs hatch while the larval foodplant is still toxic, and the larvae perish.

== Uses ==
Lanceleaf stonecrop is a drought tolerant species that is planted in rock gardens. However, it is a rare species in the plant trade and usually only available from specialist sources in Europe. It can be slow to spread and difficult to grow in areas of high rainfall.
