= Speed Martin =

American baseball player (1893–1983)

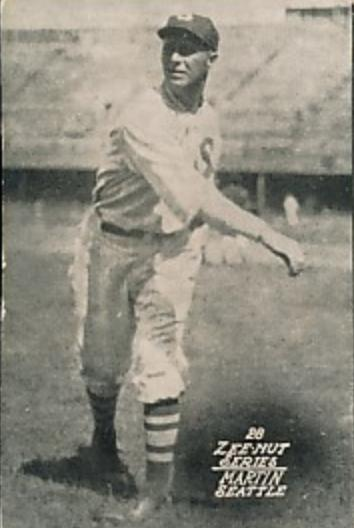
- Pitcher
- Born: September 15, 1893; Wawawai, Washington, U.S.
- Died: June 14, 1983 (aged 89); Lemon Grove, California, U.S.
- Batted: Right Threw: Right

MLB debut
- July 5, 1917, for the St. Louis Browns

Last MLB appearance
- April 17, 1922, for the Chicago Cubs

MLB statistics
- Win–loss record: 29–42
- Earned run average: 3.78
- Strikeouts: 207
- Stats at Baseball Reference

Teams
- St. Louis Browns (1917); Chicago Cubs (1918–1922)

Elwood Good "Speed" Martin (September 15, 1893 – June 14, 1983) was an American Major League Baseball player from 1917 to 1922. He was a pitcher for the St. Louis Browns and Chicago Cubs.

Martin pitched for the Cubs in 1918, but did not appear in the 1918 World Series. He won a career-best 11 games for them in 1921.
