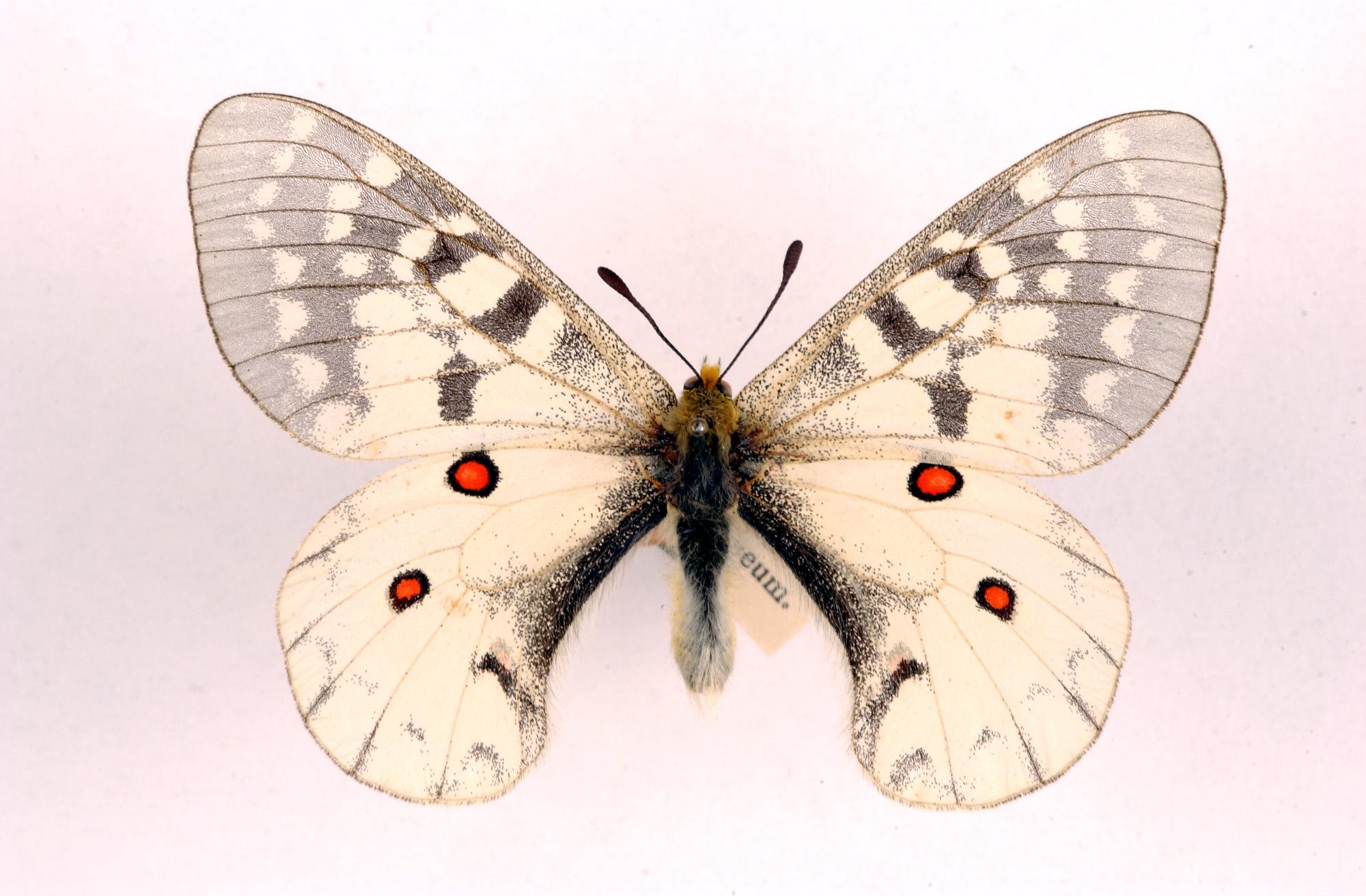
- Parnassius clodius incredibilis, male from St. Elie
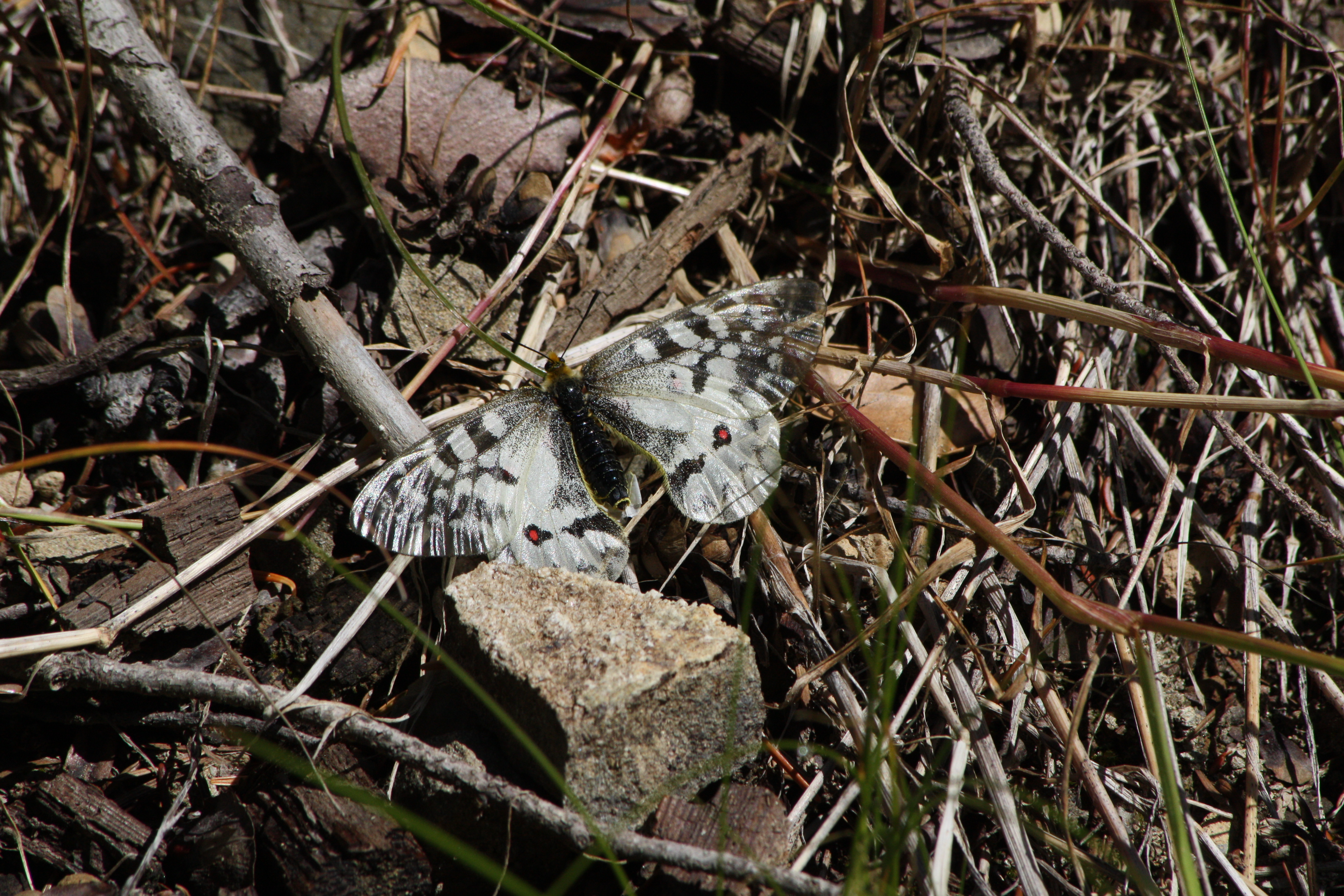
- Washington state

Conservation status
- Secure (NatureServe)

Scientific classification
- Kingdom: Animalia
- Phylum: Arthropoda
- Clade: Pancrustacea
- Class: Insecta
- Order: Lepidoptera
- Family: Papilionidae
- Genus: Parnassius
- Species: P. clodius

Binomial name
- Parnassius clodius Ménétries, 1855

= Parnassius clodius =

Species of butterfly

Parnassius clodius is a species of white butterfly which is found in the United States and Canada. It is a member of the snow Apollo genus (Parnassius) of the swallowtail family (Papilionidae). Its elevation range is 0–7,000 ft (0–2,134 m).

== Description ==
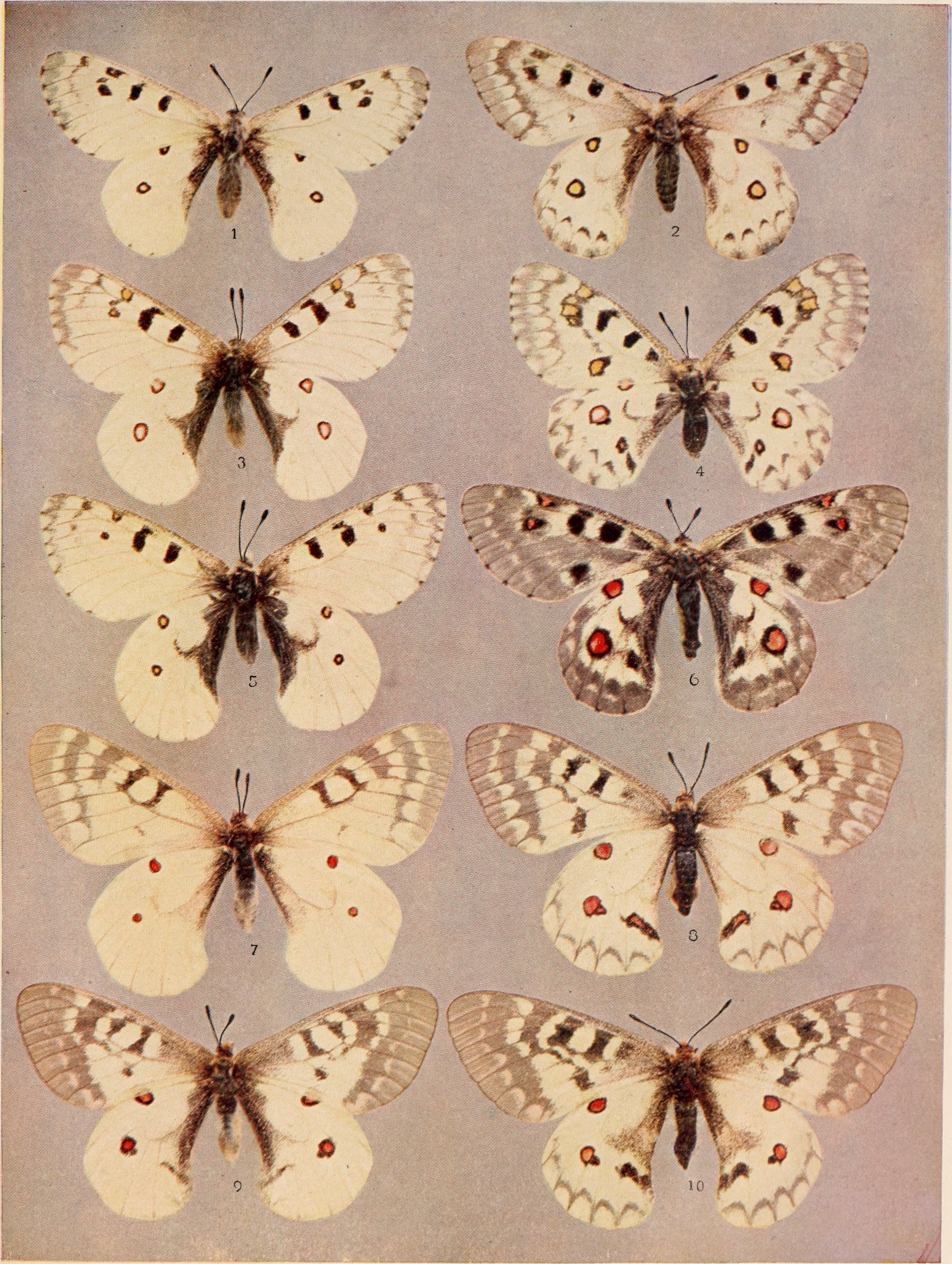
P. clodius and P. smintheus in William Jacob Holland's The Butterfly Book

The wing pattern in Parnassius species is inconsistent and the very many subspecies and forms make identification problematic and uncertain. Structural characters derived from the genitalia, wing venation, sphragis and foretibial epiphysis are more, but not entirely reliable. The description given here is a guide only. For an identification key see Ackery P.R. (1975).

Ground-colour white, only in the female the short costal band placed outside the cell connected with the hindmarginal spot by an irregular dusty band, the glossy submarginal band of the forewing sharp but narrow, the male with small, the female with larger, crescent-shaped submarginal spots on the hindwing; on the latter the anal spot mostly centred with red.

== Distribution ==
It is in western North America in British Columbia, Washington, Oregon, Nevada and California.

== Subspecies ==
- P. c. altaurus Dyar, 1903
- P. c. shepardi Eisner, 1966
- P. c. baldur Edwards, 1877
- P. c. claudianus Stichel, 1907
- P. c. incredibilis Bryk, 1932
- P. c. menetriesii H. Edwards, 1877
- P. c. pseudogallatinus Bryk, 1913
- P. c. sol Bryk & Eisner, 1932
- P. c. strohbeeni Sternitzky

=== Parnassius clodius altaurus ===
It lives in Wyoming (Grand Teton National Park and Greater Yellowstone). It prefers moist meadow habitats with an abundant population of flowering plants. Its host plant is the longhorn steer's head (Dicentra uniflora). It has yellowish instead of red anal spots.

=== Parnassius clodius shepardi ===
It is also known as the Shepard's parnassian. It lives in Wawawai, Snake River Canyon, Washington

=== Parnassius clodius baldur ===
It is distinguished by reduced and less sharp markings. In the male the hindmarginal spot is mostly absent on the forewing and the anal spot on the hindwing; the posterior ocellus is reduced as a rule; the female has no submarginal crescents on the hindwing, the anal spot is rarely centred with red; in both sexes the white dusting very thin, somewhat transparent. Occurs in the mountains to the east of the district of the principal form. Varies rather considerably, and forms on the one hand transitions to the coast form, on the other hand there occurs a further reduction of the pattern. Specimens with point-like, reduced posterior ocellus are not rare. These are ab. lusca Stichel. On the other hand, ab. lorquini Oherth., in which the ocelli are entirely absent, occurs sparingly. In the type of this form in addition all the black markings also are effaced except two narrow oblong spots in the middle and at the end of the cell of the forewing and some blackish dusting at the hindmargin of the hindwing. A further race from Montana, gallatinus Stich., is distinguished by the band-pattern of the male being in general weakly marked, while on the contrary there is a complete discal band outside the cell, as in the female of the typical form; hindwing without anal spot and with small ocelli; the female is more strongly marked, partly dusted over with black, the forewing with broader submarginalband, on the hindwing the submarginal lunulus and the anal spot strongly developed.

=== Parnassius clodius claudianus ===
It lives in the Pacific Northwest. It is larger on the average, with much broadened marginal pattern on the forewing. Marginal and submarginal bands are merged into a broad stripe, through the middle of which runs only one row of small white crescents. In the female the black band-pattern is less intensive but broader, the connection of the costal spot and hindmarginal spot only shadowed as a narrow streak, on the hindwing very large marginal lunules, the anal spot without red dot. There are transitions to the typical form.

=== Parnassius clodius incredibilis ===
It lives on Mount St. Elias, Alaska

=== Parnassius clodius menetriesii ===
It lives in Utah on the Wahsatch Mountains. Its two ocelli only remain as vestiges.

=== Parnassius clodius pseudogallatinus ===
It lives on the British Columbia Cascades of northern Washington.

=== Parnassius clodius sol ===
It lives in California (Tulare to Modoc and southern Siskiyou) on Mount St. Elias. It lives at an elevation usually less than 2,100 metres (6,900 ft)

=== Parnassius clodius strohbeeni ===
It is an extinct subspecies that are similar to P. c. baldur in size. Their host larval plants is the Pacific bleeding-heart (Dicentra formosa). The live on the Santa Cruz mountains of California, specifically in Redwoods, the bottoms of well-lit canyons and streams. This is unusual as other subspecies tend to live at higher elevations. They are mainly white in color with black being present sparsely along its veins (median and internal) of the discal cells and its base of the wing. On its wings, there are red red spots that have black outlines. The body is not heavily covered in hairs. Scales that are located on the top of the thorax and abdomen are moderately elongated. The legs are brown with some white scales.

It was first collected in 1923 by John Strohbeen during a fishing trip in the Santa Cruz mountains of California. Some days later, James Wilson Tilden and Edgar A. Dodge, both entomologist and Lepidopterist, collected another 50 specimens which would be sent off to other collectors. E. A. Doge would send a few to Robert F. Stemitzky who would later describe the specimens as a new subspecies. However the species population and its host plant would drop due to habitat destruction (their collection locality was destroyed by road and summer home construction), and the nursery trade. The last known living member of this subspecies was spotted by J. W. Tilden near the vicinity of Bonny Doon, Mount Len Lemond.
