= Phoebus Apollo =

Phoebus Apollo may refer to:

- Apollo, a figure in Greek and Roman mythology, god of sun, medicine, music, poetry, and sciences. Apollo's chief epithet was Phoebus, literally "bright".
- Parnassius phoebus, a swallowtail butterfly commonly known as the Phoebus Apollo
- A track by Carl Cox on the Hackers soundtrack
