= Nemeris sternitzkyi =

Scientific classification
- Domain: Eukaryota
- Kingdom: Animalia
- Phylum: Arthropoda
- Class: Insecta
- Order: Lepidoptera
- Family: Geometridae
- Genus: Nemeris
- Species: N. sternitzkyi

Binomial name
- Nemeris sternitzkyi Rindge, 1981

Species of moth

Nemeris sternitzkyi is a species of geometrid moth in the family Geometridae. It is found in North America.

The MONA or Hodges number for Nemeris sternitzkyi is 6876.2. It was named, by Frederick H. Rindge in honour of the entomologist, Robert F. Sternitzky.
