= Nemeris =

Scientific classification
- Kingdom: Animalia
- Phylum: Arthropoda
- Clade: Pancrustacea
- Class: Insecta
- Order: Lepidoptera
- Family: Geometridae
- Tribe: Ourapterygini
- Genus: Nemeris; Rindge, 1981

Genus of moths

Nemeris is a genus of moths in the family Geometridae described by Rindge in 1981.

== Species ==
- Nemeris speciosa (Hulst, 1896)
- Nemeris percne Rindge, 1981
- Nemeris sternitzkyi Rindge, 1981
