= Robert F. Sternitzky =

- Born: August 25, 1891
- Died: May 1980 (aged 88)
- Occupations: Lepidopterist; Illustrator

Robert F. Sternitzky (August 25, 1891 - May 1980) was a United States lepidopterist and illustrator. Butterfly and moth specimens he collected are in a number of collections, including those of the Harvard Museum of Natural History, the Essig Museum of Entomology (at the University of California at Berkeley), Manitoba Museum, Nova Scotia Museum, and the Smithsonian National Museum of Natural History. He collected primarily in California and Arizona.

In 1930, he described Plebejus icarioides moroensis (Morro Bay blue or Morro blue), having taken the type specimen at Morro Beach, in San Luis Obispo County, California, on June 1, 1929; it is now known as Aricia icarioides moroensis. In 1937, he described the "Bay checkerspot", Euphydryas editha var. bayensis; it is now known as Euphydryas editha bayensis. In 1945, he described the subspecies Parnassius clodius strohbeeni.

He was accompanied on some collecting trips by Charles Henry Ingham.

He painted a plate depicting seventeen larvae and pupae, in color, for John Adams Comstock's Butterflies of California. The book was published in 1927 in very small editions, and is now rare. A facsimile edition was published in 1989; Sternitzky's is the only plate reproduced in color.

In April 1948 he notified the Lepidopterists' Society of a change of address, to Laytonville, Mendocino County. The same issue carried his advertisement, both for specimens sold commercially, and his services as an illustrator for museums.

He died in 1980. Some of his specimens were purchased by Cyril Franklin dos Passos.

The species Nemeris sternitzkyi was named in his honor by Frederick H. Rindge in 1981, as had been Parnassius phoebus sternitzkyi (Sternitzky's parnassian), by James Halliday McDunnough, in 1936; the latter is now known as Parnassius smintheus sternitzkyi.

Claude Lemaire et al. have questioned the accuracy of some of the locations on Sternitzky's specimen labels.

== Papers ==
- "A New Subspecies of Plebejus icarioides Bdv". Pan-Pacific Entomologist. 7 (2): 93–94. 1930.
- "Another Rare Species Located". Pan-Pacific Entomologist. 9 (3): 102. 1933.
- "A Race of Euphydryas editha Bdv. (Lepidoptera)". Canadian Entomologist. 69 (9): 203–205. 1937. doi:10.4039/Ent69203-9. S2CID 84102539.
- "A new race of Parnassius clodius". Men. Proceedings of the New England Zoological Club. 23: 81–82. 1945.
