= Nemeris speciosa =

Scientific classification
- Kingdom: Animalia
- Phylum: Arthropoda
- Class: Insecta
- Order: Lepidoptera
- Family: Geometridae
- Genus: Nemeris
- Species: N. speciosa

Binomial name
- Nemeris speciosa (Hulst, 1896)

Synonyms
- Diastictis speciosa Hulst, 1896

Species of moth

Nemeris speciosa is a species of geometrid moth in the family Geometridae. It is found in North America.

The MONA or Hodges number for Nemeris speciosa is 6876.
