= Sarmentosin =

Chemical compound

Names
- IUPAC name (E)-2-(hydroxymethyl)-4-[(2R,3R,4S,5S,6R)-3,4,5-trihydroxy-6-(hydroxymethyl)oxan-2-yl]oxybut-2-enenitrile

Identifiers
CAS Number	71933-54-5
3D model (JSmol)	Interactive image
ChEBI	CHEBI:9033
ChemSpider	4444567
KEGG	C08340
PubChem CID	5281123
CompTox Dashboard (EPA)	DTXSID601318121
- InChI: InChI=1S/C11H17NO7/c12-3-6(4-13)1-2-18-11-10(17)9(16)8(15)7(5-14)19-11/h1,7-11,13-17H,2,4-5H2/b6-1+/t7-,8-,9+,10-,11-/m1/s1 Key: FWAYDNJCBHNWQD-JBWLPIRVSA-N
- SMILES: C(/C=C(/CO)\C#N)O[C@H]1[C@@H]([C@H]([C@@H]([C@H](O1)CO)O)O)O

Properties
Chemical formula	C_{11}H_{17}NO_{7}
Molar mass	275.257 g·mol^{−1}
- Except where otherwise noted, data are given for materials in their standard state (at 25 °C [77 °F], 100 kPa). Infobox references

Sarmentosin is a glycoside and that is found in several plant species, notably Ribes nigrum (blackcurrants) and Sedum sarmentosum.

== Chemical structure ==
Sarmentosin has a molecular formula of C_{11}H_{17}NO_{7} and a molecular weight of 275.25 g/mol. Its IUPAC name is (E)-2-(hydroxymethyl)-4-[(2R,3R,4S,5S,6R)-3,4,5-trihydroxy-6-(hydroxymethyl)oxan-2-yl]oxybut-2-enenitrile.

== Sources ==
Sarmentosin can be extracted from plants in the Rhodiola genus and blackcurrants. Recent studies have specifically identified sarmentosin as a key bioactive compound in blackcurrants that contributes to its monoamine oxidase inhibitory effects.

== Ecology ==
At least two Parnassius butterflies, Parnassius apollo and Parnassius smintheus, sequester sarmentosin and other hydroxynitrile glucosides in their bodies from the Sedum plants they eat.
