= Nemeris percne =

Scientific classification
- Kingdom: Animalia
- Phylum: Arthropoda
- Clade: Pancrustacea
- Class: Insecta
- Order: Lepidoptera
- Family: Geometridae
- Tribe: Ourapterygini
- Genus: Nemeris
- Species: N. percne

Binomial name
- Nemeris percne Rindge, 1981

Species of moth

Nemeris percne is a species of geometrid moth in the family Geometridae. It is found in North America.
