= Wawawai County Park =

Park in Washington, United States

Coordinates: 46°38′11″N 117°22′35″W

Wawawai County Park is a county park at Wawawai in Whitman County, Washington, United States.
