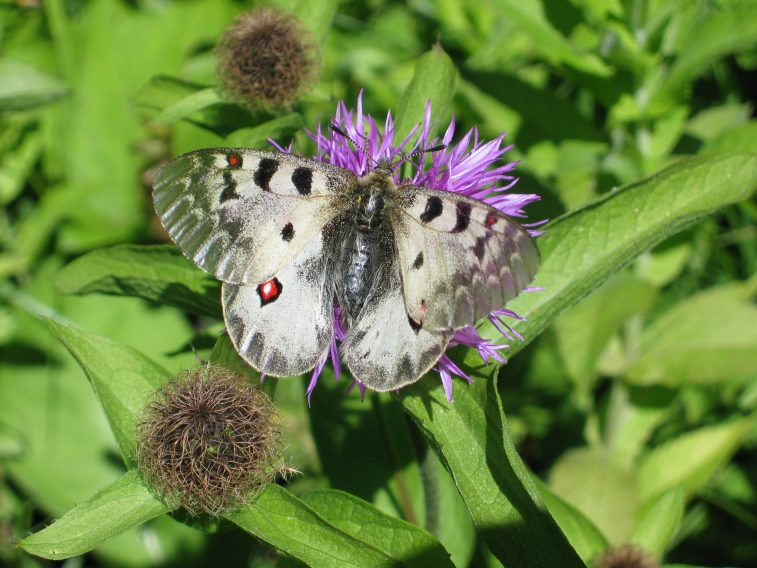

Conservation status
- Secure (NatureServe)

Scientific classification
- Kingdom: Animalia
- Phylum: Arthropoda
- Clade: Pancrustacea
- Class: Insecta
- Order: Lepidoptera
- Family: Papilionidae
- Genus: Parnassius
- Species: P. phoebus

Binomial name
- Parnassius phoebus (Fabricius, 1793)

= Parnassius phoebus =

Species of butterfly

Parnassius phoebus, known as the Phoebus Apollo or small Apollo, is a butterfly species of the swallowtail butterfly family, Papilionidae, found in the Palearctic and North America.

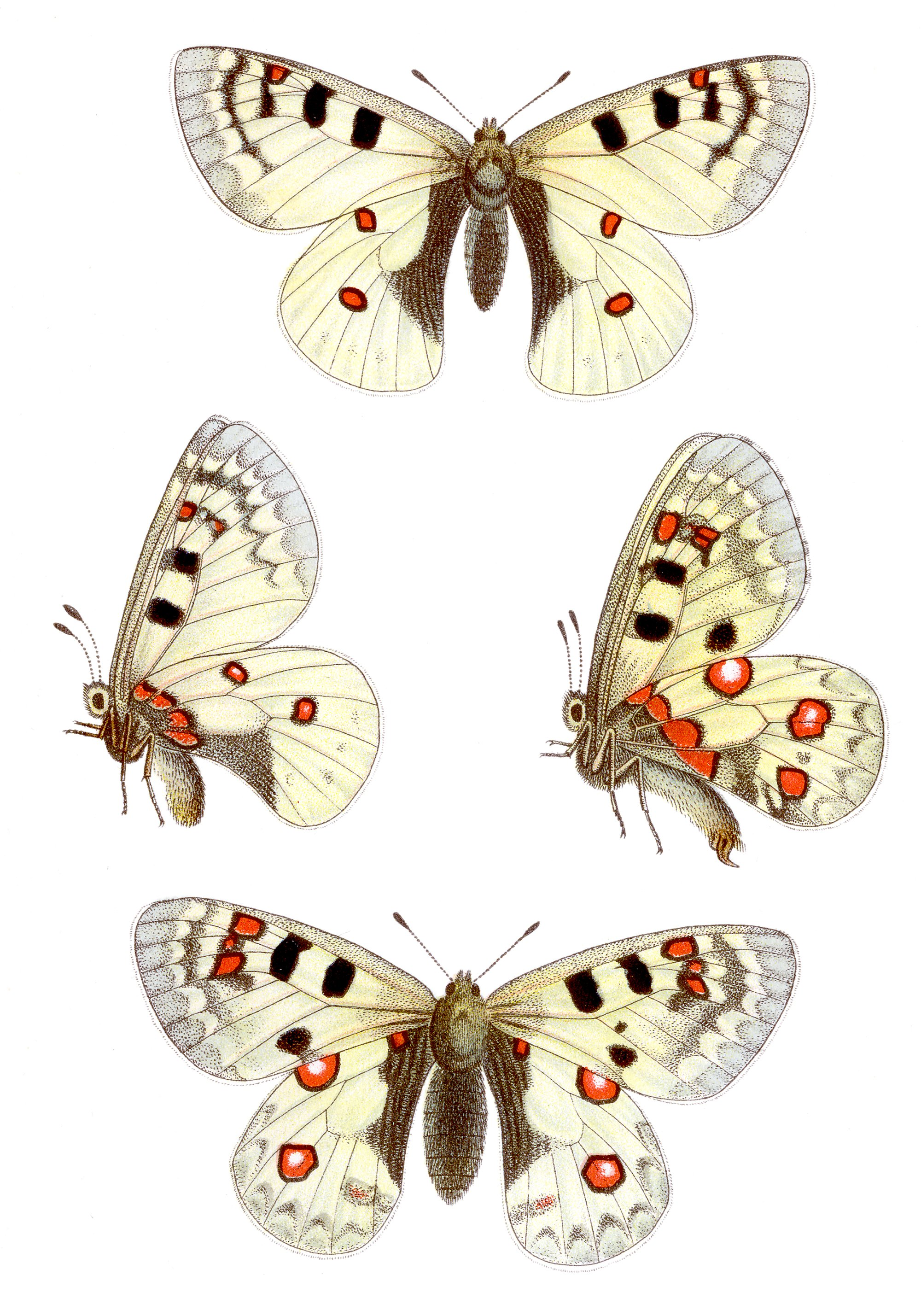
From Jacob Hübner's Das kleine Schmetterlingsbuch

P. phoebus is found in the Alps, Urals, Siberia, Kazakhstan, Mongolia, China, Alaska and Canada south into the northern United States.

== Description ==
Male: the costal spots of forewing usually without red, the anterior one sometimes with white pupil; submarginal band faint and abbreviated or interrupted; no spot at hind margin; hindwing with red ocelli which are usually small, and sometimes with a submarginal row of feebly marked black spots; the veins often marked with well-defined elongate black punctures.

Female: with better defined and more extended markings; vitreous margin of forewing separated from the submarginal band by large white uniform spots; the second costal spots often pupilled red, connected with one another by black scaling, on disc sometimes blackish shadows; on hindwing a greyish vitreous marginal band, distinct submarginal half-moons, which are contiguous, forming a band, two larger red ocelli, the posterior one occasionally with white pupil; anal spots sometimes intensified and one of them filled in with red.

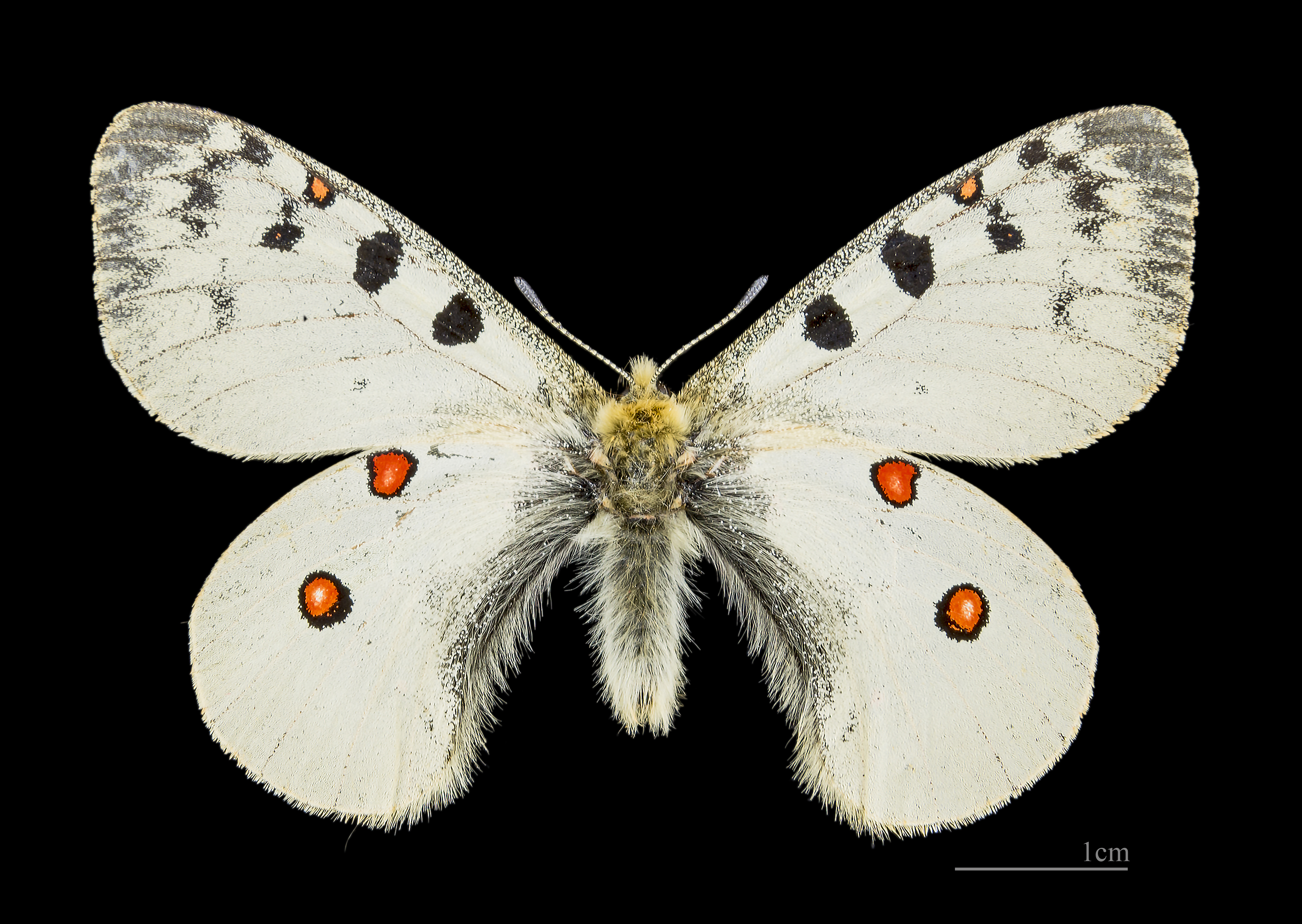
Male

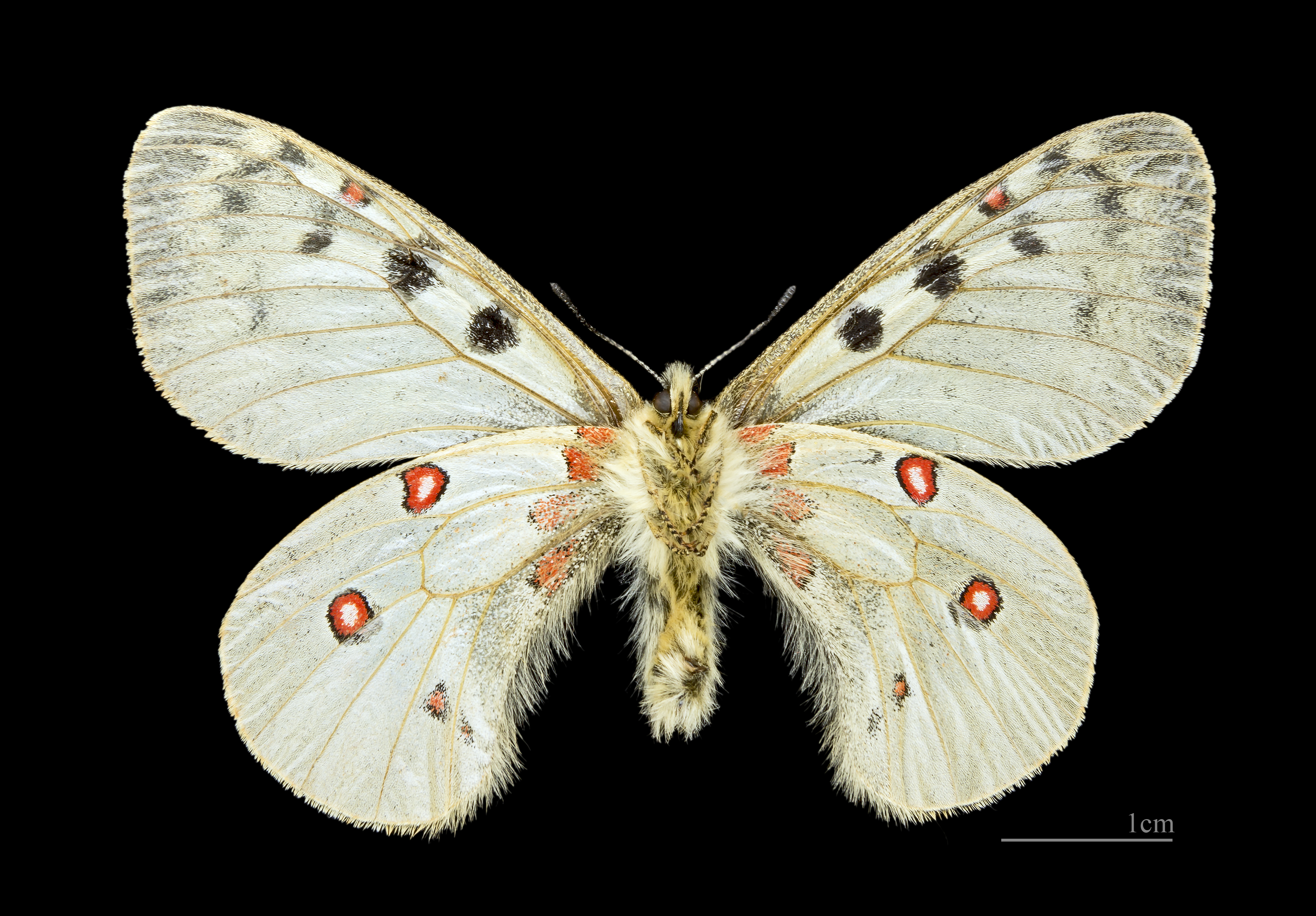
Male, bottom

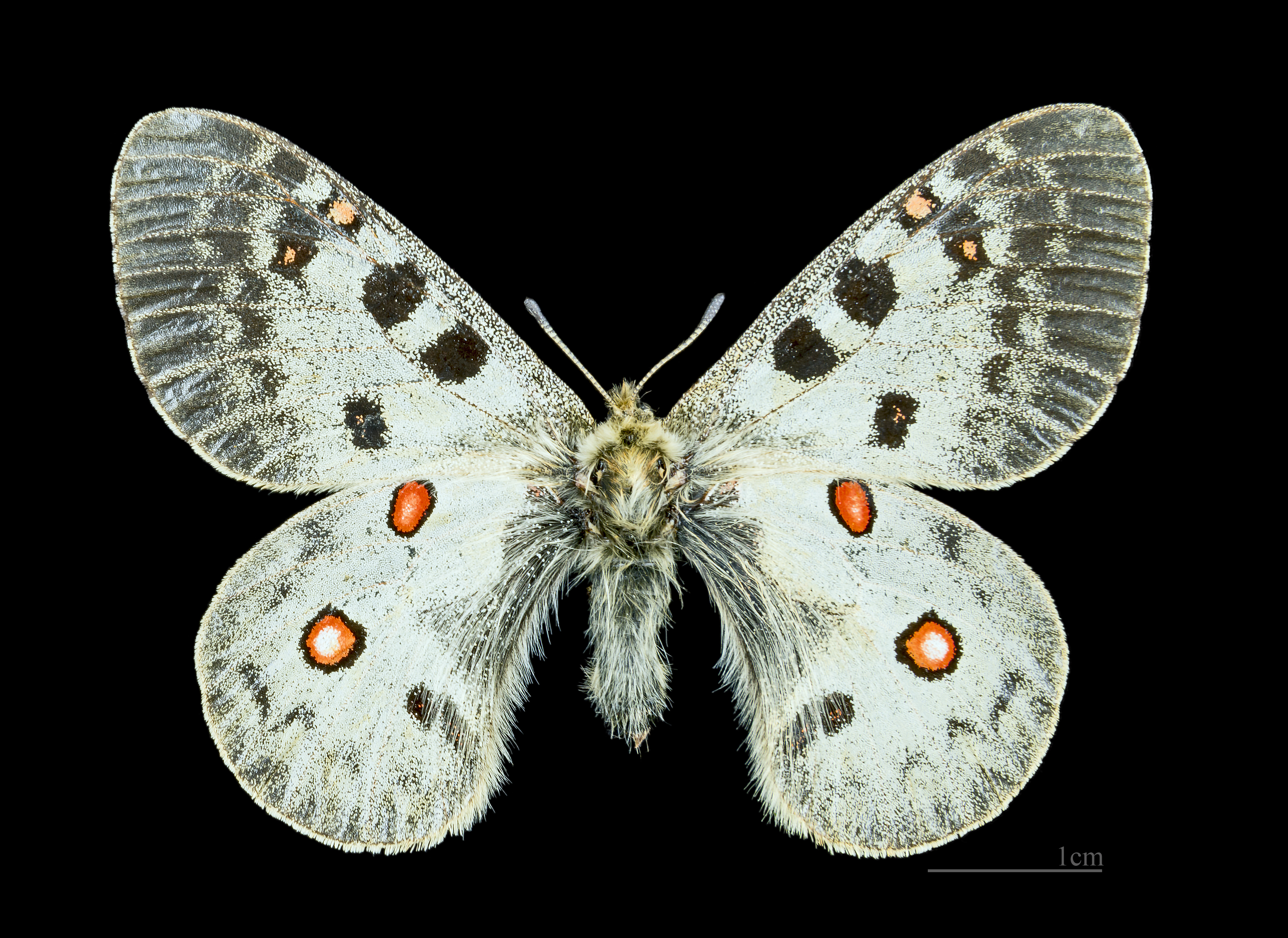
Female

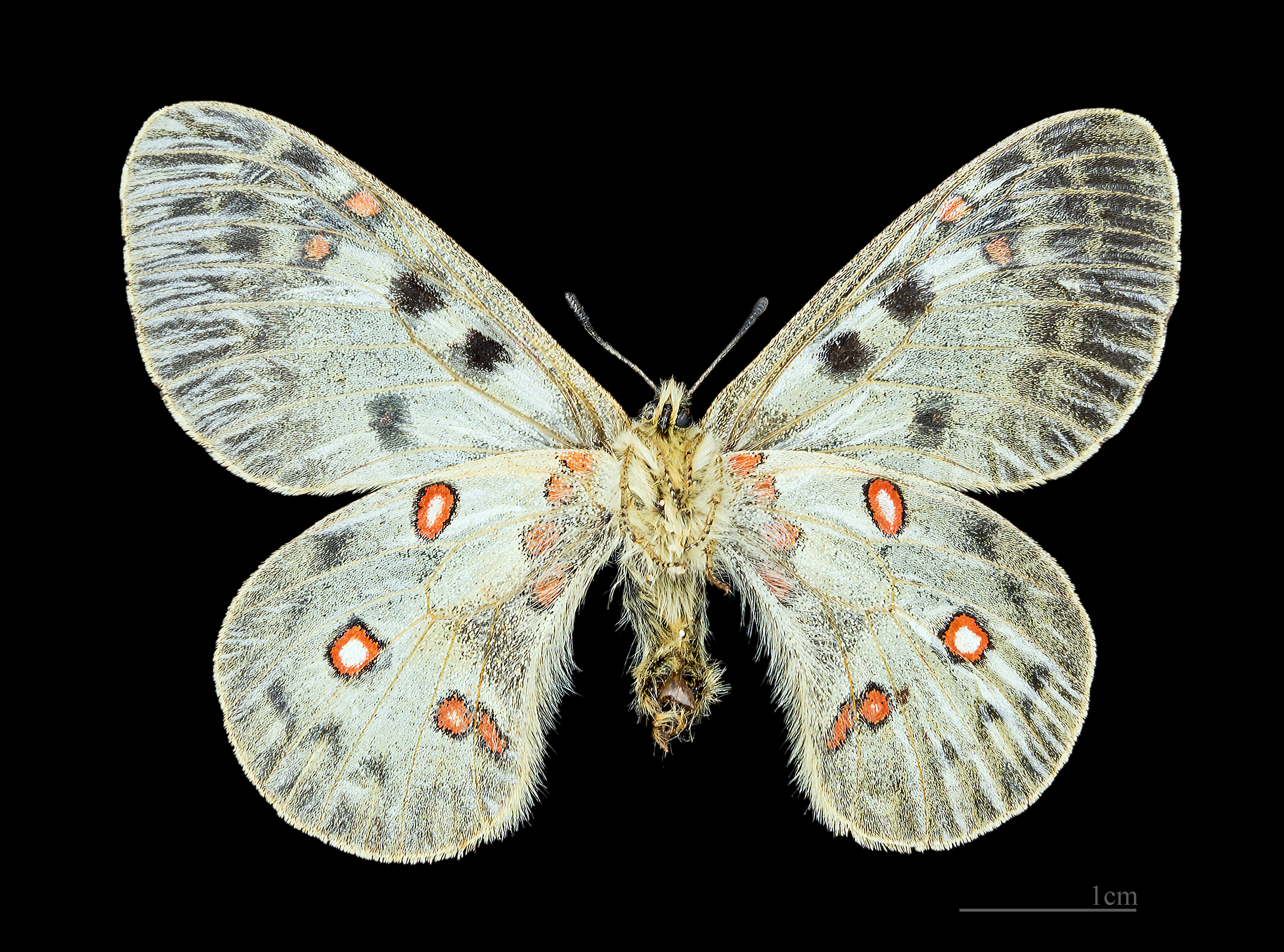
Female, bottom

== Habitat ==
Mountains at 1,600 to 2,800 meters, in particular between 1,800 and 2,200 meters above sea level, in humid damp and wet places such as edges of mountain streams and near springs and fresh seepages and in valleys (Schneetälchen) according to the preferences of its caterpillar food plant.

== Larval foods ==
- Saxifraga species
- Sedum species
- Sempervivum montanum

== Subspecies ==
P. phoebus has the following subspecies:

- Parnassius phoebus alpestris Verity, 1911
- Parnassius phoebus var. anna Stichel, 1907
- Parnassius phoebus aktashicus
- Parnassius phoebus alaskensis Eisner, 1956
- Parnassius phoebus altaica Ménétriés, 1859
- Parnassius phoebus amalthea Bryk & Eisner, 1935
- Parnassius phoebus ampliusmaculata Bryk, 1929
- Parnassius phoebus apricatus Stichel, 1906
- Parnassius phoebus var. aristion Fruhstorfer, 1923
- Parnassius phoebus var. astriotes Fruhstorfer, 1923
- Parnassius phoebus badmaevi Martynenko & Gluschenko, 2001
- Parnassius phoebus bajangolus Yakovlev, 2006
- Parnassius phoebus basimaculata Bryk & Eisner, 1935
- Parnassius phoebus biexcelsior Bryk & Eisner, 1935
- Parnassius phoebus var. blachieri Fruhstorfer, 1921
- Parnassius phoebus bulawskii
- Parnassius phoebus catullius Fruhstorfer, 1923
- Parnassius phoebus cardinalis Oberthür, 1891
- Parnassius phoebus var. casta Stichel, 1907
- Parnassius phoebus cerenus Martin, 1922
- Parnassius phoebus chingizid Yakovlev, 2006
- Parnassius phoebus var. confederationis Fruhstorfer, 1921
- Parnassius phoebus corybas Fischer De Waldheim, 1836
- Parnassius phoebus costalinigroocellata Bryk & Eisner, 1935
- Parnassius phoebus crocedominensis Nardelli & Sala, 1986
- Parnassius phoebus cubitalis Bryk & Eisner 1937
- Parnassius phoebus var. cutullius Fruhstorfer, 1923
- Parnassius phoebus dakotaensis Bryk & Eisner, 1935
- Parnassius phoebus discocircumcincta Eisner 1955
- Parnassius phoebus eisneri Bryk, 1928
- Parnassius phoebus elias Bryk, 1934
- Parnassius phoebus ernaeides Bryk & Eisner, 1937
- Parnassius phoebus ernestinae Bryk & Eisner, 1935
- Parnassius phoebus var. expectatus Fruhstorfer, 1921
- Parnassius phoebus fermata Bryk, 1921
- Parnassius phoebus festal Turati, 1932
- Parnassius phoebus flavomaculata Moltrecht, 1933
- Parnassius phoebus fortuna A Bang-Haas, 1912
- Parnassius phoebus var. gulschenkoi Iwamoto, 1997
- Parnassius phoebus gazelii Previel, 1936
- Parnassius phoebus golovinus Holland, 1930
- Parnassius phoebus grundi Bryk & Eisner, 1935
- Parnassius phoebus guppyi Wyatt, 1971
- Parnassius phoebus halasicus Huang & Murayama, 1992
- Parnassius phoebus hansi Bryk, 1945
- Parnassius phoebus hardwicki Kane, 1885
- Parnassius phoebus hermador dos Passos, 1964
- Parnassius phoebus hermadur Brown & Eff & Rotger, 1856
- Parnassius phoebus var. hermiston Fruhstorfer, 1922
- Parnassius phoebus herrichi Oberthür, 1891
- Parnassius phoebus hollandi Bryk & Eisner, 1935
- Parnassius phoebus intermedius Ménétriés,1849
- Parnassius phoebus intermedioides Storace, 1951
- Parnassius phoebus interpositus Herz, 1903
- Parnassius phoebus kamtchatica Ménétries, 1886
- Parnassius phoebus lessini Sala, 1996
- Parnassius phoebus leonhardi Rühl ,1892
- Parnassius phoebus leucostigma Austaut, 1912
- Parnassius phoebus manitobaensis Bryk & Eisner, 1935
- Parnassius phoebus mariae Bryk, 1912
- Parnassius phoebus melanica Verity, 1911
- Parnassius phoebus melanophorus Bryk, 1921
- Parnassius phoebus mendicus Stichel ,1907
- Parnassius phoebus minor Verity, 1907
- Parnassius phoebus minusculus Bryk,1912
- Parnassius phoebus montanulus Bryk & Eisner, 1931
- Parnassius phoebus montanus Ehrmann, 1918
- Parnassius phoebus muelleri Uffeln, 1920
- Parnassius phoebus nanus Neumoegen, 1890
- Parnassius phoebus nigerrimus Verity, 1907
- Parnassius phoebus nigrescens Wheeler 1903
- Parnassius phoebus nikolaii Asahi, Kohara, Kanda & Kawata, 1999
- Parnassius phoebus nox Bryk & Eisner, 1935
- Parnassius phoebus ocellata Verity, 1907
- Parnassius phoebus ochotskensis Bryk & Eisner, 1931
- Parnassius phoebus orbifer Bryk & Eisner, 1935
- Parnassius phoebus var. palamedes Hemming, 1934
- Parnassius phoebus paradisiacus Turati, 1932
- Parnassius phoebus phoebus
- Parnassius phoebus pholus Barnes & Benjamin, 1926
- Parnassius phoebus plurimaculata Nitsche, 1913
- Parnassius phoebus polus Ehrmann, 1917
- Parnassius phoebus pseudocorybas Verity, 1907
- Parnassius phoebus quincunx Bryk ,1915
- Parnassius phoebus reducta O. Bang-Haas, 1938
- Parnassius phoebus rocky Grum-Grshimallo ,1890
- Parnassius phoebus rotgeri Bang-Haas, 1938
- Parnassius phoebus rubina Wyatt, 1961
- Parnassius phoebus rueckbeili Deckert, 1909
- Parnassius phoebus sacerdozi Fruhstorfer, 1906
- Parnassius phoebus sauricus Lukhtanov, 1999
- Parnassius phoebus savoieensis Eisner, 1957
- Parnassius phoebus sedakovi Ménétriés, 1850
- Parnassius phoebus var. serenus Fruhstorfer, 1921
- Parnassius phoebus sordellus Fruhstorfer, 1923
- Parnassius phoebus styriacus Fruhstorfer, 1851
- Parnassius phoebus tersa Verity, 1947
- Parnassius phoebus tessinorum Fruhstorfer, 1921
- Parnassius phoebus tsenguun Churkin, 2003
- Parnassius phoebus uralensis Ménétriés, 1859
- Parnassius phoebus utahensis Rothschild, 1918
- Parnassius phoebus vaschenkoi Hirschfeld & Schäffler, 2004
- Parnassius phoebus velutus Martin, 1922
- Parnassius phoebus verity Ehrmann, 1918
- Parnassius phoebus veronicolus Martin, 1922
- Parnassius phoebus werschoturovi O. Bang-Haas, 1934
- Parnassius phoebus var. virginea Austaut, 1910
- Parnassius phoebus vorbrodti Bryk & Eisner, 1943
- Parnassius phoebus xanthus Ehrmann, 1918
- Parnassius phoebus zamolodtschikovi A. Belik, 1996

== Similar species ==
Parnassius smintheus, which is a closely related species found in North America, is sometimes classified as a subspecies of Parnassius phoebus. Some researchers also tend to split the North American populations of P. smintheus into two or three species, the northernmost of which are usually accepted as being part of P. phoebus, while the rest are considered to be P. smintheus, though sometimes P. behrii is treated as a species, rather than a subspecies of smintheus.
