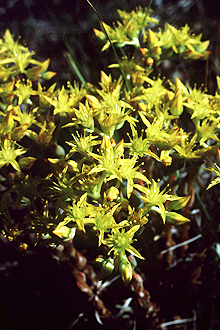

Scientific classification
- Kingdom: Plantae
- Clade: Tracheophytes
- Clade: Angiosperms
- Clade: Eudicots
- Order: Saxifragales
- Family: Crassulaceae
- Genus: Sedum
- Species: S. stenopetalum

Binomial name
- Sedum stenopetalum Pursh

Synonyms
- Amerosedum stenopetalum

= Sedum stenopetalum =

Plant species in the stonecrop family

Sedum stenopetalum, also known as wormleaf stonecrop or narrow-petaled stonecrop, is a species of flowering plant in the stonecrop family. It is native to western North America from British Columbia and Alberta to northern California to Wyoming. It can be found in many types of rocky habitat, such as cliffs, talus, and steep ridges. It is a succulent plant producing mats or clumps of lance-shaped, linear, or three-lobed leaves each under 2 centimeters long. The inflorescence is a short, erect array of one to many flowers with lance-shaped petals up to a centimeter long. The petals are yellow, sometimes with red veins.

== Taxonomy ==
Sedum stenopetalum is classified in the Sedum genus in the family Crassulaceae. It was scientifically described and named by Frederick Traugott Pursh in 1813.

=== Subspecies and varieties ===
The species has two accepted subspecies and one accepted variety.

==== Sedum stenopetalum subsp. ciliosum ====
Subspecies ciliosum was first described by Thomas Jefferson Howell as a species named Sedum ciliosum in 1898. It was reclassified as a subspecies by Robert Theodore Clausen in 1948. It only grows in the state of Oregon.

==== Sedum stenopetalum var. monanthum ====
Variety monanthum was initially described as a species in 1898 by Thomas Howell, but with the illegitimate name Sedum uniflorum. It was then described by Wilhelm Nikolaus Suksdorf in 1927, again as a species, but this time with the name Sedum monanthum. It was reclassified as a variety of Sedum stenopetalum under its present name by Hideaki Ohba in 2007.

==== Sedum stenopetalum subsp. stenopetalum ====
The autonymic subspecies grows in western Canada and the northwestern United States.

=== Synonyms ===
Sedum stenopetalum has 18 synonyms of the species or one of its subspecies or variety.

Table of Synonyms
Name	Year	Rank	Synonym of:	Notes
Amerosedum radiatum subsp. ciliosum (Howell) Á.Löve & D.Löve	1985	species	subsp. ciliosum	≡ hom.
Amerosedum stenopetalum (Pursh) Á.Löve & D.Löve	1985	species	S. stenopetalum	≡ hom.
Amerosedum stenopetalum subsp. monanthum (Suksd.) Á.Löve & D.Löve	1985	species	var. monanthum	≡ hom.
Sedum ciliosum Howell	1898	species	subsp. ciliosum	≡ hom.
Sedum coerulescens Haw.	1825	species	subsp. stenopetalum	= het.
Sedum douglasii Hook.	1832	species	subsp. stenopetalum	= het.
Sedum douglasii subsp. ciliosum (Howell) R.T.Clausen	1946	subspecies	subsp. ciliosum	≡ hom.
Sedum douglasii var. monanthum (Suksd.) Fröd.	1935	variety	var. monanthum	≡ hom.
Sedum douglasii var. uniflorum M.E.Jones	1910	variety	var. monanthum	≡ hom.
Sedum douglasii f. uniflorum (M.E.Jones) G.N.Jones	1936	form	var. monanthum	≡ hom.
Sedum monanthum Suksd.	1927	species	var. monanthum	≡ hom.
Sedum radiatum subsp. ciliosum (Howell) R.T.Clausen	1975	subspecies	subsp. ciliosum	≡ hom.
Sedum radiatum var. ciliosum (Howell) H.Ohba	2007	variety	subsp. ciliosum	≡ hom.
Sedum stenopetalum subsp. monanthum (Suksd.) R.T.Clausen	1975	subspecies	var. monanthum	≡ hom.
Sedum stenopetalum subsp. typicum R.T.Clausen	1948	subspecies	S. stenopetalum	≡ hom. not validly publ.
Sedum stenophyllum Fröd.	1943	species	subsp. stenopetalum	= het.
Sedum subclavatum Haw.	1831	species	subsp. stenopetalum	= het.
Sedum uniflorum Howell	1898	species	var. monanthum	≡ hom. nom. illeg.
Notes: ≡ homotypic synonym; = heterotypic synonym

=== Names ===
It is known by the common names wormleaf stonecrop or narrow-petaled stonecrop.
