= Wawawai, Washington =

Ghost town in Washington (state)

- Ghost town
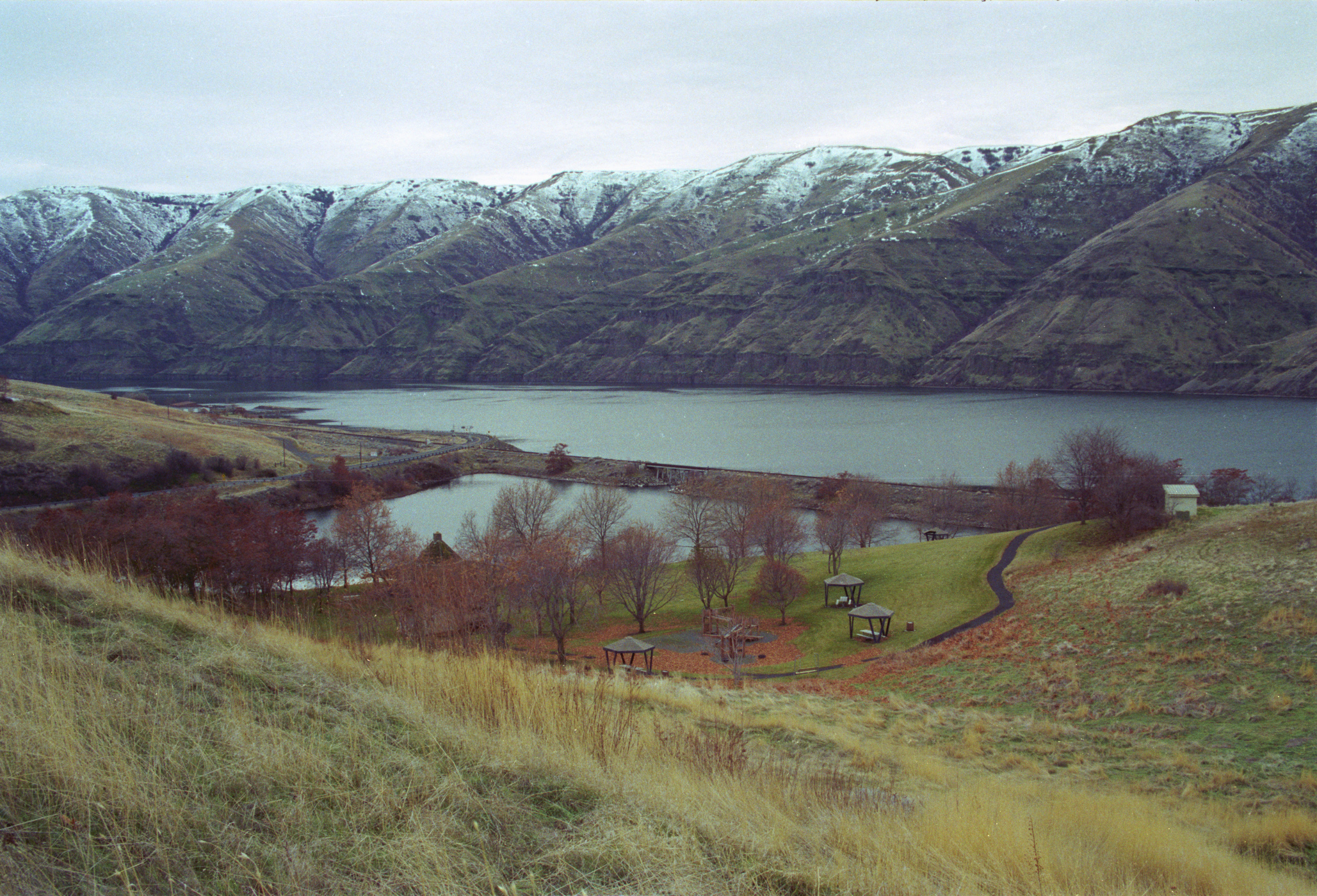
- Wawawai County Park

- Location within Washington (state)
- Coordinates: 46°38′12″N 117°22′46″W
- Country: United States
- State: Washington
- County: Whitman
- Platted: 1878
- Elevation: 738 ft (225 m)
- Time zone: UTC-8 (Pacific (PST))
  - Summer (DST): UTC-7 (PDT)
- ZIP Codes: 99113
- GNIS feature ID: 1510419

Wawawai is a former town in the south central part of Whitman County, Washington in the United States. It got its name from a Nez Perce word said to mean "council ground." (John Knight, in Names MSS. Letter 225.) The town was platted in 1878 and served a community of orchards along the Snake River. The river would ultimately lead to Wawawai's demise as water rose behind Lower Granite Dam, which was completed in 1975, and submerged what was once Wawawai under 80 feet of water. Wawawai County Park is located along the banks of the river immediately above the former town site.

== History ==
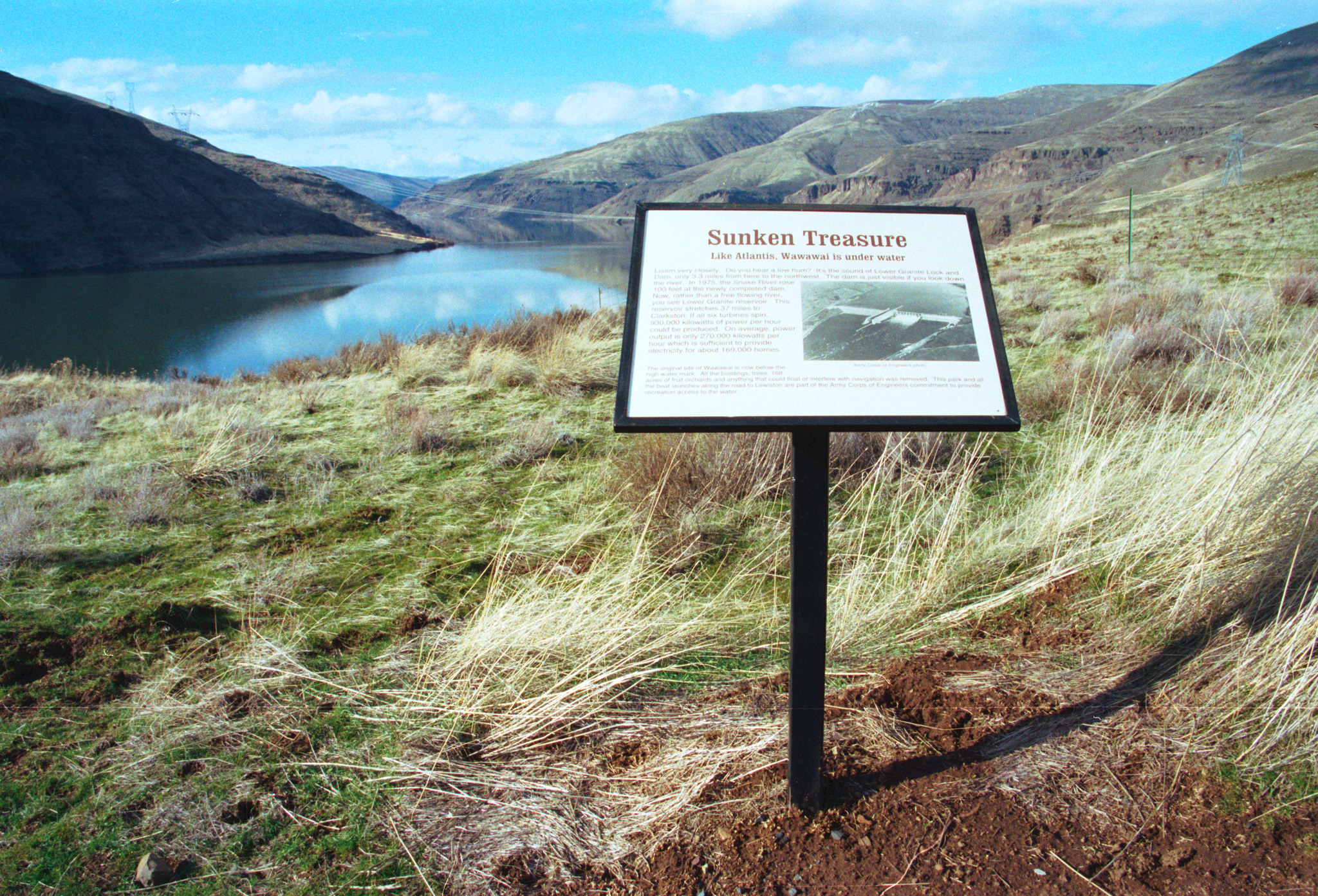
Informative sign at Wawawai County Park describing the inundation of the community

The area that would become Wawawai was periodically inhabited for centuries by people of the Palouse and Nez Perce tribes. Its original name was Wawawa, a Nez Perce term for council ground. Isiah Matheny, the first white settler, arrived in 1875 and planted an apple orchard. Other settlers soon followed and planted more apple and other fruit orchards around Matheny's. A town site was platted in 1878 but just six years later residents requested that the county vacate the town and leave the land for agricultural purposes. By 1885 the informal town had its own post office, and a decade later a school was built. Rail transport reached the community in 1907 with the arrival of the Snake River Valley Railroad.

Harvests at the orchards in and surrounding Wawawai brought groups of laborers from nearby tribes as well as immigrants from China into the community. These segregated communities existed through the 1920s and into the 1930s when they began to be replaced by students from Washington State University in nearby Pullman.

Decline began with the arrival of automation to the harvest process in the 1930s, and continued with cost increases after World War II. The reduced need for manual labor at harvest contributed as well. The ferry crossing the Snake River at Wawawai made its last trip in 1959. The town's post office closed in 1967. The impending inundation as water rose behind the planned Lower Granite Dam a few miles downstream of Wawawai was known by the 1960s, and most of the town was steadily shuttered, with buildings and orchards removed. On February 15, 1975, water began rising behind the dam, removing Wawawai from the map.

In 1979, Whitman County established Wawawai County Park on the banks of the Snake River, above the former town and orchards.

In July 2023, the town gave its name to the Wawawai Fire which burned more than 500 acres on the slopes above the river near the former town.
