= Belle Isle Conservatory =

Greenhouse and botanical garden in Detroit, Michigan, U.S.

Anna Scripps Whitcomb Conservatory
- Belle Isle Conservatory
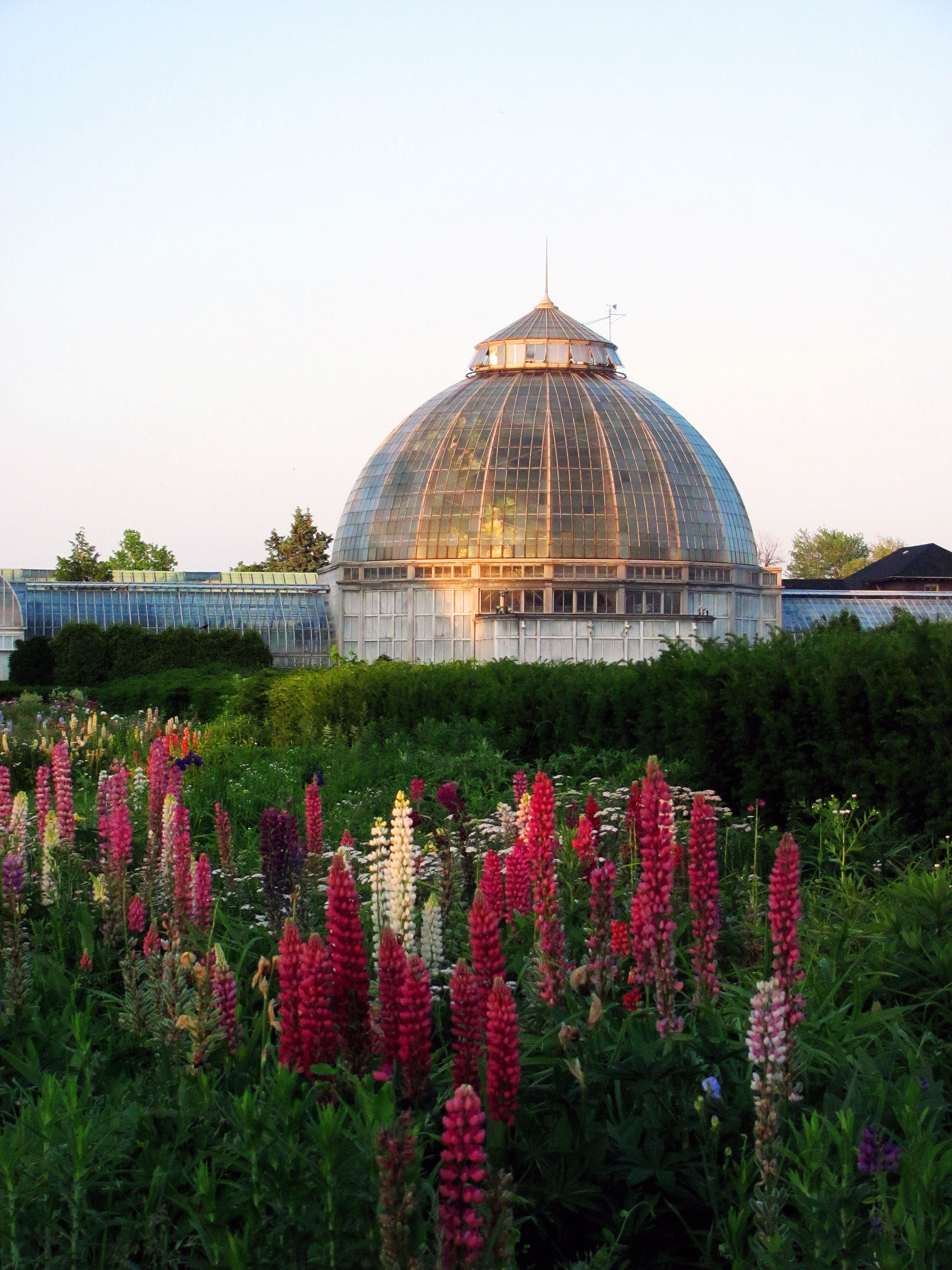
- Interactive map of Anna Scripps Whitcomb Conservatory
- Type: Botanical garden and greenhouse
- Location: Belle Isle Park; Detroit, Michigan
- Coordinates: 42°20′32″N 82°58′46″W
- Area: 13 acres (5.3 ha)
- Opened: August 18, 1904; 121 years ago
- Designer: George D. Mason & Albert Kahn
- Etymology: In April 1953, Anna Scripps Whitcomb gave her 600 orchids collection to the conservatory
- Operator: State of Michigan
- Open: 10 a.m. to 5 p.m. (EST)
- Status: Reopened in 2024 after renovation.
- Website: belleisleconservancy.org

The Anna Scripps Whitcomb Conservatory (commonly and locally known as the Belle Isle Conservatory) is a greenhouse and a botanical garden located on Belle Isle, a 982-acre (397-hectare) island park located on the Detroit River within Detroit, Michigan. While located near the Canada–United States border, the island is entirely within the U.S. The park itself consists of 13 acres (5.3 hectares) of preserved land for the conservatory and its botanical garden.

Opened in 1904, the Anna Scripps Whitcomb Conservatory is the oldest continually-running conservatory in the United States. It is named for Anna Scripps Whitcomb, who left her collection of 600 orchids to Detroit in 1955.

== History and architecture ==
The Belle Isle Conservatory, along with the neighboring Belle Isle Aquarium, was designed by the noted firm of George D. Mason and Albert Kahn, and built between 1902 and 1904. Kahn modeled the building after architectural exhibitions and garden pavilions of the mid- to late-nineteenth century, most notably The Crystal Palace and the Palm House at Kew Gardens.

Located in the center of the 982-acre (397-hectare) Belle Isle Park, the conservatory covers 13 acres (5.3 hectares), with a lily pond on its north side and perennial gardens on the west; the gardens house the Levi L. Barbour Memorial Fountain, designed by sculptor Marshall Fredericks. The Conservatory building is divided into five distinct sections: the Palm house (inside the domed center), the Tropical house (South Wing), the Cactus house and Fernery (North Wing), and the Show house (East Wing). The main feature of the building is the 85 feet (26 m) high central dome, which houses palm trees and other tropical plants.

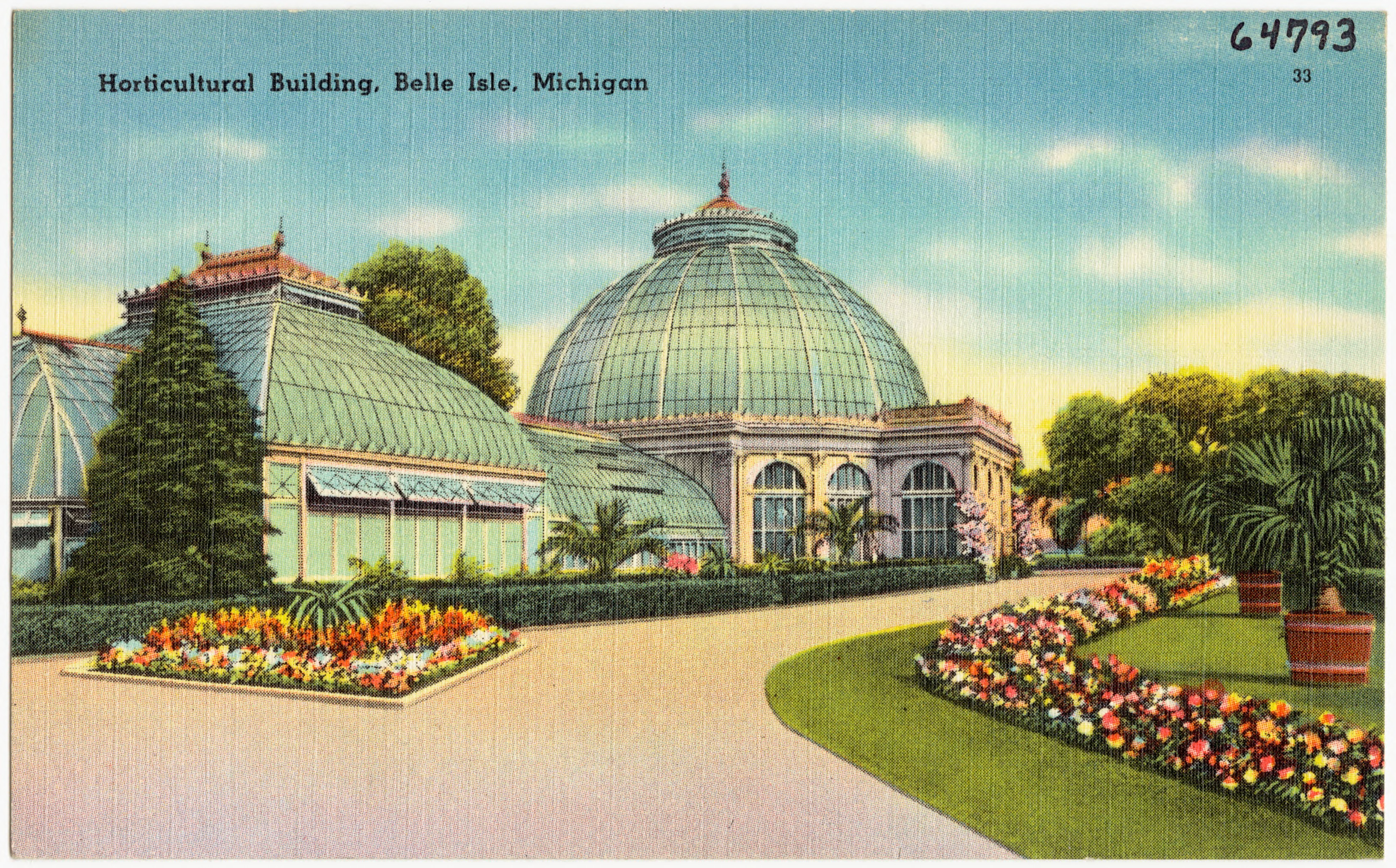
Old postcard of the conservatory, showing the original wooden structure

The conservatory, originally known as the Horticultural Building, opened on August 18, 1904, and is currently "the oldest, continually operating conservatory in the United States." Soon after its opening, it became a popular attraction, reaching an annual average of 1.5 million visitors in the mid-1920s. In 1953, the original wooden frame of the central dome was replaced by one made of iron and aluminum; the operation cost circa $500,000.

In April 1955 Anna Scripps Whitcomb gave her 600 orchids collection to the conservatory, which was therefore renamed in her honor on April 6, 1955. Many of these exotic orchids had been saved from Britain throughout World War II. Because of that contribution, the conservatory became "the largest municipally owned orchid collection in the country."

== Botany ==
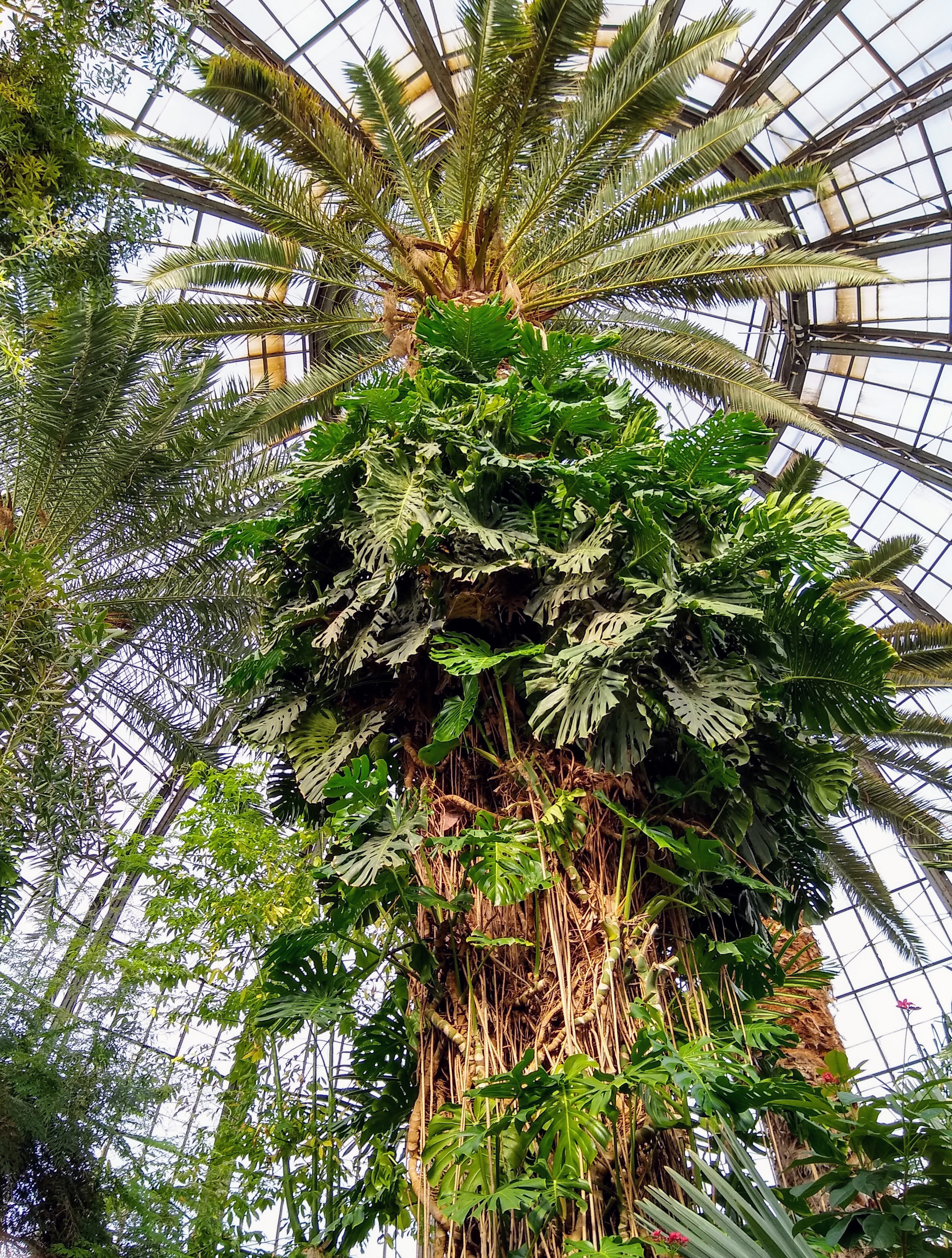
Palm Tree.

The Palm house, maintained at 70 °F, is housed under the dome, and contains a variety of tropical trees and palms, including the Chinese fan palm (Livistona chinensis), the fishtail palm (Caryota mitis), the umbrella tree (Heptapleurum actinophylla) and the Canary Island date palm (Phoenix canariensis). When a tree reaches the top of the dome it must be cut down, as they cannot be pruned to height.

The Tropical house, 70 °F, contains fruiting plants and trees such as the common fig, calamondin orange and bloodleaf banana, and tropical flowering plants such as the pink powderpuff (Calliandra brevipes) and peace lily (Spathiphyllum).

The Cactus house, 62 °F, is lined in tufa rock and holds a variety of cacti and succulents, including jellybeans (Sedum pachyphyllum), the silver dollar cactus (Opuntia robusta), "old man" cactus (Cephalocereus senilis) and jade plant (Crassula ovata).

The Fernery is sunken to provide cooler conditions and more humidity. Ferns such as the alsophila can be found here, as well as a small waterfall located in the center. The Show house changes its display many times throughout the year and is also used for the conservatory's many flower shows and special events. The perennial gardens are located outside to the north of the vestibule.

=== Lily pond ===
The lily pond is located between the conservatory building and the Belle Isle Aquarium. It was not part of the original design, but constructed in 1936. The rocky walls were created with 200 tons of moss-covered limestone boulders that were brought from the construction of the Livingstone Channel in the Detroit River near Amherstburg, Ontario. The pond is home to Japanese koi that are maintained by volunteers and are held in the aquarium basement during winter.

=== Greenhouses ===
Located to the east of the conservatory building are 20 greenhouse structures. 15 of the structures are used to care for the orchid, bromeliad, cactus, amaryllis and tropical plant collections. Five of the greenhouses are used by the Golightly Career and Technical Center's Agriscience Program for high school students in the metro Detroit area. These greenhouses help train for post-graduation jobs as green's keepers, florists, arborists, nursery owners and related fields. The first greenhouse was built on Belle Isle in 1903.

== Non-profit involvement & volunteerism ==
The Anna Scripps Whitcomb Conservatory is opened to the public free of charge, and operates mostly on the budget designated by local and state Governments. However, Belle Isle has long history of support through private organizations and donors. Volunteerism plays an important role for all of Belle Isle. Specifically, four major volunteer organizations have been vital to the livelihood of the island park. Friends of Belle Isle, a non-profit grassroots environmental organization, was founded in 1972 and is dedicated to the upkeep and preservation of Belle Isle through cleaning and the ridding of invasive species on the island. In 1988, the Belle Isle Botanical Society began raising money for projects to improve the Anna Scripps Whitcomb Conservatory. The Belle Isle Botanical society offered many services to the conservatory including volunteer tour guides and gardeners, and was also involved in raising funds to maintain and support the conservatory operation through repairs, equipment, purchase of plant material, etc. In 2004, the Belle Isle Women's Committee was created and its first project was to upgrade Sunset Point. The non-profit Friends of the Belle Isle Aquarium was formed in 2005 with the goal of restoring Belle Isle's historic aquarium.

In 2009, the four organizations put a plan in action to form a single organization that could pool all their efforts and ideas into a larger and more effective non-profit dedicated to improvement projects. Together, receiving assistance from the Cultural Alliance for Southeastern Michigan and the Michigan Nonprofit Association, they have joined forces to form a single all-volunteer organization named the Belle Isle Conservancy. The Kresge Foundation, based in suburban Detroit, has played a key role in the merger. Kresge gave the four organizations $100,000, in 2009, and in 2010 another $100,000. Currently, there are five employees, one manager and a supervisor from the Michigan Department of Natural Resources that make up the Floriculture Unit at the Belle Isle Conservatory. The staff members are responsible for caring for all the plants in the Conservatory and the surrounding formal gardens. The Conservatory relies on volunteers for all its additional needs and workers.

== Gallery ==
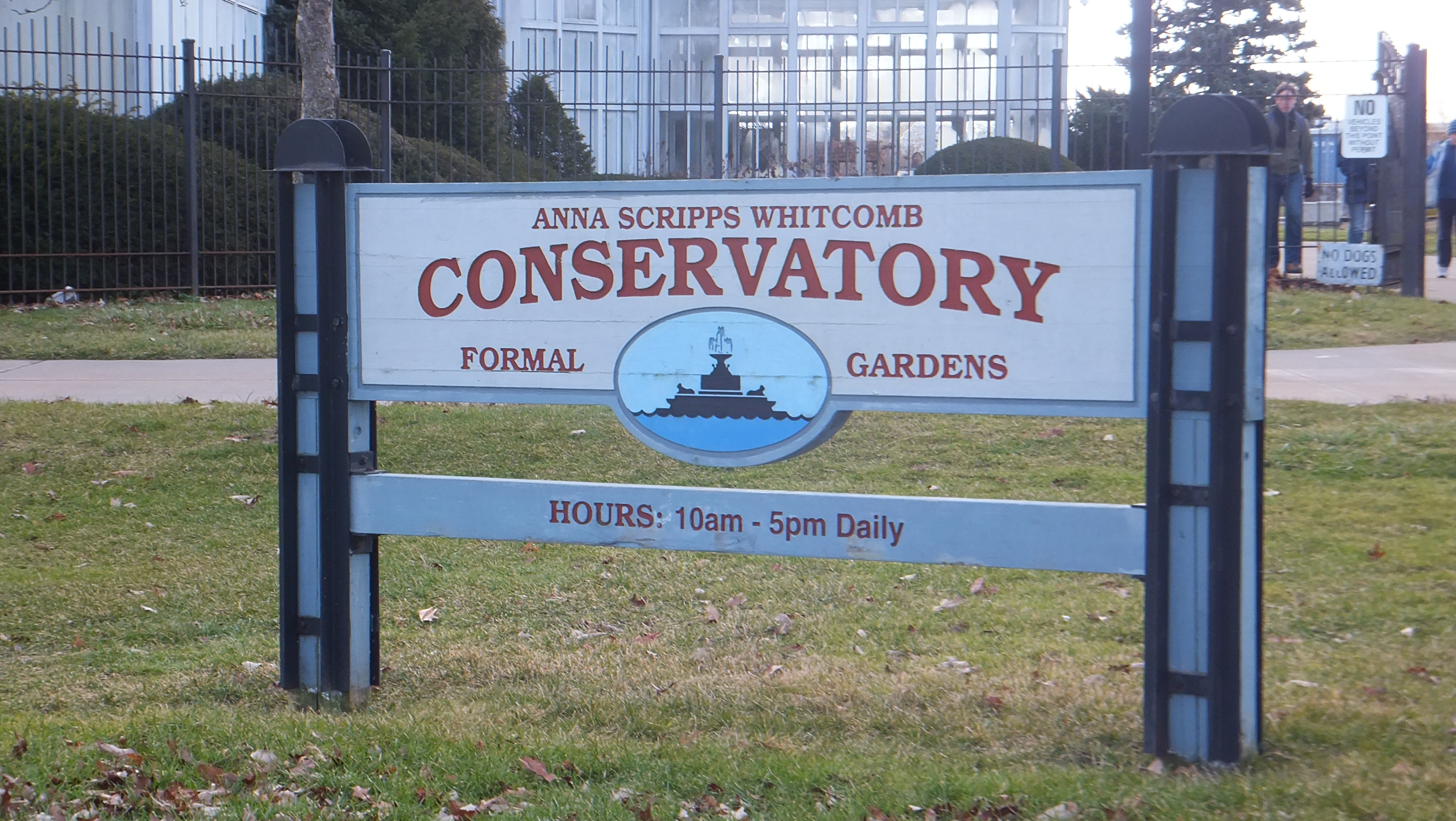
Entrance sign.

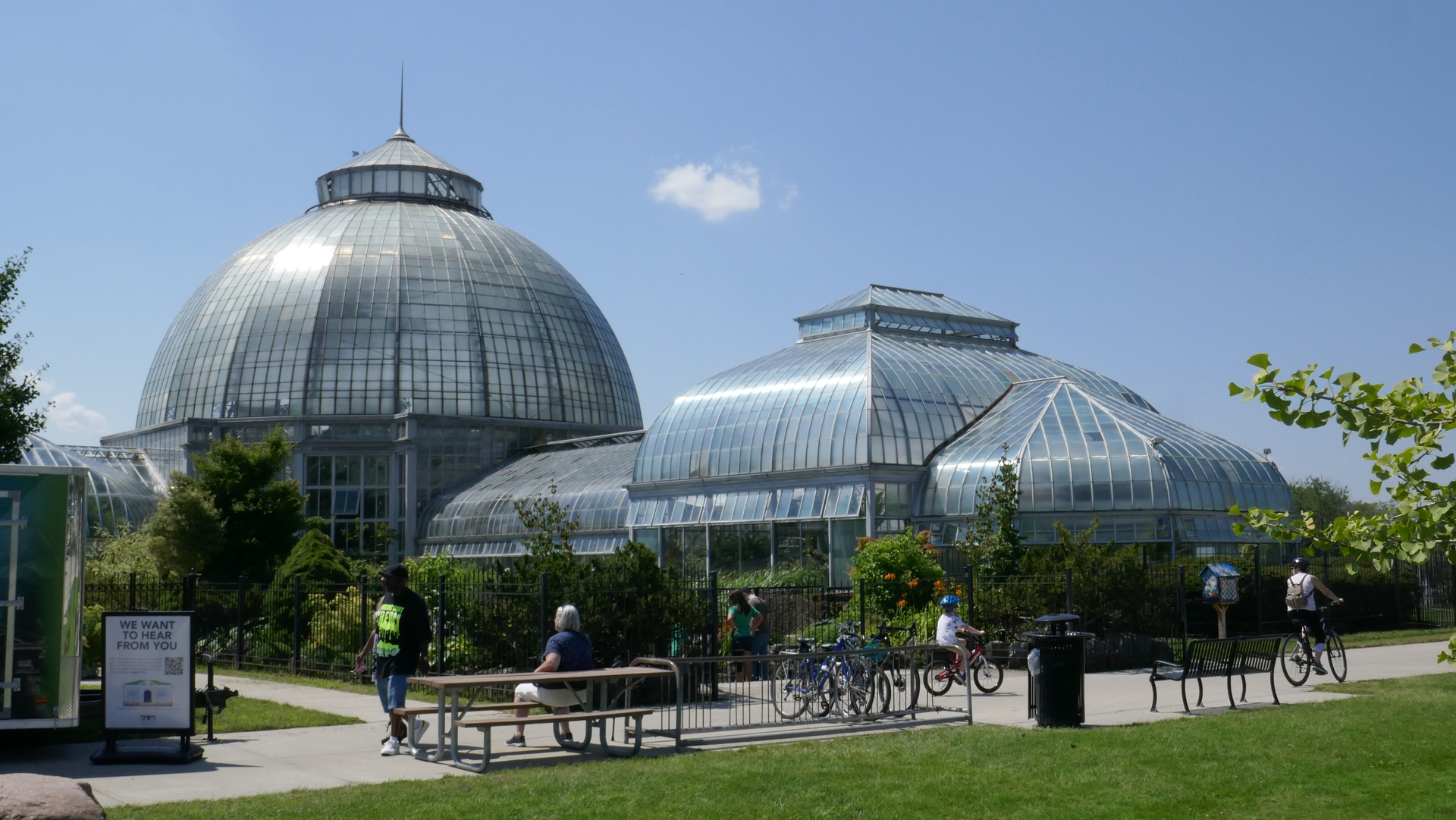
Anna Scripps Whitcomb Conservatory

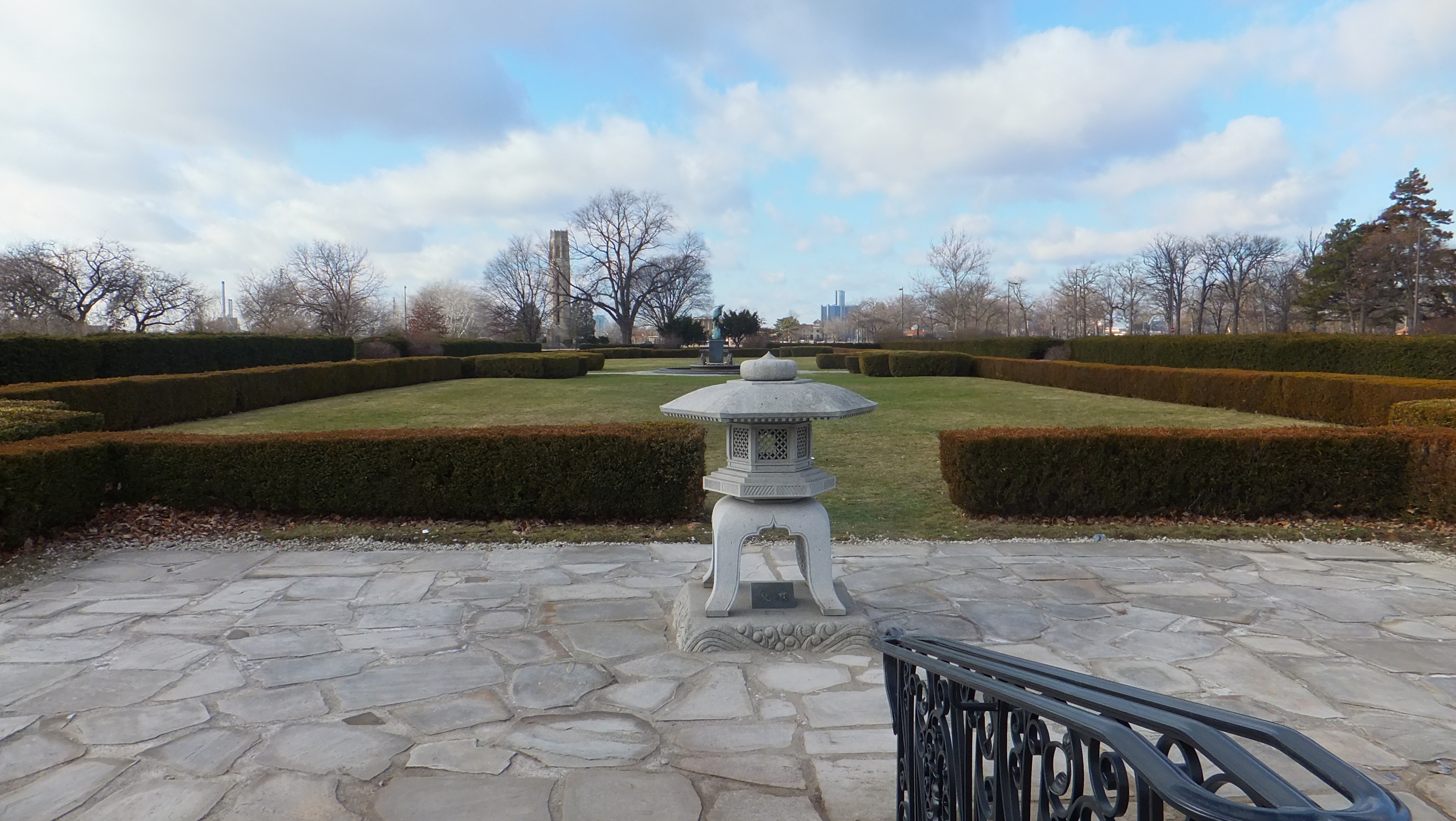
The Henry A. Johnson Memorial Gardens

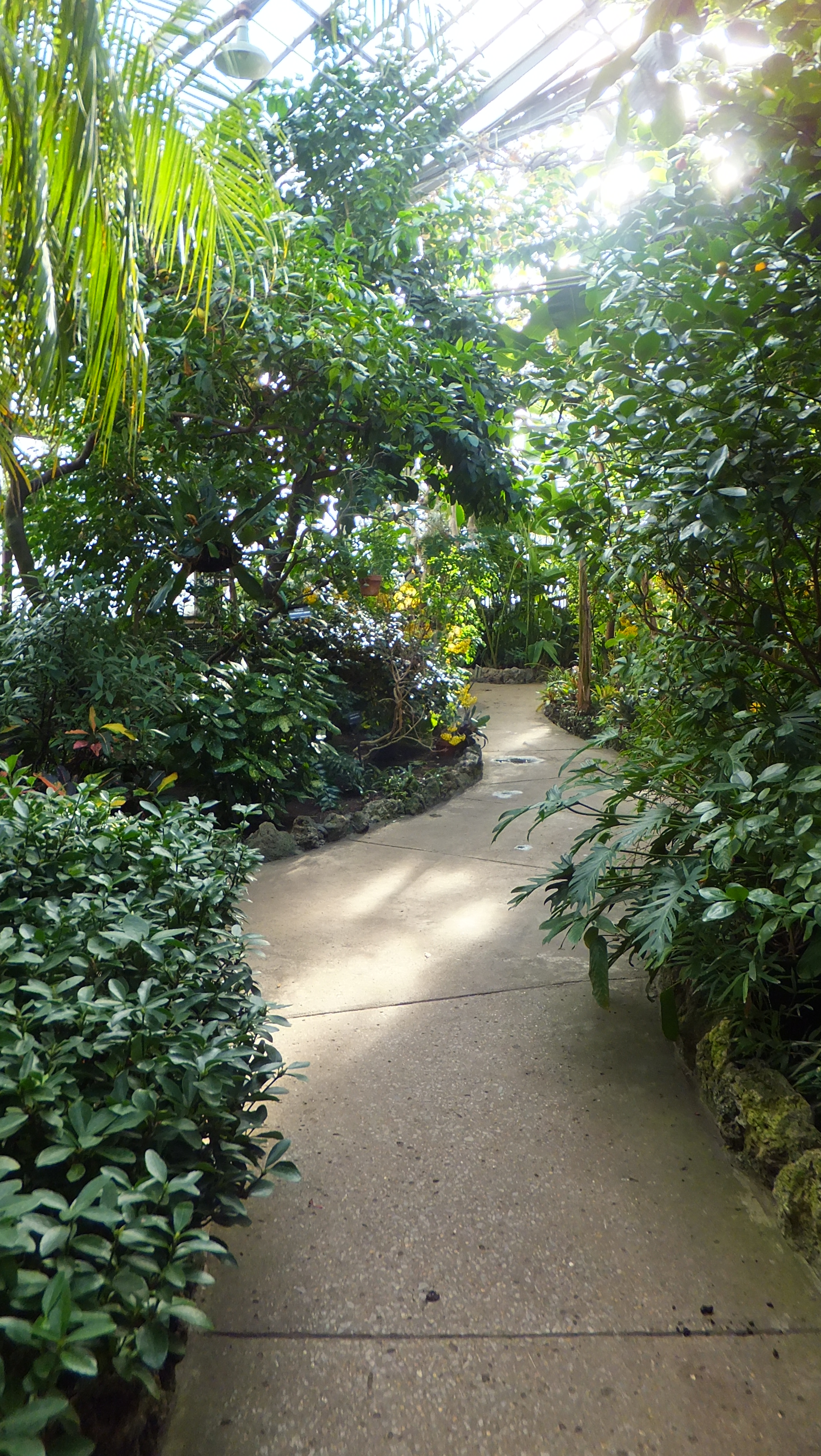
Pathway through the Tropical house

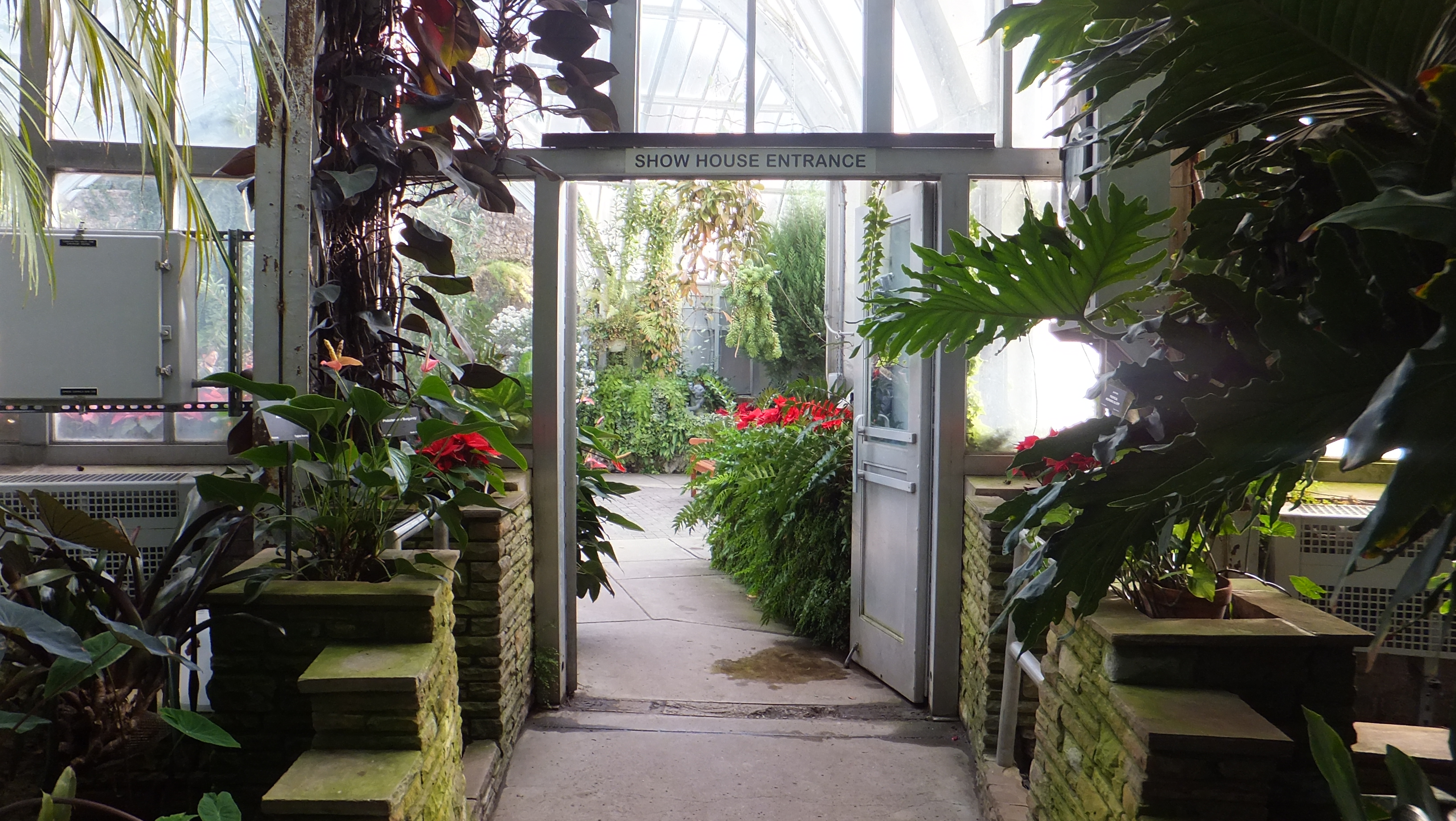
Entrance to the Show house

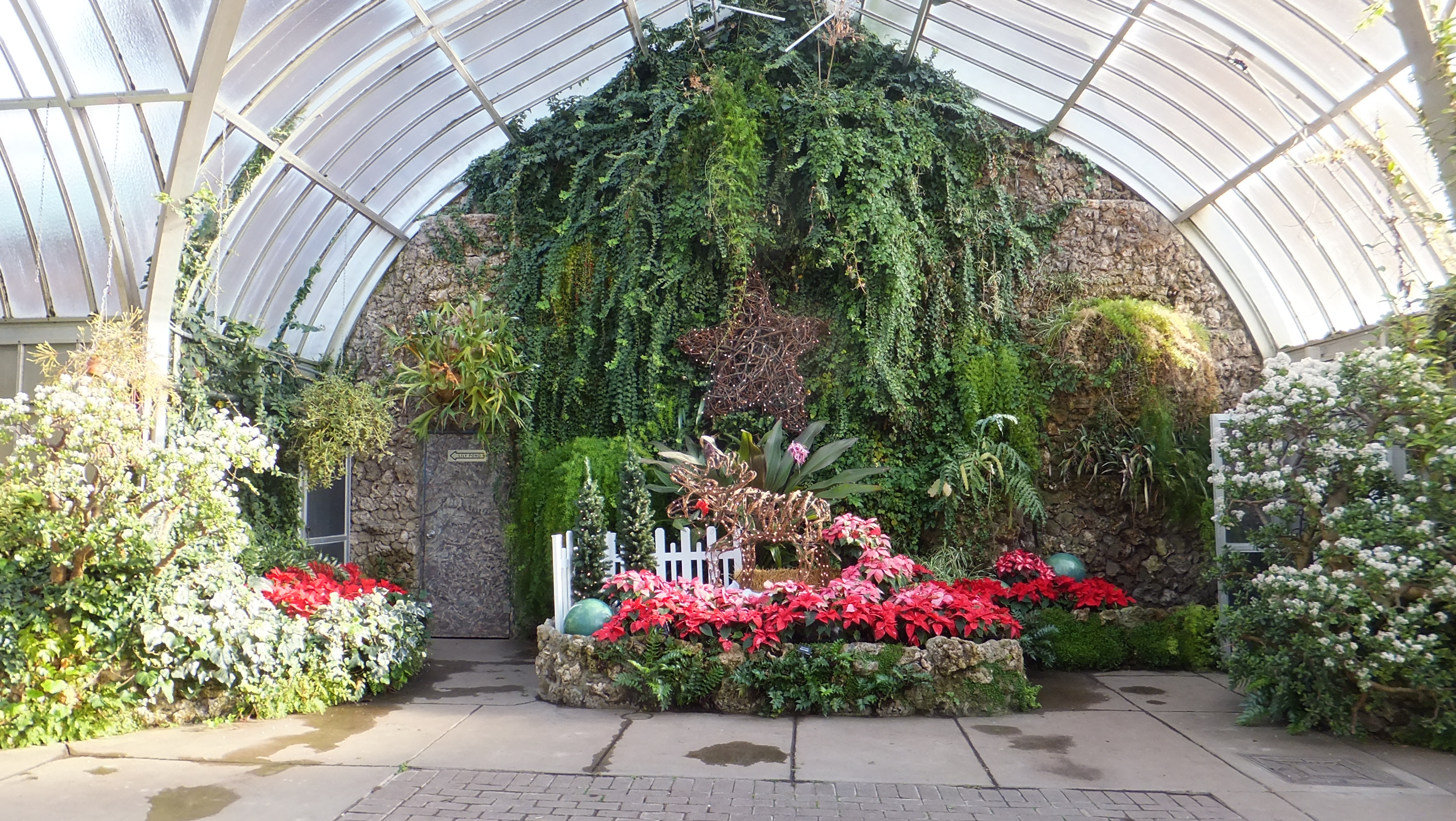
Show house (East Wing)

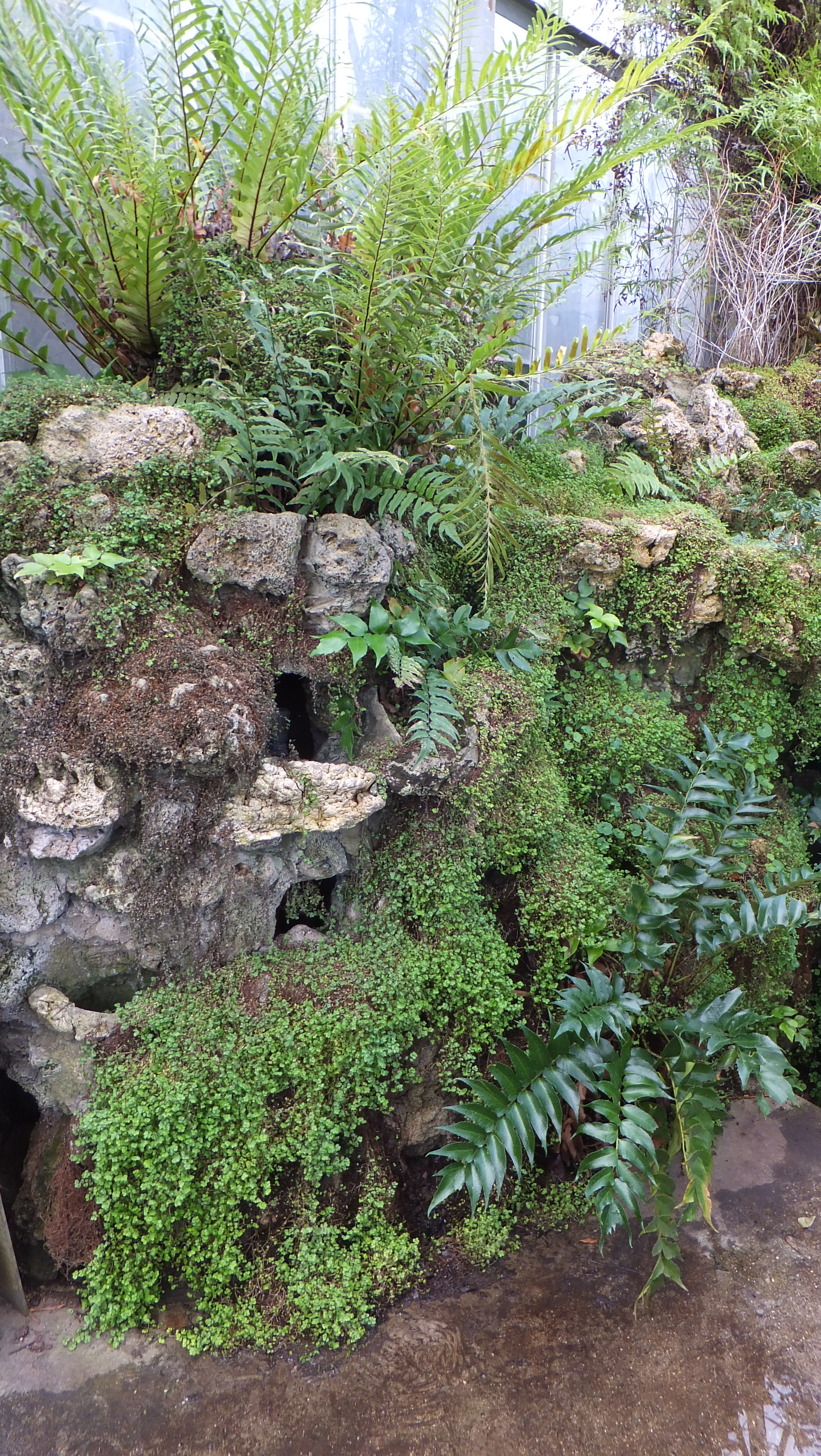
Ferns

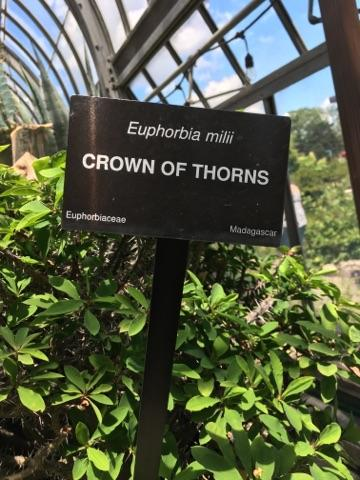
Example of an information plate at the Conservatory

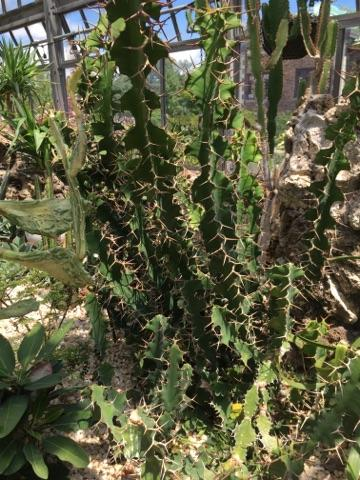
Cactus at the Conservatory

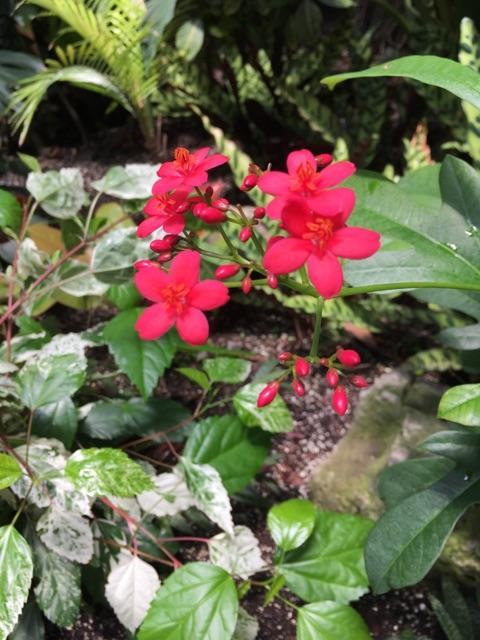
Flowers in the Conservatory
