= Detroit Naval Armory =

- U.S. National Register of Historic Places
- Michigan State Historic Site
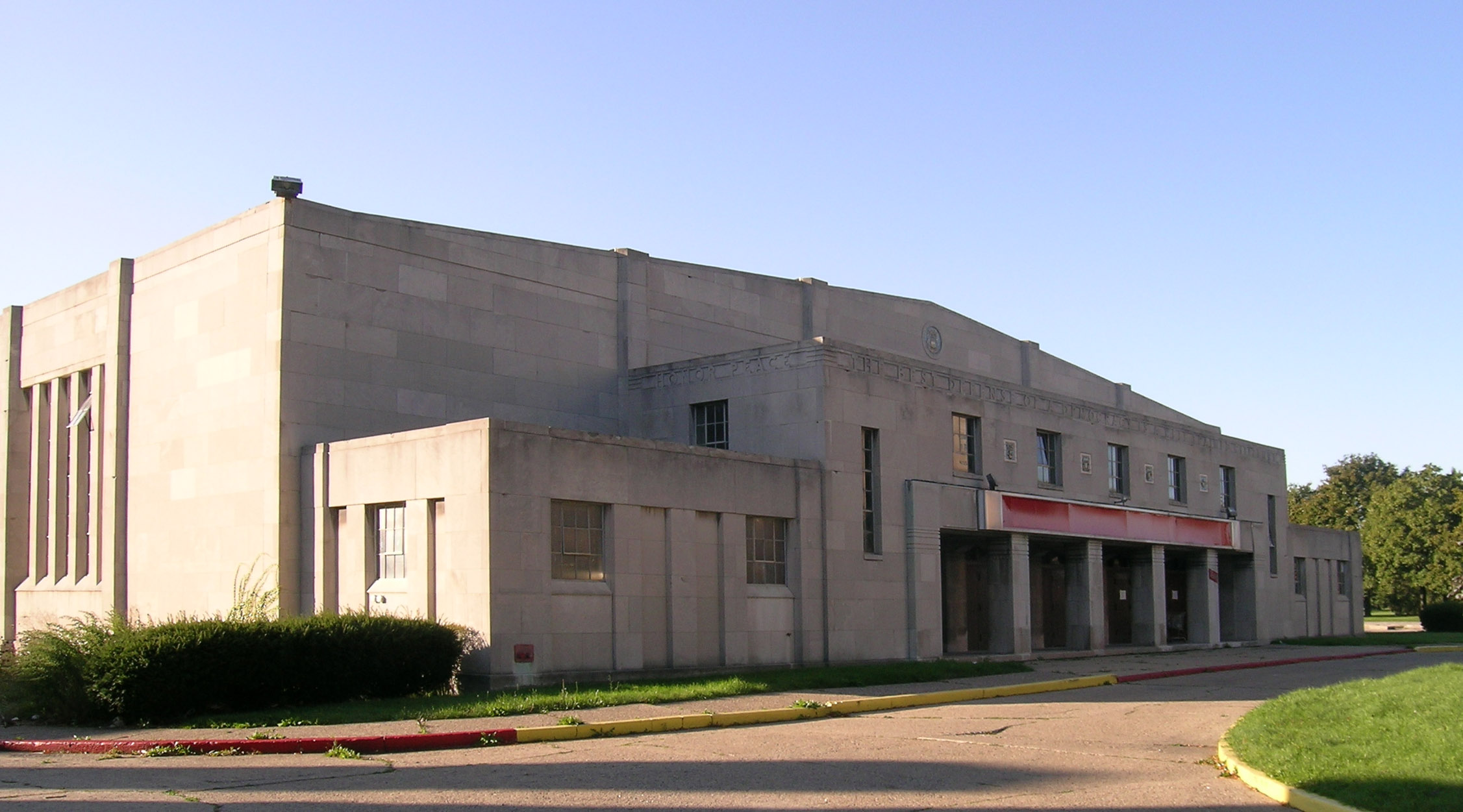
- Interactive map
- Location: 7600 East Jefferson Avenue; Detroit, Michigan
- Coordinates: 42°20′55″N 82°59′51″W
- Built: 1930
- Architect: William Buck Stratton
- Architectural style: Art Deco, Art Moderne
- NRHP reference No.: 94000662

Significant dates
- Added to NRHP: July 1, 1994
- Designated MSHS: October 2, 1980

The Detroit Naval Armory is located at 7600 East Jefferson Avenue in Detroit, Michigan. It is also known as the R. Thornton Brodhead Armory. The armory was designated a Michigan State Historic Site in 1980 and listed on the National Register of Historic Places in 1994.

== Description ==
The Detroit Naval Armory is a limestone structure with four main sections: a vestibule, a drill hall, an office / penthouse section, and a company drill hall. The building mixes Art Moderne and Art Deco influences, and contains a large array of nautically themed WPA art by artists including John Tabaczuk, Edgar Yaeger, David Fredenthal and Gustave Hildebrand. The building faces East Jefferson; the entrance is heavily decorated in military and naval themes using Pewabic tiles. In front of the building is a semi-circular drive encircling a flagpole, unveiled May 26, 1942, in honor of Captain R. Thornton Brodhead and a large Navy anchor from the USS Yantic, a Civil War gunboat whose hull is buried in a filled-in boat slip in Gabriel Richard Park.

== History ==
In the 1880s, several states formed "naval militias", the forerunners of present-day Navy and Marine Corps Reserve units. Michigan formed the Michigan Naval Militia in 1893; the militia quickly became a popular pastime for wealthy Detroiters. Even so, the militia fought in both the Spanish–American War and World War I. By 1929, over 600 men were part of the militia, and it had outgrown its existing headquarters. Captain Richard Thorton Brodhead convinced the Michigan state legislature to construct a new building. The state of Michigan and the city of Detroit pooled $375,000 to build a new armory on Jefferson near the foot of the Belle Isle bridge.

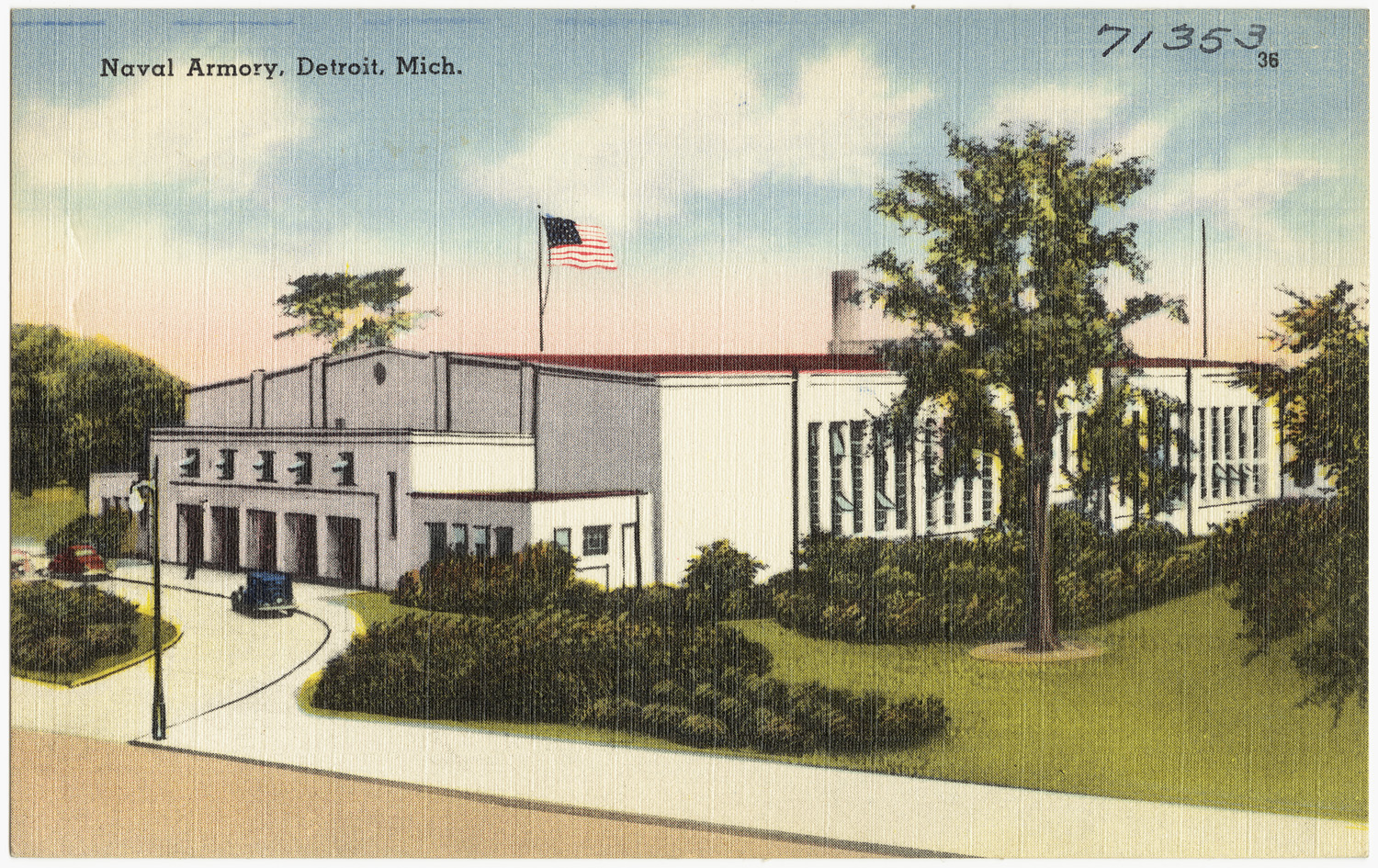
Postcard of the Detroit Naval Armory

The new armory opened in 1930, and was used as both a training facility and civic event site. The indoor drill floor was used for dances, USO mixers, auto shows, and political and sporting events. In 1932, future heavyweight champion Joe Louis fought his first career bout. Between May 1936 and 1939, improvements were made to the facility by the Works Progress Administration, a New Deal agency that provided employment and created public works projects throughout the United States during the Great Depression. The extensive remodeling and expansion project included a basement motorpool and gymnasium; enlargement of the third floor, to add an officer's wardroom, mess hall and kitchen; and a fourth-floor penthouse wing to accommodate visiting officers. In addition to that, the Detroit Naval Armory under the Brodhead Naval Armory name also hosted the Detroit Eagles in the National Basketball League, a precursor league to the National Basketball Association, from 1939 until they left the league in 1941 to become a barnstorming team.

The WPA also funded numerous Federal Art Project contributions to the armory between 1936 and 1941. Captain Brodhead and architect William Stratton accepted a proposal by artist David Fredenthal and reconfigured an entire wall in the wardroom to include bookshelves and a fireplace. Fredenthal and his assistants then created a mural in five panels, in true fresco, depicting the range of experiences on shipboard. He also created a smaller mural in the adjacent bar area. A mural on the four walls of the mess hall was painted by Edgar Yaeger; one of his assistants, John Tabaczuk, carved some 20 insets for wooden doors in the building, as well as a fanciful bannister on the stairway to the penthouse. Gustave Hildebrand, assisted by James Johnson, incised plaster on the four walls at the main east entrance to create 800 feet of bas relief depicting the everyday activities of sailors. This collection of WPA art is the largest collection of federally funded Depression-era artwork of any building in the state; one authority stated that the Detroit Naval Armory contains "the richest WPA art collection of any building in Michigan, with the greatest variety of different media in one collection."

During World War II, the armory was used as a barracks and schoolhouse for Navy diesel and electrical schools. After the war ended, it was again used as a training center for reservists.

The armory was eventually renamed the R. Thornton Brodhead Armory, in memory of its first Naval leader. The armory was home to Marines and Sailors of Headquarters and Service Company, 1st Battalion, 24th Marines until 2004. As of 2008, plans were to refurbish the armory to include bowling, fitness and youth boxing club facilities. In 2021, the City of Detroit sold the armory to The Parade Co., the organization responsible for Detroit's Thanksgiving Day Parade.
