= Pork and beans (disambiguation) =

Pork and beans generally are a culinary dish. The term may also refer to:

- Pork and Beans (plant), the plant Sedum rubrotinctum
- "Pork and Beans" (song), a song by Weezer
- Liberty Square (Miami), a city neighborhood with public housing project locally referred to as Pork & Beans
- Pork And Beans War (1838–1839), a confrontation between the United States and the United Kingdom
