= Mystic Marriage of Saint Catherine (Correggio, Detroit) =

C.1512 painting by Correggio

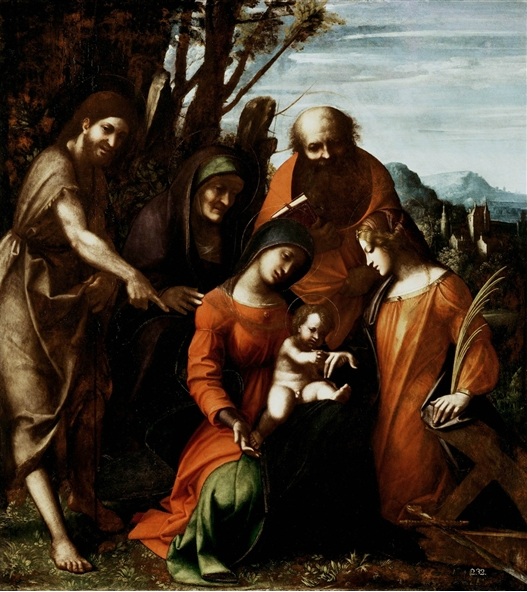

Mystic Marriage of Saint Catherine or Mystic Marriage of Saint Catherine with Three Saints in a Landscape is a c. 1512 oil on panel painting by Correggio, now in the Detroit Institute of Arts. It is usually dated to the artist's youth, before Madonna and Child with St Francis (Dresden) and after Mystic Marriage of Saint Catherine (Washington).

== History ==
The work's dimensions suggest it was originally an altarpiece in Mantua or nearby. It is recorded as one of the Gonzaga Collection works sold to Charles I of England and after Charles' execution it was initially sold to a private collection in London before passing through others in Vienna and Amsterdam. Sir Joseph Duveen bought it in 1925 and took it to the US, selling it to Anna Scripps Whitcomb, who finally donated it to its present home in 1926.
