= Belle Isle Conservancy =

U.S. non-profit organization in Detroit

- Founded: 2011
- Type: 501(c)(3)
- Tax ID no.: 23-7348118
- Location: 99 Pleasure Drive, Detroit, Michigan
- Coordinates: 42.337666879605365°N 82.9994713457069°W
- Region served: Belle Isle
- Members: 600
- Key people: Meagan Elliott, president and CEO
- Revenue: $1.2 million (2013)
- Employees: 6
- Volunteers: 4,500
- Website: belleisleconservancy.org
- Formerly called: Belle Isle Women's Committee, Belle Isle Botanical Society, Friends of Belle Isle, and the Friends of Belle Isle Aquarium

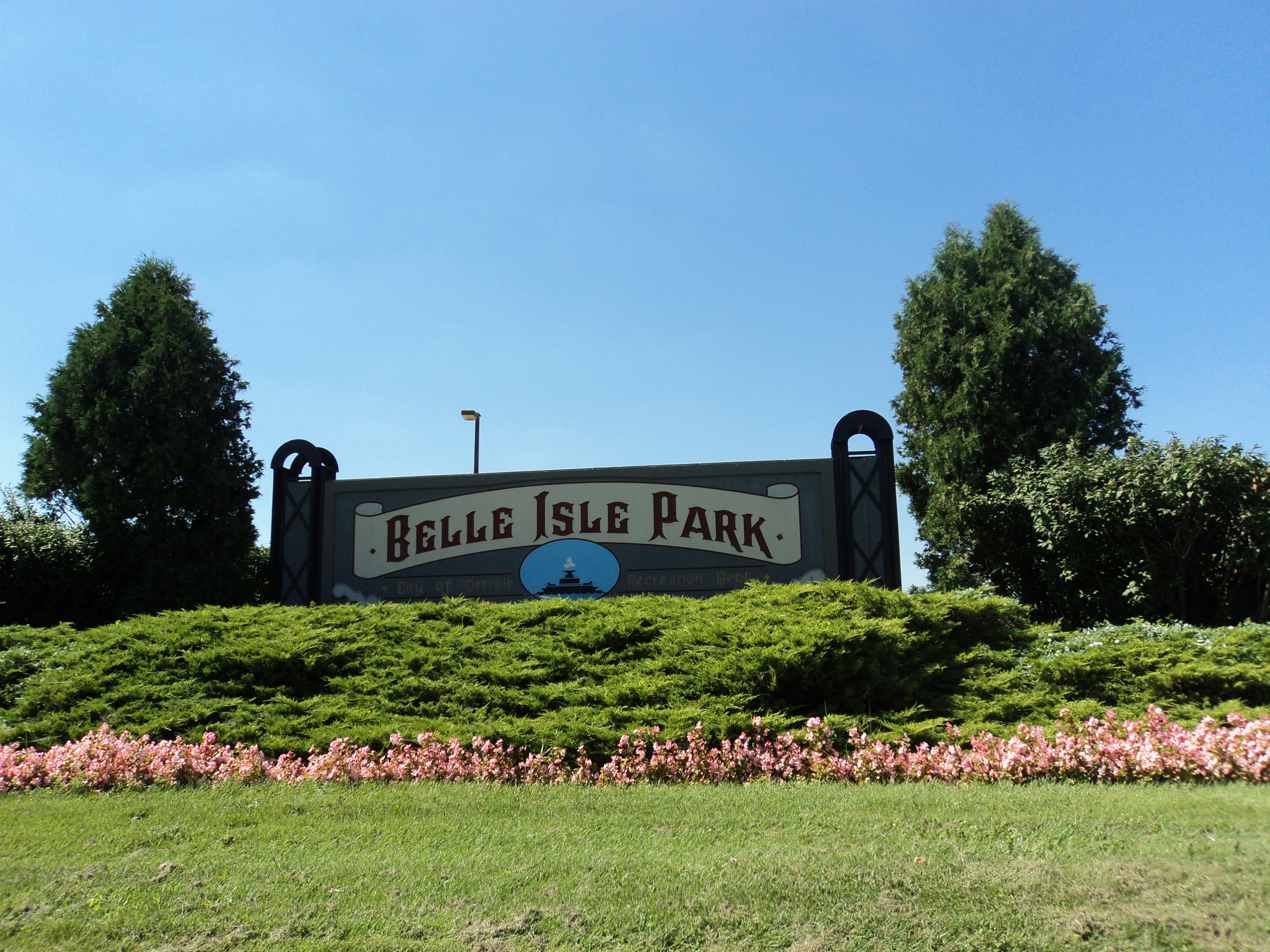
Entrance to Belle Isle

The Belle Isle Conservancy is a 501(c)(3) non-profit organization working to restore, preserve, protect and enhance Detroit's Belle Isle.

== History ==
Four volunteer-based organizations had been largely response for volunteer efforts on Belle Isle. Friends of Belle Isle, a non-profit grassroots environmental organization, was founded in 1972 and was dedicated to the upkeep and preservation of Belle Isle through cleaning and the ridding of invasive species on the island. In 1988, the Belle Isle Botanical Society began raising money for projects to improve the Anna Scripps Whitcomb Conservatory. In 2004, the Belle Isle Women's Committee was created and its first project was to upgrade Sunset Point. The non-profit Friends of the Belle Isle Aquarium was formed in 2005 with the goal of restoring Belle Isles historic 100-year-old aquarium.

In 2009, the four organizations put a plan in action to form a single organization that could pool all their efforts and ideas into a larger and more effective non-profit dedicated to improvement projects. The first stakeholder meetings were held in 2009 to see what advocates wanted for the park. A volunteer driven park user survey was conducted in 2010 – with 2200 respondents. By 2010, planning began for a merger based on feedback from users and advocates, and a desire for stronger leadership. The four organizations voted in January 2011 to proceed with a merger. By the end of 2011, with assistance from the Cultural Alliance for Southeastern Michigan and the Michigan Nonprofit Association, the four organizations had officially merged into the single Belle Isle Conservancy.

== Operations ==
The Conservancy is a 501(c)3 nonprofit organization, governed by a 19-member board of directors, with five members representing the City of Detroit: a seat appointed by the Mayor, one by the City Council, representatives from the Recreation Department and General Services Department, and the manager of Belle Isle in the Recreation Department. The organization operated in 2013 on a $1.2 million budget, including restricted funds, with $700,000 spent annually for park operations, and has 1 full-time and 2 part-time employees. The organization's first president, Michele Hodges, began in January 2013.

== Activities ==
Initially the Conservancy continued the work that was already funded and started by the four founding organizations. In 2012, that represented an investment of nearly $800,000. Those efforts included restoration of the Horse Stables/Maintenance building roof, the Aquarium roof, improvements to the Lake Muskoday habitat, restoration of the Scott Fountain's Pewabic tiles, and improvements to the Anna Scripps Whitcomb Conservatory. The Conservancy assesses major structures and amenities to identify critical and immediate issues to be addressed. Currently the Conservancy focuses on five main areas.

=== Community engagement ===
Through membership and an active volunteer program, the Conservancy coordinates the efforts of thousands of individuals to help maintain and improve Belle Isle.

=== Fundraising for capital projects ===
The organization plans to launch a capital campaign to fund specific capital improvement projects.

=== Marketing ===
The Conservancy is working to become a source of information about Belle Isle, such as its history, current events and attractions, picnic shelter rentals and other amenities, and volunteer opportunities.

=== Park maintenance and operations ===
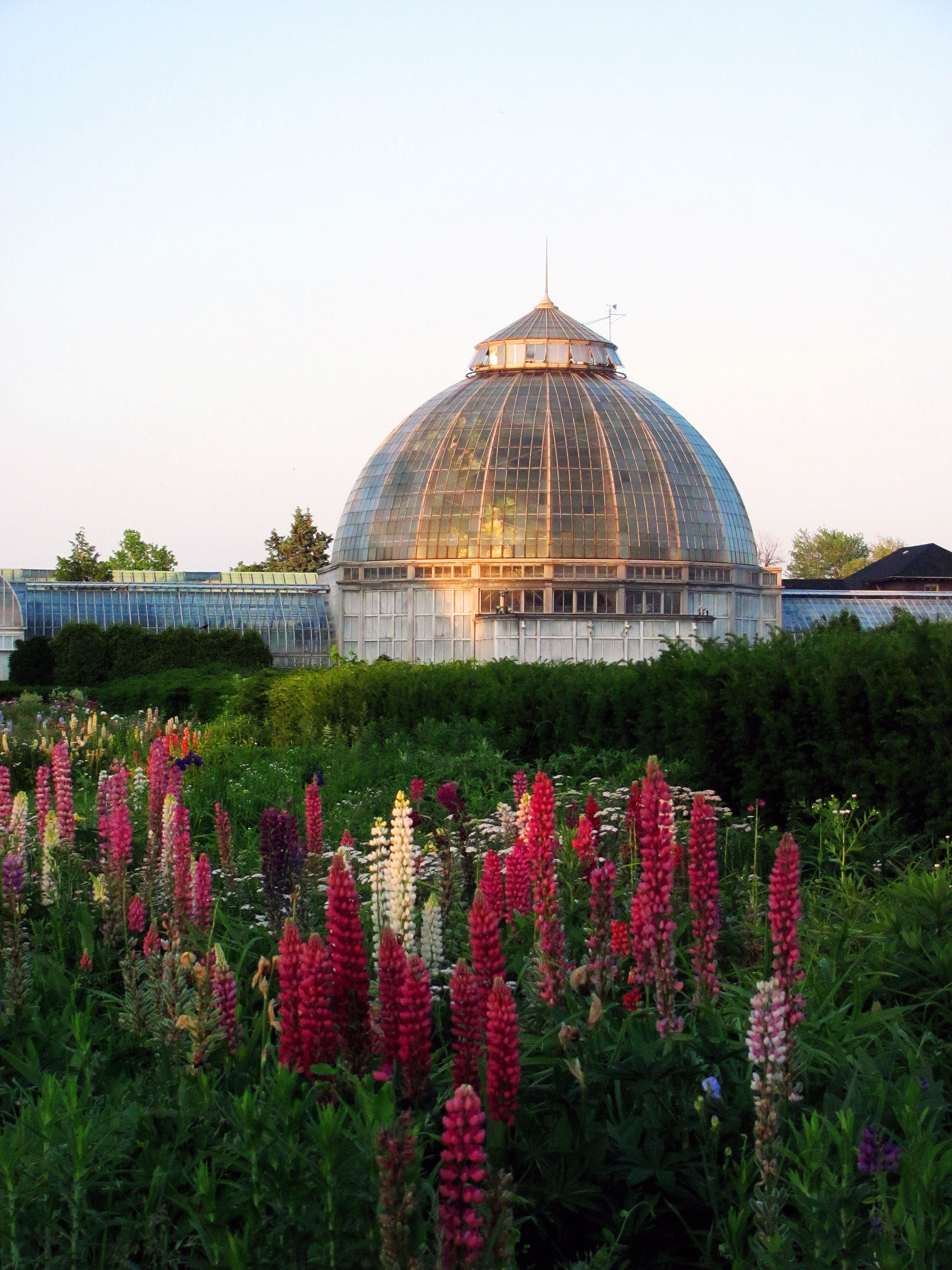
Belle Isle Conservatory

The Conservancy will continue and expand the work started by the four founding organizations. This includes improvement to the Anna Scripps Whitcomb Conservatory, renovation of Sunset Point, the use of the Aquarium for public events, annual events, and habitat restoration.

=== Research and planning ===
The organization will assess the condition of park buildings, facilities, the forest, canals and waterways, attractions and amenities, public sculpture and fountains, and other park features to determine options and priorities for improvements, maintenance and operations.

== Politics ==
The Conservancy endorsed a plan that would lease Belle Isle to the state for 30 years and transition Belle Isle to a state park, which occurred in 2014. The organization made its endorsement after meeting with city and state officials.

== See also ==
- Belle Isle State Park (Michigan)
- Belle Isle Conservatory
