= Edgar Yaeger =

American painter

Edgar Louis Yaeger (1904–1997) was an American modernist painter from Detroit, Michigan.

Yaeger studied under Robert A. Herzberg at the Detroit School of Fine and Applied Arts, by which he was awarded the Founder's Society Purchase Prize. Subsequently, with the backing of the Anna Scripps Whitcomb Traveling Scholarship, Yaeger embarked on a study tour of eight European countries, from France to Czechoslovakia.

Yaeger was best known for his contributions to the Michigan Federal Art project and the Works Progress Administration scheme during the Depression era, to which he contributed a number of murals that were displayed in public buildings. Some of his contributions are located at the West Quad Dormitory at the University of Michigan and the Detroit Public Lighting Commission Building.

== Collections ==
- Smithsonian Institution, Archives of American Art
- Detroit Institute of Arts Museum
- Art Gallery of Windsor
