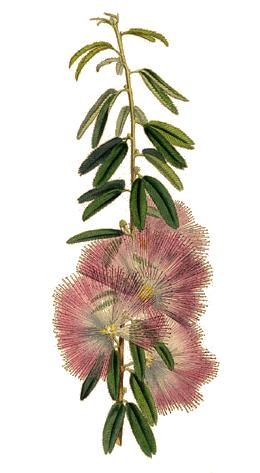

Scientific classification
- Kingdom: Plantae
- Clade: Tracheophytes
- Clade: Angiosperms
- Clade: Eudicots
- Clade: Rosids
- Order: Fabales
- Family: Fabaceae
- Subfamily: Caesalpinioideae
- Clade: Mimosoid clade
- Genus: Calliandra
- Species: C. brevipes

Binomial name
- Calliandra brevipes Benth.

Synonyms
- Acacia selloi Spreng.; Anneslia brevipes (Benth.) Lindm.; Calliandra selloi (Spreng.) J.F.Macbr.; Calliandra yucunensis N.F.Mattos; Feuilleea brevipes Kuntze

= Calliandra brevipes =

Species of legume

Calliandra brevipes, the pink powderpuff, is an attractive shrub with finely divided leaves and clusters of red powder-puff flowers. It is native to southeastern Brazil, Uruguay, and northern Argentina.

Portuguese common names include: Esponja, Esponjinha, Manduruvá, Quebra-foice. Botanical synonyms include Acacia selloi Spreng. and Calliandra selloi Macbr.

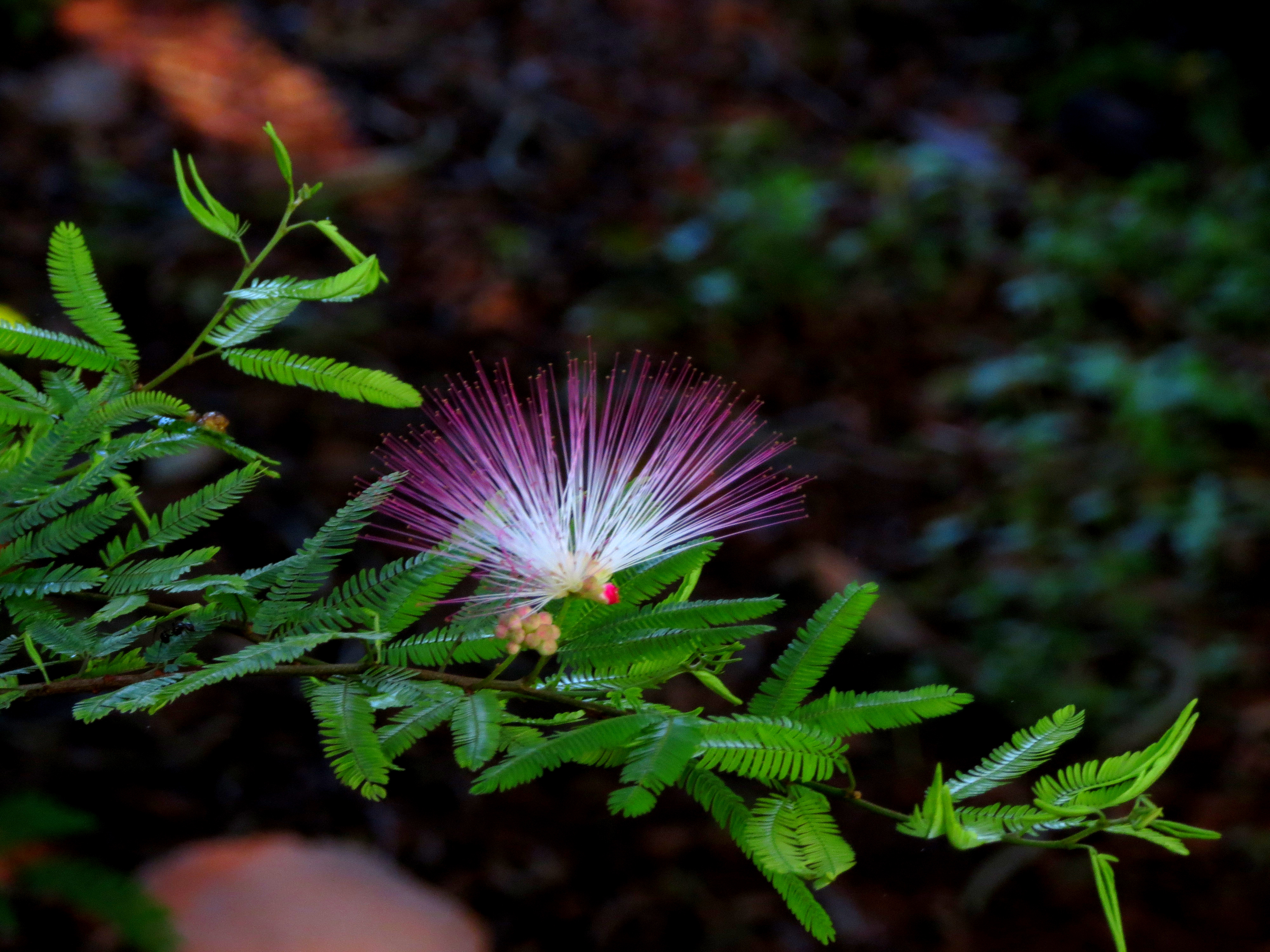
Flower seen in Hebbal lake park, Bengaluru

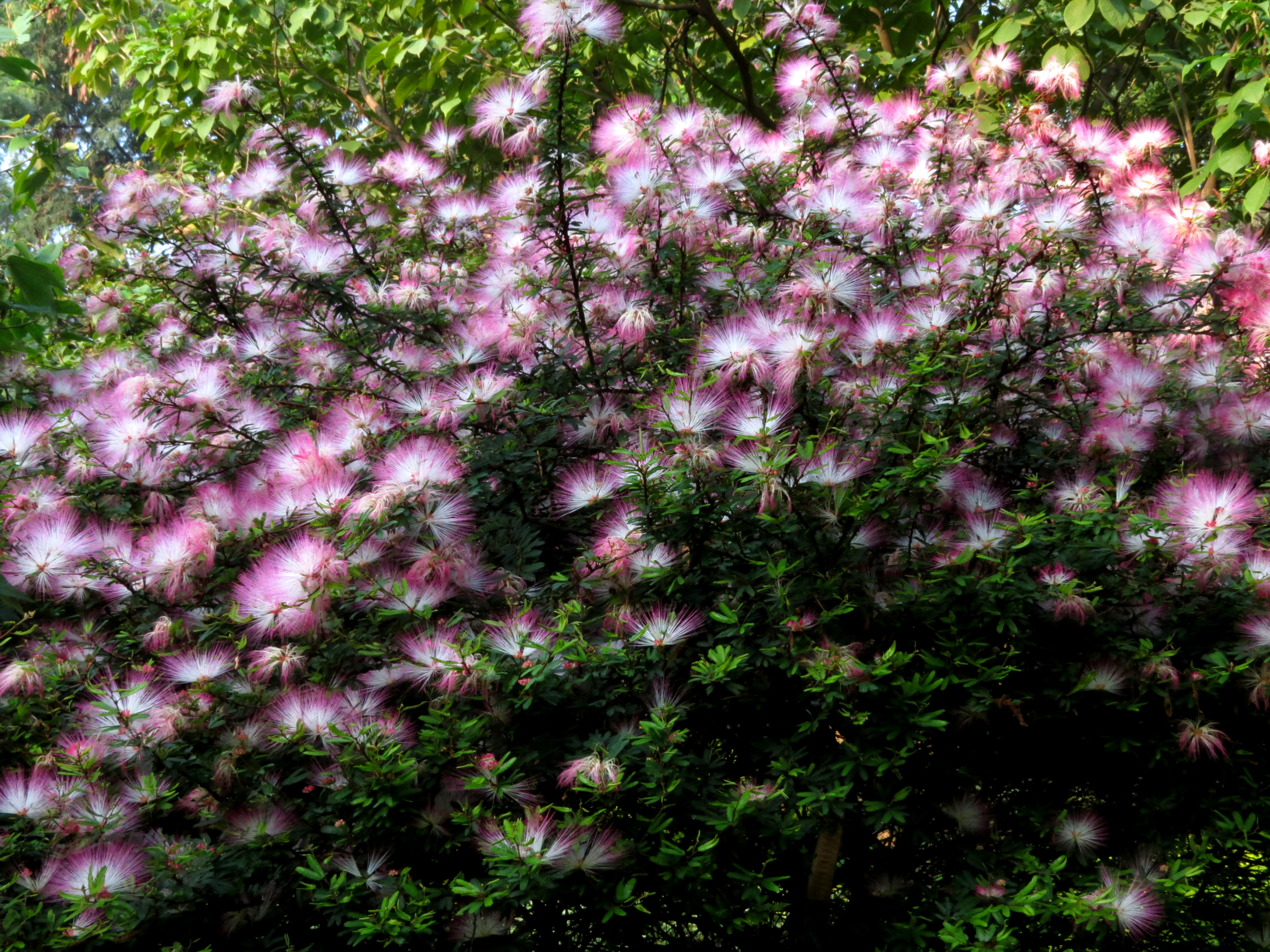
Bunch of Flowers seen in Hebbal lake park, Bengaluru. It emanates mild and pleasant smell
