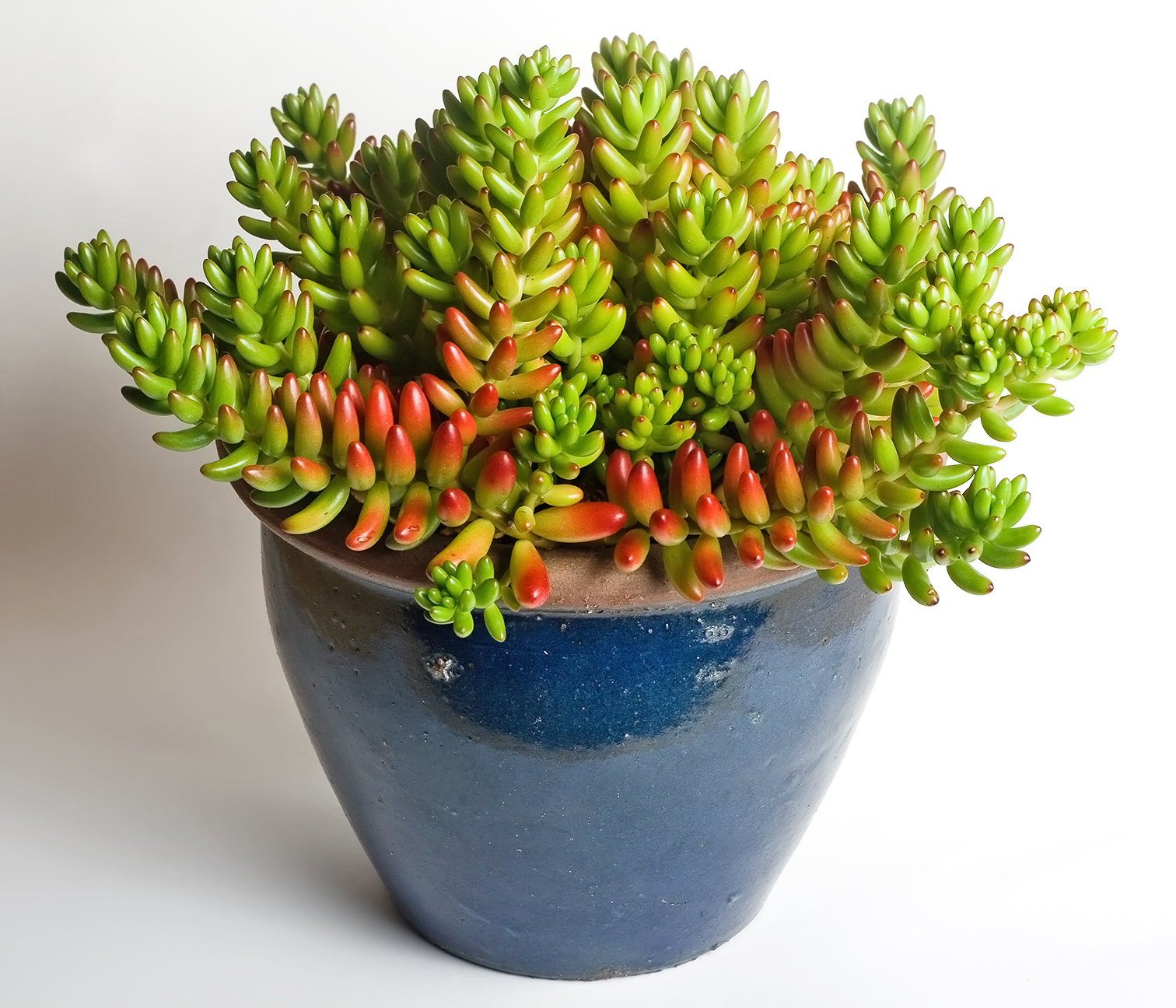

Scientific classification
- Kingdom: Plantae
- Clade: Tracheophytes
- Clade: Angiosperms
- Clade: Eudicots
- Order: Saxifragales
- Family: Crassulaceae
- Genus: Sedum
- Species: S. rubrotinctum

Binomial name
- Sedum rubrotinctum R.T.Clausen

= Sedum rubrotinctum =

Jelly-beans

Species of succulent

Sedum rubrotinctum or Sedum × rubrotinctum, commonly known as jelly-beans, jelly bean plant, or pork and beans, is a species of Sedum from the plant family Crassulaceae. It is a succulent plant originating in Mexico. The common English name refers to its short leaves that resemble jelly beans, especially when taking on a protective hue.

== Description ==
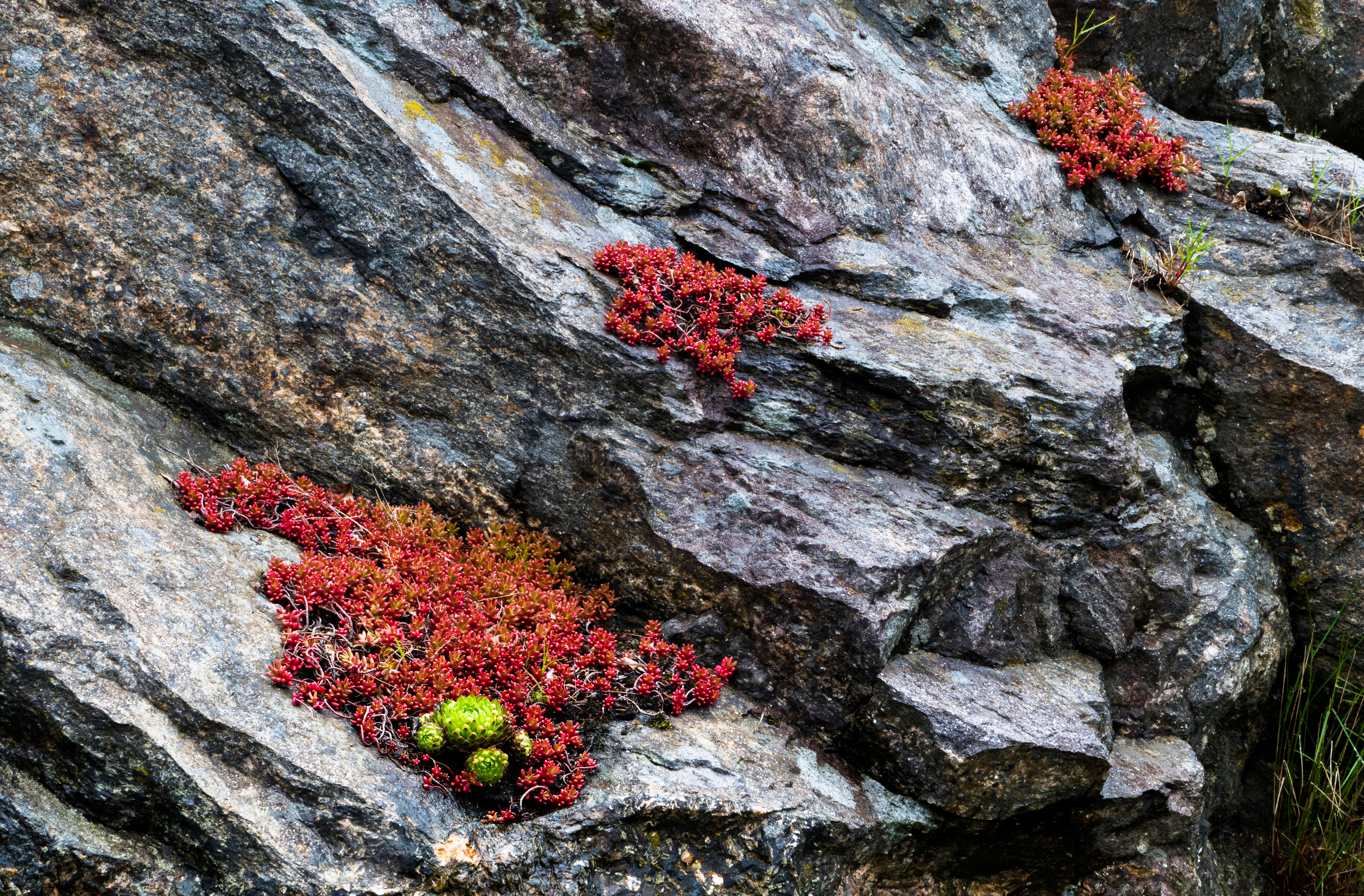
On granite cliff

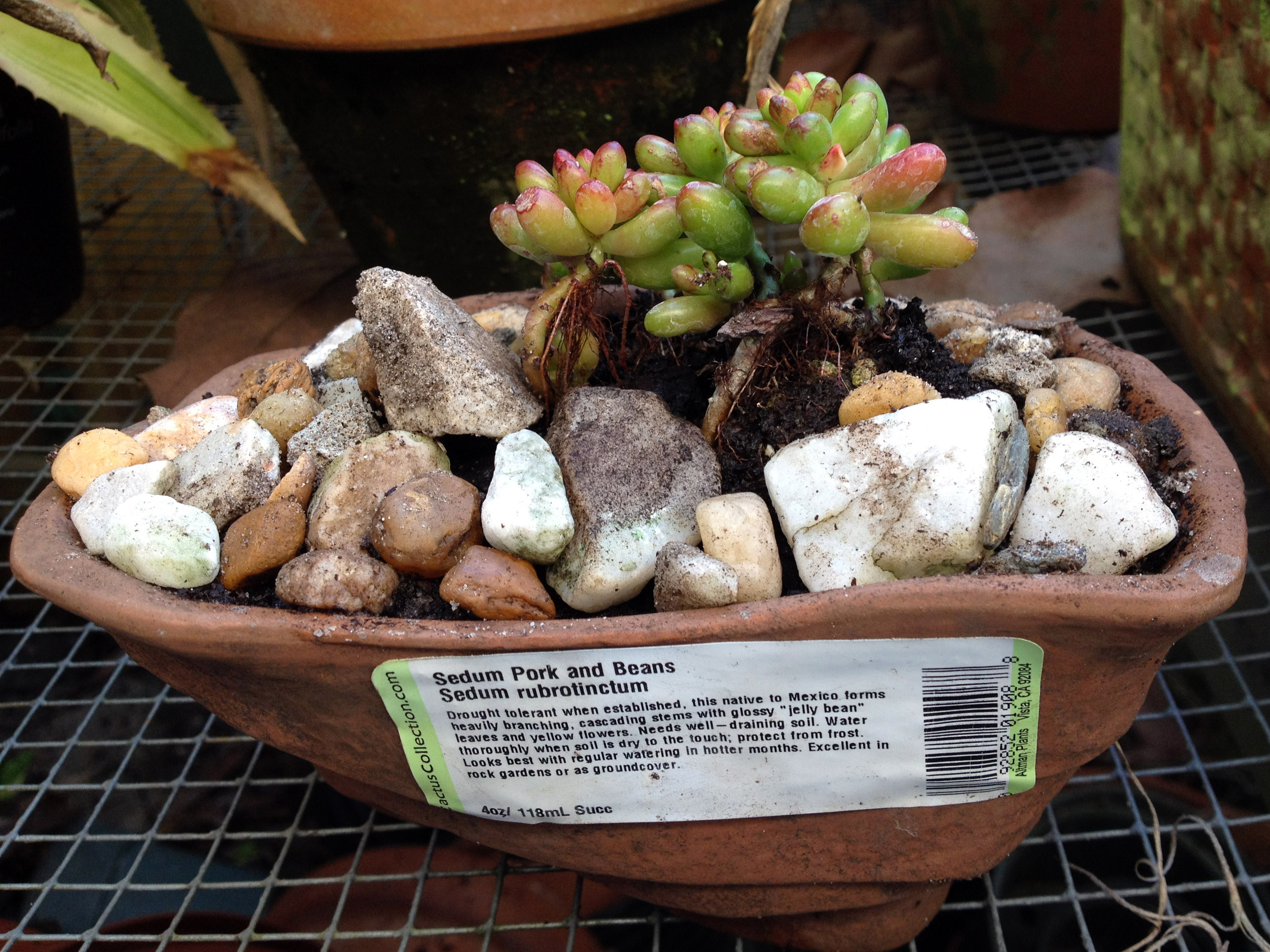

The leaves of Sedum rubrotinctum change colour from green to red during the summer months as a protective adaptation. The plant sprouts bright yellow flowers from between the leaves in mid-spring.

== Taxonomy ==
The species was first described in 1948. It is considered to be an artificial hybrid between Sedum pachyphyllum and Sedum stahlii.

== Cultivation ==
Sedum rubrotinctum is cultivated as an ornamental plant, for planting in gardens and as potted plants. It is grown very easily and tolerates all types of soil except for those that are poorly drained. It grows very well in summer, can take variations in climate, although it is not frost-tolerant.

New plants may be grown from leaves (or beans) that drop off or are separated from the stem and laid on soil.

This plant has won the Royal Horticultural Society's Award of Garden Merit.

Sedum rubrotinctum is poisonous and may cause irritation when ingested or touched.
