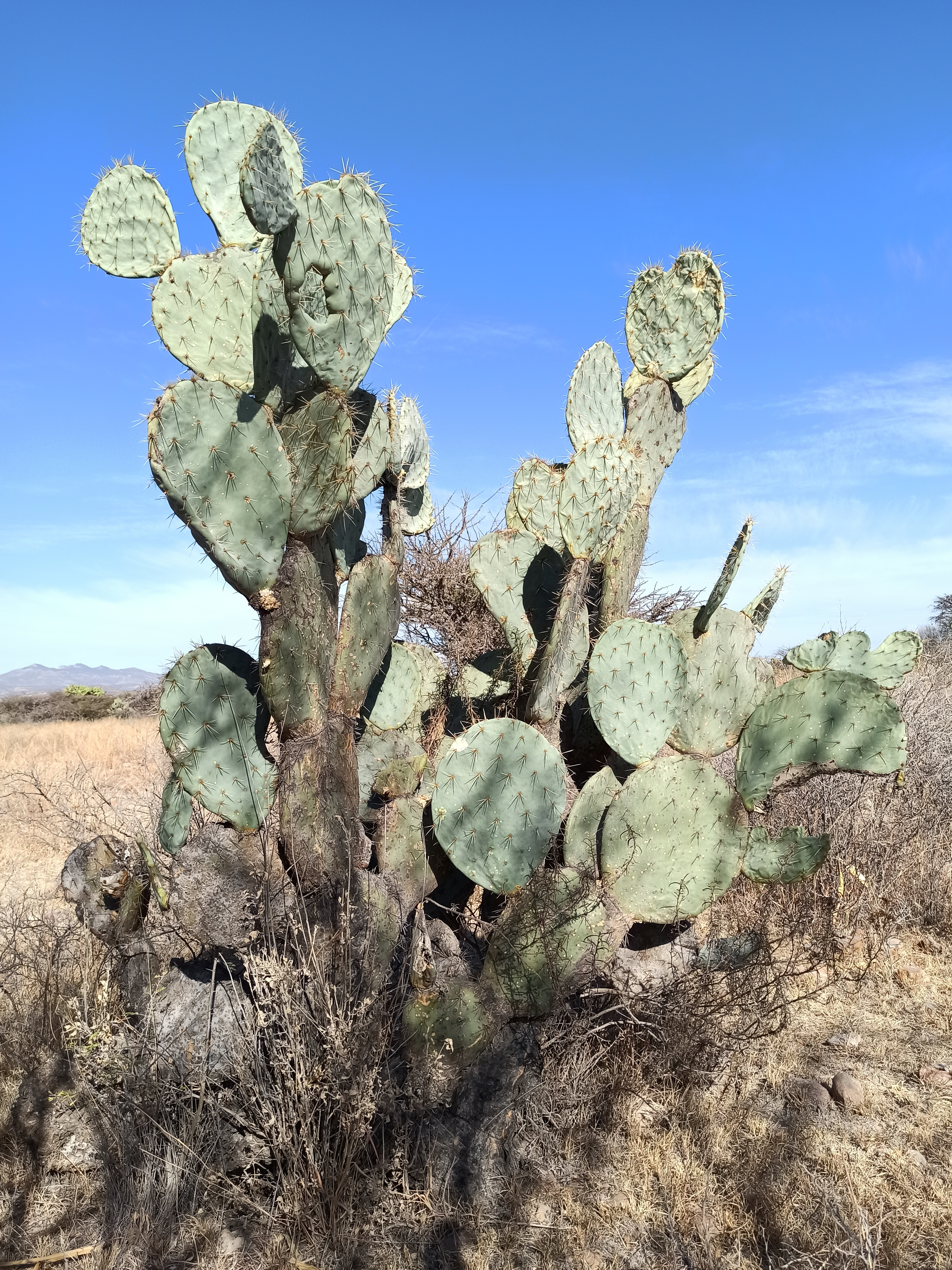
- Opuntia robusta growth form.

Conservation status
- Least Concern (IUCN 3.1)

Scientific classification
- Kingdom: Plantae
- Clade: Tracheophytes
- Clade: Angiosperms
- Clade: Eudicots
- Order: Caryophyllales
- Family: Cactaceae
- Genus: Opuntia
- Species: O. robusta

Binomial name
- Opuntia robusta J.C.Wendl. ex Pfeiff.

= Opuntia robusta =

Species of cactus

Opuntia robusta, the wheel cactus, nopal tapon, or camuesa, is a species of cactus in the family Cactaceae. It is native and endemic to central and northern Mexico to within 100 miles (160 km) of the Arizona and New Mexico borders where it grow from 5,000 to 10,000 feet (1,500 to 3,000 m) on rocky slopes, open shrub lands, woodlands and mixed with other cactus and succulents.

== Description ==
Plants are commonly around 1 m (40 in) high, though they may grow to over 3 m (10 ft) high when supported.

The flattened stem segments are fleshy, round and blue-grey in colour. These are up to 30 cm (1 ft) in diameter and have the length of sharp spines up to 5 cm (2 in). Yellow, sessile flowers with a fleshy base are produced on the edges of the upper stem segments. These are followed by barrel-shaped fleshy fruits which are pink or purple and up to 8 cm (3 in) long.

Opuntia robusta has populations that are dioecious, hermaphrodite, or trioecious (containing male, female, and hermaphrodite individuals).

== Taxonomy ==
The species was first formally described in 1837 in Enumeratio Diagnostica Cactearum hucusque Cognitarum. It has naturalised in the states of South Australia, New South Wales, Queensland and Victoria in Australia.

== Images ==
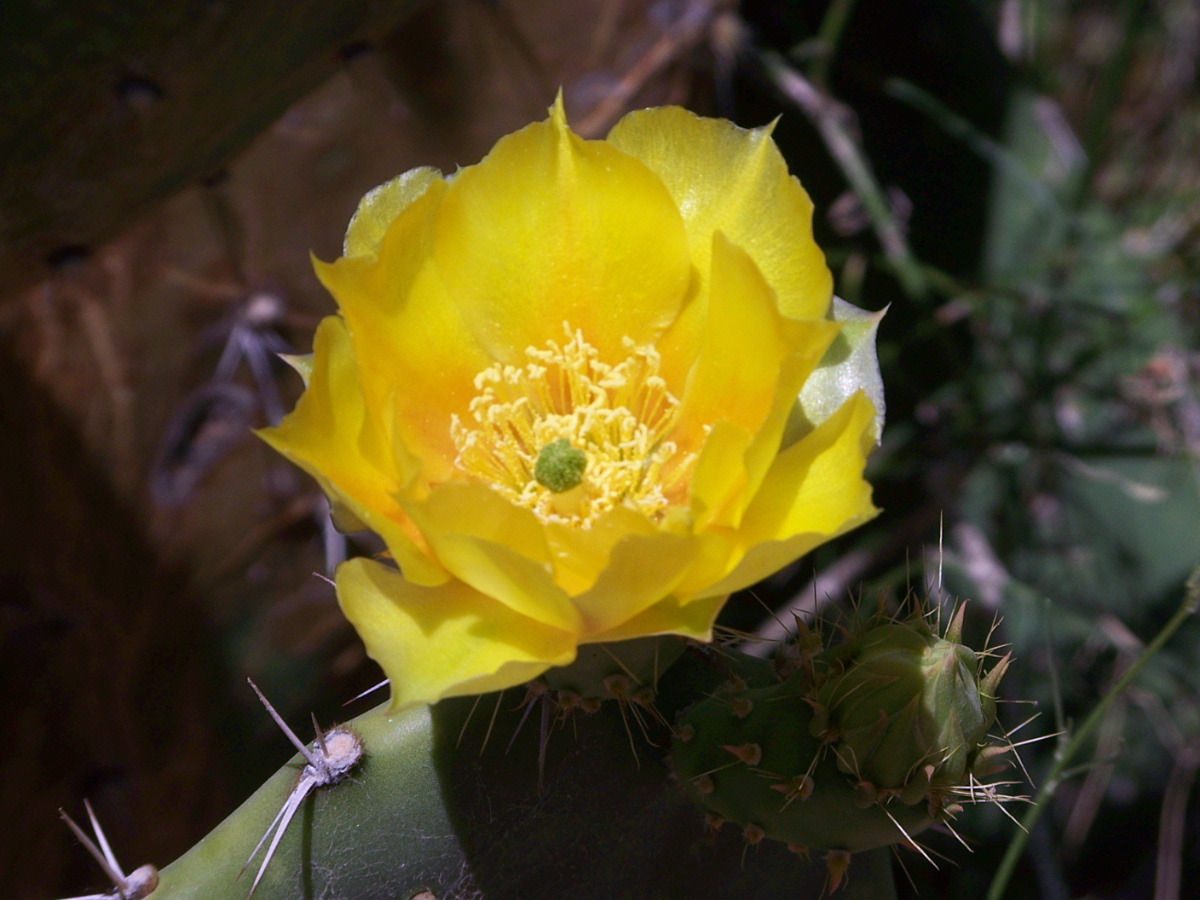
Opuntia robusta flower.

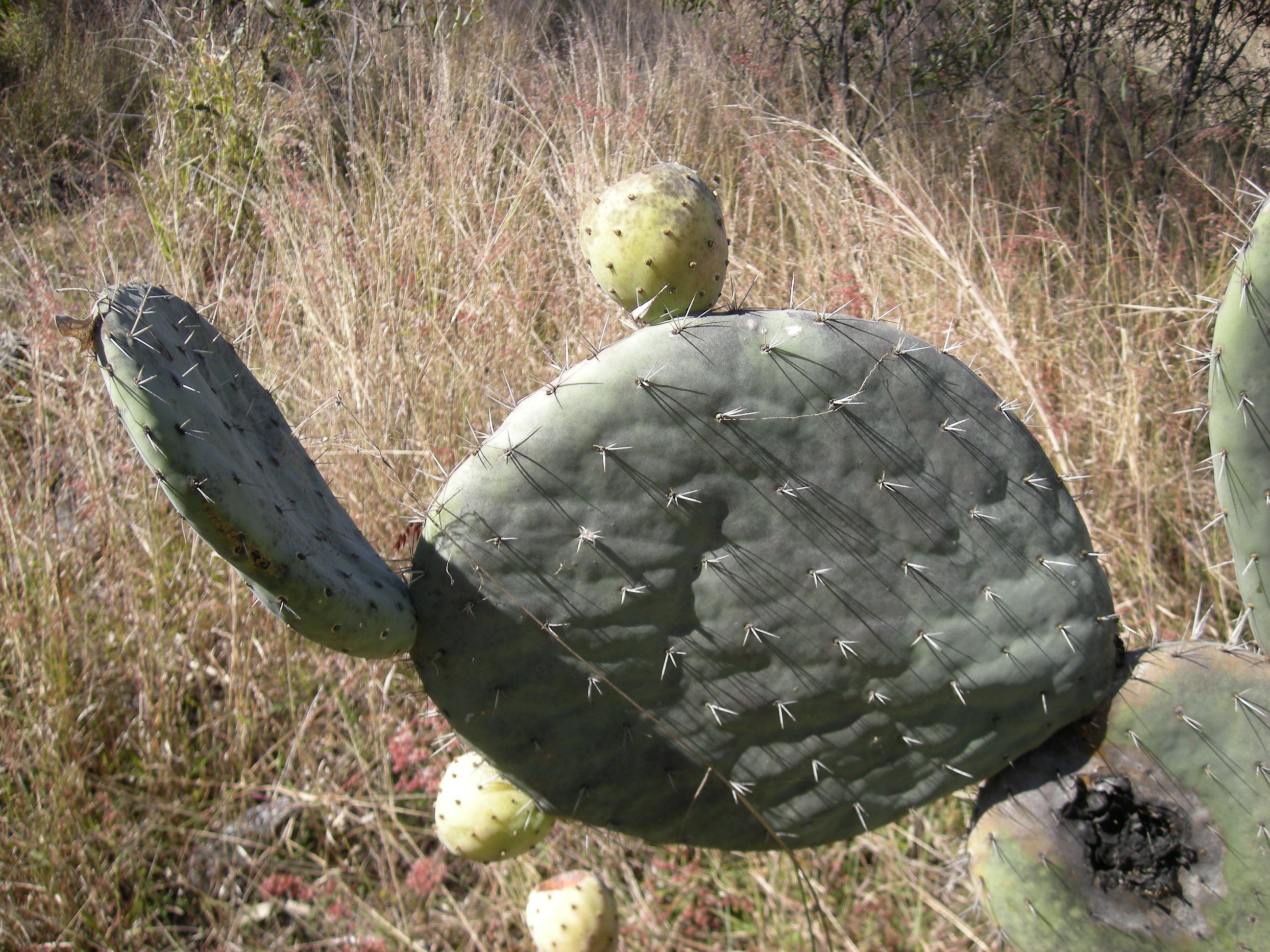
Opuntia robusta stem segment and immature fruit.
