= Belle Isle Aquarium =

Aquarium in Detroit

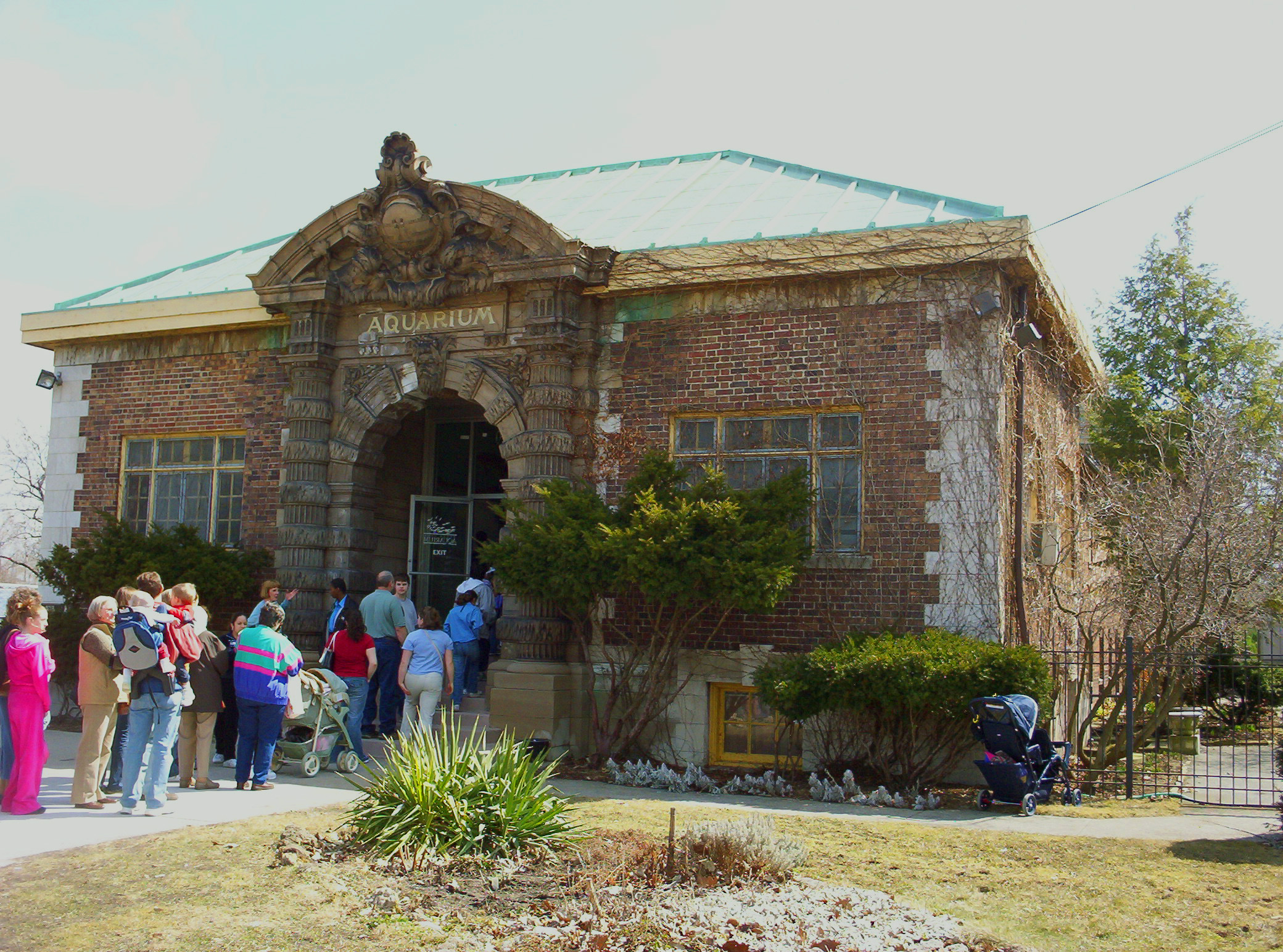
- Belle Isle Aquarium in 2005.
- Interactive map of Belle Isle Aquarium
- 42°20′11.79″N 82°59′7.27″W
- Date opened: August 18, 1904; August 18, 2012 (reopened)
- Location: 3 Inselruhe Avenue; Belle Isle Park; Detroit, Michigan
- Floor space: 10,000 sq ft (930 m^{2})
- No. of animals: 1500 (2005)
- No. of species: 146 (2005)
- Total volume of tanks: 32,000 US gal (120,000 L; 27,000 imp gal)
- Annual visitors: 113,000 (1995), 56,000 (2004)
- Website: www.belleisleconservancy.org

The Belle Isle Aquarium is a public aquarium located in Belle Isle Park in Detroit, Michigan. Designed by noted architects George D. Mason and Albert Kahn, it opened on August 18, 1904, and was the oldest continually operating public aquarium in North America when it closed on April 3, 2005. The aquarium was operated by the Detroit Zoological Society prior to the 2005 closure.

The aquarium reopened to the public on August 18, 2012, and is now run entirely by Belle Isle Conservancy, a 501(c)3 non-profit partner to Belle Isle park. The 10,000-square-foot (930 m^{2}) historic building features a single large gallery with an arched ceiling covered in green glass tile to evoke an underwater feeling.

== History ==
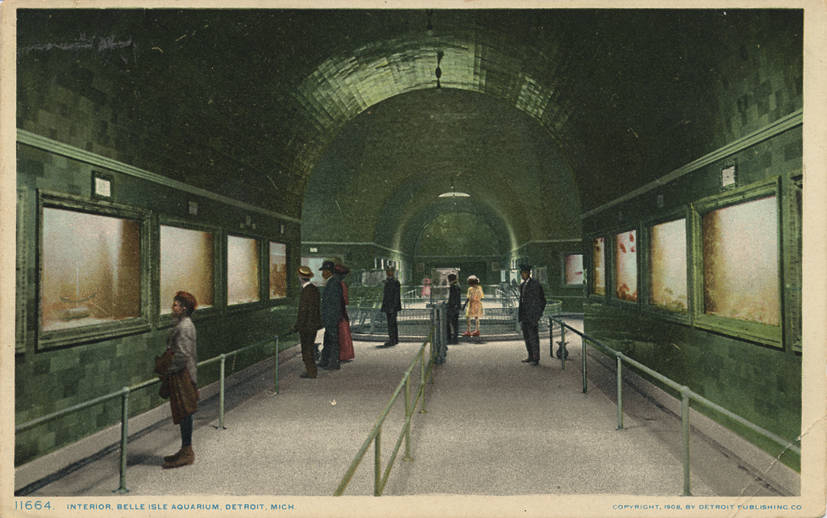
Inside view of the aquarium, 1908

The Belle Isle Aquarium opened on 18 August 1904. According to the address given at the opening ceremony, when it opened it was the third largest aquarium in the world. When it opened it held a total of 65,007 US gallons (246,080 L) of water.

The aquarium basement served as a speakeasy during Prohibition and later held large fish which no longer fit the Belle Isle Zoo's gallery tanks. Closed circuit television allowed remote viewing of these fish. The aquarium was slightly remodeled in the 1950s.

Attendance was on a declining trend in the final decade of its first run: 113,000 visitors toured the aquarium in 1995, but only 56,000 in 2004.

On 14 January 2005, the city of Detroit announced that the aquarium would be closed to save $530,000 annually, with the staff being reassigned to the Detroit Zoo or the Belle Isle Zoo, and the fish transferred to other aquariums. It was originally scheduled to close on March 1. Although an extension was granted to the Friends of Belle Isle Aquarium to come up with a fund raising plan, the aquarium was closed on April 3, 2005.

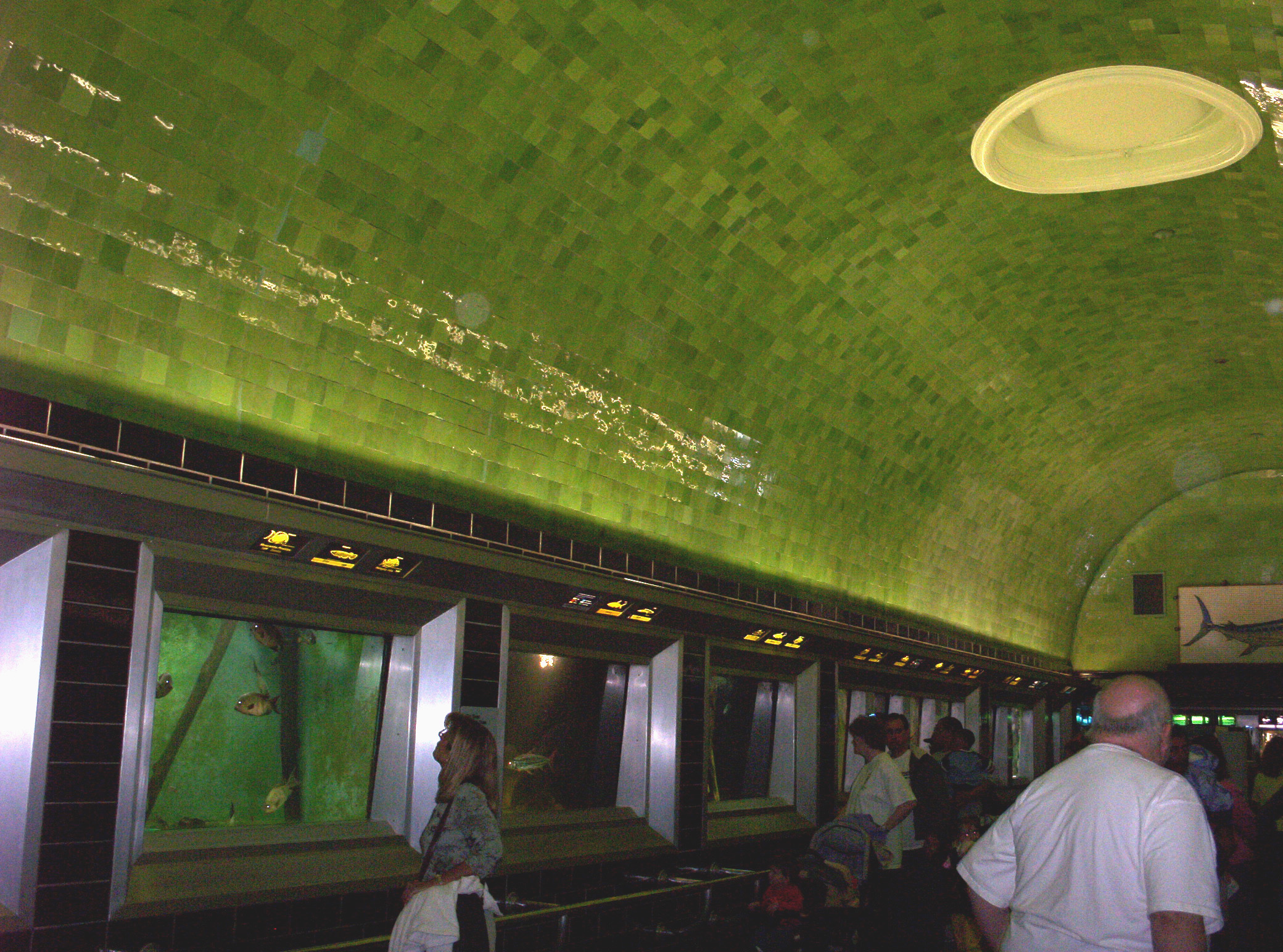
Interior of the aquarium, with its single green-tile curved ceiling gallery

On August 3, 2005, Detroit citizens voted to reopen the aquarium by an overwhelming margin (88% in favor, 12% opposed). However, the vote was non-binding and the aquarium remained closed. In 2010, supporters of the aquarium were still trying to find donors to help defray the building's operating costs.

Although the building was closed between 2005 and 2012, goldfish and koi from an outside pond were housed in the aquarium during the winter. Each year in February, the aquarium opened for a day for the annual "Shiver on the River," a fund raising event to promote public support of Belle Isle non-profit groups including the Friends of Belle Isle Aquarium.

On 14 August 2012, The Belle Isle Conservancy, a non-profit volunteer group established in 2011 from the merger of the Friends of Belle Isle Aquarium and other Belle Isle non-profit groups, announced the re-opening of the aquarium on a limited basis. The aquarium was reopened on 18 August 2012, the 108th anniversary of its opening. The Aquarium now operates with free public admission, welcoming visitors Friday-Sunday from 10am - 4pm, thanks to community funding and the efforts of Belle Isle Conservancy.

== Animals ==
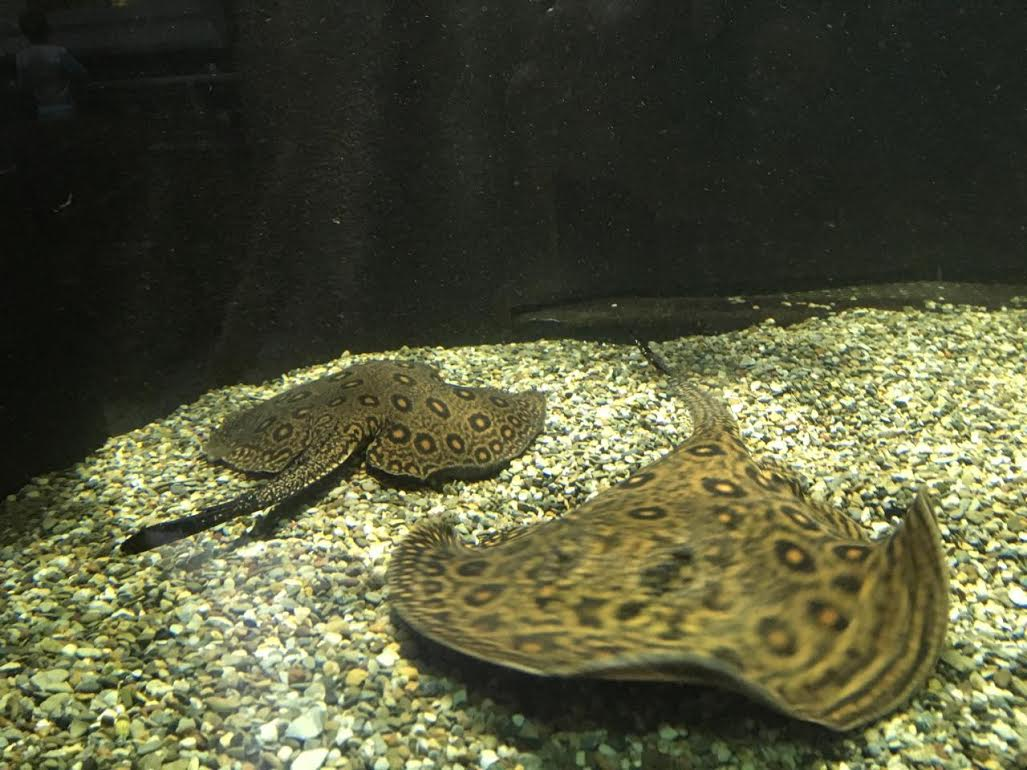
Two rays at the Belle Isle Aquarium

In 2005, the aquarium had 60 exhibits with a total tank volume of 32,000 U.S. gallons (120,000 L; 27,000 imp gal), and was home to over 1,500 fish of 146 species. The aquarium largely featured freshwater species native to the Great Lakes region, but also had salt-water species from around the world. Currently the aquarium over 200 species of aquatic animals.

The aquarium made news in 2002 when one of its female white-spotted bamboo sharks gave birth to two young despite not having been near a male in six years, in a suspected rare case of parthenogenesis.

== Conservation ==
There are several species at the Aquarium that are critically endangered or extinct in the wild. The Belle Isle Aquarium offers various education programs focused on water and environmental conservation that serve both students and educators from the elementary to university levels. The Aquarium has a formal partnership with the Michigan Department of Natural Resources to assist with repopulating sturgeon in the Detroit River. Additionally, Aquarium staff administers frog and mudpuppy studies on the island which help indicate the health of its ecosystems. The Keep Belle Isle Beautiful anti-litter initiative also launches from the Aquarium.
