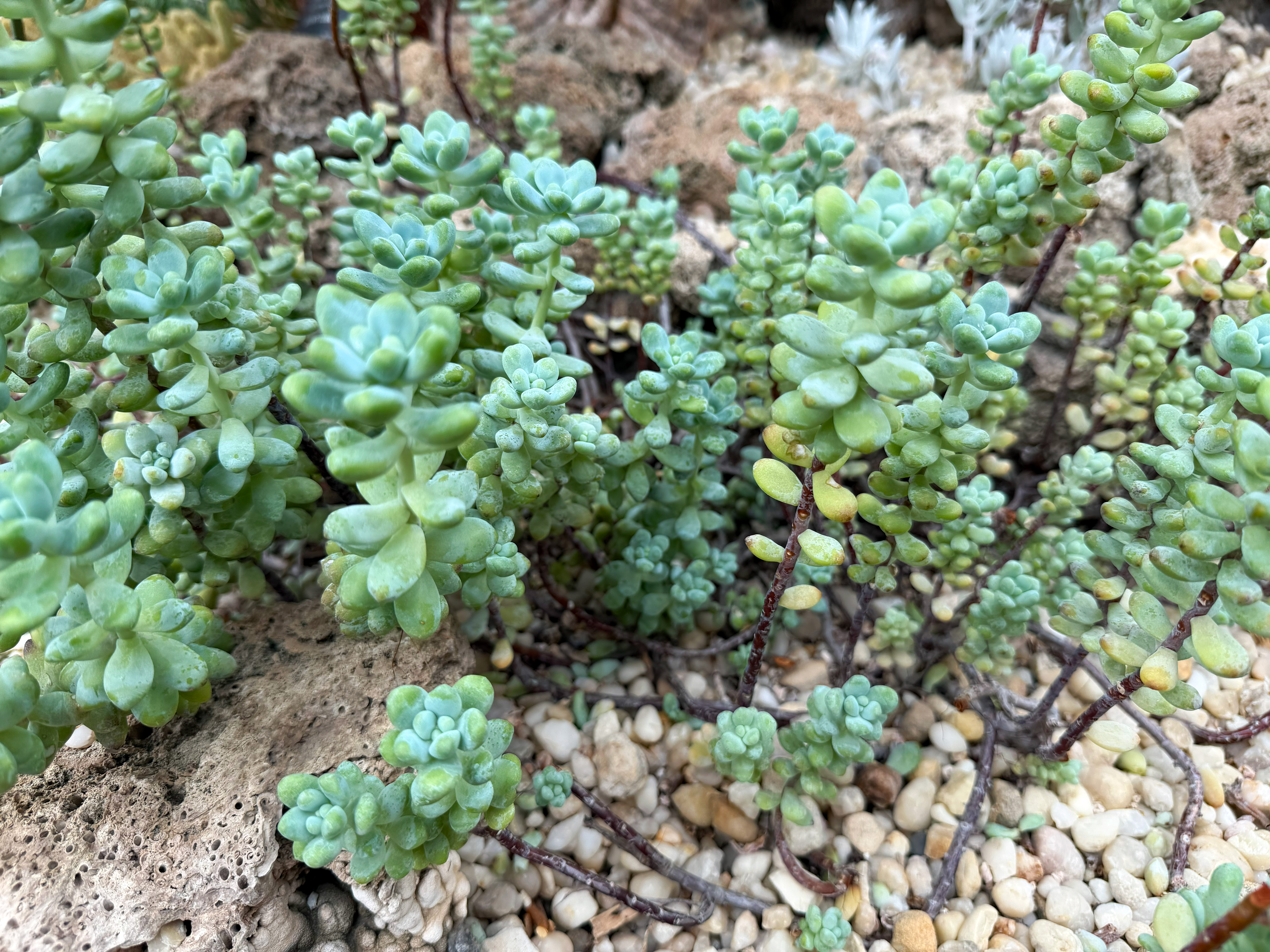

Scientific classification
- Kingdom: Plantae
- Clade: Tracheophytes
- Clade: Angiosperms
- Clade: Eudicots
- Order: Saxifragales
- Family: Crassulaceae
- Genus: Sedum
- Species: S. pachyphyllum

Binomial name
- Sedum pachyphyllum Rose

= Sedum pachyphyllum =

Species of flowering plant native to Mexico

Sedum pachyphyllum is a species of flowering plant in the stonecrop family, Crassulaceae.

== Description ==
Sedum pachyphyllum is a succulent perennial growing 10–30 cm (4–12 in) tall from a woody base. Its stems are branched and can either stand erect or spread across the ground. The glaucous leaves are 3–4 cm (1.2–1.6 in) long with circular cross sections 8–10 mm (0.3–0.4 in) wide and grow perpendicularly from the stems. In dry conditions, the tips of the leaves become reddish.

The flowering stem is 2 cm (0.8 in) long, spreading laterally, with flowers attached by short pedicels. The flowers have 5 green sepals, about 6 mm (0.24 in) long and widely spreading; petals are yellow and 7 mm (0.28 in) long. The type specimen was observed blooming in January.

== Distribution ==
Sedum pachyphyllum is endemic to central Mexico, where it grows in the Sierra Mixteca. Because of its use as an ornamental plant, S. pachyphyllum has become established outside its native range, especially in Spain, where naturalized populations have been documented in the provinces of Valencia and Castellón. In Italy, a naturalized population of plants growing near Riva del Garda were identified as hybrids between S. pachyphyllum and Echeveria agavoides.

== Taxonomy ==
The type specimen of Sedum pachyphyllum was collected by Carl Albert Purpus in 1907 near San Luis Amatlán in Oaxaca. Joseph Nelson Rose formally described the species in 1911. Its species epithet, pachyphyllum, comes from the Greek words pachys (meaning thick) and phyton (meaning plant), referring to the plant's thick, fleshy leaves. S. pachyphyllum belongs to a clade of about 90 closely-related species within the Sedum genus called section Pachysedum, one of 22 sections named by Alwin Berger in 1930.

Two hybrids with S. pachyphyllum parentage have been formally described. The artificial hybrid Sedum × rubrotinctum (S. pachyphyllum × S. stahlii), sometimes called the jelly bean plant, is a popular ornamental plant. The intergeneric hybrid × Sedeveria mauroi (Echeveria agavoides × S. pachyphyllum) is an introduced species in Italy.

== Uses ==
Sedum pachyphyllum is cultivated, including for use in gardens and on green roofs, in part because of its drought tolerance.
