= Anna Scripps Whitcomb =

American horticulturist and philanthropist

- Born: March 5, 1866; Detroit
- Died: March 28, 1953 (aged 87); Detroit

Anna Scripps Whitcomb (March 5, 1866 – March 28, 1953) was an American philanthropist. She was the daughter of The Detroit News founder James E. Scripps.

She was an avid gardener and art collector. After her husband died in 1930 she became specialized in orchidiae. At her death she bequeathed her art collection to the Detroit Institute of Arts, where it is known as the collection of Mr. and Mrs. Edgar B. Whitcomb. She had previously donated Correggio's Mystic Marriage of Saint Catherine in memory of her father, who had also been a museum founder. In April 1955 she gave her 600 orchids collection to Belle Isle Conservatory, which was therefore renamed in her honor on April 6, 1955. Many of these exotic orchids had been saved from Britain throughout World War II.
