= List of Sempervivoideae genera =

List of genera in the subfamily Sempervivoideae

About thirty genera are within the Crassulaceae subfamily Sempervivoideae. A number of these have been at times, embedded within the very large genus Sedum s.s..

== Alphabetical list of genera ==
- Aeonium
- Aichryson
- Cremnophila
- Dudleya
- Echeveria
- Graptopetalum
- Hylotelephium
- Kungia
- Lenophyllum
- Meterostachys
- Monanthes
- Mucizonia
- Orostachys
- Pachyphytum
- Perrierosedum
- Petrosedum
- Phedimus
- Pistorinia
- Prometheum
- Pseudosedum
- Rhodiola
- Rosularia
- Sedella
- Sedum
- Sempervivum
- Sinocrassula
- Thompsonella
- Umbilicus
- Villadia

The genus Sedum constitutes about 50% of the species of the family Crassulaceae.

== Bibliography ==
- Thiede, J; Eggli, U (2007). "Crassulaceae". In Kubitzki, Klaus (ed.). Berberidopsidales, Buxales, Crossosomatales, Fabales p.p., Geraniales, Gunnerales, Myrtales p.p., Proteales, Saxifragales, Vitales, Zygophyllales, Clusiaceae Alliance, Passifloraceae Alliance, Dilleniaceae, Huaceae, Picramniaceae, Sabiaceae. pp. 83–119. ISBN 978-3540322146. (full text at ResearchGate)
- Gontcharova, S. B.; Gontcharov, A. A. (11 October 2009). "Molecular phylogeny and systematics of flowering plants of the family Crassulaceae DC". Molecular Biology. 43 (5): 794–803. doi:10.1134/S0026893309050112. S2CID 39602334.
- Nikulin, Vyacheslav Yu.; Gontcharova, Svetlana B.; Stephenson, Ray; Gontcharov, Andrey A. (September 2016). "Phylogenetic relationships between Sedum L. and related genera (Crassulaceae) based on ITS rDNA sequence comparisons". Flora. 224: 218–229. doi:10.1016/j.flora.2016.08.003.
