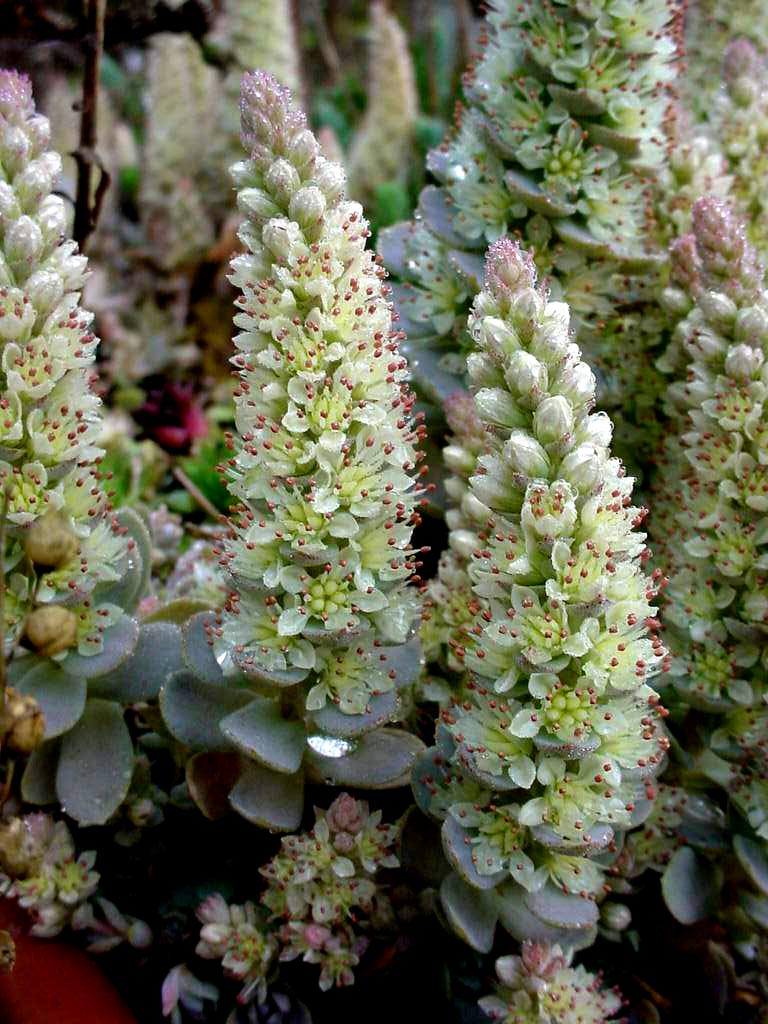
- Orostachys malacophylla var. iwarenge

Scientific classification
- Kingdom: Plantae
- Clade: Tracheophytes
- Clade: Angiosperms
- Clade: Eudicots
- Order: Saxifragales
- Family: Crassulaceae
- Tribe: Telephieae
- Genus: Orostachys

Species
- See text.

= Orostachys =

Genus of flowering plants

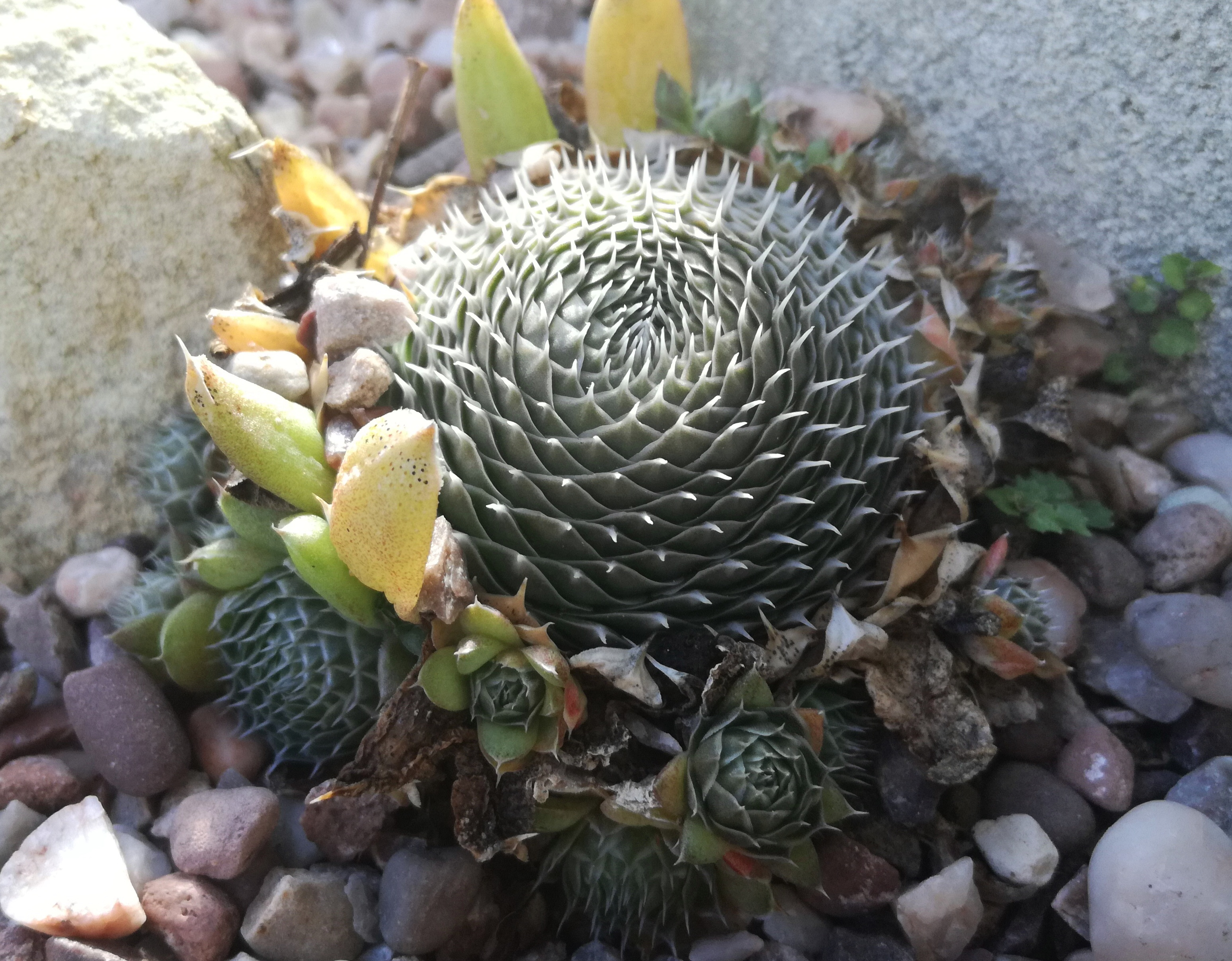
Orostachys spinosa

Orostachys is a genus of the succulent family Crassulaceae (stonecrop family) that contains about 15 species. It is a biennial herb growing in China, Japan, Kazakhstan, Korea, Mongolia, Russia. Eight species occur in China.

== Description ==
Orostachys are the most morphologically distinct member of subfamily Sempervivoideae. Orostachys species are mostly biennial herbaceous plants that are more or less succulent. Leaves are linear to ovate, often with dull purple dots. The arrangement is alternate, forming crowded cauline rosettes. Especially the thick-fleshed foliage stores water. The leaf ends have a cartilaginous to spiny, white tip. Leaf margins are usually smooth. Stipules are absent. The roots are fibrous and there is no rhizome.

In the first year, the leaves stand together in solitary, basal, dense rosettes. In the second year, a solitary, leafy stem, 5 to 60 cm in length, arises from the center of the rosette and forms flowers. The terminal inflorescences, usually branched and composed of individual spicate inflorescences, are relatively large and narrowly pyramidal to cylindrical, containing many flowers and foliage-like bracts. The flowers, which are at most very short-stemmed, are hermaphroditic and pentamerous. The free sepals are usually shorter than the petals. The five predominantly yellow, rarely white, yellow-green, or pinkish to reddish petals are almost free. There are two circles with five stamens. The yellowish nectary scales are relatively small. The erect carpels are free and contain many ovules. The styles are narrow.

The many-seeded follicles possess a beak-like end. The seeds are small.

== Taxonomy ==
Within family Crassulaceae, Orostachys is placed in tribe Telephieae of subfamily Sempervivoideae. The genus has at times included Meterostachys. Molecular phylogenetics shows that the genus is not monophyletic, but polyphyletic with respect to Hylotelephium. Its circumscription, therefore, is unstable and subject to revision.

=== Subdivision ===
The genus Orostachys has been divided into series (or sections), including:

- Orostachys series Appendiculatae
- Orostachys series Eappendiculatae

Other authors have created two different sections:

- Orostachys section Orostachys
- Orostachys section Schoenlandia

Some species were transferred from Sinocrassula into Orostachys, as section Schoenlandia, also treated as a subgenus or section, or a separate genus Kungia, e.g. O. schoenlandii (Kungia schoenlandii). Orostachys section Orostachys, in turn has been treated as two subsections, differing by either flat or fleshy leaf shape, and the presence or absence of appendages on the leaves, which include spines or cartilaginous protrusions:

- Orostachys subsection Orostachys
- Orostachys subsection Appendiculatae

On the basis of molecular data, it has been proposed that Orostachys subsection Appendiculatae be considered a separate genus.

==== Species ====
The genus includes about 12–17 accepted species, including:

- Orostachys aggregata (Makino) H. Hara
- Orostachys boehmeri V.N. Boriss. – also called O. furusei, endemic plant from Japan
- Orostachys cartilaginea (H. Lév.) A. Berger
- Orostachys chanetii A. Berger
- Orostachys fimbriata (Turcz.) A.Berger
- Orostachys genkaiensis Ohwi
- Orostachys iwarenge Hara – Chinese Dunce Cap
- Orostachys malacophylla (Pall.) Fisch. – type species
- Orostachys minuta (Kom.) A. Berger
- Orostachys paradoxa (Khokhr. & Vorosch.) Czerep.
- Orostachys sikokiana (Makino) Ohwi
- Orostachys spinosa (L.) Sweet
- Orostachys thyrsiflora Fisch.

== Bibliography ==
- Thiede, J; Eggli, U (2007). "Crassulaceae". In Kubitzki, Klaus (ed.). Berberidopsidales, Buxales, Crossosomatales, Fabales p.p., Geraniales, Gunnerales, Myrtales p.p., Proteales, Saxifragales, Vitales, Zygophyllales, Clusiaceae Alliance, Passifloraceae Alliance, Dilleniaceae, Huaceae, Picramniaceae, Sabiaceae. Springer. pp. 83–119. ISBN 978-3540322146. (full text at ResearchGate)
- Gontcharova, S. B.; Artyukova, E. V.; Gontcharov, A. A. (June 2006). "Phylogenetic relationships among members of the subfamily Sedoideae (Crassulaceae) inferred from the ITS region sequences of nuclear rDNA" (PDF). Russian Journal of Genetics. 42 (6): 654–661. doi:10.1134/S102279540606010X. S2CID 33249840. Archived from the original (PDF) on 2017-08-09.
- Mayuzumi, Shinzo; Ohba, Hideaki (2004). "The Phylogenetic Position of Eastern Asian Sedoideae (Crassulaceae) Inferred from Chloroplast and Nuclear DNA Sequences". Systematic Botany. 29 (3): 587–598. doi:10.1600/0363644041744329. ISSN 0363-6445. JSTOR 25063994. S2CID 84319808.
- TPL (2013). "The Plant List Version 1.1: Orostachys". Royal Botanic Gardens, Kew and Missouri Botanical Garden.
- "Orostachys". Tropicos. Missouri Botanical Garden. 2015.
- Fu, Kunjun; Ohba, Hideaki; Gilbert, Michael G. (2004). "Orostachys Fisch". p. 206., in Flora of China online vol. 8
