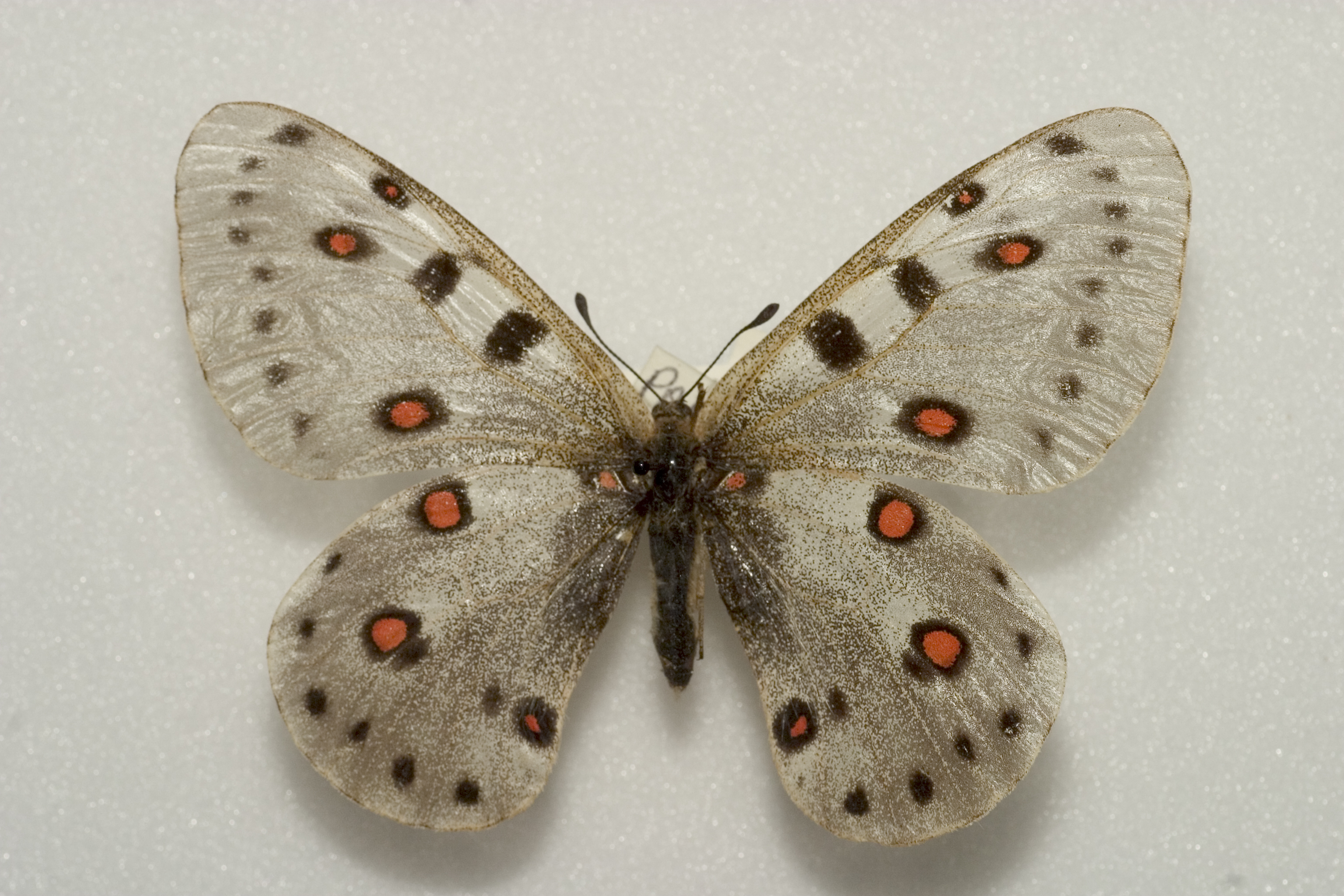

Scientific classification
- Domain: Eukaryota
- Kingdom: Animalia
- Phylum: Arthropoda
- Class: Insecta
- Order: Lepidoptera
- Family: Papilionidae
- Genus: Parnassius
- Species: P. apollonius

Binomial name
- Parnassius apollonius (Eversmann, 1847)

= Parnassius apollonius =

Eversmann's Apollo

Species of butterfly

Parnassius apollonius is a member of the snow Apollo genus Parnassius of the swallowtail family, Papilionidae. It is found in central and south Kazakhstan, the south Altai, Saur, Tarbagatai, Dzhungarsky Alatau, Tian-Shan, Ghissar-Darvaz, the Pamirs-Alai and west China.

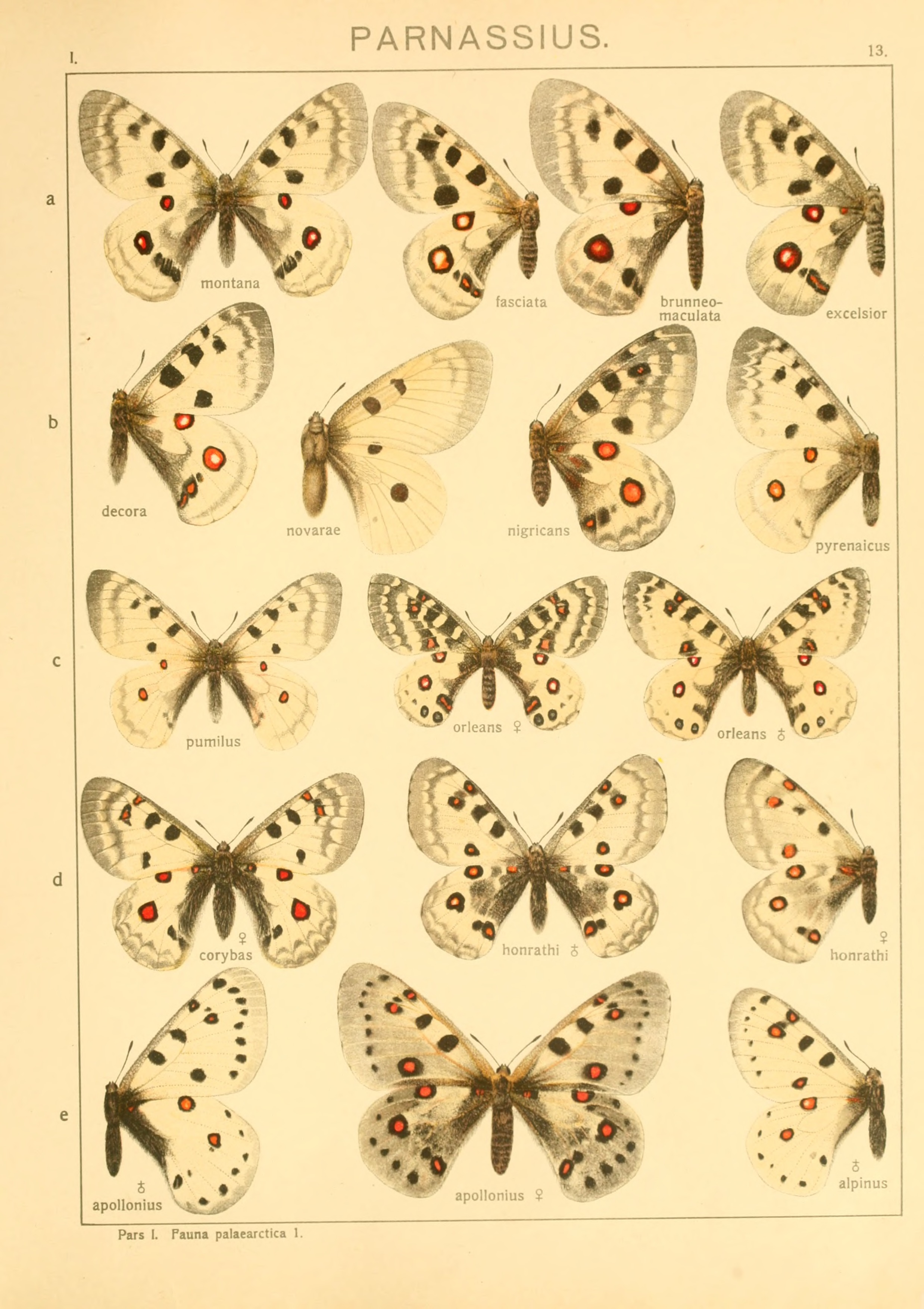
Parnassius apollonius and allied species

This species is found from a broad altitudinal zone (500 to 3,000 m). Adults fly over dry mountain slopes in May, June and July depending on the altitude.

Larval host plants include Pseudosedum, and Rosularia species.

== Diagnostic description ==
Note. The wing pattern in Parnassius species is inconsistent and the very many subspecies and forms make identification problematic and uncertain. Structural characters derived from the genitalia, wing venation, sphragis and foretibial epiphysis are more, but not entirely reliable. The description given here is a guide only. For an identification key see Ackery P.R. (1975).

P. apollonius is recognizable especially by the sharply defined black submarginal spots of both wings; moreover, in males there is hardly a distinct greyish vitreous marginal band, the edge being however a little more sparsely scaled with white than the disc and only anteriorly shaded with grey. Arrangement of spots as in the allied species; three costal spots beyond the cell, the central one being usually vestigial, the proximal or the distal one or both centred with red, the hindmarginal spot rarely quite black. Hindwing with red basal spot; the abdominal area deep black, anal spots present; on the underside three red basal spots, one of them situated behind the cell, being much more distal than the others and more feebly marked. Female washed with blackish grey, almost transparent, costal and hindmarginal spots of forewing more broadly filled in with red; hindwing without black abdominal area, being here only dusted with black as on disc. Antenna and abdomen black above, the latter sparsely clothed with white hairs.

== Subspecies ==
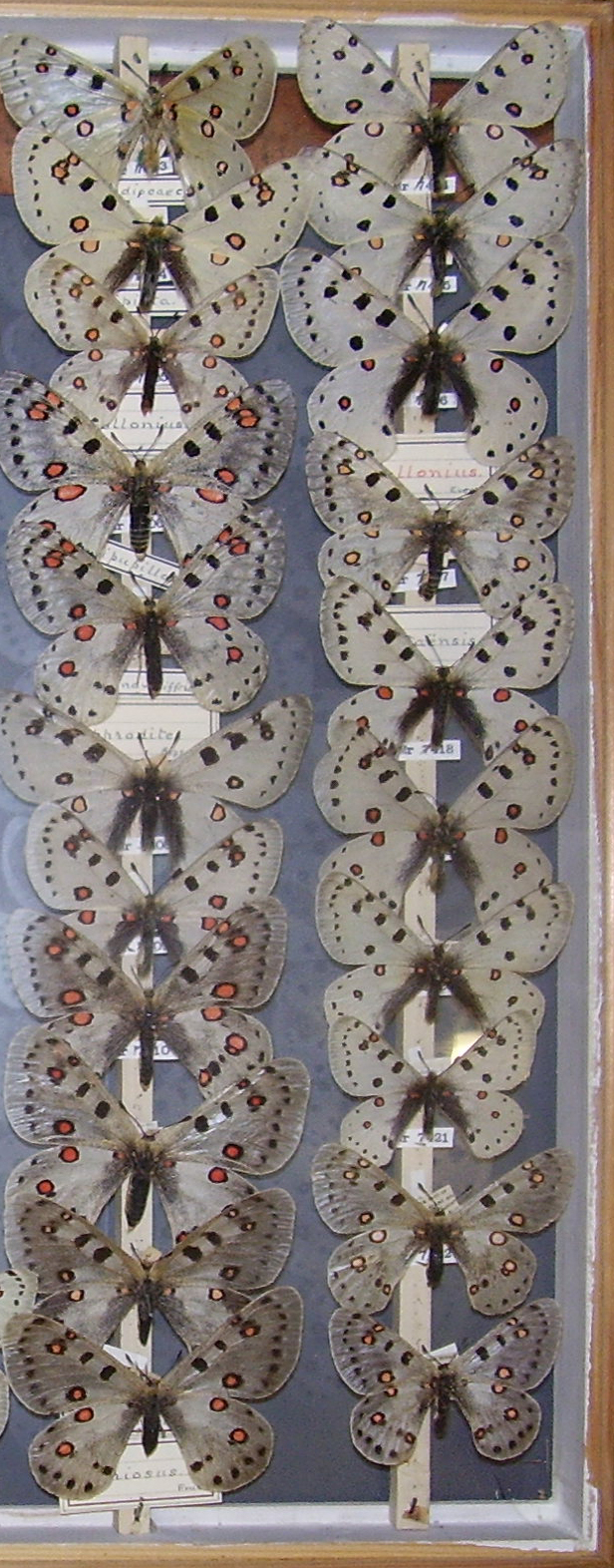
Museum specimens of Parnassius apollonius

There are many subspecies. The better described ones include:

- P. a. poseidon Bryk & Eisner, 1934 (western Tian Shan)
- P. a. glaucopis Bryk & Eisner, 1934 (southern Kazakhstan)
- P. a. gloriosus Fruhstorfer, 1904 (northern Tian Shan)
- P. a. narynus Fruhstorfer, 1908 (inner Tian Shan)
- P. a. alpinus Staudinger, 1887 (Alai)
- P. a. daubi Fruhstorfer, 1903 (Ghissar)
- nominate found in the southern Altai, Saur, Tarbagatai and Dzhungarsky Alatau
- P. a. aphrodite Bryk & Eisner, 1934 (Ili River valley)
