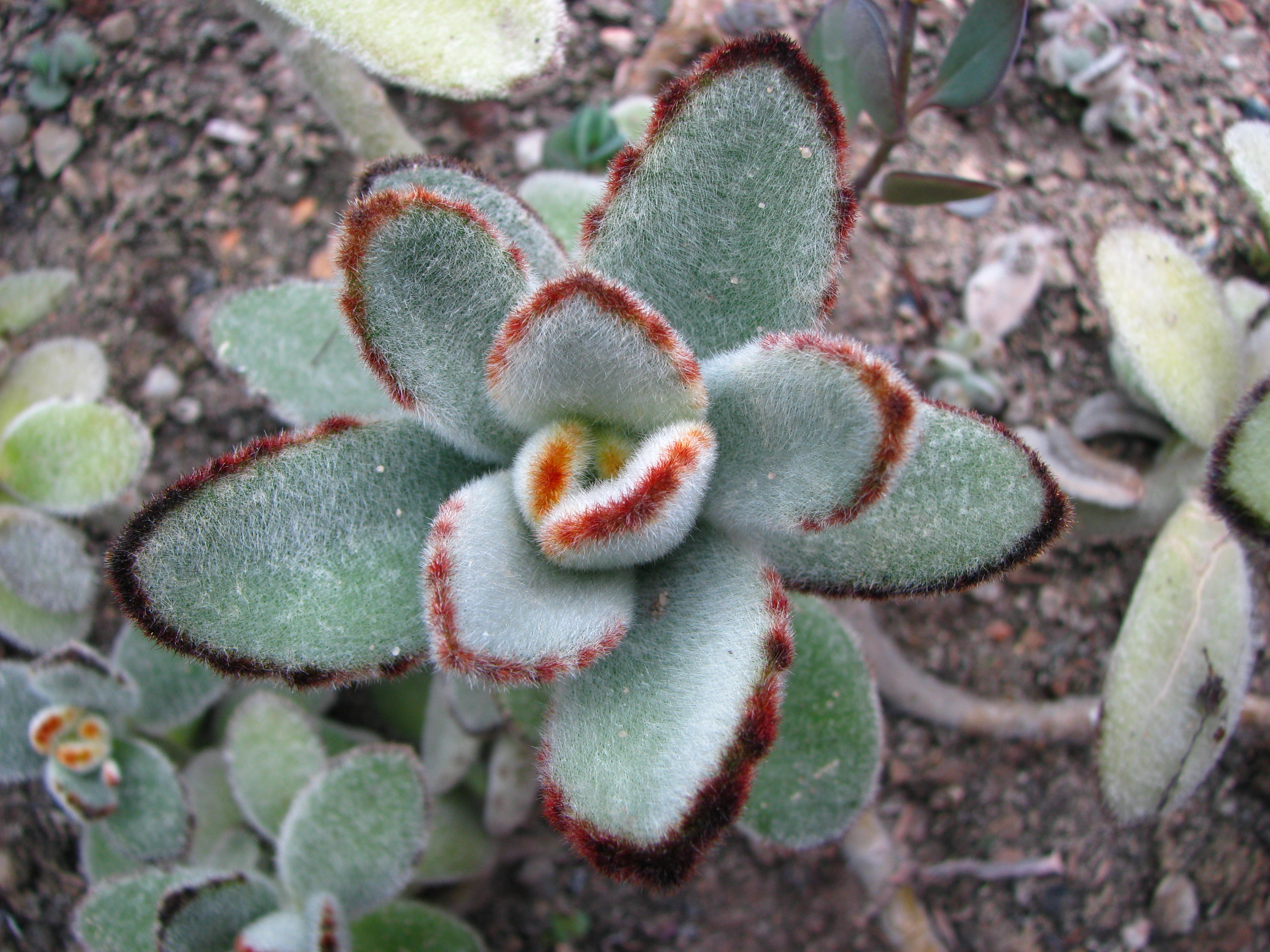

Scientific classification
- Kingdom: Plantae
- Clade: Tracheophytes
- Clade: Angiosperms
- Clade: Eudicots
- Order: Saxifragales
- Family: Crassulaceae
- Genus: Kalanchoe
- Species: K. tomentosa

Binomial name
- Kalanchoe tomentosa Baker (1882)

Synonyms
- Bryophyllum triangulare Blanco (1845), nom. utique rej.

= Kalanchoe tomentosa =

Species of succulent plant

Kalanchoe tomentosa, also known as the panda plant, pussy ears, or chocolate soldier, is a species of succulent plant in the family Crassulaceae. A native of Madagascar, it is widely cultivated as an ornamental plant due to its distinctive velvety, silver-green leaves with chocolate-brown markings. It has received the Royal Horticultural Society's Award of Garden Merit.

== Description ==
Kalanchoe tomentosa is a slow-growing, evergreen, semi-woody perennial succulent subshrub with an erect growth form. It can reach a height of 0.4 to 1 m (1.3 to 3.3 ft) and a spread of up to 0.9 m (3.0 ft), though it typically remains smaller in cultivation, around 30 to 50 cm (12 to 20 in). Young roots are red with white tips.

The most distinctive feature of the plant is its leaves, which are thick, fleshy, and oval-shaped, typically measuring up to 9 cm (3.5 in) in length. The leaves are arranged opposite or in a loose rosette and are densely covered with fine, silvery-white to grayish hairs (trichomes), giving them a velvety or felt-like texture. The leaf margins are scalloped and tipped with a series of dark brown to rusty-red spots or a continuous chocolate-brown rim, a characteristic that inspired the common name "chocolate soldier." In mature plants, young leaves appear whitish and erect, while older leaves become lighter green, less fuzzy, and more horizontal.

The flowers are small, tubular, and bell-shaped, measuring about 1 cm (0.39 in) in length, and are borne in panicles atop erect stalks that can reach up to 45 cm (18 in) in height. Flower colors range from greenish-white to yellow-green, sometimes with brown or purple petal tips. In their natural habitat, they bloom between March and June; however, indoor plants rarely flower. The fruit is a dry capsule containing numerous small seeds.

== Taxonomy ==
The species was first described by the British botanist John Gilbert Baker in 1882 in the Journal of Botany, British and Foreign, based on collections made from east-central Madagascar. The specific epithet tomentosa is derived from the Latin tomentosus, meaning "covered with dense, matted hairs," in reference to the plant's velvety foliage. A heterotypic synonym, Bryophyllum triangulare Blanco (1845), has been rejected as a name to be rejected.

In a 2023 revision, Smith provided an amplified description of the species and designated an epitype to clarify the application of the name. The species is highly variable in leaf shape, hair density, and margin coloration, which has led to the description of numerous cultivars.

== Distribution and habitat ==
Kalanchoe tomentosa is endemic to east-central Madagascar, where it grows primarily in the seasonally dry tropical biome. Its natural habitat consists of rocky, well-drained soils, often on granite outcrops, in arid and semi-arid regions.

== Cultivars ==
Numerous cultivars have been developed, selected for variations in leaf size, shape, and coloration:

- 'Chocolate Soldier' – The most common cultivar, featuring narrower, pale-colored leaves with a more uniform and thicker dark chocolate-brown margin. It is reportedly faster-growing and has a clumping habit.
- 'Golden Girl' – Characterized by golden-yellow, fuzzy leaves that become more vibrant with increased sunlight exposure. It produces clusters of golden trumpet-shaped flowers.
- 'Teddy Bear' – Features rounder, chocolate-brown leaves densely covered with fuzz and almost black markings at the tips.
- 'Cinnamon' – Has long, oval-shaped russet leaves that appear almost black when grown in full sun.
- 'Nigra' – Exhibits extremely dark brown to nearly black leaf margins, which can be dotted or continuous.
- 'Rubra' – Displays a reddish hue, particularly pronounced along the leaf edges, with a golden-red shimmer.
- 'Black Tie' – Another dark-margined selection.

== Cultivation ==
Kalanchoe tomentosa is widely cultivated as a houseplant and in rock gardens, container gardens, and succulent gardens in warm climates. It is prized for its attractive, tactile foliage and low-maintenance requirements.

=== Growing conditions ===
The plant thrives in bright, indirect sunlight, though it can tolerate some direct sun; however, intense afternoon sun may cause leaf burn. Insufficient light results in leggy, elongated growth.

A well-draining potting mix, such as a cactus or succulent mix, is essential to prevent root rot. The plant prefers temperatures between 15 and 23 °C (59 and 73 °F) and is not frost-hardy; it should be grown in USDA hardiness zones 9–11 or brought indoors during winter.

=== Watering and feeding ===
Water should be applied thoroughly but infrequently, allowing the top 2.5 cm (0.98 in) of soil to dry out completely between waterings. Overwatering is a common cause of plant failure, leading to root rot and mushy leaves. During the winter dormancy period, watering should be reduced significantly. Fertilization is generally minimal; a half-strength balanced liquid fertilizer can be applied monthly during the growing season.

=== Propagation ===
The species is easily propagated by stem or leaf cuttings. Cuttings should be allowed to callus for one to two days before being placed in a well-draining potting mix. Seeds can also be used, sown at 19 to 21 °C (66 to 70 °F) in early spring.

=== Pests and diseases ===
Common pests include mealybugs, aphids, and spider mites. Overwatering can lead to root rot, and high humidity may promote powdery mildew or rust. Shriveled or wrinkled leaves typically indicate underwatering, while yellow or mushy leaves suggest overwatering.

== Toxicity ==
Like many species in the genus Kalanchoe, K. tomentosa is toxic to cats and dogs, and mildly toxic to humans if ingested. It is recommended to keep the plant out of reach of pets and small children.

== Common names ==
The plant is known by many common names across different languages and regions:

- English: Panda plant, pussy ears, chocolate soldier, velvet leaf kalanchoe, plush plant, teddy bear cactus, cocoon plant
- Chinese: 月兔耳 (yuè tù ěr, "moon rabbit ear") or 褐斑伽蓝 (hè bān qié lán)
- Dutch: Pandaplant
- Indonesian: Kaktus panda
- Polish: Żyworódka omszona
- Ukrainian: Каланхое повстисте

== Uses ==
The plant is primarily grown as an ornamental for its striking foliage. It is suitable for indoor containers, hanging baskets, rooftop gardens, and rockeries. In its native Madagascar, there is a popular belief that when a panda plant flowers for someone, it is an indication of richness and prosperity for their household.

== Conservation ==
As of 2026, Kalanchoe tomentosa has not been formally assessed for the IUCN Red List. However, it is listed as a species of "least concern" by the Angiosperm Extinction Risk Predictions project, though with low confidence. The species is widely cultivated and not considered threatened in the wild, though habitat loss in Madagascar could impact wild populations.

== See also ==
- List of kalanchoe diseases
