= Chaloupkaea =

Scientific classification
- Kingdom: Plantae
- Clade: Tracheophytes
- Clade: Angiosperms
- Clade: Eudicots
- Order: Saxifragales
- Family: Crassulaceae
- Genus: Chaloupkaea; Niederle

Genus of flowering plants

Chaloupkaea is a genus of flowering plants belonging to the family Crassulaceae.

Its native range is Turkey to Northern Iraq.

Species:

- Chaloupkaea aizoon (Fenzl) Niederle
- Chaloupkaea bonorum-hominum (Niederle) Niederle
- Chaloupkaea chrysantha (Boiss. & Heldr.) Niederle
- Chaloupkaea gigantea (Eggli) Niederle
- Chaloupkaea muratdaghensis (Kit Tan) Niederle
- Chaloupkaea pisidica (Niederle) Niederle
- Chaloupkaea rechingeri (C.-A.Jansson) Niederle
- Chaloupkaea serpentinica (Werderm.) Niederle
