= Hypagophytum =

Scientific classification
- Kingdom: Plantae
- Clade: Embryophytes
- Clade: Tracheophytes
- Clade: Angiosperms
- Clade: Eudicots
- Order: Saxifragales
- Family: Crassulaceae
- Subfamily: Crassuloideae
- Genus: Hypagophytum; A.Berger
- Species: H. abyssinicum

Binomial name
- Hypagophytum abyssinicum (Hochst. ex A.Rich.) A.Berger

Genus of flowering plants

Hypagophytum is a genus of plants in the family Crassulaceae. It includes only the species Hypagophytum abyssinicum, endemic to Eritrea and Ethiopia.
