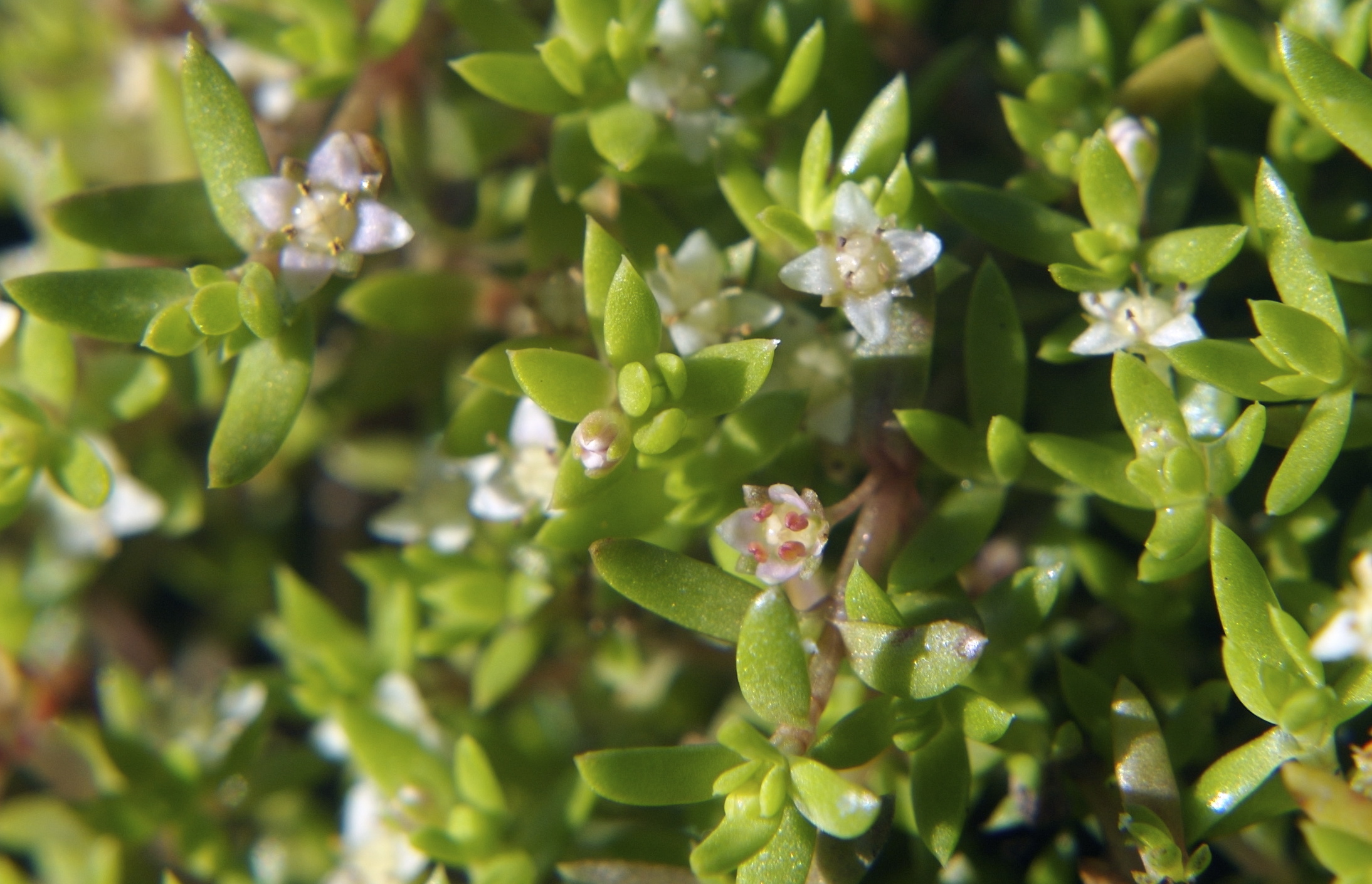
- Leaves and flowers of C. helmsii

Scientific classification
- Kingdom: Plantae
- Clade: Embryophytes
- Clade: Tracheophytes
- Clade: Angiosperms
- Clade: Eudicots
- Order: Saxifragales
- Family: Crassulaceae
- Genus: Crassula
- Species: C. helmsii

Binomial name
- Crassula helmsii (Kirk) Cockayne

Synonyms
- Tillaea recurva Hook.f.; Tillaea helmsii Kirk; Crassula recurva (Hook.f.) Ostenf.

= Crassula helmsii =

Swamp stonecrop

Species of plant

Crassula helmsii, known as swamp stonecrop or New Zealand pigmyweed, is an aquatic or semiterrestrial species of succulent plant in the family Crassulaceae. Originally found in Australia and New Zealand, it has been introduced around the world. In the United Kingdom, this plant is one of five introduced invasive aquatic plants that were banned from sale from April 2014, the first ban of its kind in the country. It is on the Global Biodiversity Information Facility's Global Register of Introduced and Invasive Species of eleven countries.

== Description ==
The shoots are rather stiff, carrying narrow parallel-sided leaves in opposite pairs, each leaf being about 4–24 millimetres (0.16–0.94 in). Small white flowers with four petals are produced in summer on long stalks arising from the upper leaf axils. The flowers are always above water.

== Distribution ==
C. helmsii was recorded in 2010 throughout the British Isles, in the Netherlands, Belgium, the United States, Russia, France, Germany, Italy and Spain In Ireland, C. helmsii has been recorded on waste ground in Ireland at Howth Head, County Dublin, and at a number of sites in Northern Ireland.

== Ecological aspects ==
The plant grows on the muddy margins of ponds where it forms carpets with 100% cover, semi-submerged in deeper water, or totally submerged with elongated stems. It does not die back in winter. It has been reported to be very tolerant to copper toxicity and to be a hyperaccumulator of copper.

== Cultivation ==
C. helmsii is able to grow fully submerged in a cool-water aquarium or as a submersed or marginal plant in a pond. Once established it can grow vigorously and may need to be trimmed back. Schedule 9 of the UK Wildlife and Countryside Act 1981 lists this plant as one that must not be caused to grow in the wild.
