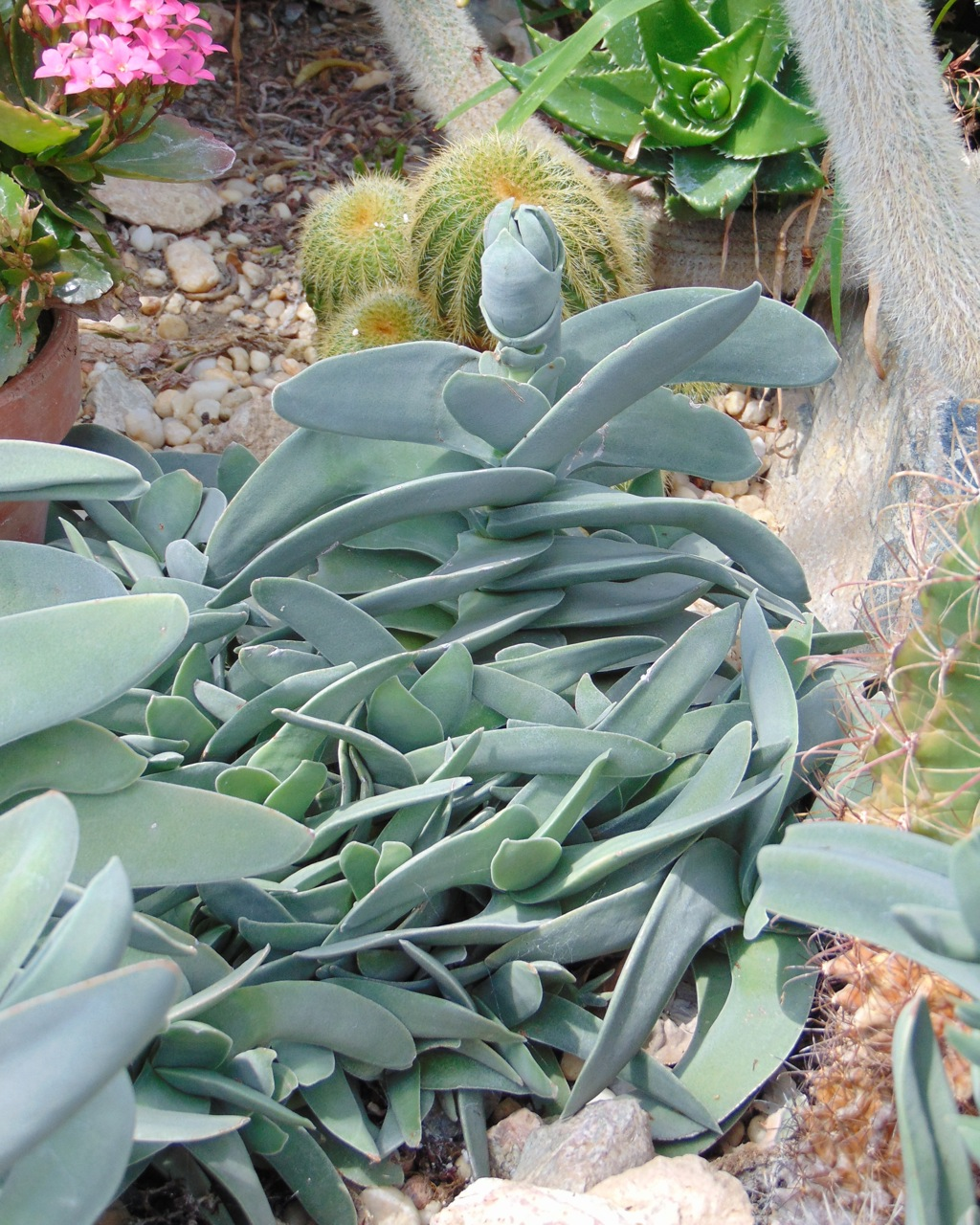
- Crassula perfoliata

Scientific classification
- Kingdom: Plantae
- Clade: Tracheophytes
- Clade: Angiosperms
- Clade: Eudicots
- Order: Saxifragales
- Family: Crassulaceae; J.St.-Hil.

Type genus
- Crassula L.

Subfamilies
- Crassuloideae Burnett; Kalanchoideae or Kalanchoöideae A.Berger; Sempervivoideae Arn.

Synonyms
- Sempervivae [Sempervivaceae] Jussieu

= Crassulaceae =

Family of flowering plants

The Crassulaceae (/ˈkræsjuːleɪsiːˌiː, -siˌaɪ/, from Latin crassus, thick), also known as the crassulas, the stonecrops or the orpine family, are a diverse family of flowering plants primarily characterized by succulent leaves and a form of photosynthesis known as crassulacean acid metabolism (CAM), in which plants photosynthesize in the daytime and exchange gases during the cooler temperatures of the night. The blossoms of crassulas generally have five floral parts. Crassulaceae are usually herbaceous, though there are some subshrubs, and relatively few trees or aquatic plants.

The Crassulaceae is a medium-sized family in the core eudicots clade, along with the order Saxifragales, whose diversity has made infrafamilial classification very difficult. The family includes over 1,800 species and 34–40 genera—depending on the circumscription of the genus Sedum—distributed over three subfamilies. Members of the Crassulaceae are found worldwide, though are mostly concentrated in the Northern Hemisphere and Southern Africa (where the most species are found). They are adapted to thrive in typically dry, arid (hot or cold) areas where water may be scarce, and richer, organic substrates may be at a minimum or nonexistent. The Sempervivum (houseleeks) of Central and Southern Europe, or the Orostachys (dunce-caps) of Asia, for example, grow in rocky crevices at higher elevations, where soil is at a minimum but precipitation, sun exposure, and winds may be intense; these plants have thus adapted to absorb water by having succulent leaves, despite living often on slopes or near-vertical cliff faces, from which water typically drains quickly. Their roots are adhesive and grip to any rock, dirt, wood or other surface they come into contact with, while also gleaning minerals from said material. Seedlings that may sprout near more permanent sources of water, such as pooling rainwater or seeps, may experience rot or discoloration over time, and not survive.

Crassulaceae are mainly perennial, and have huge global economic importance as collectible specimens, and as indoor and outdoor garden plants. Many species in the family, especially of the African genera, have highly unusual (for plants) and otherworldly appearances, often with interesting textures (fuzzy, hairy, spiky, scaly) or curious nodules or growths, all of which are typically the result of environmental adaptations, such as "fuzzy" Kalanchoe tomentosa utilizing its hairs as a sunscreen. Apart from some sensitive species, most are quite hardy, typically needing only minimal care. For every alien-looking species, there are just as many others with a more "conventional", rosette growth habit, something reflected in many common names, such as 'Black Rose', another name for the common Aeonium arboreum var. 'Swartzkopf'.

Well-known genera and species include the many forms of Crassula ovata ('Jade', 'Money Plant' or 'Friendship Tree'), Kalanchoe blossfeldiana (florists' or supermarket-kalanchoe); Cotyledon, such as 'Chalk Fingers' and 'Pig's Ear', Sempervivum such as cobweb houseleek (or hen-and-chicks) and S. calcareum, and Aeonium such as A. haworthii (and its popular variegate 'Kiwi'), A. arboreum, A. canariense, A. urbicum; Monanthes, Umbilicus (pennywort), Bryophyllum, Echeveria, Sedum and Dudleya.

== Description ==
Morphology

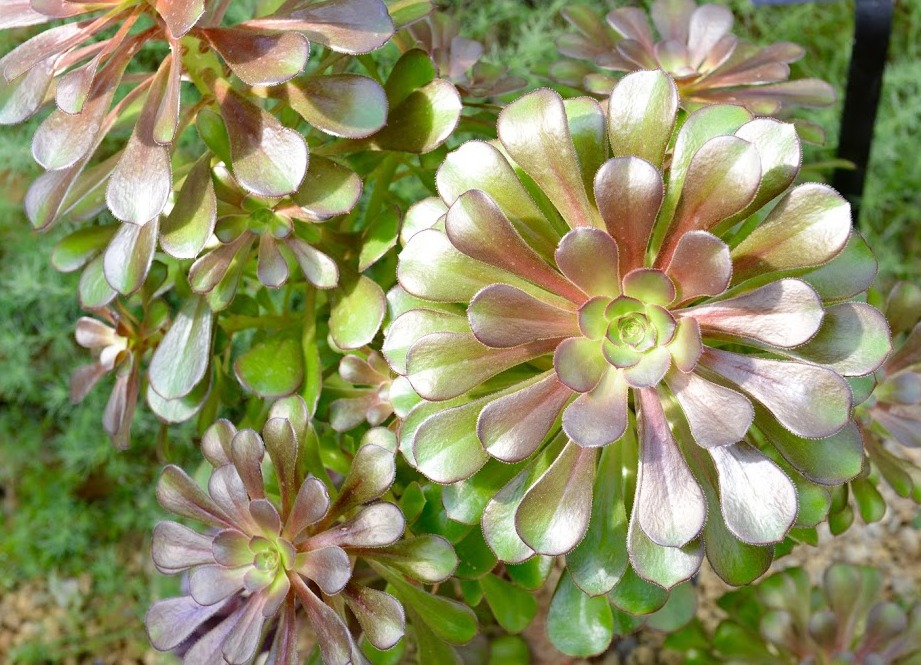
Aeonium arboreum (Aeonieae): Succulent leaves in rosettes

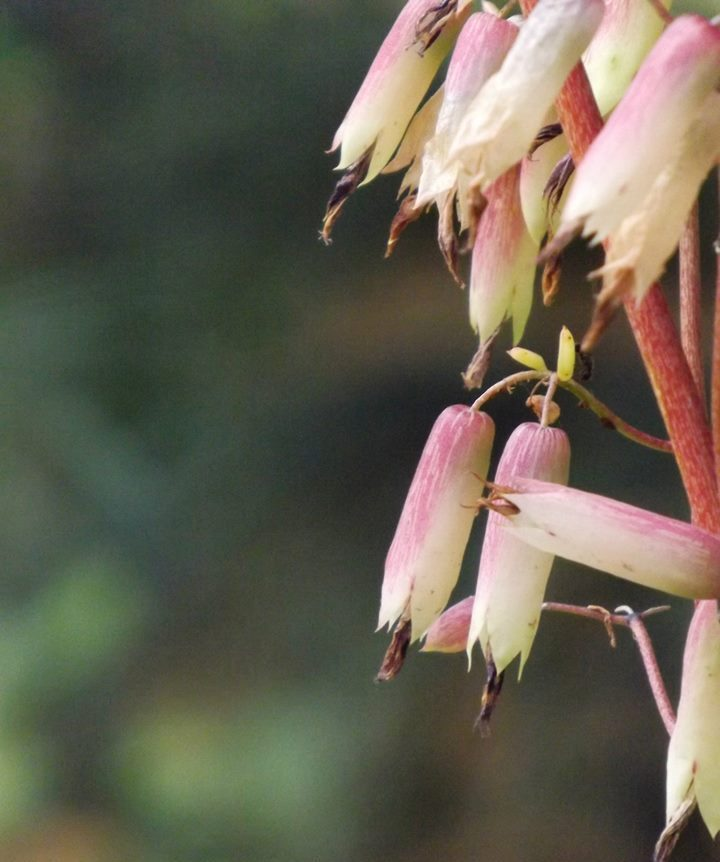
Kalanchoe pinnata (Kalanchoöideae): Corolla tubes

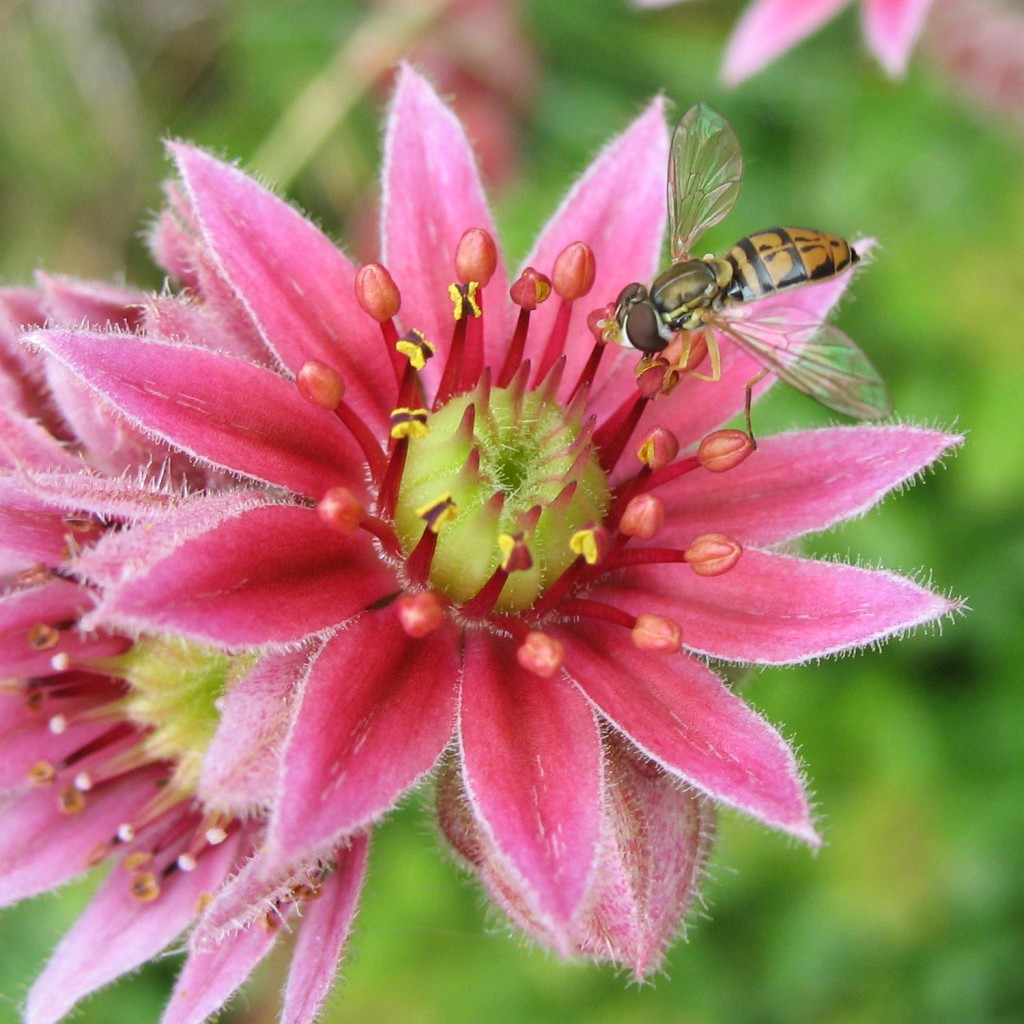
Sempervivum sp. (Sempervivoideae): Apopetaly, actinomorphy, polymery, stamens in 2 whorls

General: Crassulaceae is a monophyletic family of morphologically diverse terrestrial perennial, rarely annual or hapaxanthic (flowering once in a lifetime), flowering plants that demonstrate xerophytic adaptations, with thick succulent leaves, a thick waxy cuticle and Crassulacean acid metabolism. Crassulaceae are generally herbaceous but there are some subshrubs, and relatively few treelike, epiphytic (growing on surface of plants), scandent (vine like) or aquatic plants. Most species are herbaceous leaf succulents, with regular 5 part (pentamerous or fivemerous) flowers, isomerous free carpels and one or two whorls of stamens.

Vegetative: stems are sometimes succulent, as may also be the underground caudices (rootstock), and may form rhizomes or corms. Bulbils may form along the stem or leaf margins. The leaf arrangement is opposite and decussate or alternate and spiral, and they are frequently aggregated into rosettes. The leaf shape is simple (rarely pinnate) and usually entire, or crenate to broadly lobed, sometimes dentate or more deeply incised, glabrous (smooth) or tomentose. In cross section the leaf blades are flat or round. They may be sessile or petiolate. Stipules are absent. New plants often form easily from vegetative parts that fall off the parent plant.

Reproductive: The inflorescence is usually terminal to lateral with many-flowered thyrses of cymes, less commonly spikes, racemes or panicles, rarely few to single flowered and axillary. The inflorescence is often many-branched and bracteate. The flower clusters are red, yellow, or white.

The flowers are often apopetalous (separate corolla segments), pentamerous (five-parted), actinomorphic (radially symmetrical), except for the zygomorphic Tylecodon grandiflorus, with one to two whorls of 4–20 sepals that are usually as many as or twice as many as the number of petals and two whorls of stamens, five in each whorl (i.e. as many as or twice the number of petals), with their filaments either free or fused to the petals at the base and sometimes unequal. Anthers are basifixed and open lengthwise. The flowers are bisexual, less commonly unisexual (more or less dioecious). Ovaries superior to partially inferior, with carpels equal to the number of petals, each forming a single locule, superior, free or almost so, basally with a small to conspicuous basal nectary scale, gradually tapering to a short to long style with few to many ovules. The fruit is usually capsular with dehiscent follicles, opening along the carpal suture and many seeded. The seeds are small (1.5–3 mm), smooth, elongate, papillate to longitudinally ridged, and generally brownish.

However, a number of genera (e.g. Sempervivum, Aeonium) are polymerous (3-32), have basally fused or partially fused corolla segments, where the petals may form a corolla tube of varying length (e.g. Kalanchoe, Cotyledon), or have only a single whorl of 5 stamens (e.g. Crassula, Tillaea), while Sedum includes much of the morphological diversity within the family as a whole. Although the typical number of floral parts is four or five, a number of genera, such as Sempervivum and Jovibarba, demonstrate polymery (at least ten or greater parts).

=== Genome ===
The genome of Kalanchoë fedtschenkoi has been sequenced as a model to study the evolution of Crassulacean acid metabolism (CAM).

Chromosome numbers are highly variable. The original base chromosome number is x=8, decreasing to 7 in Crassula. In Sedoideae, the base number increases to 9 in the Kalanchoe clade, but Kalanchoe have x=17 or 18 (or a multiple), and is probably of polyploid origin, derived from a tetraploid Cotyledon like taxon. In the Telephium sensu Hart clade the base number has increased to 12 and higher. Of the subclades within Telephium, the first (Hylotelephium sensu Thiede & Eggli: Hylotelphium, Orostachys and Sinocrassula) has x=12, and of the Rhodiola clade Phedimus has x=16 and Umbilcus x=24, representing another episode of polyploidy. Within Sempervivum, Sedum series Rupestre (Petrosedum) has x=28. Within the Leucosedum, most taxa are diploid, with 2x=12, 14 but includes two subclades, one with x=6 or 7, the other x=6, but a few have 14 or 16. Acre includes a wide variety of chromosome numbers from x=6 to 270, and occasionally larger and displays widespread polyploidy. Aeonium includes some Sedum species with x=8, while the remaining taxa are x=18. The core of this clade is probably polyploid from an ancestor with x=8.

=== Phytochemistry ===
Crassulacean acid metabolism (CAM photosynthesis) is named after the family, because the pathway was first discovered in crassulacean plants. It is one of the few families that still has CAM as an active, photosynthetic pathway, and is unique in which all its members are known to possess CAM.

== Taxonomy ==
Originally described by Saint-Hilaire (1805) as Crassuleae, and therefore has his name as the botanical authority. Authority has also, at times, been given to De Candolle (DC), who first used the term "Crassulaceae" in 1815. He later placed the family among the Dicotyledons.

One of the most complete treatments was Alwin Berger's revision in 1930. At that time the family comprised about 1,500 species, distributed over six subfamilies and 33 genera. Circumscription of the family has remained relatively stable, with the exception of the placement of the genus Penthorum and Tetracarpaea, which has at times been placed either in their own monogeneric family, Penthoraceae and Tetracarpaeaceae, or in the Saxifragaceae. When Penthorum and Tetracarpaea were separated from Crassulaceae, they became a natural monophyletic group. Some later authors, such as Cronquist, included only 900 species. Thiede and Eggli (2007), in their treatment of the family, describe 34 genera with about 1,410 species. The size of the genera varies considerably, from Sedum, the largest with 300–500 species, to the smallest, which are monotypic. Estimates of the number of species has varied between 1500 (Berger 1930) and 900 (Cronquist 1981).

Molecular phylogenetics has shown that morphological characters and chromosome numbers are so labile in the family, with rampant polyploidy and aneuploidy, that they cannot be used reliably to infer evolution, even at low taxonomic levels, with few exceptions. For instance Prometheum and Rosularia have been segregated from Sedum by their basic chromosome numbers.

Crassulaceae is a medium size monophyletic grouping within the core eudicots. Originally considered a primitive member of the Rosidae, in the order Saxifragales, it is now placed, with that order as a superrosid under the classification system of the Angiosperm Phylogeny Group. There, the Saxifragales are a sister group to the rosids. Classification within the family is difficult and complex because many of the species hybridize readily, both in the wild and in cultivation, and the family is morphologically, cytologically and geographically diverse. As a result, generic boundaries have been considered unclear with frequent intergradation of characteristics between taxa, which may represent recurrent adaptation to xeric habitats.

=== Genera ===
39 genera are accepted.

- Adromischus Lem.
- Aeonium Webb & Berthel.
- Afrovivella A.Berger
- Aichryson Webb & Berthel.
- Chaloupkaea Niederle
- Chazaroa A.Vázquez, Padilla-Lepe & Rosales
- Chiastophyllum (Ledeb.) A.Berger
- Cotyledon L.
- Crassula L.
- Cremnophila Rose
- Dudleya Britton & Rose
- Echeveria DC.
- Graptopetalum Rose
- Hylotelephium H.Ohba
- Hypagophytum A.Berger
- Jeronimoa A.Vázquez, Islas & Rosales
- Kalanchoe Adans.
- Kungia K.T.Fu
- Lenophyllum Rose
- Meterostachys Nakai
- Monanthes Haw.
- Orostachys Fisch.
- Pachyphytum Link, Klotzsch & Otto
- Perrierosedum (A.Berger) H.Ohba
- Petrosedum Grulich
- Phedimus Raf.
- Pistorinia DC.
- Prometheum (A.Berger) H.Ohba
- Pseudosedum (Boiss.) A.Berger
- Quetzalcoatlia A.Vázquez, Rosales & Padilla-Lepe
- Rhodiola L.
- Rosularia (DC.) Stapf
- Sedum L.
- Sempervivum L.
- Sinocrassula A.Berger
- Thompsonella Britton & Rose
- Tylecodon Toelken
- Umbilicus DC.
- Villadia Rose

=== Phylogeny ===
Crassulaceae has been considered a part of the order Saxifragales by most modern authors, including Cronquist (1981), Takhtajan (1987), and Thorne (1992), based on phenotypic features, but subsequently confirmed by molecular methods. The place of Crassulaceae within Saxifragales has varied over time, as molecular data accumulates. The number of families within Saxifragales varies depending on the delimitation of individual families. Here, 14 families are shown in a cladogram, according to the Angiosperm Phylogeny Website, situating Crassulaceae as sister to the Haloragaceae sensu lato, and thus forming one of two subclades of the core Saxifragales.

Cladogram of Saxifragales showing the evolutionary affinities of Crassulaceae

- Saxifragales
  - Peridiscaceae
  - 97
    - - Paeonia (Paeoniaceae)
      - woody clade
        - Altingiaceae
        - 69
          - 98
            Hamamelidaceae
          - 95
            - Cercidiphyllum (Cercidiphyllaceae)
            - Daphniphyllum (Daphniphyllaceae)
    - core Saxifragales
      - - Crassulaceae
        - Haloragaceae s.l.
          - Aphanopetalum (Aphanopetalaceae)
          - - Tetracarpaea (Tetracarpaeaceae)
            - - Penthorum (Penthoraceae)
              - Haloragaceae s.s.
      - Saxifragaceae alliance
        - - Iteaceae (including Pterostemonaceae)
        - - Ribes (Grossulariaceae)
          - Saxifragaceae

This phylogenetic tree has been reconstructed with two different methods (maximum likelihood and Bayesian inference) from ca. 50,000 molecular characters, including plastid DNA, mitochondrial DNA, and nuclear DNA sequences. Monogeneric families are represented by genus names, with family in parentheses. Unless otherwise stated, support for most nodes is maximal and equal to 100%.

==== Biogeography and evolution ====
Crassulaceae evolved approximately 100–60 million years ago in southern Africa with the two most basal phylogenetic branches (Crassula, Kalanchoe) representing the predominantly southern African members. Other sources suggest that Crassulaceae evolved approximately 70 million years ago together with Haloragaceae sensu lato (Tetracarpaea, Penthorum, Haloragaceae). The family is considered to have had a gradual evolution, with a basal split between Crassuloideae and the rest of the family (Kalanchoideae, Sempervivoideae). The Sempervivoideae subsequently dispersed north to the Mediterranean region, and from there to Eastern Europe and Asia (Sempervivum and Leucosedum clades), with multiple groups spreading over the three continents of the Northern Hemisphere. Two lineages from the European Crassulaceae eventually dispersed to North America and underwent subsequent diversification. The Aeonium clade dispersed from northern Africa to adjacent Macaronesia.

Distinct centers of speciation developed in Macaronesia (Aeonium clade), Mexico (Sedum and Echeverioideae in clade 7), and southeastern Asia (Sedum sarmentosum, and S. morissonensis in Acre clade). On arrival in the Northern hemisphere the Sempervivoideae reached its greatest diversity. Conversely, few representatives of the Crassulaceae occur in South America and Australia. Sedum species are found in most of these regions, generally grouped with genera endemic to that region. For instance the North African S. jaccardianum and S. modestum (Aeonium) are a sister group to the endemic Macaronesian species in that clade. The Macaronesian archipelago appears to have been reached by Crassulaceae at least three times. Once by the ancestor of Aeonium and Monanthes, most likely from the Western Mediterranean region, with the closest extant relatives of these two genera (Sedum caeruleum, S. pubescens), coming from this region (Aeonium clade). The second migration was by an ancestor of a clade of three Sedum species (S. nudum, S. lancerotense and S. fusiforme (Acre clade)), which appear to have originated in Mexico. The third occurrence likely involved the ancestor of a lineage within the genus Umbilicus (Rhodiola clade). The Macronesian flora include three genera from the Sempervivoideae, Aeonium, Aichryson and Monanthes (Aeonium clade), together with several Sedum spp. and one species of Umbilicus (Rhodiola). North America was reached at least twice, once by an ancestor of Parvisedum and Dudleya, and once by a subclade of Acre. For a mapping of morphological features and biogeography on the phylogenetic tree, see Mort et al 2001 Fig. 3.

Chromosome numbers have played a limited role in elucidating evolution, but suggest a core of x=8, with subsequent polyploidy. For a mapping of chromosome numbers on the phylogenetic tree, see Mort et al 2001 Fig. 4.

=== Subdivision ===
==== History ====
When Carl Linnaeus published his Species Plantarum in 1753 only a few genera, included in the modern circumscription of Crassulaceae were described; the type genus Crassula (10 species), Tillaea (3), Cotyledon (6), Sempervivum (6), Rhodiola (1) and Sedum (15). By 1777, Rhodiola had been submerged into Sedum, only to be separated again in the twentieth century.

While the family can fairly easily be recognised, identifying its constituent genera has been far more problematic. For an extensive history of subfamily Sedoideae, see Ohba 1978. Saint-Hilaire's original description in 1805 included seven genera, as did De Candolle (1815). In a much more extensive treatment in 1828, he divided the Crassulaceae into the two groups, Isostemonae and Diplostemonae (i.e. haplostemony vs. obdiplostemony) on the basis of the number of staminal whorls. The former corresponded to the modern Crassuloideae. Two lineages, six subfamilies, and 33 genera of Crassulaceae were described by Berger in 1930:
Lineages, subfamilies, biogeography, No. genera, type genus (No. species in genus)

- Crassula (Southern hemisphere)
  - Crassuloideae S Africa 5 Crassula (300)
    - (Crassula, Dinacria, Rochea, Vauanthes, Pagella)
  - Kalanchiodeae S Africa, Madagascar 3 Kalanchoe (200)
    - (Kalanchöe, Bryophyllum, Kitchingia)
  - Cotyledonoideae S Africa, Mediterranean 6 Cotyledon (30)
    - (Cotyledon, Adromischus, Umbilicus, Chiastophyllum, Pistorina, Mucizonia)
- Sedum (Northern hemisphere)
  - Echeveroideae Mexico 5 Echeveria (150)
    - (Echeveria, Villadia, Altamiranoa, Pachyphytum, Lenophyllum)
  - Sempervivoideae Mediterranea, Macaronesia 5 Sempervivum (25)
    - (Sempervivum, Aeonium, Greenovia, Monanthes, Aichryson)
  - Sedoideae N hemisphere, S America, N & E Africa 11 Sedum (500)
    - (Sedum (since including Diamorpha), Rosularia, Orostachys, Pseudosedum, Hypagophytum, Afrovivella, Sempervivella, Sinocrassula)

Each of these contained one of the largest genera. Though various revisions since have proposed simpler schemes, such as Borisova (1939, revised 1969). Berger's classification has proven practical and been the most widely used, although some of the subfamilies are polyphyletic. Berger's classification depended on biogeography and a number of morphological characteristics (primarily the number and arrangement of floral parts (haplostemonous androecia, polymery), the degree of sympetaly, and phyllotaxis) which are now recognized as being of limited value due to extensive homoplasy, having evolved independently many times, and hence provides little useful information, only two of the subfamilies proving monophyletic. Berger used sympetaly to define the group of Kalanchiodeae, Cotyledonoideae and Echeveroideae, but it also occurs in taxa within Crassuloideae and Sedoideae. Berger also placed all species with polymery into his Sempervivoideae, but it occurs in two different clades, Sempervivum and Aeonium. Although five of his six subfamilies appeared to be morphologically and geographically defined, the Sedoideae were problematic, being an artificial construction containing all taxa which could not be fitted into the other subfamilies (catch-all).

Sedoideae contained three centres of diversity, East Asia, the Mediterranean region and North America, with the greatest in E. Asia. Only a few taxa, such as Rhodiola and Hylotelephium, occurring in all three regions. About 120 species were found in Europe and adjacent parts of North Africa and West Asia, and 400 in Eastern and central Asia.

Within Sedoideae, the large cosmopolitan typical genus Sedum (ca. 500 species), accounts for much of these issues, together with several smaller genera. Sedum refers to herbaceous, predominantly perennial species with alternate and entire leaves, a single subaxial hydathode and pentamerous obdiplostemous flowers with free petals. Most systematic treatments of the genus have resulted in conflicting classifications and evolutionary relationships within the Sedoideae. Attempts to resolve this have followed two opposing positions, lumping and splitting. Either accepting one artificial large catch-all polyphyletic genus, sensu lato (Sedum s.l.), or splitting it into many smaller genera, sensu stricto (Sedum s.l.). In the 1930s, Berger represented the splitting school of thought segregating genera such as Orostachys, Rosularia, Pseudosedum and Sempervivella. In contrast, Fröderströmm favoured retaining a broader construct of Sedum, recognising only Pseudosedum. In more recent times Ohba (1978) proposed the narrower view, segregating Rhodiola, Hylotelephium and Prometheum, among other genera. Ohba then subdivided the old world taxa of his now reduced Sedum into five subgenera:

- subgenus Aizoon
- subgenus Balfouria
- subgenus Spathulata
- subgenus Sedum
- subgenus Telmissa

Grulich (1984) continued this process, proposing Aizopsis (subgenus Aizoon), Asterosedum (subgenus Spathulata), Petrosedum (subgenus Sedum series Rupestria) and Oreosedum (subgenus Sedum series Alba) as separate genera. As many as 32 segregate genera have been published, and most Eurasian crassulacean species were originally included in Sedum, but subsequently segregated (see Sempervivoideae).

Subsequently, various revisions have proposed fewer subfamilies. Takhtajan (1987) initially submerged Sempervivoideae in Sedoideae and Cotyledonoideae in Kalanchiodeae to produce four, but later (1997) only three, Crassuloideae, Kalanchoideae and Sedoideae. Thorne (1992) also proposed three (Sedoidea, Cotyledonoidea, Crassuloidea), and then two (2000), Crassuloideae and Sempervivoideae.

==== Molecular phylogenetics ====
Prior to the use of molecular methods of classification, attempts to replace Berger's system were largely unsuccessful. Subsequently, Hart and colleagues (Note: Hendrik (Henk) t' Hart 1944–July 2000. Division of Plant Ecophysiology, Utrecht University) (1995) proposed two subfamilies, based on molecular phylogenetic data with chloroplast DNA, based on 49 species in 26 genera, which identified seven clades, named for constituent genera or species. Hart utilized a hierarchical system of subfamilies, tribes and subtribes, based on molecular, geographical and morphological criteria, including embryology, pollen morphology and phytochemistry.

- Subfamily Crassuloideae Berger Type: Crassula 2 South African genera (250 species)
- Subfamily Sedoideae Berger Type: Sedum
  - Tribe Kalanchoeae 't Hart Type: Kalanchoe 5 S African genera (250 spp.)
  - Tribe Sedeae 't Hart Type: Sedum
    - Subtribe Telephiinae 't Hart Type: Hylotelephium 8 Asian genera (150 spp.)
    - Subtribe Sedinae 't Hart Type: Sedum 18 Northern hemisphere genera (700 spp.)

The basal split at subfamily level, separates the haplostemonous (single series of stamens, equal in number to petals) African Crassuloideae with opposite leaves, from the Sedeae without these characteristics (obdiplostemonous, two whorls of stamens, twice as many as petals).

These clades were (1–7):

1. Crassula/Crassuloideae, the basal divergence, corresponds to Berger's subfamily of that name and are haplostemonous, but this feature is homoplasious. Confined to southern Africa, except for aquatic species, which are cosmopolitan.
2. Kalanchoe/Kalanchoeae, the second divergence, corresponds to Berger's Kalanchoideae (Kalanchoe, Bryophyllum, Kitchingia) and the 2 S. African members of Cotyledonoideae (Adromischus, Cotyledon), together with Tylecodon which was segregated from Cotyledon in 1978. It was characterized by 4- or 5-merous flowers, connate petals and seeds, together with leaves that are flat, crenate or dentate (toothed), often petiolate and decussate. Chromosome number x=9. Within the clade, Adromischus forms the basal divergence, followed by Cotyledon/Tylecodon as sister to Kalanchoe.
3. Telephium/Telephiinae include members of Cotyledonoideae (Umbilicus), together with some Sedoideae genera (including Hylotelephium) and two of Ohba's five subgenera of Sedum (Aizoon and Spathulata) and are usually obdiplostemonous, 5-merous flowers with free petals, flat and often crenate or dentate leaves ("flat leaved Asian Sedum") and have tubers, tuberous roots or woody or thickened rhizomes (monopodial or sympodial). In this respect many species share leaf features with the Kalanchoeae and Hart considered that the Telephiinae "bridge the gap" between the African Kalanchoeae and the Northern hemisphere Sedinae. Distribution predominantly East Asia, with Umbilicus being Mediterranean.
4. Sempervivum includes the montane/alpine Eurasian Sempervivum, its nominative genus, together with Sedum from the same region, including Sedum series Rupestria. Sempervivum is closely related to Jovibarba, which some authors place within the former genus.
5. Leucosedum, i.e. "White Sedum", from Sedum album, is polygeneric and includes additional Cotyledonoideae and Eurasian Sedoideae, including Sedum album and other species of Sedum subgenus Gormania. The other genera are thought to have evolved from the Sedum lineage in this clade, including Dudleya and Sedella (N America) and Rosularia, Prometheum and Pistorina (Eurasia). This grouping of 5–7 genera accounts for about 200 species. Some Sedum subgenus Sedum species also place here. Leucosedum species are found throughout the arid southwest United States and Mexico, as well as Eurasia.
6. Aeonium is predominantly Macaronesian Sempervivoideae (Aeonium, Aichryson, Greenovia and Monanthes), from a N African ancestor, and N. African Sedum. Berger grouped the genera of that subfamily on the basis of polymerous flowers, but this is not restricted to this clade.
7. Acre, with about 7 genera and 500 species is the most taxon rich clade in the Crasulaceae. It includes the American subfamily Echeveroideae and Sedum from Asia, Europe and Macaronesia, Mexico and Africa, including Sedum acre and Sedum subgenus Sedum. The strong representation of Sedum in this large clade accounts for it comprising a third of the diversity of the family. Two subclades consist of the N American and Macaronesian taxa, the other Eurasian.

The last subtribe, the Sedinae, represents the last four clades (4–7) and contained half of the genera and species of Crassulaceae, including Sedum, which is represented in all four clades, and the bulk of clades 5 and 7. In addition to Sedum, 16 other genera are recognised. Aeonium is basal divergence, followed by Sempervivum, with Leucosedum and Acre as sister groups. The Sedinae were very diverse, making phenotypic circumscription impossible. A similar problem exists for each of its subclades. Given the realisation that Sedum s.l. was a highly artificial construction, there was support for reducing it by describing a number of segregate genera. Ohba (1995) proposed that Sedum s.s. should be restricted to clade 7, or at most clades 5–7, continuing some of the premolecular work in this direction, newly describing a number of Asian genera in addition to this reduced Sedum.:

- Hylotelephium
- Orostachys
- Aizopsis
- Phedimus
- Rhodiola
- Prometheum
- Rosularia
- Balfouria
- Sinocrassula
- Meterostachys
- Pseudosedum

The general phylogenetic topology described by 't Hart et al. (1995) was confirmed in a larger study of 112 species of Crassulaceae sampled from 33 genera, and all six recognized subfamilies, using the chloroplast gene matK. The Telephium clade, which had only been weakly supported, was seen as probably containing several subclades. A similar conclusion was seen in a further but more focussed study of East Asian Sedoideae that examined the internal transcribed spacer (ITS) region of nuclear ribosomes of 74 taxa. This region includes about 300 species of Sedoideae, and most genera segregated from Sedum. However the Telephium clade of Ham was recognised as actually consisting of four separate clades, of which the two largest were named Hylotelephium and Rhodiola. The former are distinguished by being autumn flowering, while the remaining Sedeae bloom in spring and early summer. This analysis also confirmed the separate identity of most of the genera previously segregated from Sedum. A second ITS study of 69 taxa in ten Asian genera resolved Telephium into just these two larger clades.

Comparison of Infrafamilial Classifications of Crassulaceae
Clade^{1}	Hart 1995			Thiede & Eggli 2007	
	Subfamily	Tribe	Subtribe	Subfamily	Tribe
1. Crassula	Crassuloideae			Crassuloideae	
2. Kalanchoe	Sedoideae	Kalanchoeae		Kalanchoideae	
3. Telephium; Hylotelephium^{2}	Sedoideae	Sedeae	Telephiinae	Sempervivoideae	Telephieae
Rhodiola^{3}	Sedoideae	Sedeae	Telephiinae	Sempervivoideae	Umbiliceae
4. Sempervivum	Sedoideae	Sedeae	Sedinae	Sempervivoideae	Semperviveae
6. Aeonium	Sedoideae	Sedeae	Sedinae	Sempervivoideae	Aeonieae
5. Leucosedum	Sedoideae	Sedeae	Sedinae	Sempervivoideae	Sedeae
7. Acre	Sedoideae	Sedeae	Sedinae	Sempervivoideae	Sedeae
Notes: 1. Clade numbers following van Ham, order following phylogeny of Thiede & Eggli; 2. Thiede & Eggli renamed clade Telephium to Hylotelephium; 3. Rhodiola and Umbilicus were included in Telephium by Hart, but formed a separate clade, Rhodiola, in Thiede & Eggli, making an eighth clade.

Hart's taxonomic classification was revised by Thiede and Eggli (2007) to define three molecularly defined subfamilies, corresponding to the major clades, Crassuloideae, Kalanchoöideae and Sempervivoideae, and 34 genera. Although some authors prefer the older term Sedoideae for Sempervivoideae, Sempervivoideae has taxonomic priority. The earliest branching subfamily is the Crassuloideae (2 genera), followed by the Kalanchoöideae (4 genera). Both of these represent the genera of southern Africa. The remaining six clades are segregated into the five tribes of the large temperate climate subfamily Sempervivoideae, with about thirty genera. These are Telephiae, Umbilicicae, Semperviveae, Aeonieae and Sedeae. Sedeae is the largest of these and contains two sister clades, Leucosedum and Acre. The Sempervivoideae contain many familiar horticultural plants, such as Sedum. The phylogenetic relationships between the subfamilies are shown in the cladogram.

Cladogram of Crassulaceae subfamilies

- Crassulaceae
  - Crassuloideae
  - - Kalanchoöideae
    - Sempervivoideae

==== Subfamilies ====
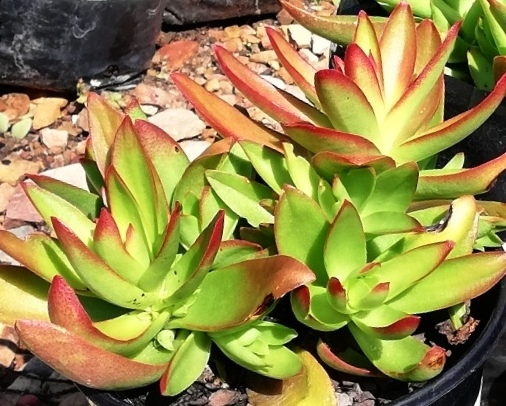
Crassula capitella

===== Crassuloideae Burnett =====
Crassuloideae is the smallest subfamily, representing a single monophyletic clade (Crassula), defined by haplostemonous androecia (characterized by a single whorl of stamens, the number of which equals the number of sepals, petals and carpels, and alternating with the petals). Although cosmopolitan in distribution, the center of diversity is southern Africa, with only the aquatic species being found more widely. It consists of two genera and about 250–300 species (Berger's other four genera (Dinacria, Pagella, Rochea, Vauanthes) having been subsumed into a larger Crassula s.l.). Crassula is morphologically diverse and up to 20 sections based on phenotypic features have been described. One of these, Tillaea, has at times been considered a separate genus. Hypagophytum is a monotypic genus, alternatively considered under Sempervivoideae.

- Crassula L. (including Tillaea L.) c. 200 spp.
- Hypagophytum A.Berger 1 sp.

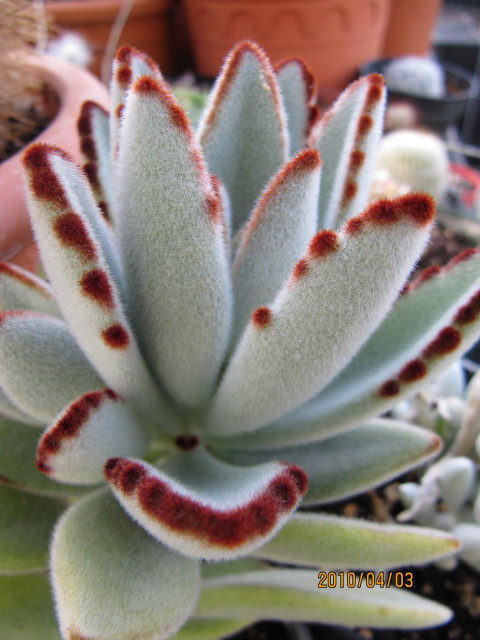
Kalanchoe tomentosa

===== Kalanchoöideae A.Berger =====
Kalanchoöideae is the next smallest subfamily, characterised by flower parts in fours. It represents Berger's Kalanchiodeae and Cotyledonoideae, in part. It is distributed in Madagascar and tropical Africa, with four genera and about between 130–240 species. It is characterised by fused corollas, chromosome number x=9 and mostly southern African distribution. The boundaries between Kalanchoe, Bryophyllum and Kitchingia have remained unclear, and the latter two genera are more commonly treated as sections of Kalanchoe:

- Adromischus Lem.
- Cotyledon L.
- Kalanchoe Adans. (including Bryophyllum Adans., Kitchingia Adans.)
- Tylecodon Toelken

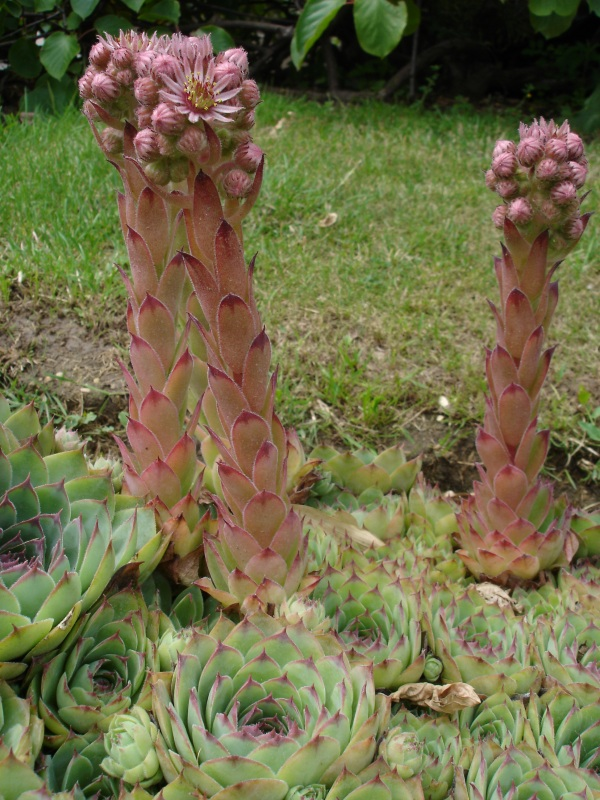
Sempervivum tectorum

===== Sempervivoideae Arn. =====
Sempervivoideae is the largest and taxonomically most complex subfamily, distributed in temperate climates, with about 20–30 genera, and divided into five tribes, of which Sedeae contains two distinct clades, Leucosedum and Acre:

- Telephieae
- Umbiliceae
- Semperviveae
- Aeonieae
- Sedeae

== Distribution and habitat ==
The family Crassulaceae has a cosmopolitan distribution, particularly Crassula, though rare in South America and Australia, predominantly in the temperate and subtropical regions of the Northern hemisphere and Africa. The main centers of diversity being Mexico and south-western USA (about 300 species), Southern Africa (about 250 species), the Mediterranean region (about 177 species) and adjacent Macaronesia archipelago (200 species), and south-eastern Asia (about 200 species), especially the Himalayas. The Mediterranean region includes 12 genera. The greatest diversity is in southern Africa and Madagascar where the Crassula and Kalanchoe clades are confined.

=== Habitat ===
Crassulaceae are found predominantly in semi-arid rocky habitats with monsoonal patterns of precipitation and high humidity, while some genera (e.g. Sempervivum) occur primarily in arid mountainous habitats and higher altitudes. Although their succulent leaves and Crassulacean acid metabolism allow them to adapt to a variable water supply, they are not found in true desert areas. Some lineages have adapted to semi-aquatic and seasonally aquatic areas (Crassula, Tillaea, Sedella) while Echeveria and Aichryson are found in moist, cool forest areas.

== Ecology ==
While most Crassulaceae are perennial, Tillaea are annuals, and annual species are also found among Aichryson, Crassula, Sedum and Monanthes.

== Cultivation ==
Many Crassulaceae species are cultivated as pot plants or in rock gardens and borders.

== Toxicity ==
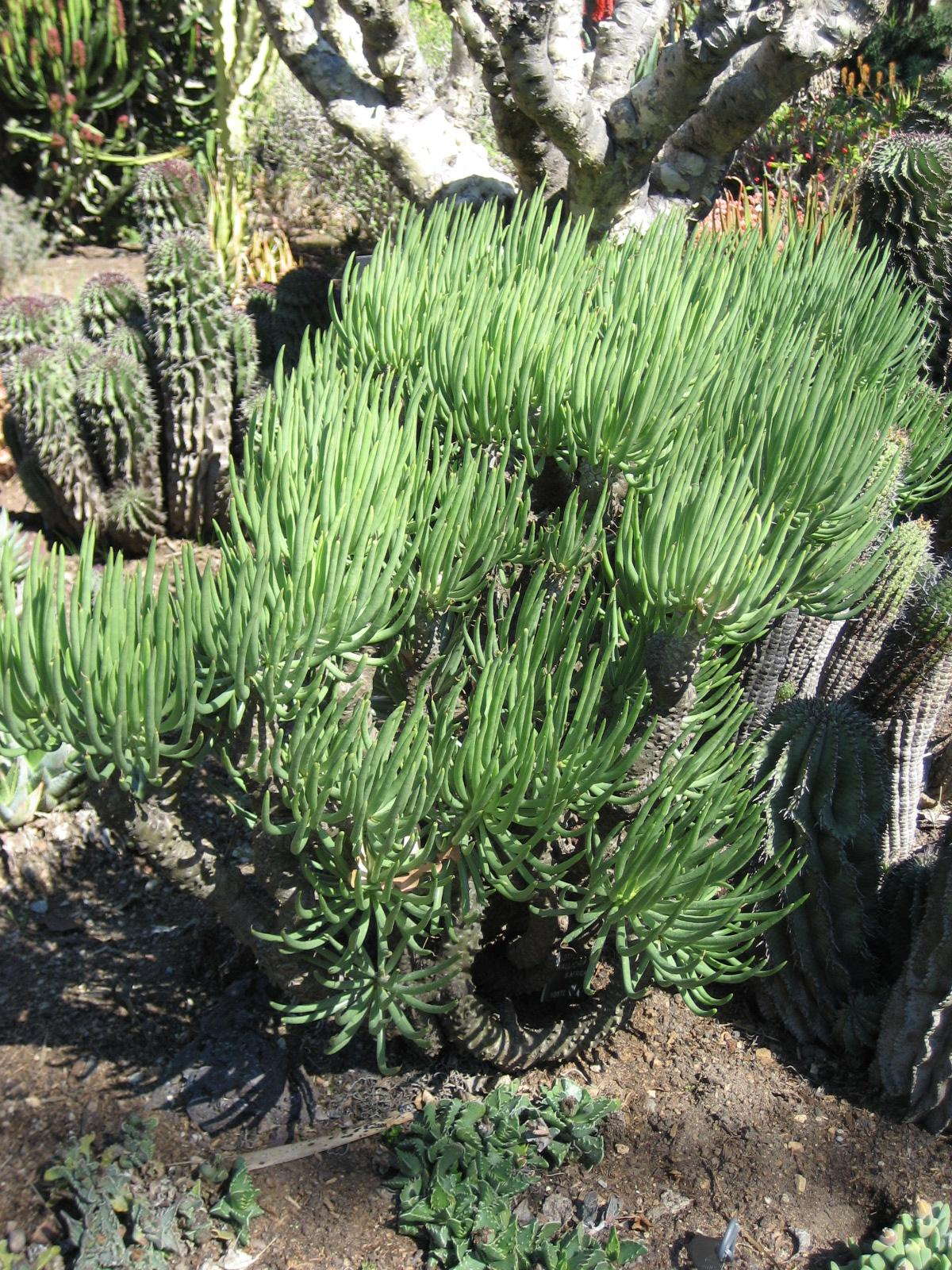
Tylecodon wallichii

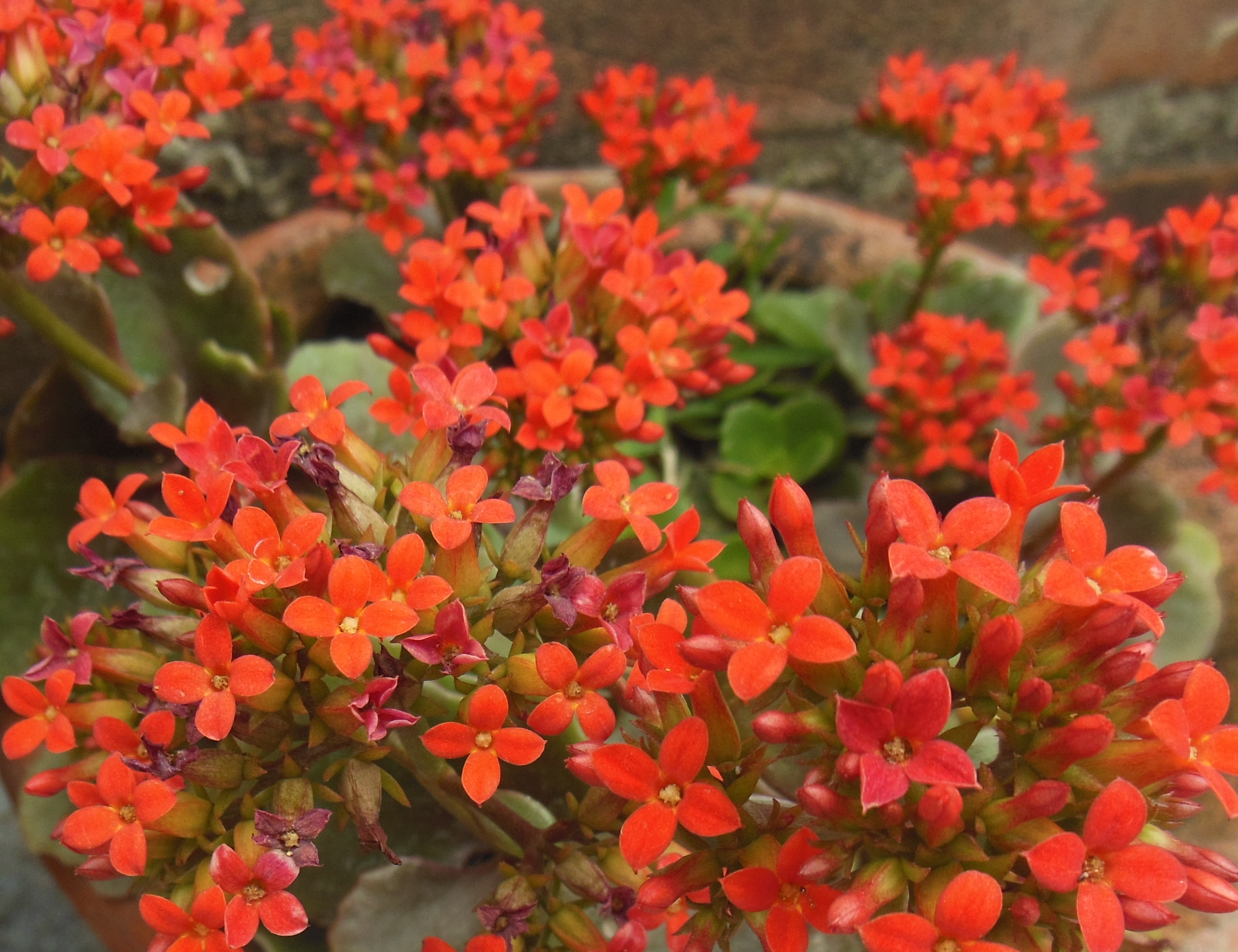
Kalanchoe blossfeldiana

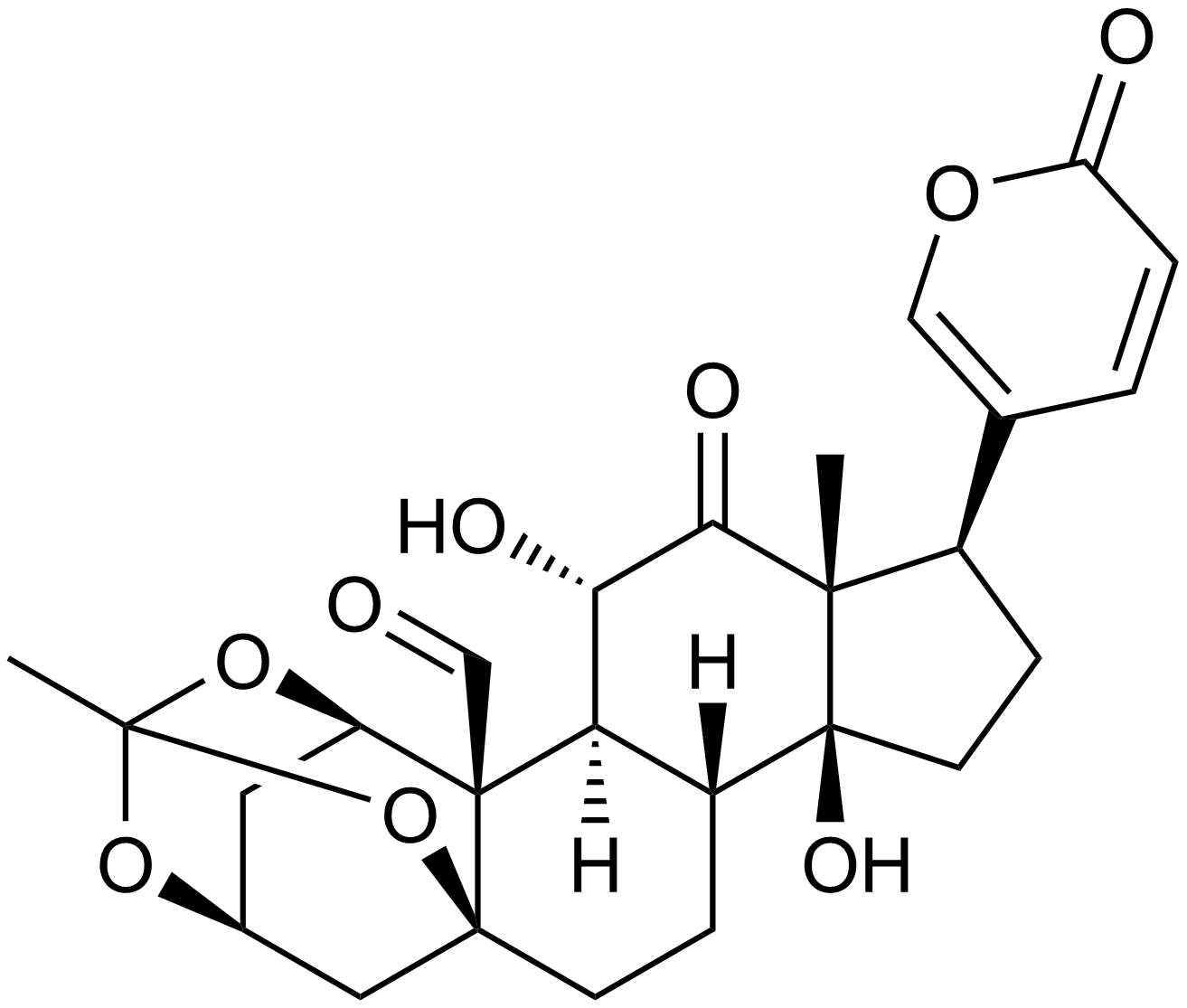
Chemical structure of the steroid orthoester daigremontianin

Members of the genera Cotyledon, Tylecodon and Kalanchoe contain potentially fatal digoxin-like steroids and should therefore be kept out of the reach of children and pets.

== Uses ==
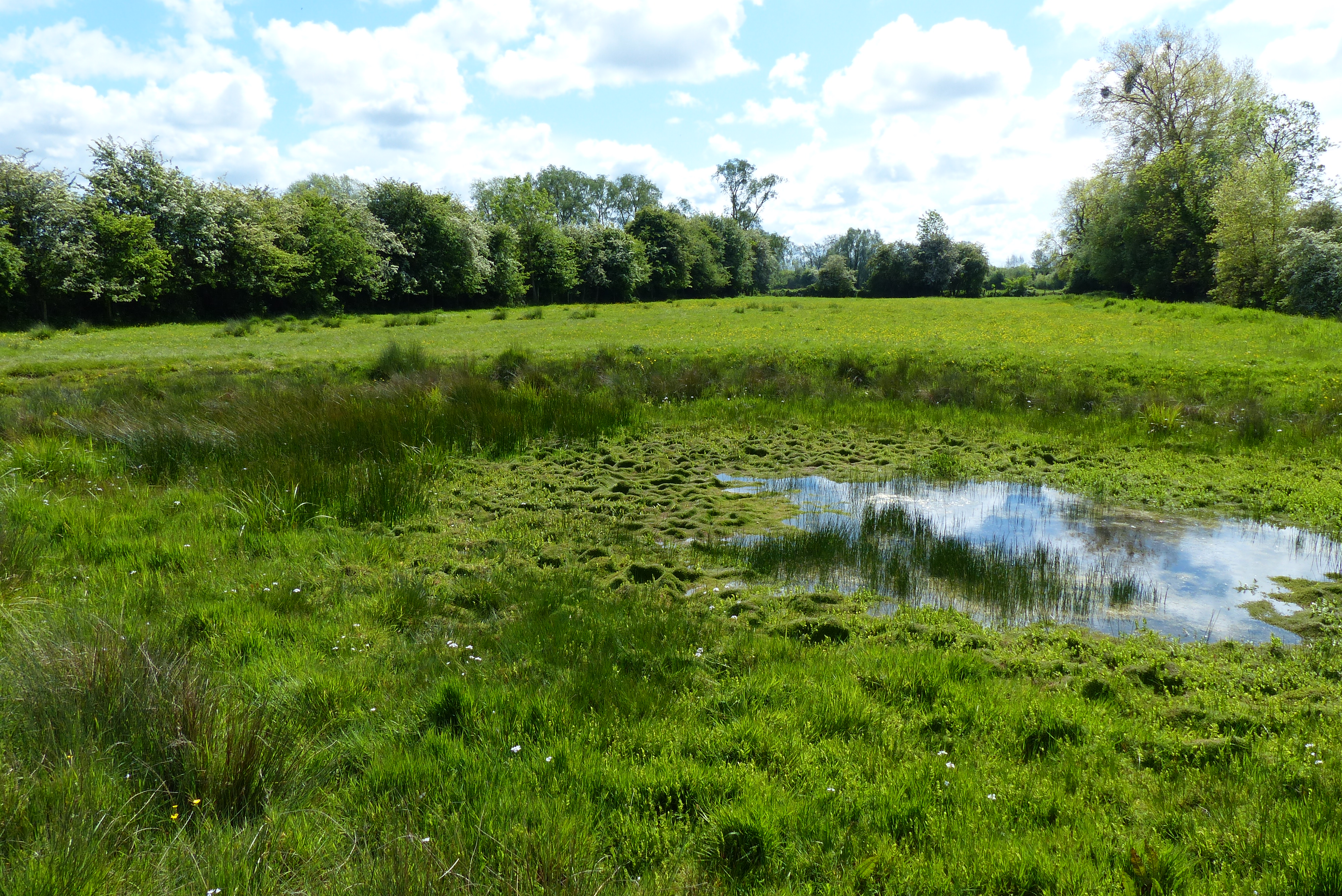
Crassula helmsii growing in wetland

Although no species have a role as crops, they are popular horticultural commodities as ornamental plants e.g. Kalanchoe, while others (e.g. Crassula helmsii) may also have a nuisance role as weeds.

== Bibliography ==
=== Books ===
- Borisova, AG (1939). "Crassulaceae D.C.". In Komarov, VL (ed.). Flora of the U.S.S.R. IX Rosales and Sarraceniales. Translated by Israel Program for Scientific Translations. Moskva: Botanicheskii institut Akademiia Nauk SSSR [Botanical Institute of the Academy of Sciences USSR]. pp. 8–105, addenda 357–372.
- Christenhusz, Maarten J. M.; Fay, Michael F.; Chase, Mark W. (2017). "Saxifragales". Plants of the World: An Illustrated Encyclopedia of Vascular Plants. University of Chicago Press. pp. 231–244. ISBN 978-0-226-52292-0.
- Cronquist, Arthur (1981). An integrated system of classification of flowering plants. New York: Columbia University Press. ISBN 978-0-231-03880-5.
- Eggli, Urs; Newton, Leonard E. (2004). Etymological Dictionary of Succulent Plant Names. Springer Science & Business Media. ISBN 978-3-540-00489-9.
- Eggli, Urs, ed. (2003). Illustrated Handbook of Succulent Plants: Crassulaceae. Springer Science & Business Media. doi:10.1007/978-3-642-55874-0. ISBN 978-3-642-55874-0. S2CID 36280482.
- Fröderströmm, Harald (1935). The Genus Sedum L.: a systematic essay. Meddelanden från Göteborgs botaniska trädgärd vol. 7. Elander Boktryckeri Aktiebolag.
- Hart, H. 't; Eggli, U., eds. (1995). Evolution and systematics of the Crassulaceae (23rd Congress of the International Organization for Succulent Plant Study, Wageningen, Netherlands, August 20th, 1994). Leiden: Backhuys. ISBN 978-90-73348-46-2. OCLC 34335028.
- Mitchell, John; Rook, Arthur James (1979). "Crassulaceae". Botanical Dermatology: Plants and Plant Products Injurious to the Skin. Greengrass. p. 226. ISBN 978-0-88978-047-7.
- Peterson, Michael E.; Talcott, Patricia A. (2012). Small Animal Toxicology. Elsevier Health Sciences. ISBN 978-1-4557-0717-1.
- Smith, Gideon F.; Figueiredo, Estrela; Wyk, Abraham E. van (2019). Kalanchoe (Crassulaceae) in Southern Africa: Classification, Biology, and Cultivation. Elsevier Science. ISBN 978-0-12-814008-6.
- Takhtajan, A. (1987). Sistema Magnoliofitov (Systema Magnoliophytorum) (in Russian). Leningrad: Nauka.
- Thiede, J; Eggli, U (2007). "Crassulaceae". In Kubitzki, Klaus (ed.). Berberidopsidales, Buxales, Crossosomatales, Fabales p.p., Geraniales, Gunnerales, Myrtales p.p., Proteales, Saxifragales, Vitales, Zygophyllales, Clusiaceae Alliance, Passifloraceae Alliance, Dilleniaceae, Huaceae, Picramniaceae, Sabiaceae. Springer. pp. 83–119. ISBN 978-3-540-32214-6. (full text at ResearchGate)
- Wiersema, John H.; León, Blanca (2016) [1999]. World Economic Plants: A Standard Reference (2nd ed.). CRC Press. ISBN 978-1-4665-7681-0.

==== Chapters ====
- Gwaltney-Brant, Sharon M. (2012). Christmastime Plants. pp. 419–512., in Peterson & Talcott (2012)
- Hart, H. 't; Eggli, U. (1995). Introduction. pp. 7–15., in Hart & Eggli (1995)
- Hart, H. 't (1995). Infrafamilial and generic classification of the Crassulaceae. pp. 159–172., in Hart & Eggli (1995)
- Ohba, Hideaki (1995). Systematic problems of Asian Sedoideae. pp. 151–158., in Hart & Eggli (1995)
- van Ham, R.C.H.J. (1995). Phylogenetic relationships in the Crassulaceae inferred from chloroplast DNA variation. pp. 16–29., in Hart & Eggli (1995)

==== Historical ====
- Berger, A. (1930). "Crassulacaeae". In Engler, Adolf; Prantl, Karl Anton (eds.). Die Natürlichen Pflanzenfamilien. Vol. 18A. Leipzig: Verlag von Wilhelm Engelmann. pp. 352–483.
- Borisova, AG (1969). "Conspectus Systematis Fam. Crassulaceae D.C. Florae URSS". Novit. Syst. Pl. Vasc. Acad. Sci. USSR. 6: 112–121.
- de Candolle, A. P. (1828). "Crassulaceae". Prodromus systematis naturalis regni vegetabilis, sive, Enumeratio contracta ordinum generum specierumque plantarum huc usque cognitarium, juxta methodi naturalis, normas digesta. Vol. 3. Paris: Treuttel et Würtz. pp. 381–414.
- de Lamarck; de Candolle (1815) [1805]. "Crassulaceae". Flore française ou descriptions succinctes de toutes les plantes qui croissent naturellement en France disposées selon une nouvelle méthode d'analyse; et précédées par un exposé des principes élémentaires de la botanique. Vol. 4 (3 ed.). Paris: Desray. pp. 382–398.
- Gray, Samuel Frederick (1821). "Crassulaceae". A natural arrangement of British plants: according to their relations to each other as pointed out by Jussieu, De Candolle, Brown, &c. 2 vols. London: Baldwin, Cradock, and Joy. pp. ii: 538–543.
- Linnaeus, Carl (1753). Species Plantarum: exhibentes plantas rite cognitas, ad genera relatas, cum differentiis specificis, nominibus trivialibus, synonymis selectis, locis natalibus, secundum systema sexuale digestas. Vol. 1. Stockholm: Impensis Laurentii Salvii. pp. 282–283, 128–129, 429–30, 464–465, 1035, 430–432., see also Species Plantarum
- Saint-Hilaire, Jean Henri Jaume (1805). "Crassuleae". Exposition des familles naturelles et de la germination des plantes, contentant la description de 2,337 genres et d'environ 4,000 espèces, 112 planches dont les figures ont été dessinées par l'auteur. vol II. Paris: Treuttel et Würtz. pp. 123–128.

=== Articles ===
- Anonymous (1937). "The Crassulaceae". The Cactus Journal. 5 (3): 51–53. ISSN 0950-7949. JSTOR 42784672.
- Christenhusz, Maarten J.M. & Byng, J.W. (2016). "The number of known plants species in the world and its annual increase". Phytotaxa. 261 (3). Magnolia Press: 201–217. Bibcode:2016Phytx.261..201C. doi:10.11646/phytotaxa.261.3.1.
- Grulich, Vit (1984). "Generic division of Sedoideae in Europe and the adjacent regions" (PDF). Preslia. 56: 29–45.
- Hart, H. 't; Koek-Noorman, J. (November 1989). "The origin of the woody Sedoideae (Crassulaceae)". Taxon. 38 (4): 535–544. Bibcode:1989Taxon..38..535H. doi:10.2307/1222628. JSTOR 1222628.
- Ohba, Hideaki (March 1977). "The taxonomic status of Sedum telephium and its allied species (Crassulaceae)". The Botanical Magazine Tokyo. 90 (1): 41–56. Bibcode:1977JPlR...90...41O. doi:10.1007/BF02489468. S2CID 22239507.
- Ohba, H (1978). "Generic and infrageneric classification of the old world sedoideae crassulaceae". Journal of the Faculty of Science University of Tokyo Section III Botany. 12 (4): 139–193.
- Thorne, Robert F. (1992). "Classification and Geography of the Flowering Plants". Botanical Review. 58 (3): 225–348. Bibcode:1992BotRv..58..225T. doi:10.1007/BF02858611. ISSN 0006-8101. JSTOR 4354190. S2CID 40348158.

==== Phylogeny ====
- Angiosperm Phylogeny Group (2016). "An update of the Angiosperm Phylogeny Group classification for the orders and families of flowering plants: APG IV". Botanical Journal of the Linnean Society. 181 (1): 1–20. doi:10.1111/boj.12385.
- Carrillo-Reyes, Pablo; Sosa, Victoria; Mort, Mark E. (October 2009). "Molecular phylogeny of the Acre clade (Crassulaceae): Dealing with the lack of definitions for Echeveria and Sedum" (PDF). Molecular Phylogenetics and Evolution. 53 (1): 267–276. Bibcode:2009MolPE..53..267C. doi:10.1016/j.ympev.2009.05.022. PMID 19482091. Archived from the original (PDF) on 2019-08-24.
- Gontcharova, S. B.; Artyukova, E. V.; Gontcharov, A. A. (June 2006). "Phylogenetic relationships among members of the subfamily Sedoideae (Crassulaceae) inferred from the ITS region sequences of nuclear rDNA" (PDF). Russian Journal of Genetics. 42 (6): 654–661. doi:10.1134/S102279540606010X. S2CID 33249840. Archived from the original (PDF) on 2017-08-09.
- Gontcharova, Svetlana B.; Gontcharov, Andrey A. (2007). "Molecular Phylogenetics of Crassulaceae" (PDF). Genes, Genomes and Genomics. 1 (1): 40–46.
- Gontcharova, S. B.; Gontcharov, A. A. (11 October 2009). "Molecular phylogeny and systematics of flowering plants of the family Crassulaceae DC". Molecular Biology. 43 (5): 794–803. doi:10.1134/S0026893309050112. S2CID 39602334.
- Hart, H. 't (1995a). "The evolution of the Sedum acre group (Crassulaceae)" (PDF). Bocconea. 5: 119–128.
- Hart, H.'t (1997). "Diversity within Mediterranean Crassulaceae" (PDF). Lagascalia. 1 (2): 93–100.
- Jian, Shuguang; Soltis, Pamela S.; Gitzendanner, Matthew A.; Moore, Michael J.; Li, Ruiqi; Hendry, Tory A.; Qiu, Yin-Long; Dhingra, Amit; Bell, Charles D.; Soltis, Douglas E. (February 2008). "Resolving an ancient, rapid radiation in Saxifragales". Systematic Biology. 57 (1): 38–57. doi:10.1080/10635150801888871. PMID 18275001.
- Mayuzumi, Shinzo; Ohba, Hideaki (2004). "The Phylogenetic Position of Eastern Asian Sedoideae (Crassulaceae) Inferred from Chloroplast and Nuclear DNA Sequences". Systematic Botany. 29 (3): 587–598. Bibcode:2004SysBo..29..587M. doi:10.1600/0363644041744329. ISSN 0363-6445. JSTOR 25063994. S2CID 84319808.
- Messerschmid, Thibaud F.E.; Klein, Johannes T.; Kadereit, Gudrun; Kadereit, Joachim W. (4 September 2020). "Linnaeus's folly – phylogeny, evolution and classification of Sedum (Crassulaceae) and Crassulaceae subfamily Sempervivoideae". Taxon. 69 (5): 892–926. Bibcode:2020Taxon..69..892M. doi:10.1002/tax.12316.
- Mort, Mark E.; Soltis, Douglas E.; Soltis, Pamela S.; Francisco-Ortega, Javier; Santos-Guerra, Arnoldo (January 2001). "Phylogenetic relationships and evolution of Crassulaceae inferred from matK sequence data". American Journal of Botany. 88 (1): 76–91. doi:10.2307/2657129. JSTOR 2657129. PMID 11159129.
- Mort, Mark E.; Levsen, Nicholas; Randle, Christopher P.; Van Jaarsveld, Ernst; Palmer, Annie (July 2005). "Phylogenetics and diversification of Cotyledon (Crassulaceae) inferred from nuclear and chloroplast DNA sequence data". American Journal of Botany. 92 (7): 1170–1176. doi:10.3732/ajb.92.7.1170. PMID 21646139.
- Mort, Mark E.; O'Leary, T. Ryan; Carrillo-Reyes, Pablo; Nowell, Tracey; Archibald, Jenny K.; Randle, Christopher P. (December 2010). "Phylogeny and evolution of Crassulaceae: Past, present, and future". Biodiversity & Ecology. 3: 69–86.
- Nikulin, Arthur; Nikulin, Vyacheslav; Gontcharov, Andrey (October 2015). "To the question of phylogenetic structure of the tribe Telephieae (Sempervivoideae, Crassulaceae) based on ITS rDNA sequence comparisons". Botanicheskii Zhurnal (in Russian). 100 (10): 1030–1040.
- Nikulin, Vyacheslav Yu.; Gontcharova, Svetlana B.; Stephenson, Ray; Gontcharov, Andrey A. (September 2016). "Phylogenetic relationships between Sedum L. and related genera (Crassulaceae) based on ITS rDNA sequence comparisons". Flora. 224: 218–229. Bibcode:2016FMDFE.224..218N. doi:10.1016/j.flora.2016.08.003.
- van Ham, Roeland C. H. J.; Hart, Henk 't (January 1998). "Phylogenetic relationships in the Crassulaceae inferred from chloroplast DNA restriction-site variation". American Journal of Botany. 85 (1): 123–134. doi:10.2307/2446561. JSTOR 2446561. PMID 21684886.
- Soltis, D. E.; Mort, M. E.; Latvis, M.; Mavrodiev, E. V.; O'Meara, B. C.; Soltis, P. S.; Burleigh, J. G.; Rubio de Casas, R. (29 April 2013). "Phylogenetic relationships and character evolution analysis of Saxifragales using a supermatrix approach". American Journal of Botany. 100 (5): 916–929. Bibcode:2013AmJB..100..916S. doi:10.3732/ajb.1300044. PMID 23629845.
- Tölken, H. (15 December 1978). "New taxa and new combinations in Cotyledon and allied genera". Bothalia. 12 (3): 377–393. Bibcode:1978Botha..12..377T. doi:10.4102/abc.v12i3.1794.

=== Websites ===
- Hosch, William L. (27 Jun 2008). Crassulaceae. Encyclopædia Britannica.
- Stevens, P.F. (2019) [2001]. "Crassulaceae". AP Web v. 14. Missouri Botanical Garden. (see also Angiosperm Phylogeny Website)
- Fu, Kunjun; Ohba, Hideaki; Gilbert, Michael G. (2004). "Crassulaceae Candolle". p. 202., in Flora of China online vol. 8
- Rosen, Ralph (5 April 2018). "Crassuloideae". The Cactus Expert: World of Succulents.
- "International Crassulaceae Network".
- Etter, Julia; Kristen, Martin (2019). "The Crassulaceae database".

==== Databases ====
- "The Plant List Version 1.1: Crassulaceae". The Plant List. Royal Botanic Gardens, Kew and Missouri Botanical Garden. 2013.
- "Crassulaceae J.St.-Hil". World Flora Online. 2019.
- "Crassulaceae J.St.-Hil". Plants of the World Online. Royal Botanic Gardens, Kew. 2019.
