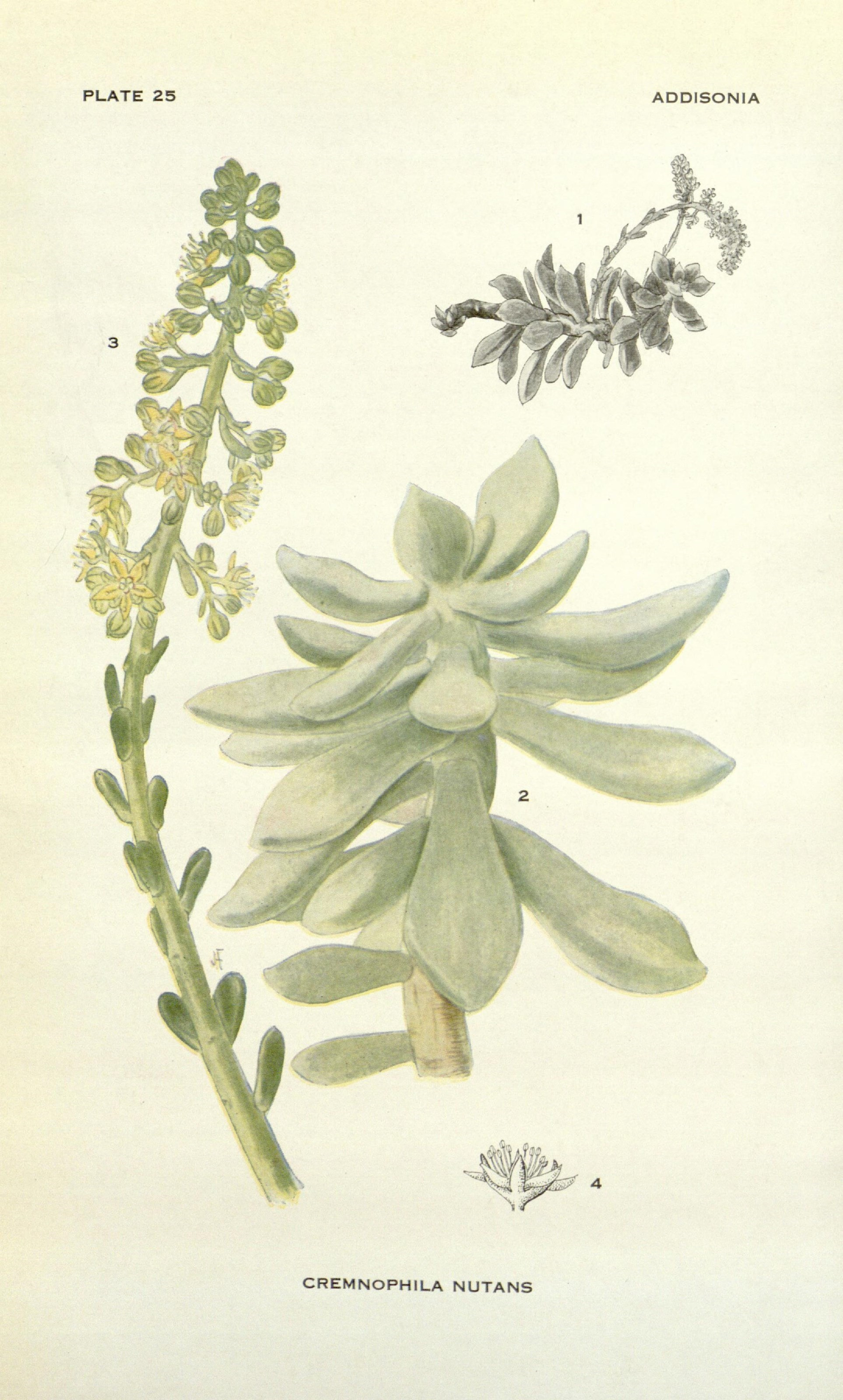
- Addisonia (PLATE 025)

Scientific classification
- Kingdom: Plantae
- Clade: Tracheophytes
- Clade: Angiosperms
- Clade: Eudicots
- Order: Saxifragales
- Family: Crassulaceae
- Genus: Cremnophila; Rose

= Cremnophila (plant) =

Genus of plants

Cremnophila is a genus of flowering plants belonging to the family Crassulaceae.

Its native range is Central Mexico.

== Species ==
Species:

- Cremnophila linguifolia (Lem.) Moran
- Cremnophila nutans Rose
- Cremnophila tlahuicana J.Reyes, Ávila & Brachet
