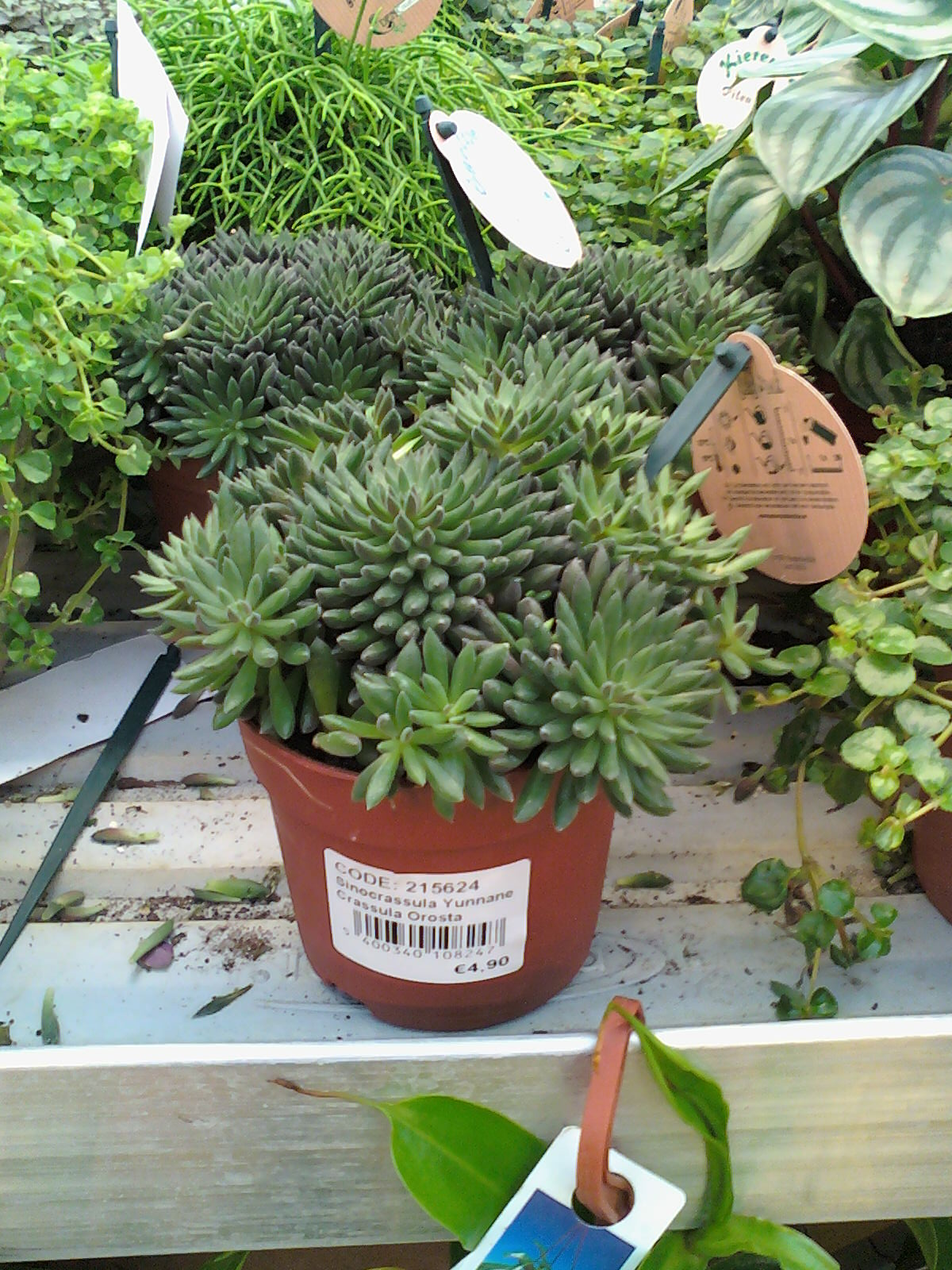
- Sinocrassula yunnanensis

Scientific classification
- Kingdom: Plantae
- Clade: Embryophytes
- Clade: Tracheophytes
- Clade: Angiosperms
- Clade: Eudicots
- Order: Saxifragales
- Family: Crassulaceae
- Genus: Sinocrassula; A.Berger

Species
- see text

= Sinocrassula =

Genus of flowering plants

Sinocrassula is a genus of succulent, subtropical plants of the family Crassulaceae.

The name "Sinocrassula" means "Chinese crassula". They come from the province Yunnan in the south of China, and also from the north of Burma. They grow at an altitude between 2,500 and 2,700 m.

== Species ==
- Sinocrassula ambigua (Praeger) A.Berger
- Sinocrassula bergeri H.Jacobsen
- Sinocrassula crassifolia Chen, C (2026)
- Sinocrassula densirosulata (Praeger) A.Berger
- Sinocrassula diversifolia H.Chuang
- Sinocrassula indica (Decne.) A.Berger
- Sinocrassula indica var. forrestii (Raym.-Hamet) S.H.Fu
- Sinocrassula indica var. luteorubra (Praeger) S.H.Fu
- Sinocrassula indica var. obtusifolia (Fröd.) S.H.Fu
- Sinocrassula indica var. serrata (Raym.-Hamet) S.H.Fu
- Sinocrassula jiaozishanensis Chao Chen, J.Guan Wang & Z.R.He
- Sinocrassula longistyla (Praeger) S.H.Fu
- Sinocrassula luteorubra (Praeger) H.Chuang
- Sinocrassula techinensis (S.H.Fu) S.H.Fu
- Sinocrassula vietnamensis (S.H.Fu) S.H.Fu
- Sinocrassula yongshengensis Chen, C (2026)
- Sinocrassula yunnanensis Aver. et V.V.Byalt

source: International Plant Names Index - Sinocrassula

== Description ==
Sinocrassula presents rosettes of thin fleshy triangular brown leaves. The plants are up to 20 cm (7.9 in) height.

They develop dense clumps. Sometimes, Sinocrassula shows monstrous forms.

The inflorescence is a dense panicle up to 10–15 cm (3.9–5.9 in) with whitish flowers and red-tipped petals.

== Cultivation ==
They need a well-drained soil, a sunny or lightly shaded exposure. They tolerate a more shaded location but grow less. They require moderate watering, with very little in winter. In a temperate climate, plants can be outside.

Division of plants and pruning are the easiest ways of multiplication. Seeding is also possible.
