= Perrierosedum =

Conservation status
- Critically Endangered (IUCN 3.1)

Scientific classification
- Kingdom: Plantae
- Clade: Embryophytes
- Clade: Tracheophytes
- Clade: Angiosperms
- Clade: Eudicots
- Order: Saxifragales
- Family: Crassulaceae
- Genus: Perrierosedum (A.Berger) H.Ohba
- Species: P. madagascariense

Binomial name
- Perrierosedum madagascariense (H.Perrier) H.Ohba

Synonyms
- Sedum madagascariense H.Perrier

Genus of plants

Perrierosedum is a genus of succulent plant in the family Crassulaceae containing only one species, Perrierosedum madagascariense. It is a critically endangered species endemic to Madagascar.

== Taxonomy and history ==
Sedum madagascariense was described by French botanist Joseph Marie Henry Alfred Perrier de la Bâthie in 1923. S. madagascariense was placed in Sedum section Perrierosedum, named in honour of Perrier de la Bâthie, in 1930 by Alwin Berger. Sedum sect. Perrierosedum would later be elevated to genus by Japanese botanist Hideaki Ohba in 1978, re-designating the species Perrierosedum madagascariense.

This species is known as maroatody in Malagasy.

== Distribution and habitat ==
Perrierosedum madagascariense is known only from Andringitra Massif in the Haute Matsiatra and Ihorombe regions of south-central Madagascar. It grows on rocky outcrops at altitudes of 1,600 m (5,200 ft) to 2,659 m (8,724 ft).

== Description ==
Perrierosedum madagascariense is a small perennial shrub growing 50–80 cm (20–31 in) tall. The branches are hairless and quadrangular. The fleshy leaves are sessile, borne opposite one another, measuring 2.5–5 cm (0.98–1.97 in) by 1.5–2.5 cm (0.59–0.98 in) with finely toothed margins. The inflorescence is a terminal corymbose cyme bearing three to ten flowers. The flowers measure approximately 10 mm (0.39 in) across and are hexamerous or, rarely, pentamerous. The petals are white with a red to orange tint and purple veins.

== Conservation status ==
Perrierosedum madagascariense is listed as critically endangered on the International Union for the Conservation of Nature's Red List under criterion B2ab(iii), based on its small area of occupancy and the decline of its habitat. It is known only from a single location within Andringitra National Park, and the size of the population is unknown. Despite occurring within a protected area, it is threatened by wildfires, grazing, and human disturbance from hikers and rock climbers.

This species has been planted at the Botanical and Zoological Garden of Tsimbazaza in Antananarivo, Madagascar.
