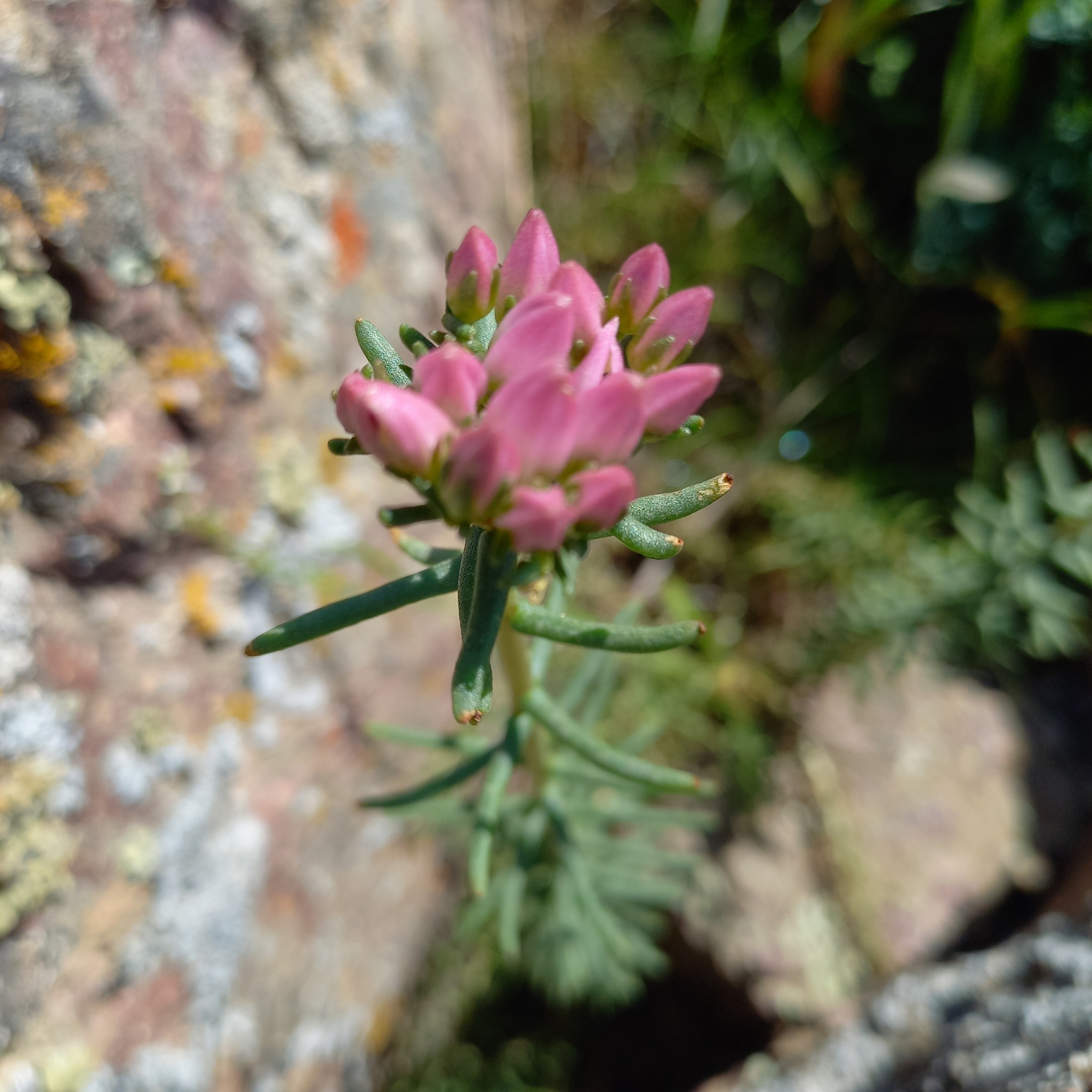
- Pseudosedum longidentatum in Kazakhstan

Scientific classification
- Kingdom: Plantae
- Clade: Tracheophytes
- Clade: Angiosperms
- Clade: Eudicots
- Order: Saxifragales
- Family: Crassulaceae
- Subfamily: Sempervivoideae
- Tribe: Umbiliceae
- Genus: Pseudosedum (Boiss.) A.Berger

= Pseudosedum =

Genus of flowering plants

Pseudosedum is a genus of flowering plants in the family Crassulaceae native to Central Asia and Siberia.

== Species ==
Species in the genus include:

- Pseudosedum acutisepalum C.-A.Jansson
- Pseudosedum affine (Schrenk) A.Berger
- Pseudosedum bucharicum Boriss.
- Pseudosedum campanuliflorum Boriss.
- Pseudosedum condensatum Boriss.
- Pseudosedum fedtschenkoanum Boriss.
- Pseudosedum ferganense Boriss.
- Pseudosedum kamelinii Palanov
- Pseudosedum karatavicum Boriss.
- Pseudosedum koelzii C.-A.Jansson
- Pseudosedum kuramense Boriss.
- Pseudosedum lievenii (Ledeb.) A.Berger
- Pseudosedum longidentatum Boriss.
- Pseudosedum multicaule (Boiss. & Buhse) Boriss.

== Ecology ==
It is an important host for the larva of the Central Asian butterfly Parnassius apollonius.
