= Molecular Biology (journal) =

- Discipline: Molecular biology, cellular biology
- Language: English, Russian

Publication details
- Publisher: Nauka, Springer Science+Business Media

Standard abbreviations
- ISO 4: Mol. Biol. (N.Y.)
- NLM: Mol Biol

Indexing
- Molecular Biology
- CODEN: MOLBBJ
- ISSN: 0026-8933 (print); 1608-3245 (web)
- OCLC no.: 00819101
- Molekulyarnaya Biologiya
- ISSN: 0026-8984 (print); 3034-5553 (web)

Links
- Journal homepage; @ Springer

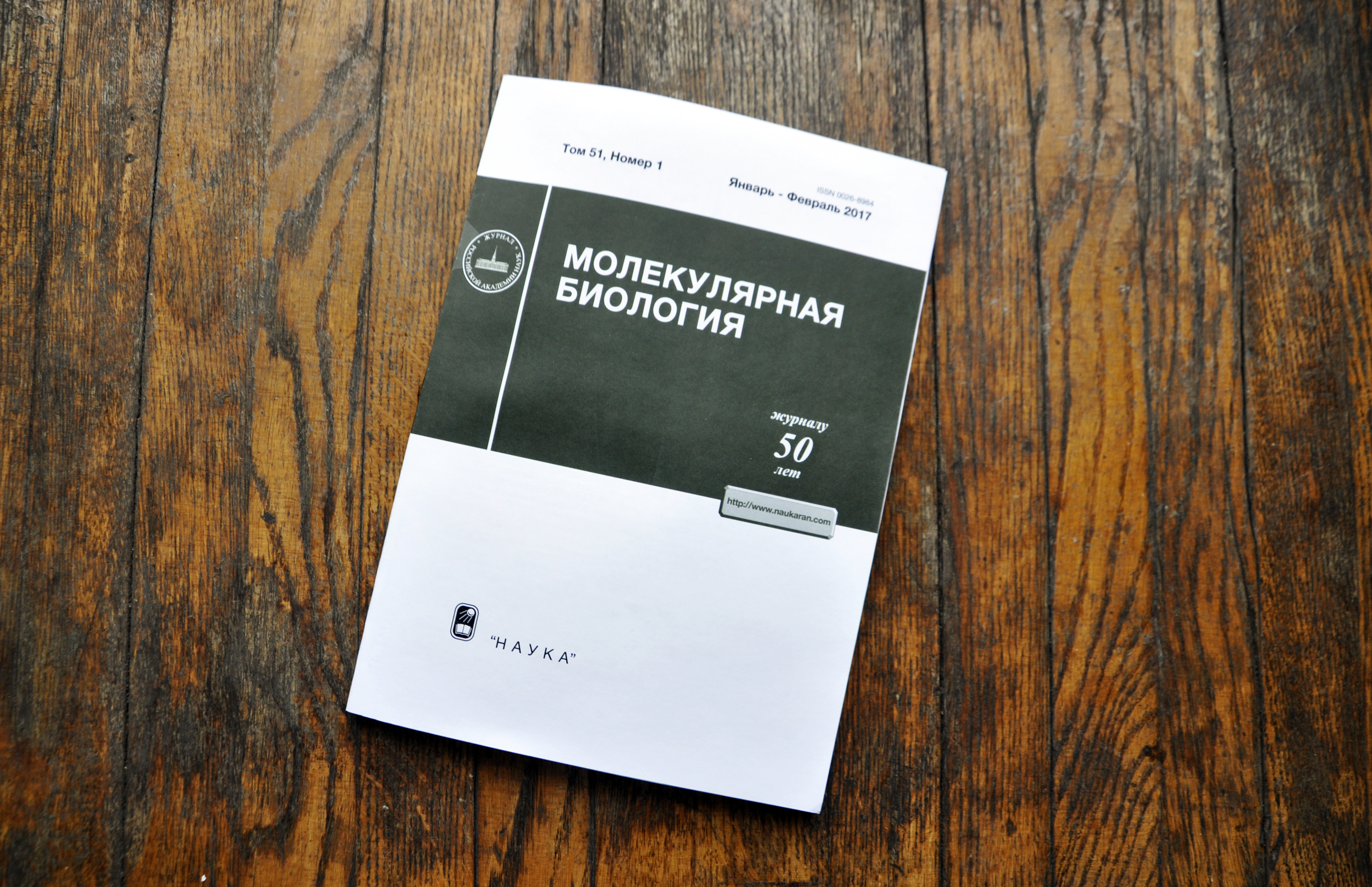
A Russian edition of the journal

Molecular Biology (Russian: Молекулярная биология, romanized: Molekulyarnaya Biologiya) is a scientific journal which covers a wide scope of problems related to molecular, cell, and computational biology including genomics, proteomics, bioinformatics, molecular virology and immunology, molecular development biology, and molecular evolution. Molecular Biology publishes reviews, mini-reviews, experimental, and theoretical works, short communications and hypotheses. In addition, the journal publishes book reviews and meeting reports. The journal also publishes special issues devoted to most rapidly developing branches of physical-chemical biology and to the most outstanding scientists on the occasion of their anniversary birthdays. The journal is published in English and Russian versions by Nauka.
