= Kungia =

Scientific classification
- Kingdom: Plantae
- Clade: Tracheophytes
- Clade: Angiosperms
- Clade: Eudicots
- Order: Saxifragales
- Family: Crassulaceae
- Genus: Kungia; K.T.Fu

Species
- See text.

Genus of succulents

Kungia is a genus of Crassulaceae that contains 2 accepted species. It is a perennial herb growing in China (Gansu, Shaanxi, Sichuan).

== Species ==
- Kungia aliciae (Raym.-Hamet) K.T. Fu
- Kungia schoenlandii (Raym.-Hamet) K.T. Fu
