= Meterostachys =

Scientific classification
- Kingdom: Plantae
- Clade: Tracheophytes
- Clade: Angiosperms
- Clade: Eudicots
- Order: Saxifragales
- Family: Crassulaceae
- Genus: Meterostachys; Nakai
- Species: M. sikokiana

Binomial name
- Meterostachys sikokiana (Makino) Nakai

Synonyms
- Cotyledon sikokiana Makino; Merostachys Nakai; Sedum leveilleanum Raym.-Hamet; Sedum oriento-asiaticum Makino ex A. Bgr.; Sedum sikokianum Raym.-Hamet

Genus of succulents

Meterostachys is a genus of plants in the family Crassulaceae, that contains a single accepted species, Meterostachys sikokiana, native to Japan and Korea. It is little known and is difficult to cultivate.
