= Flora of Taiwan =

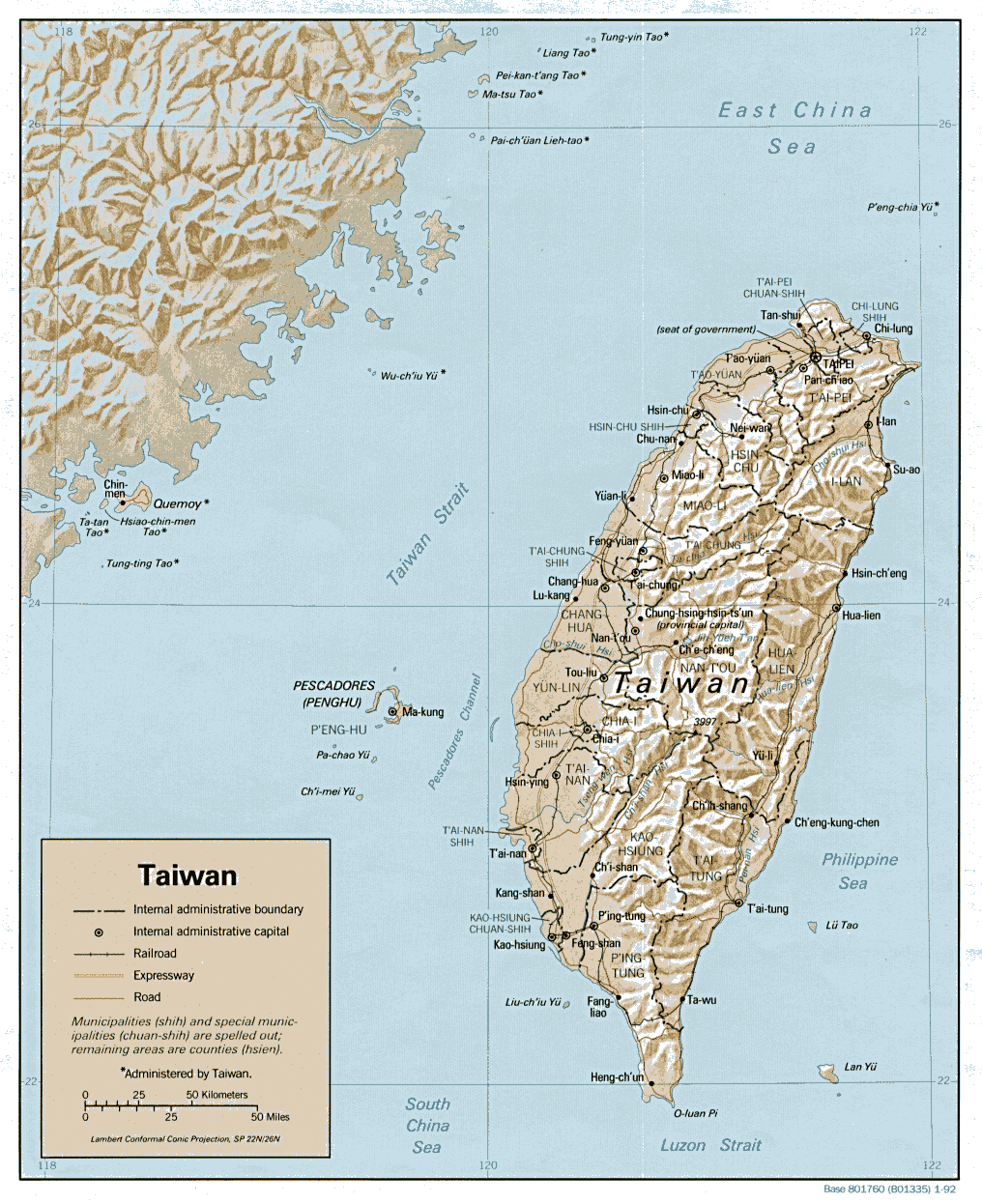
Elevation map of Taiwan

The flora of Taiwan (Chinese: 臺灣植物誌; pinyin: Táiwān Zhíwù Zhì) is rich and varied due to the island's diverse geography and climate zones. The main island is situated on the Tropic of Cancer between China and the Philippine Sea basin. There are mountains in the east, running north and south on two-thirds of the island, with many peaks over 10,000 feet in elevation, and lower, flatter, and more fertile land to the west. The tropical climate, plentiful rainfall, and wide altitudinal range make for abundant and varied vegetation. Taiwan is home to over 4300 species of vascular plants, of which it is estimated that 600 are ferns, 28 are gymnosperms, 2400 are dicots, and 1000 are monocots.

== Background ==
The island can be divided up into seven different floristic regions: northeastern; central; Hengchun; Lanyu (Orchid Island) and Lutao (Green Island); Alpine; upper montaine and supalpine; and lower montane and lowland.

The northeastern region of Taiwan receives much more rainfall and cloud coverage than other regions, making the species of this particular region distinct to this particular climate. Species of flora within this region include: Isoetes taiwanensis, Fagus hayatae, Maackia taiwaneses, Acer buergerianum var. formosanum, Sedum sekietense, Sedum uniflorum, Angelica dahurica, Angelica hirsutiflora, Rhododendron nakaharai, Rhododendron hyperthrum, Rhuchotechum formosanum, Salvia nippocanica var. formosana, Ericaulon chishingsanesis, Woodwardia harlandi, Cinnamomum austro-sinense, Mahonia japonica, Breischneidera sinensis, Triplerygium wilfordii, Ligularia japonica, Enkianthus perulaius, Quercus (Cyclobalanopsis) myrsinaefolia, Acronychia pedunculata, Enscaphis japonica, Lilum speciosum var. gloriosoides, Smilax nipponica, Keteleeria davidiana var. formosana.

The central region of Taiwan is characterized by basins, and is a plains region mostly surrounded by mountain ranges, such as the Hsueshan Range in the North. The isolated region consists of forests of endemic flora species such as: Castanopsis eyrie, Castanopsis kawakamii, Quercus dentata, Quercus serrata var. brevipetiolata, Lindera aggregata, Podocarpus nakaii, Ormosia formosana, Quercus (Cyclobalanopsis) globosa, Castanopsis fargesii, Lithocarpus nantoensis.

The Hengchun region of Taiwan is a subtropical evergreen forested area, with broad-leaved forests, as well as a few semi-tropical rain forests in the low-lands. Some of the flora species that can be found here include: Lithocarpus dodonaeifolius, L. shinsuiensis, Quercus hypophaea (Cyclobalanopsis hypophaea), Quercus repandifolia (Cyclobalanopsis repandifolia), Cinnamomum brevipedunculatum, C. reticulatum, Litsea lii, Machilus obovatifolia, Neolitsea daibuensis, N. hiiranensis, Ilex lonicerifolia var. matsudae, Aristolochia kaoi, Asarum epigynum, Acalypha matudai, Glyptopetalum pallidifolium, Dolichos trilobus var. kosyunensis, Gleditsia rolfei, Indigofera byobiensis, Medinilla formosana, Myrica adenophora var. kusanoi, Piper kawakamii, Reevesia formosana, Symplocos shilanensis, Camellia hengchunensis, Syzygium euphlebium, Syzygium kusukusense, Callicarpa remotiserrulata.

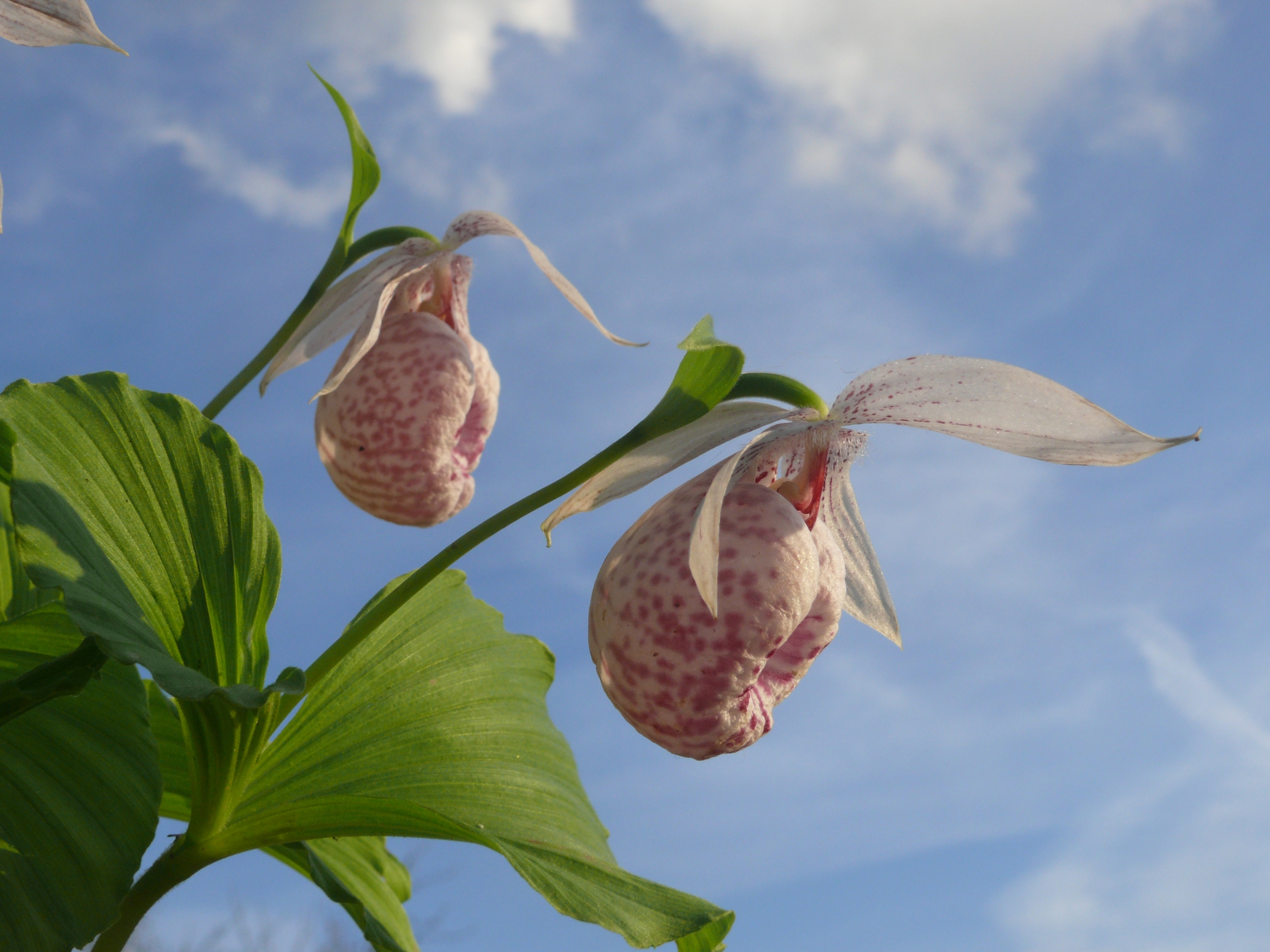
Cypripedium formosanum, also known as Formosan lady's slipper, an orchid native to the central mountains of Taiwan

The Lanyu (Orchid Island) and Lutao (Green Island) region of Taiwan is the most similar to the Philippines, unlike the rest of Taiwan which is more similar to China. Of 445 seed-plant species on these two islets, 46 are shared with the Philippines; Lanyu and Lutao is the only region of Taiwan that shares species with the neighboring country. Endemic species within this district consist of Cinnamomum kotoense, Murraya paniculata var. omphalocarpa, Chisocheton kanehirai, Acalypha hontauyuensis, Excoecaria kawakamii, Cissus lanyuensis, Calophyllum changii, Garcinia linii, Medimilla hayataina, Diospyros kotoensis, Alyxia insularis, Trachelospermum lanyuense, Lysionotus ikedae, and Lasianthus obliquinervis var. simizui.

The Alpine district of Taiwan has distinctly different flora from the rest of the country. The Alpine district consists mostly of boreal and temperate vegetation such as Botrychium lunar, Lycopodium selago var. appressum, Osmunda cinnamomea, etc.

The upper montane/subalpine district, similar to the Alpine district, is temperate to cool temperate. Conifers are the main vegetation of this region. Abies kawakamii, Tsuga chinensis, and Picea morrisonicola, to name a few, are some of the species that exist within this floristic zone.

The lower montane/lowland district of Taiwan is more similar to the warm climate forests, supporting broadleaf forests. Some of the species of the forests common to this floristic include: Castanopsis, Quercus, and Lithocarpus.

== Agricultural flora of Taiwan ==
Cultivated agriculture has drastically changed Taiwan's development. Agriculture has become as much a part of the naturally existing flora of Taiwan, and human influence on the land has greatly contributed to the vegetation of the country. Bamboo, fruits, grains and vegetable crops all thrive on the island, mostly thriving in the central, southern and eastern regions.

Bamboo has largely taken a hold in the country as a cash crop. Large areas of Taiwan have been converted into various bamboo plantations. Most of the bamboo is grown to support the developing economy; however, the species also provides support to rural communities as its sturdiness provides strength and stands firm in the midst of the high-speed winds that can dominate the country during rainy monsoon seasons.

Fruit trees typically grow in the low-lands of the island. Western and southwestern Taiwan are the primary fruit-producing regions. Fruits commonly grown in Taiwan are tropical and plentiful including lychees, ponkan tangerines, xuegan tangerines, oranges, bananas, grapes, betel nuts, kaochie pear, plum, peach, starfruit, persimmon, guava, papaya, mango, lemon, Indian dates, pineapples, coconuts, apricots, and loquat.

Grain and vegetable crops are mainly cultivated in northern Taiwan. Rice and vegetables are grown in large paddies in the lowlands of the Da'an River, plains of Miaoli and Hsinchu counties, the Houli and Taoyuan Plateaus, the Taipei Basin, and the Yilan Plain. The vegetables grown in these areas consist of kale, mustard, Chinese cabbage, wengtsai, celery, cucumber, yucca, winter melon, pumpkin, eggplant, red bean, peas, tomatoes, radishes, ginger, taro, onion, leek, and garlic. Vegetables are typically planted in rotation with rice, and their seasons do not coincide.

The major agricultural exports from Taiwan include paddy rice, sugarcane, cloud apples, and betel nuts.

== See also ==
- Outline of Taiwan
- Category:Flora of Taiwan
- Category:Endemic flora of Taiwan
- Category:Trees of Taiwan
- Flora of China
