= Phedimus daeamensis =

Scientific classification
- Kingdom: Plantae
- Clade: Tracheophytes
- Clade: Angiosperms
- Clade: Eudicots
- Order: Saxifragales
- Family: Crassulaceae
- Genus: Phedimus
- Species: P. daeamensis

Binomial name
- Phedimus daeamensis T.Y.Choi & D.C.Son

Species of succulent plant

Phedimus daeamensis is a species of flowering plant in the family Crassulaceae, endemic to Mt. Daeam in South Korea. It was first described in 2022 by Tae-Young Choi, Dong Chan Son, Takashi Shiga, and Soo-Rang Lee.

== Taxonomy and classification ==
The genus Phedimus was classified within Sedum prior to 1995. Phedimus daeamensis belongs to the subgenus Aizoon and is most closely related to Phedimus middendorffianus and Phedimus takesimensis.

== Distribution and habitat ==
This species is found exclusively on Mt. Daeam in Korea, growing at altitudes of approximately 1000 meters. It thrives in rocky cliffs and crevices.

== Etymology ==
The species name daeamensis is derived from Mt. Daeam, the locality where the plant was first discovered.
