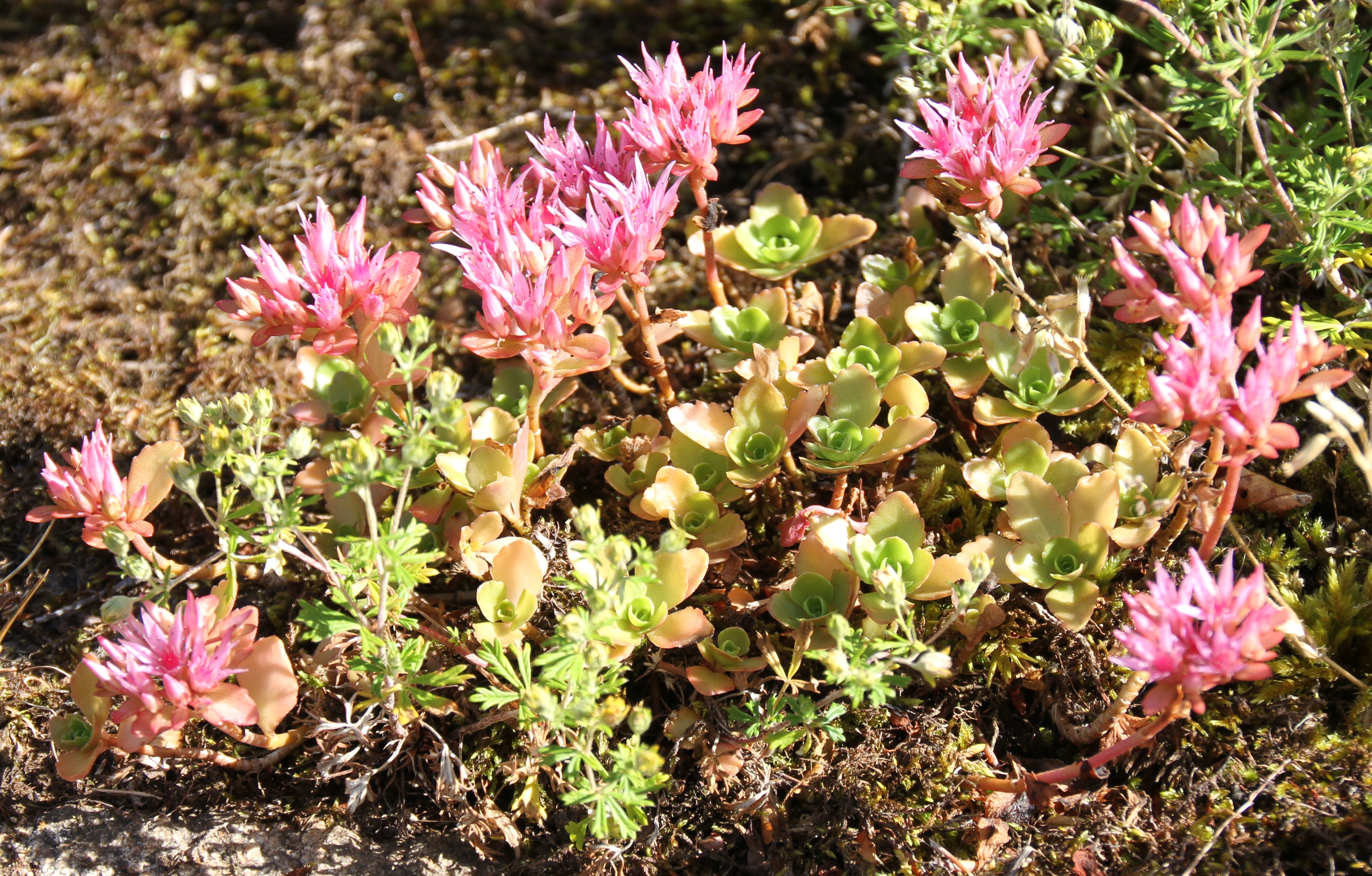

Scientific classification
- Kingdom: Plantae
- Clade: Tracheophytes
- Clade: Angiosperms
- Clade: Eudicots
- Order: Saxifragales
- Family: Crassulaceae
- Genus: Phedimus
- Species: P. spurius

Binomial name
- Phedimus spurius M.Bieb.

Synonyms
- List: Asterosedum spurium (M.Bieb.) Grulich; Sedum spurium M.Bieb.; Spathulata spuria (M.Bieb.) Á.Löve & D.Löve; Crassula crenata Desf.; Phedimus crenatus (Desf.) V.V.Byalt; Sedum ciliare (Haw.) Sweet; Sedum congestum K.Koch ex Boiss.; Sedum crenatum (Desf.) Boiss.; Sedum dentatum (Haw.) DC.; Sedum involucratum M.Bieb.; Sedum lazicum Boiss.; Sedum oppositifolium Sims

= Phedimus spurius =

Species of succulent flowering plant

Phedimus spurius, formerly Sedum spurium, the Caucasian stonecrop or two-row stonecrop, is a species of flowering plant in the family Crassulaceae. It is a low-growing, spreading succulent with stems that creep along the ground and root as they grow.

P. spurius occurs naturally in the rocky subalpine meadows of Georgia, northern Iran, and northeastern Turkey. It has naturalized in Europe, often found along roadsides, walls, and waste areas, escaping cultivation to form persistent colonies. It is widely grown for its tolerance of drought and rocky conditions. Wild populations and cultivars vary in color from white to red; greener-leaved plants produce paler blooms and those with red or purple foliage developing deeper-colored flowers.

== Taxonomy ==
Species of Phedimus have traditionally been included in the genus Sedum. Within the genus Phedimus, P. spurius belongs to the subgenus Phedimus. The specific epithet, spurius, means "false", though its intended meaning in this context is uncertain.

== Description ==
Phedimus spurius is a stonecrop with numerous stems that either sprawl along the ground or creep, often taking root as they grow. These stems, which are smooth or slightly bumpy, are typically 5–15 cm long. The leaves, which are usually arranged in opposite pairs but occasionally alternate, are either attached directly to the stem or have very short stalks. They grow in two rows along the stems, which is why the plant is sometimes called "two-row stonecrop", and vary in shape from spoon-like to rounded or oblong, with a wedge-shaped base and small, rounded teeth along the upper edges. Leaf size ranges from 15–35 mm in length and 10–12 mm in width. The leaves are succulent and medium green with edges tinged in red. The older leaves (on the lower parts of the stems) are deciduous, while the newer leaves (near the stem tips) are evergreen. In autumn, these upper leaves deepen to a rich burgundy color, persisting through winter.

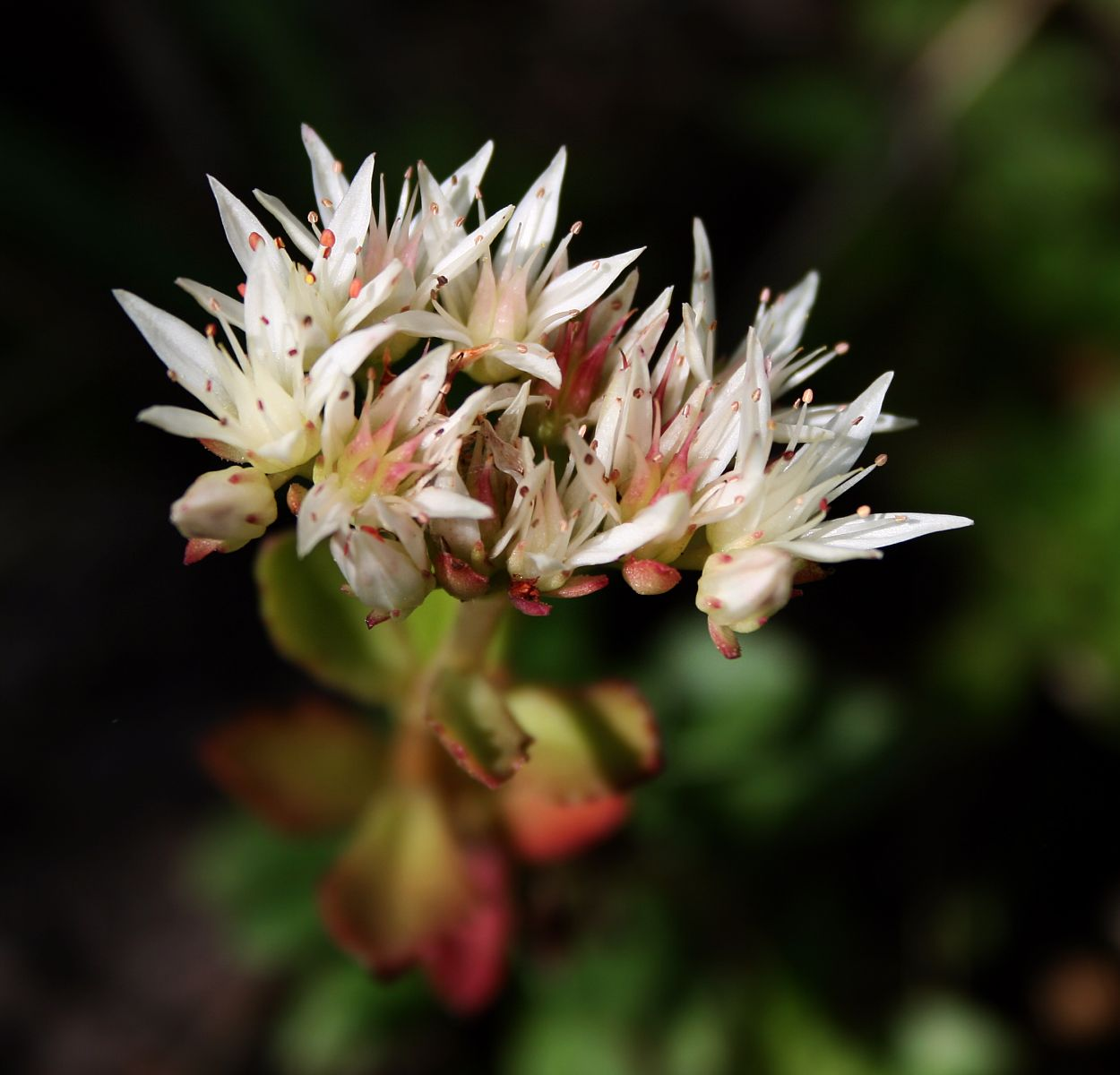
The flowers P. spurius may be white or red or any color in-between.

Flowering stems, which can lie along the ground or grow at an angle, reach 10–30 cm and have a rough texture and reddish color. The flowers are densely clustered in flat-topped groups called corymbs, each containing 15–30 blooms. The bracts (small, leaf-like structures beneath the flowers) are narrow and elongated. The flowers themselves usually have five, but occasionally six, petals and sit on very short stalks or are nearly stalkless. The sepals are triangular and pointed, sometimes with a slightly rough texture near the tip, growing up to 10 mm long. The petals are upright at the base but spread out towards the top, often with slightly curled tips and a central ridge. They measure 7–12 mm and come in shades from pure white to deep crimson. The flower's stamens are 5–9 mm long, with red pollen-producing structures. The species flowers from late spring to mid-summer, attracting butterflies. The small, four-sided nectar glands are about 0.5 × 1 mm. The fruit consists of five upright, smooth seed capsules, each 5–9 mm long and joined at the base.

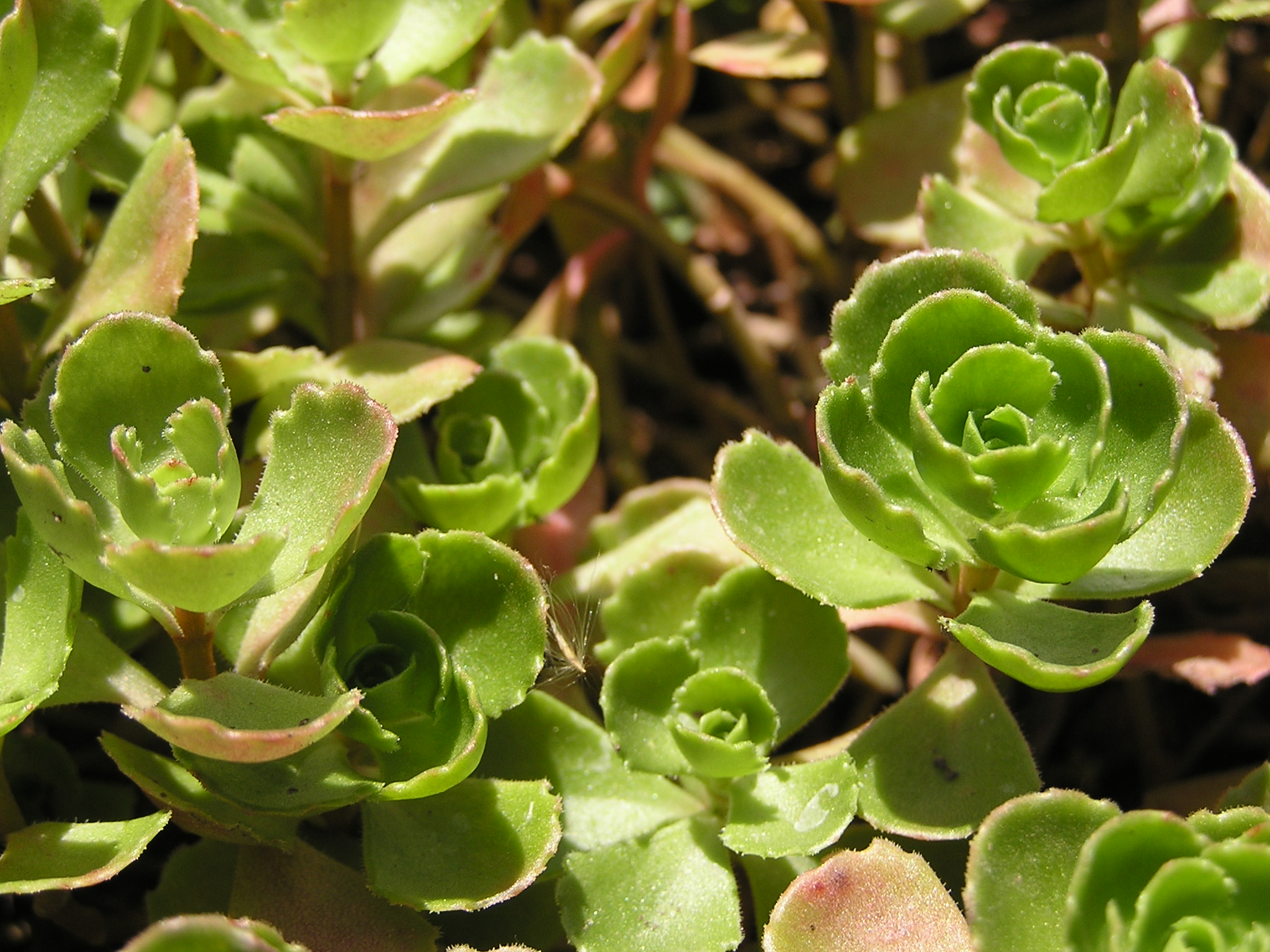
The size of the leaves of P. spurius is considerably variable among different populations.

Phedimus spurius shows considerable variation in leaf shape and size, as well as flower color. In the northeastern part of its range, white-flowered forms (once described as Sedum involucratum and S. oppositifolium) are more common, while in the west, red-flowered forms dominate. Despite these differences, genetic studies suggest that all forms belong to a single, uniform species. In early growth stages, P. spurius can resemble P. hybridus or P. ellacombianum, but their differences become apparent upon flowering—while the latter two bear yellow blossoms, P. spurius does not. White-flowered varieties of P. spurius are generally less floriferous, yet all forms spread vigorously, with tangled stems extending beyond 30 cm over time—behavior uncommon in related species.

== Distribution and habitat ==
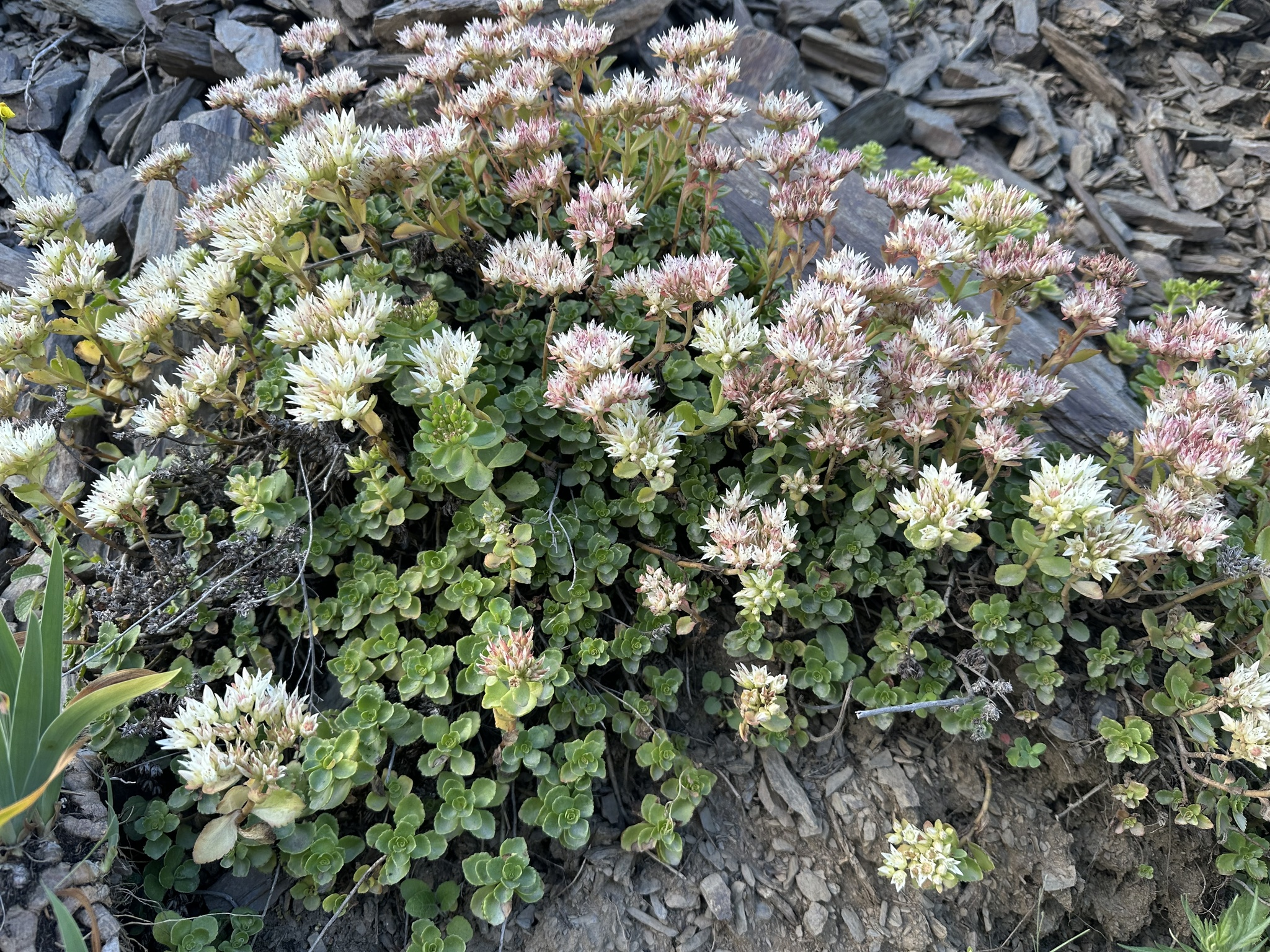
White-flowered forms of P. spurius are more common in the northeast of its natural range.

The type specimen of Phedimus spurius was collected in Georgia. The species is distributed in Georgia, northern Iran, and northeastern Turkey, where it inhabits cool, rocky sites and subalpine meadows at elevations ranging from 1,250 to 3,000 meters.

Phedimus spurius has become naturalized in many parts of Europe, especially in various disturbed habitats, such as walls, rocky areas, roadsides, refuse sites, and waste ground. It frequently escapes cultivation, likely through garden waste disposal or dispersal by birds. Once established, it can form persistent colonies.

== Cultivation ==
The horticulturist Ray Stephenson has described Phedimus spurius as "perhaps ... the most common stonecrop in cultivation". It thrives in well-drained, acidic to neutral soils with dry to moderate moisture levels and prefers full sun, though it can handle some light shade. It grows well in sandy or gravelly soil, adapts to nutrient-poor conditions, and requires proper drainage to stay healthy. It is highly drought-resistant and should not be overwatered. Pests and diseases rarely attack it, but snails, slugs, and scale insects may appear.

Phedimus spurius is commonly planted in rock gardens, small-scale ground cover, and border fronts, this plant also thrives in stone wall crevices, sunny slopes, and along edges. Due to its vigorous spreading habit, it is unsuitable for small rock gardens but excels as a fast-growing ground cover. It can overtake more delicate species and requires management. The plant struggles in containers, needing ample space to expand. It may also be used in green roofs. It spreads easily by rooting at nodes that touch the ground and can be propagated effortlessly through cuttings or division. Dark-leaved and variegated forms grow more slowly, making them valuable for contrast in borders.

Numerous cultivars of Phedimus spurius have been developed, though many lack distinguishing traits. Leaf color correlates with flower shade—plants with the greenest foliage tend to produce the palest blooms, while those with wine-red, copper, or deep purple leaves develop progressively darker flowers. The typical form has pink-purple flowers and green foliage that acquires a reddish hue in full sun. Cultivars vary in color intensity, from pale to dark.

- 'Coccineum' (syn. 'Splendens') is a cultivar with redder flowers and reddish-tinged foliage, cultivated for over a century.
- 'Album' (syn. Sedum oppositifolium) is a white-flowered form with consistently green foliage, but reluctant to bloom.
- 'Green Mantle' (syn. 'Album Superbum') is similar to 'Album' but more floriferous, with white blooms that fade to pale pink.
- 'Salmoneum' is a North American selection with slightly more salmon-toned flowers than the typical species.
- 'Schorbuser Blut' ('Dragon's Blood'), a slow-growing yet highly sought-after form, begins the season with bright green, red-edged leaves but darkens by autumn. It has received the Royal Horticultural Society's Award of Garden Merit.
- 'Roseum' is an older variety nearly identical to the species.
- 'Erd Blut' produces purple flowers with more deeply suffused foliage.
- 'Bronze Carpet' is a North American form with bronzed leaves and slightly deeper-colored flowers.
- 'Fulda Glut' is notably darker than the typical species. It also has reddish leaves but produces striking scarlet flowers.
- Sedum spurium 'Voodoo' has leaves heavily tinged with dark red and deep reddish-pink flowers.
- 'Ruby Mantle' features deep red foliage and purple blooms.
- 'Red Carpet' stands out with its bronze foliage and bright red blossoms.
- 'Purpurteppich' ('Purple Carpet'), true to its name, bears purple flowers and large, springtime leaves that emerge brown-violet.
- 'Tricolor' is known in North America under this name, while in Europe it is sold as Sedum spurium var. variegatum. Its leaves display a striking mix of green, creamy-white, and wine-red. The leaf shape differs from the species, leading to occasional misidentification as S. kamtschaticum var. variegatum. However, the latter has a more upright habit and yellow flowers, whereas 'Tricolor' produces light pink-purple blooms. Reversion to solid green is common.
- Sedum spurium var. involucratum is rare in cultivation and identifiable by its exceptionally large sepals, nearly matching the petals in length. It is a small, light-petaled form with chromosome counts of 2n = 28 and 42.
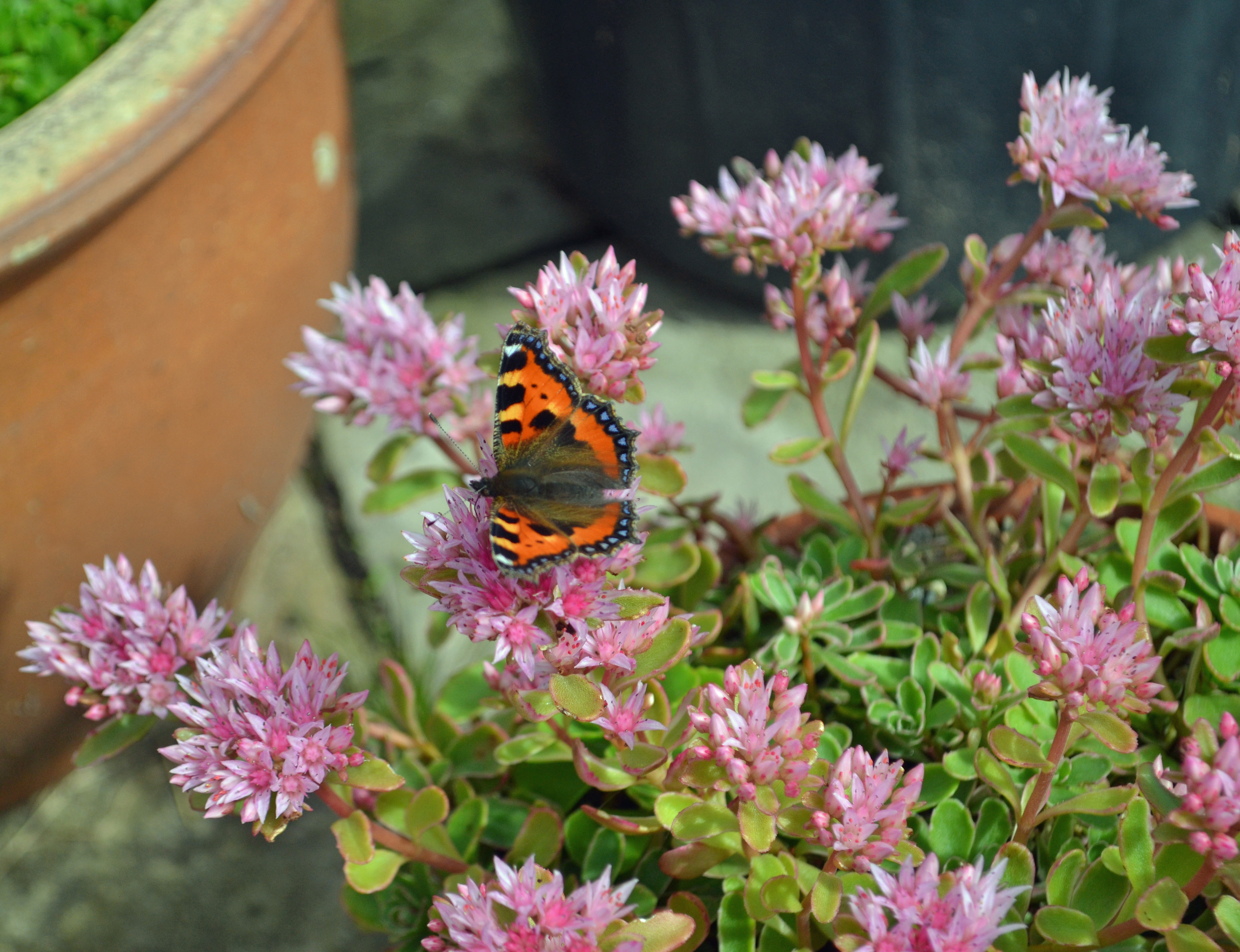
Aglais urticae on a potted P. spurius. The stonecrop's flowers are attractive to butterflies.

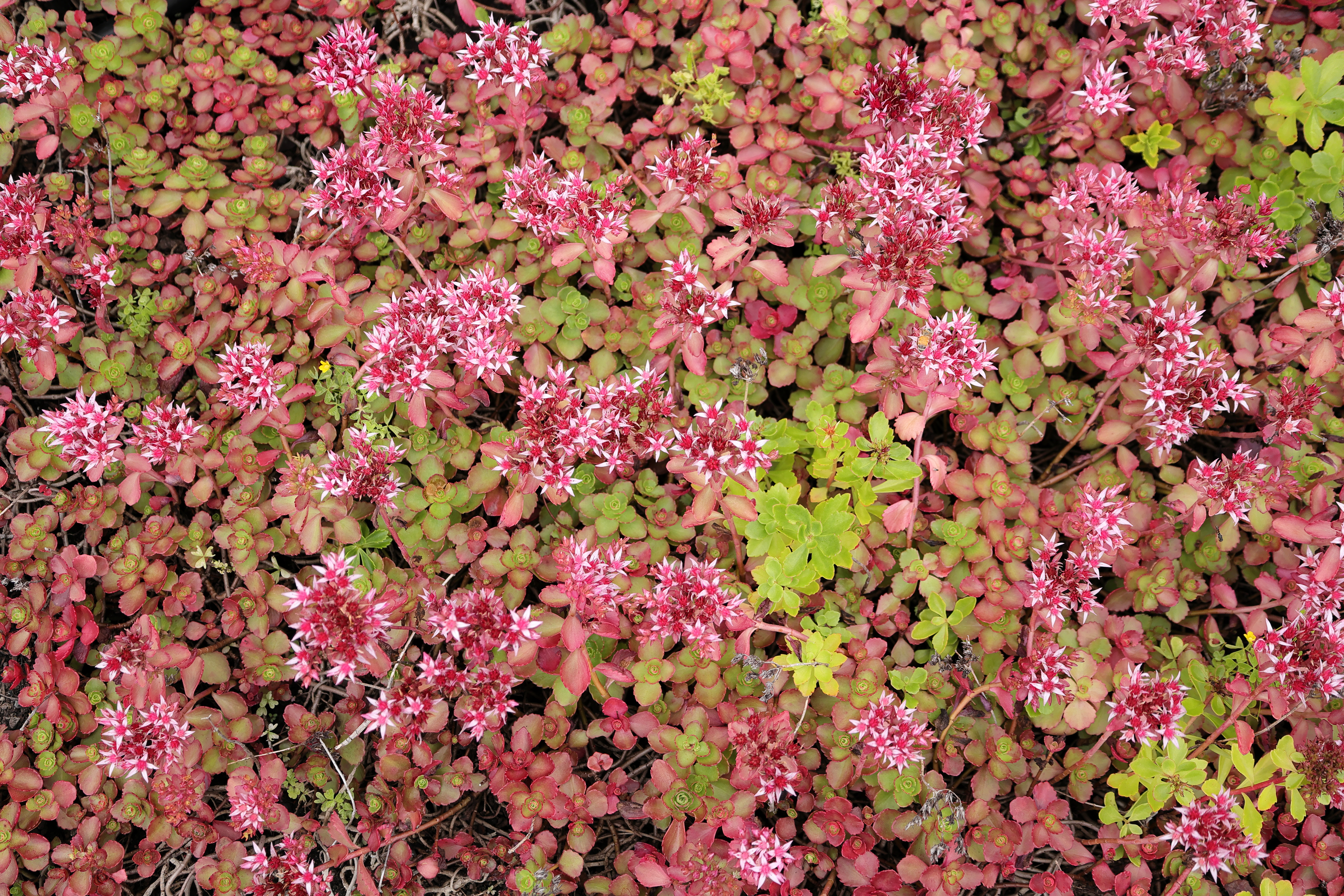
'Coccineum' has been in cultivation for over 100 years.

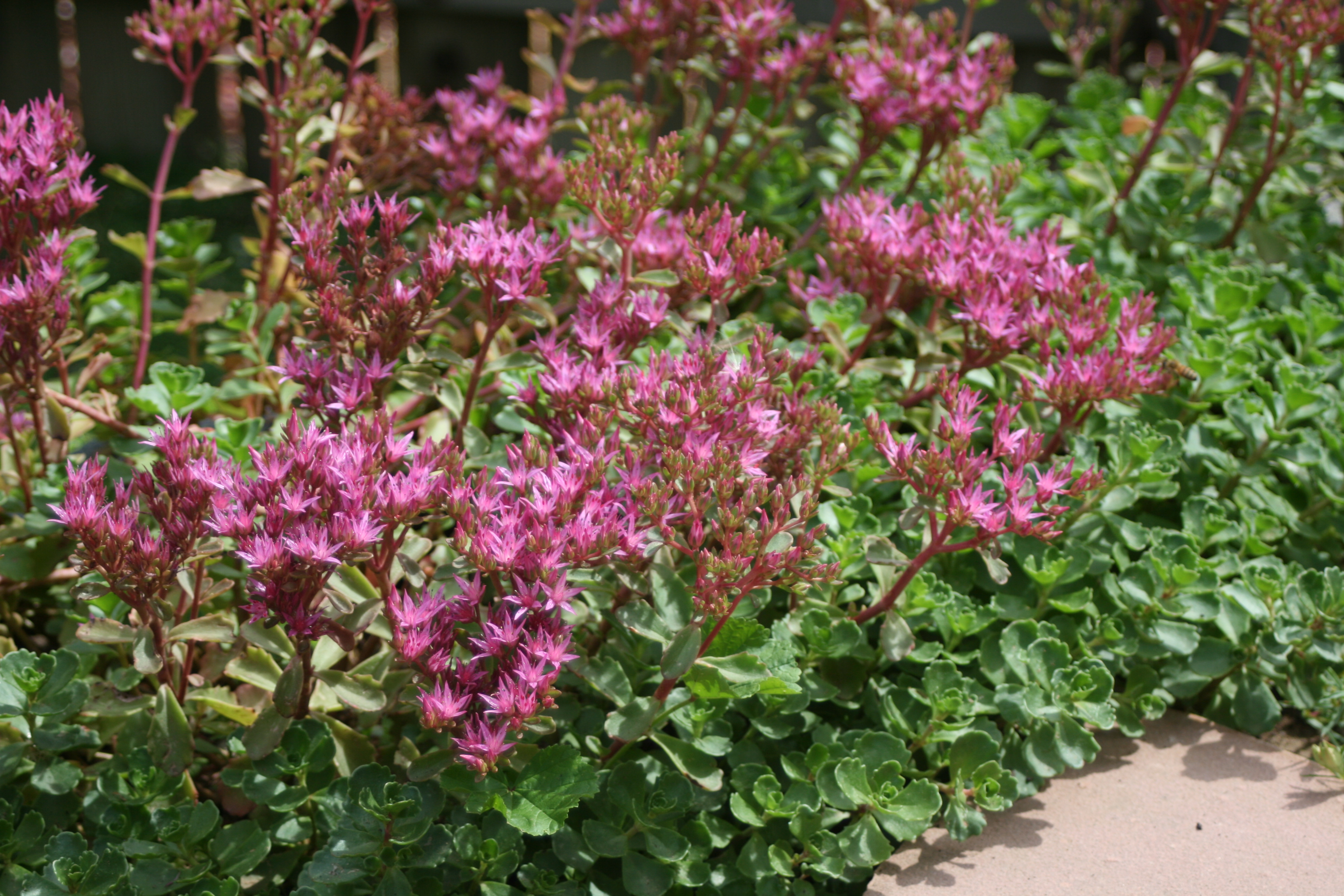
'Dragon's Blood' is particularly popular.

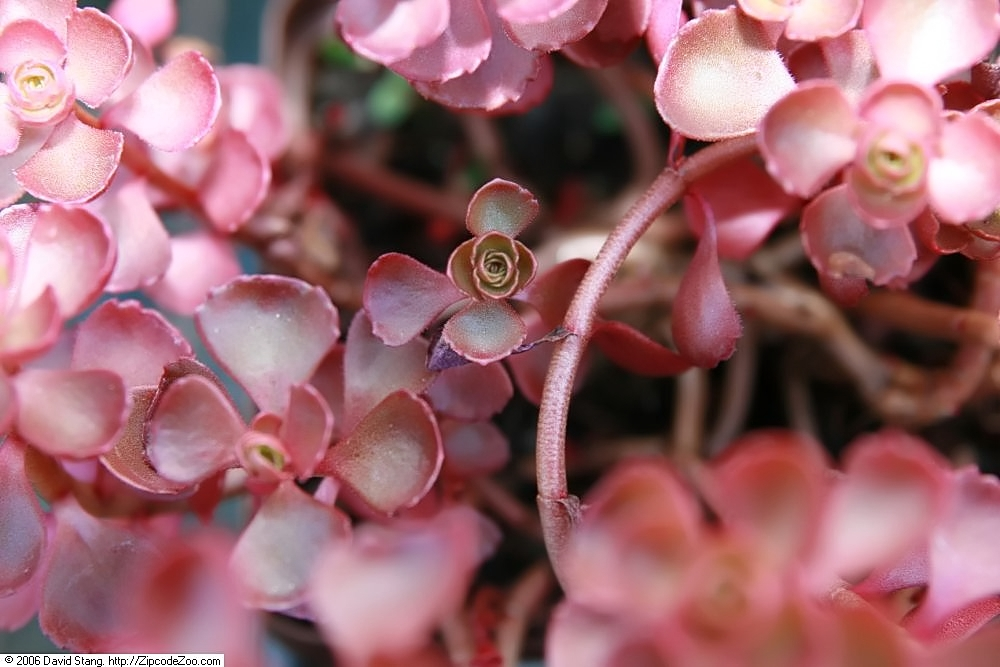
The leaves of 'Voodo' are especially dark.

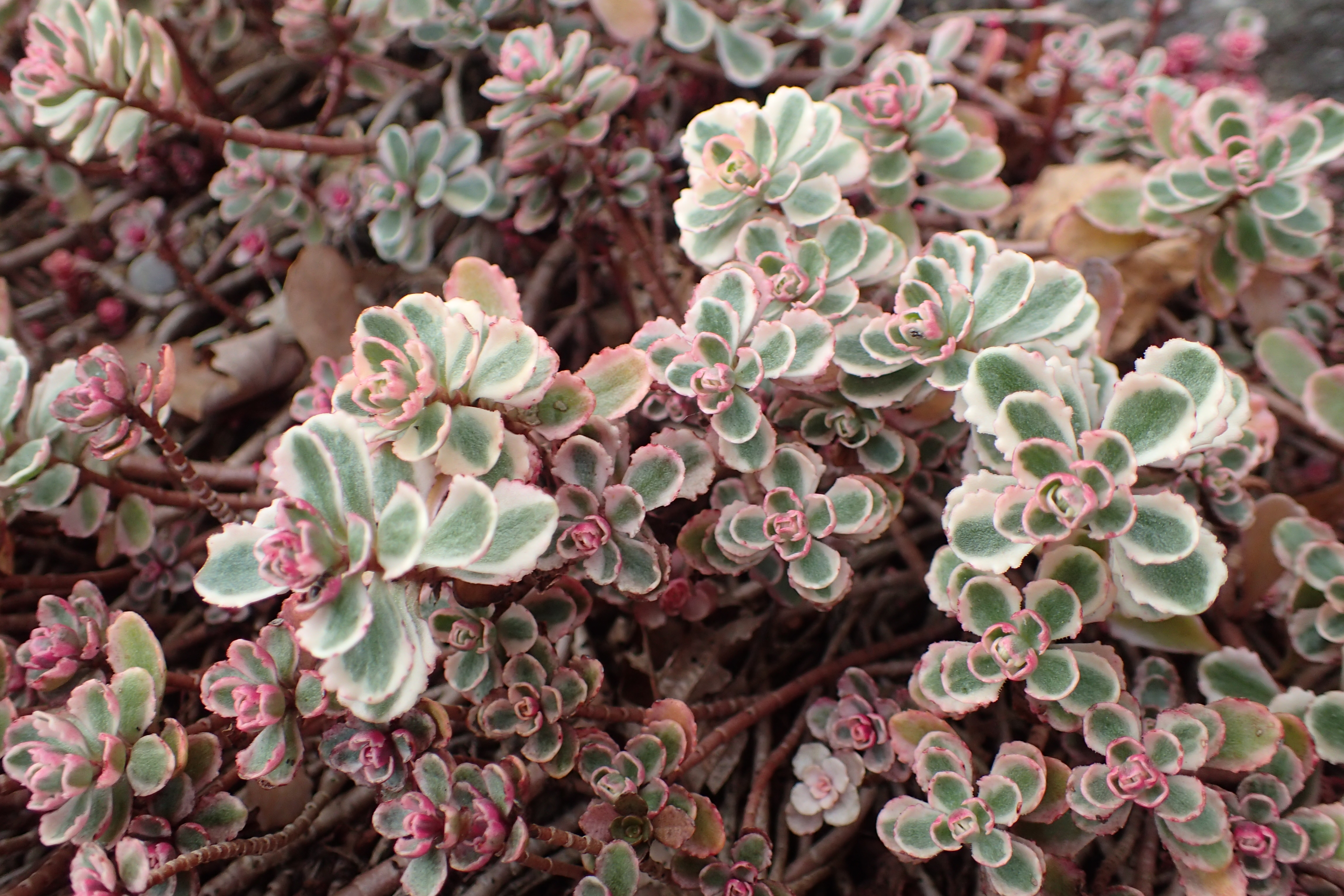
'Tricolor' has multicolored and unusually shaped leaves.
