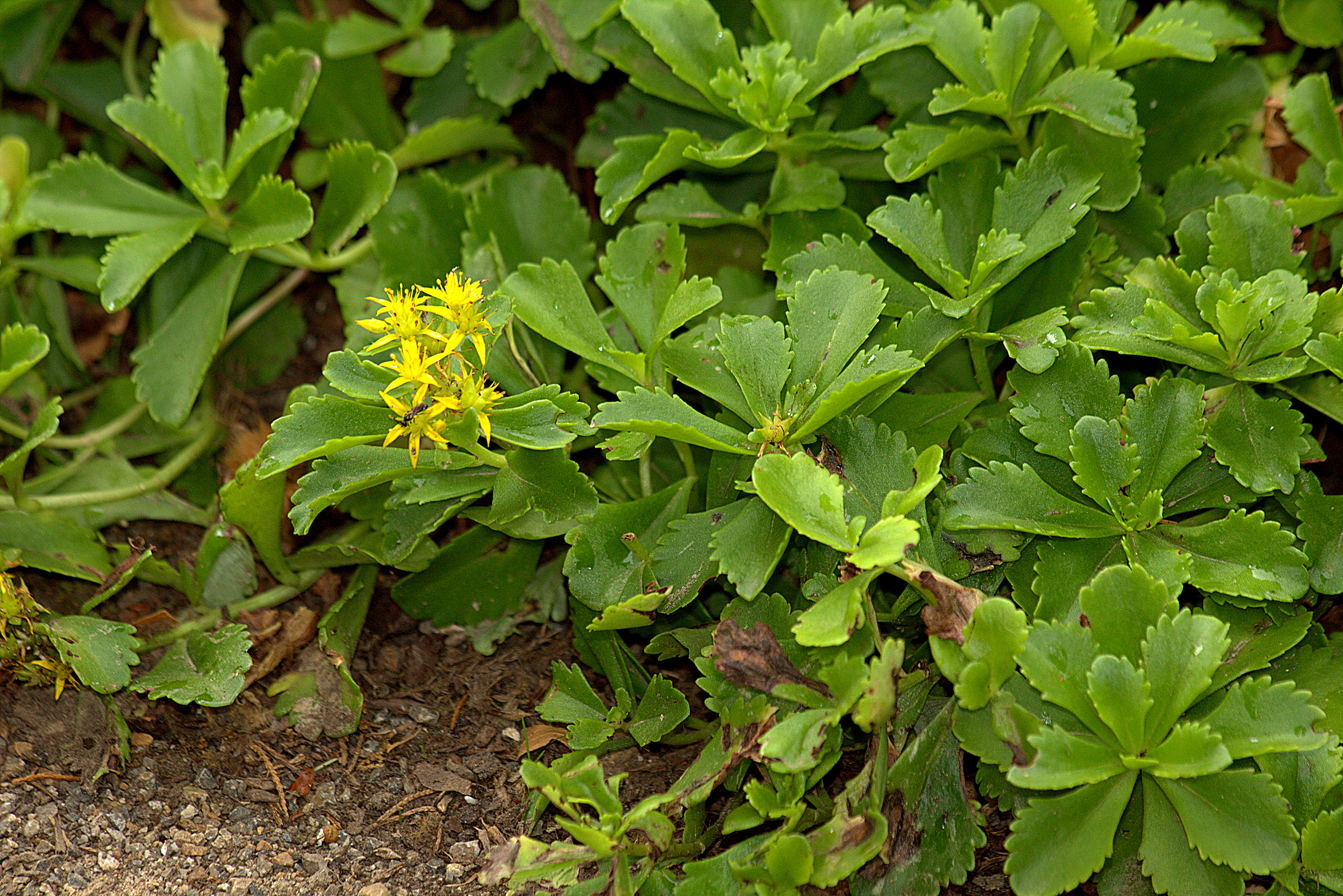

Scientific classification
- Kingdom: Plantae
- Clade: Tracheophytes
- Clade: Angiosperms
- Clade: Eudicots
- Order: Saxifragales
- Family: Crassulaceae
- Genus: Phedimus
- Species: P. selskianus

Binomial name
- Phedimus selskianus (Regel & Maack) 't Hart

= Phedimus selskianus =

Species of succulent flowering plant

Phedimus selskianus is a species of succulent flowering plant from the Crassulaceae family.

Phedimus selskianus was originally described, in 1861, as Sedum selskianum. In 1931 it was demoted to a subspecies of Sedum aizoon. In the most recent classification of the crassulacean plants, the species is placed in the genus Phedimus rather than Sedum. One of the most distinctive features of Phedimus selskianus within the Phedimus subgenus Aizoon is the presence of conspicuous glandular hairs, setting it apart from closely related species.

Phedimus selskianus is native to the Russian Amur Oblast in eastern Siberia, Manchuria in northeastern China, and Japan. It thrives in dry, rocky, and stony slopes, as well as in deciduous forests and open fields.

Phedimus selskianus is a perennial herbaceous plant with erect, hairy stems and a thick, woody rhizome. The leaves come in different shapes, ranging from narrow and pointed to more elongated and oval; some are long and slender with slightly rounded edges. The upper part of the leaf margin is finely toothed, while both surfaces are finely pubescent, giving them a dark, glossy green appearance.

Phedimus selskianus blooms in mid-summer. The flowering branches are relatively slender and covered in fine hairs, reaching heights of 15–50 cm. The inflorescence is a corymb, a large, dense cluster measuring 5–10 cm across. The flowers are star-like, with five to six white petals, slightly shorter than the sepals, and fused at the base for up to 2 mm. The sepals are narrow and pointed, blunt-tipped, and covered in fine hairs on the upper side. The stamens have orange anthers, and the nectar glands are small and yellowish. The fruit is produced in late summer. It consists of multiple follicles, each measuring 4–6 mm in length, and contains numerous tiny seeds.
