= Flora of China (disambiguation) =

Flora of China may refer to:

- Flora of China (the People's Republic of China)
- Flora of Taiwan (the Republic of China)
- Flora of China (series), a scientific publication aimed at describing the plants native to China
- Flora Sinensis, a 1656 book by Michał Boym

== See also ==
- Fauna of China
