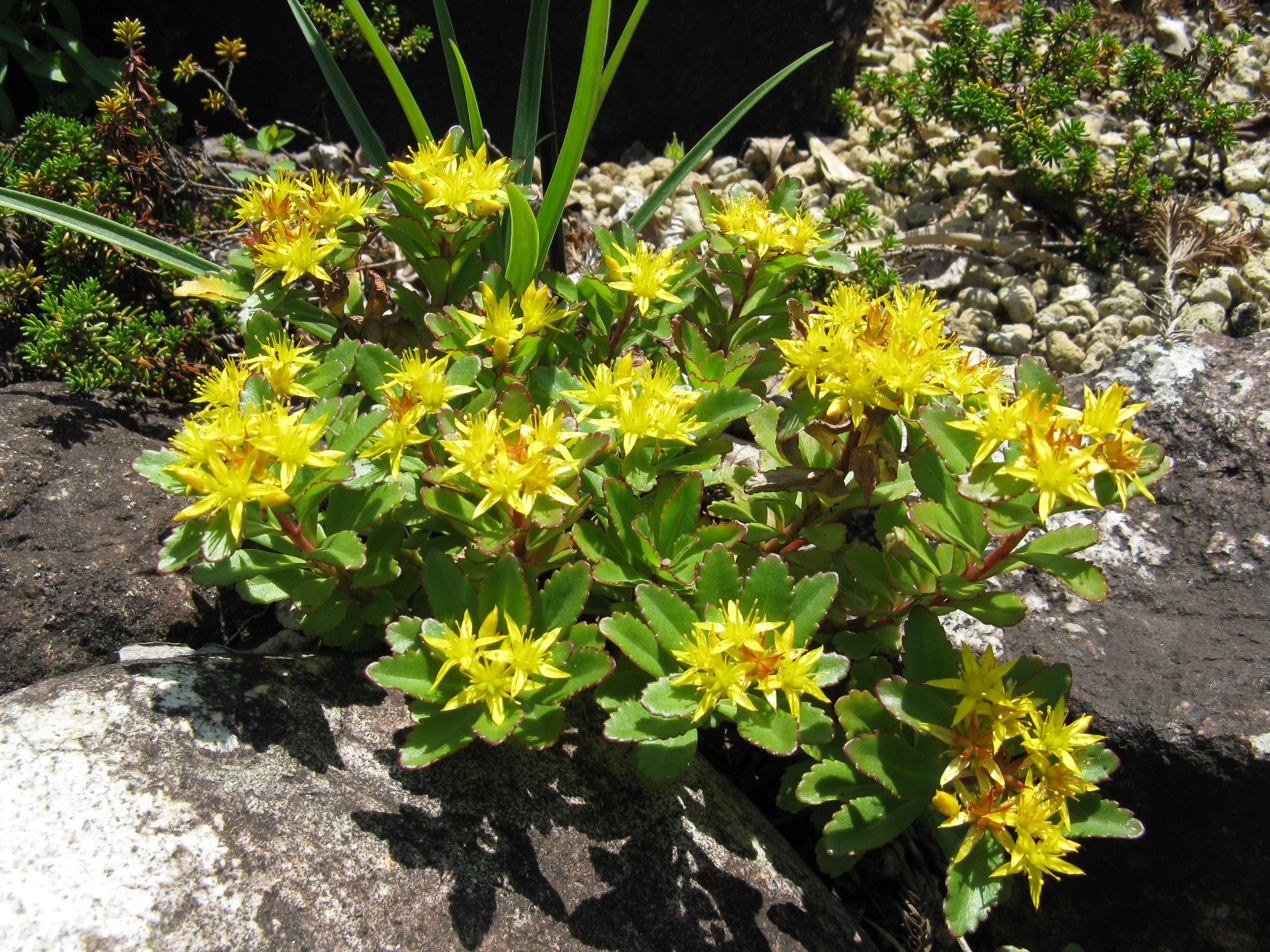

Scientific classification
- Kingdom: Plantae
- Clade: Tracheophytes
- Clade: Angiosperms
- Clade: Eudicots
- Order: Saxifragales
- Family: Crassulaceae
- Genus: Phedimus
- Species: P. aizoon

Binomial name
- Phedimus aizoon (L.) 't Hart

Synonyms
- List: Aizopsis aizoon (L.) Grulich; Anacampseros aizoon (L.) Haw.; Sedum aizoon L.

= Phedimus aizoon =

Species of succulent plant

Phedimus aizoon is a species of succulent herbaceous perennial plant in the family Crassulaceae. It is native to China, the Russian Far East, Korea, Japan, Mongolia, and Kazakhstan, where it grows on rugged terrain. It is commonly used as an ornamental plant, but is also edible.

== Description ==
Phedimus aizoon is a non-creeping stonecrop that regrows annually from a sturdy, woody rootstock. It has tuberous roots that range from carrot-shaped to narrowly conical. It produces one to three upright, unbranched stems, typically growing between 20 and 50 cm tall. The leaves are arranged alternately along the stem and vary in shape, from narrow and lance-like to broader forms such as elliptic, ovate, or nearly round. They measure 3.5–8 cm in length and 0.5–3 cm in width, with a wedge-shaped base and an irregularly serrated edge. The tip may be rounded or pointed. The leaves are deciduous.

The flowers appear in horizontally branched clusters with numerous blooms and leaf-like bracts. Each flower has five unevenly sized segments. The sepals are slender, measuring 3–5 mm long, with an obtuse tip. The yellow petals are oblong to lance-shaped, spanning 6–10 mm, and taper to a fine point. The flower contains ten stamens, which are shorter than the petals. Small, four-sided nectar glands about 0.3 mm in size are present at the base. The carpels, which later form seed pods, are oblong with a convex outer surface and are fused together at the base. The styles are slender and tapering. As the plant matures, it produces star-like seed pods about 7 mm long. The seeds themselves are tiny, ellipsoid, and approximately 1 mm in size. This species typically flowers in early summer and fruits in late summer.

The specific epithet, derived from Greek, means "everliving", likely referring to the ability of most stonecrops to persist as hardy, long-lasting plants. The botanist Harald Fröderström considered Phedimus kamtschaticus and P. aizoon to be a single, highly variable species, but today they are recognized as distinct species within a large species complex. Two varieties of Phedimus aizoon are widely recognized: P. aizoon var. aizoon and P. aizoon var. scaber.

== Distribution and habitat ==
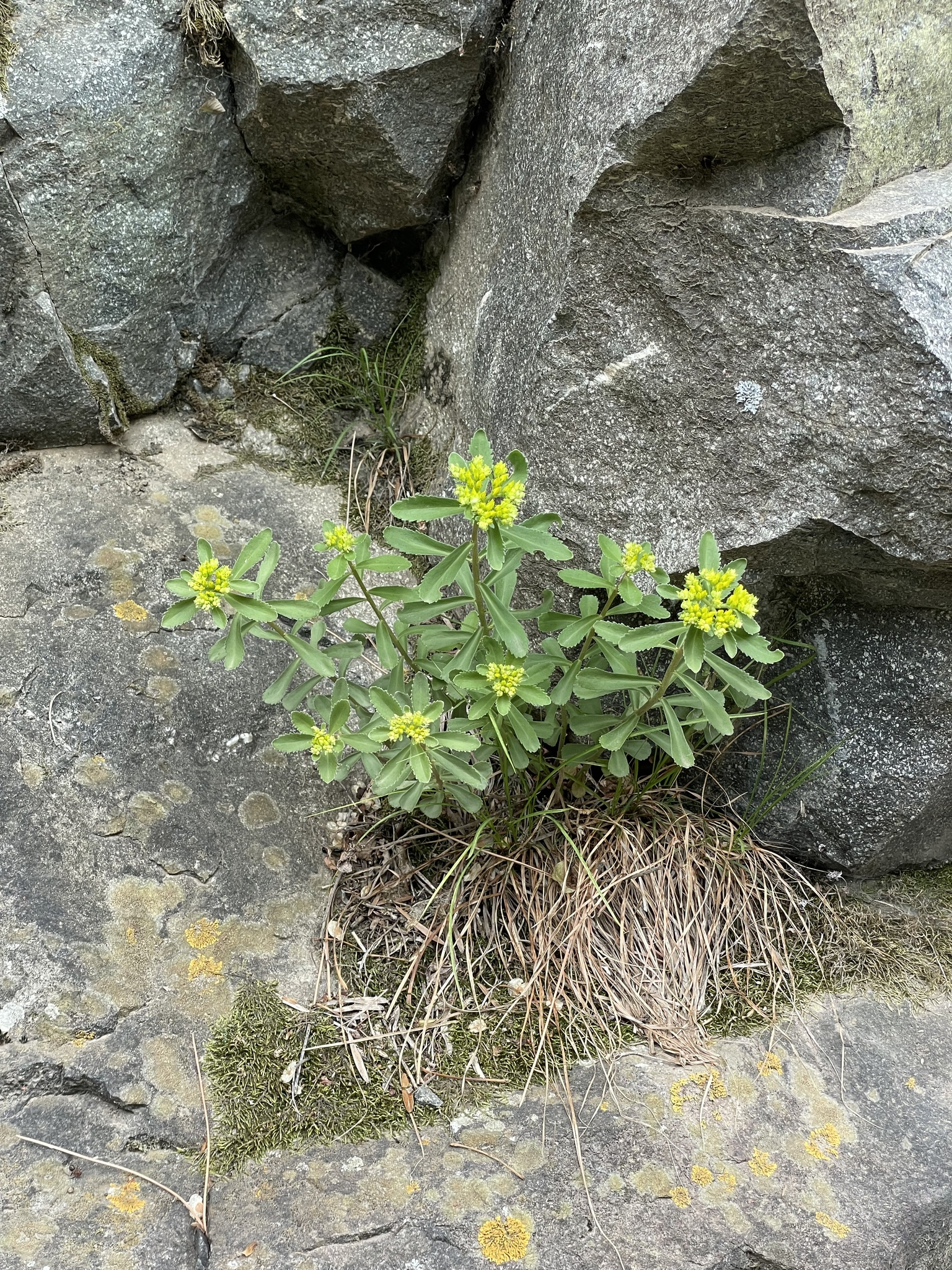
P. aizoon can be found in rugged environments such as rocky crevices.

Phedimus aizoon is typically found in rugged environments, such as the edges of ravines in valleys, grasslands on rocky slopes, and dry, sunny areas on mountains. It also grows in sandy or grassy habitats on slopes, field edges, and rocky crevices. The species thrives at elevations ranging from 1,000 to 3,100 meters.

Native to Central and East Asia, Phedimus aizoon occurs across much of Russia, including Altay, Amur, Buryatia, Chita, Irkutsk, Khabarovsk, Krasnoyarsk, Primorye, Sakhalin, Tuva, West Siberia, and Yakutia. It is also found in Mongolia, Kazakhstan, Korea, Japan, the Kuril Islands, and several regions of China: North China, Central China, East China, South China, South-Central China, Southeast China, and South-West China. The species has been introduced to Europe (Austria, Germany, Czechoslovakia, and Scandinavian and Baltic countries), Canada (Alberta, Saskatchewan, Manitoba, Ontario, and the Maritimes), and the United States (New England, the Midwest, and the Great Lakes region). The plants have been spreading as garden escapees.

== Uses ==
Phedimus aizoon is edible. Young leaves and stems may be cooked. The species is traditionally used in Chinese herbal medicine. Flavonoids from P. aizoon exhibited antibacterial activity against lactic acid bacteria in vitro and extended the shelf life of refrigerated pork by inhibiting microbial growth, color loss, and the oxidation of myoglobin. The flavonoids of P. aizoon have been found to have strong antioxidant effects, help regulate blood sugar and fat levels, and protect organs from damage in mice with type 1 diabetes by reducing oxidative stress, suggesting their potential use in diabetes-friendly functional foods.

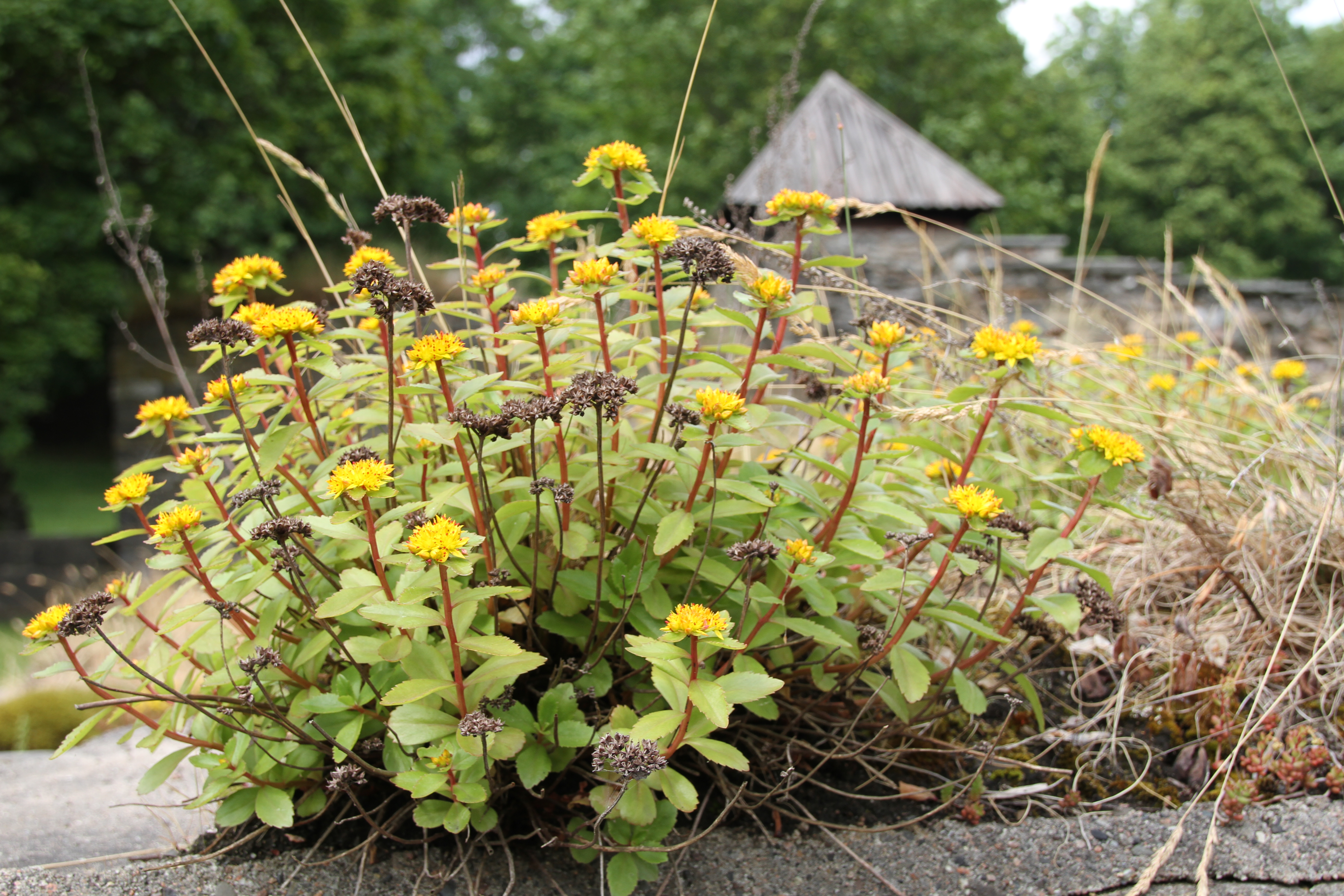
P. aizoon, seen here growing atop the ruins of the Hovedøya Abbey, is well-suited to use in cottage gardens.

Phedimus aizoon is commonly grown as an ornamental plant. It thrives in rocky, shallow, dry to moderately moist, well-drained soils with low to moderate fertility, ranging from limestone to sandstone. It prefers full sun but tolerates light shade well and adapts to moist conditions if drainage is adequate. Under ideal conditions, it readily self-seeds. Most cultivated varieties are relatively tall, reaching up to 100 cm, and typically complete their growing cycle by mid-summer. This species is commonly found in two colorful forms: one with bright green foliage and vivid yellow flowers, and another with darker, wine-brown leaves and richer golden blooms. The species is particularly suitable to cottage gardens, and due to its extreme drought tolerance, to green roofs.
