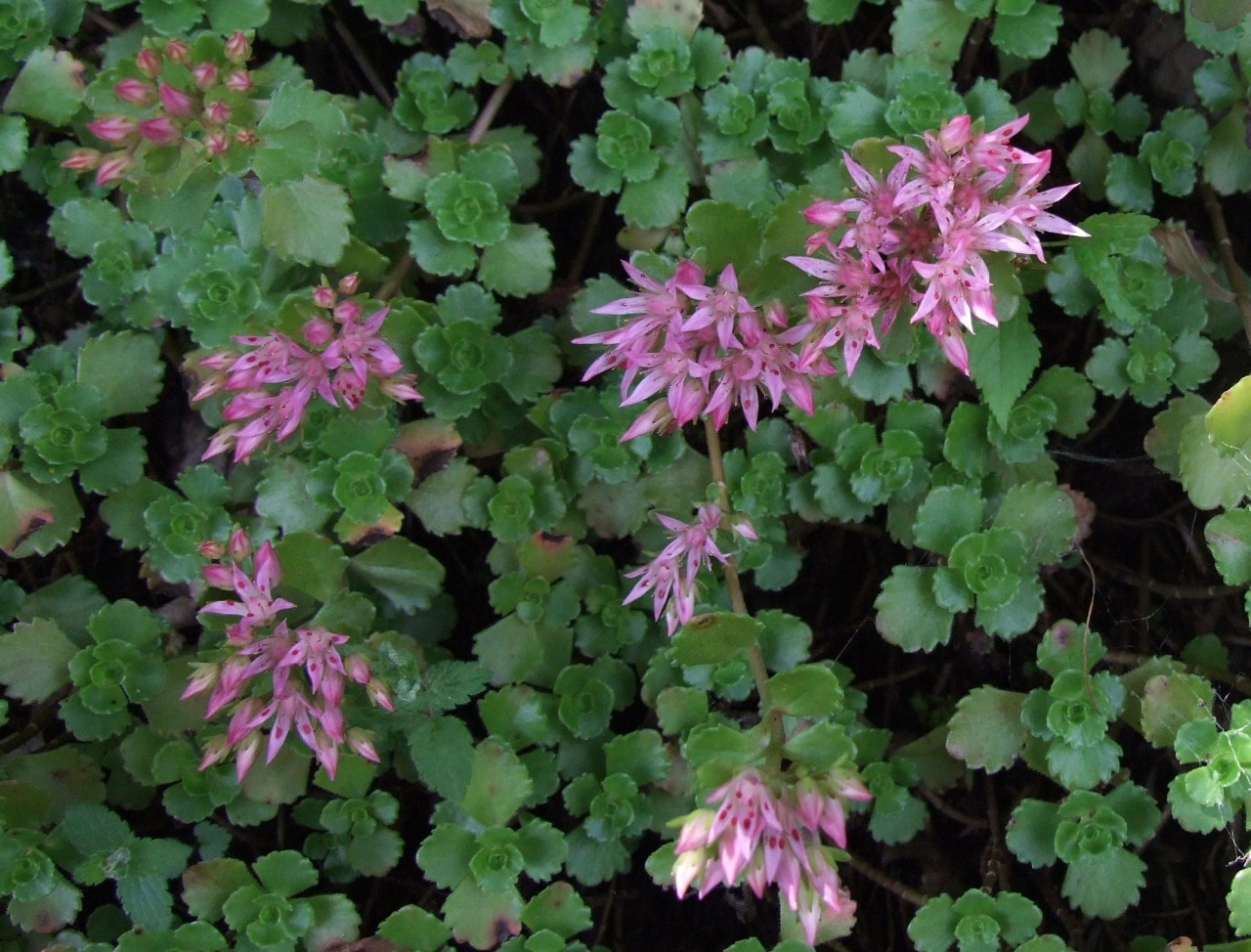
- Phedimus spurius

Scientific classification
- Kingdom: Plantae
- Clade: Tracheophytes
- Clade: Angiosperms
- Clade: Eudicots
- Order: Saxifragales
- Family: Crassulaceae
- Subfamily: Sempervivoideae
- Tribe: Umbiliceae
- Genus: Phedimus; Raf.

Type species
- Phedimus stellatus

Subgenera
- Phedimus; Aizoon

= Phedimus =

Genus of flowering plants

Phedimus is a genus of the succulent family Crassulaceae (stonecrop family), with about 18 species, distributed in eastern Europe and Asia. The genus is described with two subgenera, but one of these is also recognized as a separate genus, Aizopsis. Phedimus kamtschaticus (syn. Sedum kamtschaticum) is widely grown as an ornamental ground cover and has gained the Royal Horticultural Society's Award of Garden Merit.

== Description ==
Species are perennial or rarely annual herbs, usually glabrous stems, sometimes woody at base, from thin woody rhizome. Leaves decussate or alternate, with narrow base, and several hydathodes on lower face along margins. The flowering branches are erect or descending, with dense inflorescences exhibiting many flowered terminal pleiochasia (several buds come out at the same time). Flowers 4-7 parts, sepals usually unequal, petals free, usually spreading. The fruits are follicles, usually spreading and seeds costate-papillate (incompletely connate), but multipapillate in Phedimus selskianus.

When treated as Phedimus sensu lato, i.e. including Aizopsis, subgenus Phedimus (Phedimus sensu stricto) has creeping and rooting stems, flowers white, pink, red or purplish and chromosome numbers x=5,6,7, while subgenus Aizoon has annual shoots often woody at base, emerging from woody rhizomes, flowers yellow, orange or reddish and x=8.

== Taxonomy ==
Phedimus is a genus in the family Crassulaceae, subfamily Sempervivoideae, tribe Umbiliceae, together with three other genera. It was segregated from the very large cosmopolitan and polyphyletic genus, Sedum, where it was variously considered a section or subgenus. Within the tribe it is a sister group to Aizopsis. There, it is distinguished by flower colouration (pink or white flowers compared to the yellow flowers of Aizopsis), floral morphology, distribution (Eurasia vs. Asia) and chromosome numbers (x=14 vs. 16). Some authors include Aizopsis as a subgenus:

- Phedimus subgenus Phedimus c. 5 species
- Phedimus subgenus Aizoon c. 13 species

=== Species ===
- Phedimus aizoon (L.) 't Hart
- Phedimus daeamensis T.Y.Choi & D.C.Son
- Phedimus ellacombeanus (Praeger) 't Hart
- Phedimus hybridus (L.) 't Hart
- Phedimus kamtschaticus (Fisch.) 't Hart
- Phedimus litoralis (Kom.) 't Hart
- Phedimus middendorffianus (Maxim.) 't Hart
- Phedimus obtusifolius (C.A.Mey.) 't Hart
- Phedimus odontophyllus (Fröd.) 't Hart
- Phedimus × pilosus (S.B.Gontch. & Koldaeva) J.M.H.Shaw
- Phedimus rhodocarpus (V.V.Byalt & Sun-Den-Kho) A.A.Gontch.
- Phedimus selskianus (Regel & Maack) 't Hart
- Phedimus sichotensis (Vorosch.) 't Hart
- Phedimus sikokianus (Maxim.) 't Hart
- Phedimus spurius (M.Bieb.) 't Hart
- Phedimus stellatus (L.) Raf.
- Phedimus stevenianus (Rouy & E.G.Camus) 't Hart
- Phedimus stoloniferus (S.G.Gmel.) 't Hart
- Phedimus subcapitatum (Hayata) S.S.Ying
- Phedimus yangshanicus Z.Chao

== Distribution ==
Subgenus Phedimus, Mediterranean to Caucasus. Subgenus Aizoon China, Japan, Korea and central Siberia.

== Bibliography ==
- Thiede, J; Eggli, U (2007). "Crassulaceae". In Kubitzki, Klaus (ed.). Berberidopsidales, Buxales, Crossosomatales, Fabales p.p., Geraniales, Gunnerales, Myrtales p.p., Proteales, Saxifragales, Vitales, Zygophyllales, Clusiaceae Alliance, Passifloraceae Alliance, Dilleniaceae, Huaceae, Picramniaceae, Sabiaceae. Springer. pp. 83–119. ISBN 978-3540322146. (full text at ResearchGate)
- Gontcharova, S. B.; Artyukova, E. V.; Gontcharov, A. A. (June 2006). "Phylogenetic relationships among members of the subfamily Sedoideae (Crassulaceae) inferred from the ITS region sequences of nuclear rDNA" (PDF). Russian Journal of Genetics. 42 (6): 654–661. doi:10.1134/S102279540606010X. S2CID 33249840. Archived from the original (PDF) on 2017-08-09.
- Grulich, Vit (1984). "Generic division of Sedoideae in Europe and the adjacent regions" (PDF). Preslia. 56: 29–45.
- Ohba, Hideaki; Bartholomew, Bruce M.; Turland, Nicholas J.; Kunjun, Fu (2000). "New Combinations in Phedimus (Crassulaceae)". Novon. 10 (4): 400–402. Bibcode:2000Novon..10..400O. doi:10.2307/3392995. JSTOR 3392995. Archived from the original on 2021-08-20.
