= Glyptopetalum grandiflorum =

Scientific classification
- Kingdom: Plantae
- Clade: Tracheophytes
- Clade: Angiosperms
- Clade: Eudicots
- Clade: Rosids
- Order: Celastrales
- Family: Celastraceae
- Genus: Glyptopetalum
- Species: G. grandiflorum

Binomial name
- Glyptopetalum grandiflorum Bedd.

Species of flowering plant

Glyptopetalum grandiflorum is a species of flowering plant in the family Celastraceae. It is native to southwestern India and Sri Lanka.

== Description ==
Glyptopetalum grandiflorum is a shrub with terete branchlets that become angular when young. The leaves are elliptic-oblong, coriaceous, and usually measure 10–15.5 cm long and 5–6.5 cm wide. The leaf base is rounded or cuneate and the apex is acute to acuminate. Flowers are borne in slender, filiform cymes, usually 3-flowered. The petals are yellow and obovate, while the fruit is a smooth, globose capsule containing arillate seeds.

== Range ==
The species is native to the southwestern part of India and to Sri Lanka.

== Habitat ==
It grows primarily in seasonally dry tropical forests and related habitats. In India, it has been recorded from the southern Western Ghats, including parts of Kerala.

== Ecology ==
Flowering and fruiting have been recorded from February to June.

== Etymology ==
The generic name Glyptopetalum is derived from Greek roots referring to sculptured or carved petals, while the specific epithet grandiflorum means "large-flowered" in Latin.

== Taxonomy ==
The species was first described by the British botanist Richard Henry Beddome in 1871 in Icones Plantarum Indiae Orientalis.
