= Glyptopetalum lawsonii =

Conservation status
- Vulnerable (IUCN 2.3)

Scientific classification
- Kingdom: Plantae
- Clade: Tracheophytes
- Clade: Angiosperms
- Clade: Eudicots
- Clade: Rosids
- Order: Celastrales
- Family: Celastraceae
- Genus: Glyptopetalum
- Species: G. lawsonii

Binomial name
- Glyptopetalum lawsonii Gamble

Species of flowering plant

Glyptopetalum lawsonii is a species of flowering plant in the family Celastraceae. It is endemic to Tamil Nadu in India.
