= Glyptopetalum palawanense =

Conservation status
- Vulnerable (IUCN 2.3)

Scientific classification
- Kingdom: Plantae
- Clade: Tracheophytes
- Clade: Angiosperms
- Clade: Eudicots
- Clade: Rosids
- Order: Celastrales
- Family: Celastraceae
- Genus: Glyptopetalum
- Species: G. palawanense

Binomial name
- Glyptopetalum palawanense Merr.

Species of tree

Glyptopetalum palawanense is a tree in the family Celastraceae. The specific epithet palawanense refers to the species being native to the island of Palawan in the Philippines.

== Description ==
Glyptopetalum palawanense grows as a small tree up to 5 metres (20 ft) tall. Its twigs are coloured grey-green. The roundish fruits measure up to 1.5 cm (0.6 in) long.

== Distribution and habitat ==
Glyptopetalum palawanense grows naturally in Palawan and in neighbouring Sabah in Borneo. Its habitat is coastal ridges.
