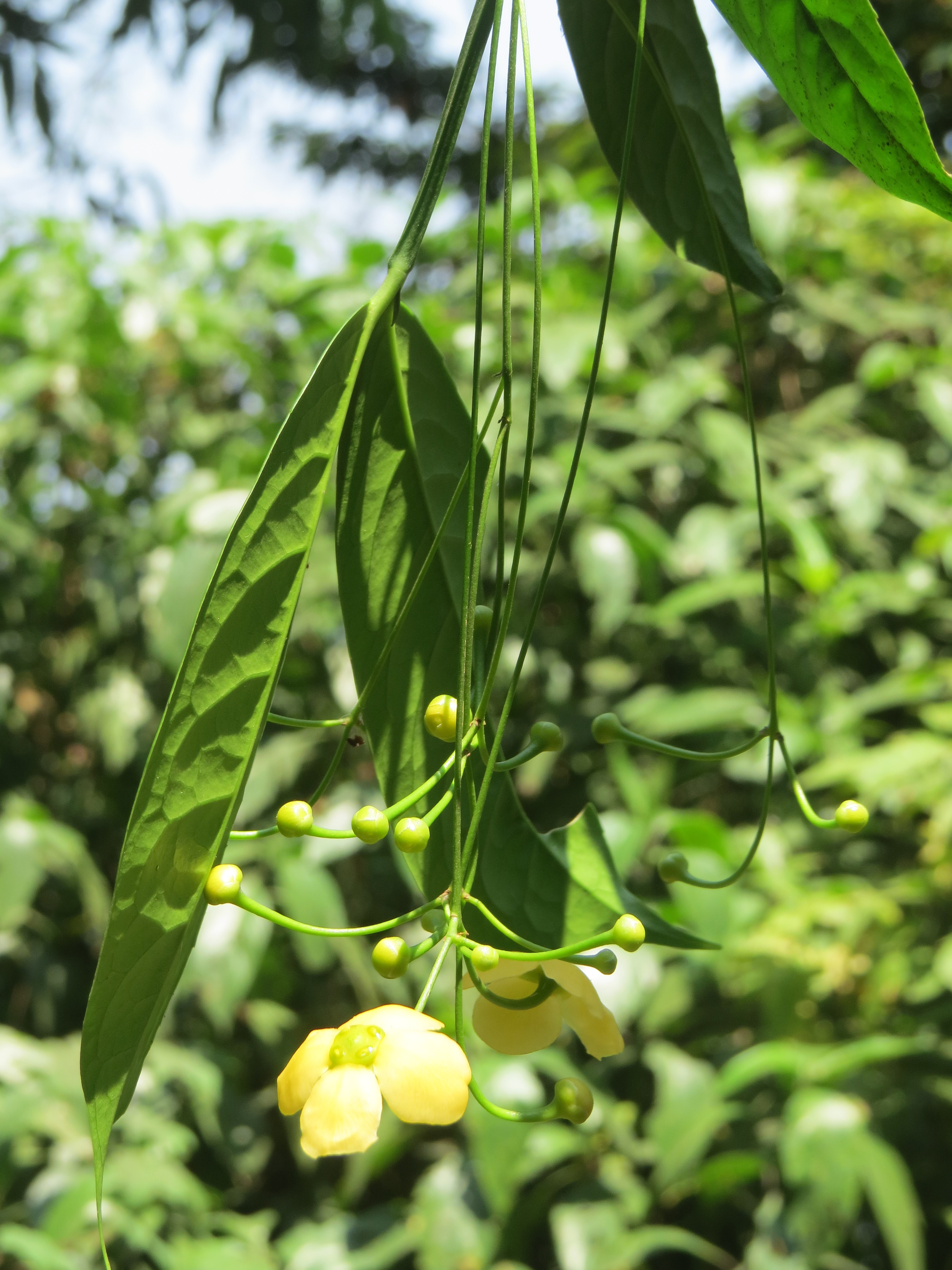
- Glyptopetalum grandiflorum

Scientific classification
- Kingdom: Plantae
- Clade: Tracheophytes
- Clade: Angiosperms
- Clade: Eudicots
- Clade: Rosids
- Order: Celastrales
- Family: Celastraceae
- Genus: Glyptopetalum; Thwaites

Species
- See text

= Glyptopetalum =

Genus of flowering plants

Glyptopetalum is a genus of plant in the family Celastraceae.

== Species ==
As of October 2024, Plants of the World Online accepted these species:

- Glyptopetalum acuminatissimum Merr.
- Glyptopetalum angulatum (Griff.) Chakrab. & M.Gangop.
- Glyptopetalum calocarpum (Kurz) Prain
- Glyptopetalum calyptratum Pierre
- Glyptopetalum chaudocense Pierre
- Glyptopetalum euonymoides Merr.
- Glyptopetalum euphlebium (Merr.) Merr.
- Glyptopetalum feddei (H.Lév.) Ding Hou
- Glyptopetalum fengii (Chun & F.C.How) Ding Hou
- Glyptopetalum geloniifolium (Chun & F.C.How) C.Y.Cheng
- Glyptopetalum gracilipes Pierre
- Glyptopetalum grandiflorum Bedd.
- Glyptopetalum harmandianum Pierre
- Glyptopetalum ilicifolium (Franch.) C.Y.Cheng & Q.S.Ma
- Glyptopetalum integrifolium Q.W.Lin, Z.X.Zhang & Q.R.Liu
- Glyptopetalum lawsonii Gamble
- Glyptopetalum loheri Merr.
- Glyptopetalum longepedunculatum Tardieu
- Glyptopetalum longipedicellatum (Merr. & Chun) C.Y.Cheng
- Glyptopetalum marivelense Merr.
- Glyptopetalum palawanense Merr.
- Glyptopetalum pallidifolium (Hayata) Q.R.Liu & S.Y.Meng
- Glyptopetalum poilanei Tardieu
- Glyptopetalum quadrangulare Prain ex King
- Glyptopetalum reticulinerve C.Y.Wu ex G.S.Fan & Y.J.Xu
- Glyptopetalum rhytidophyllum (Chun & F.C.How) C.Y.Cheng
- Glyptopetalum sclerocarpum M.A.Lawson
- Glyptopetalum stixifolium Pierre
- Glyptopetalum subcordatum Ding Hou
- Glyptopetalum thorelii Pit.
- Glyptopetalum tonkinense Pit.
- Glyptopetalum verticillatum Q.R.Liu & S.Y.Meng
- Glyptopetalum vidalii Savinov
- Glyptopetalum zeylanicum Thwaites
