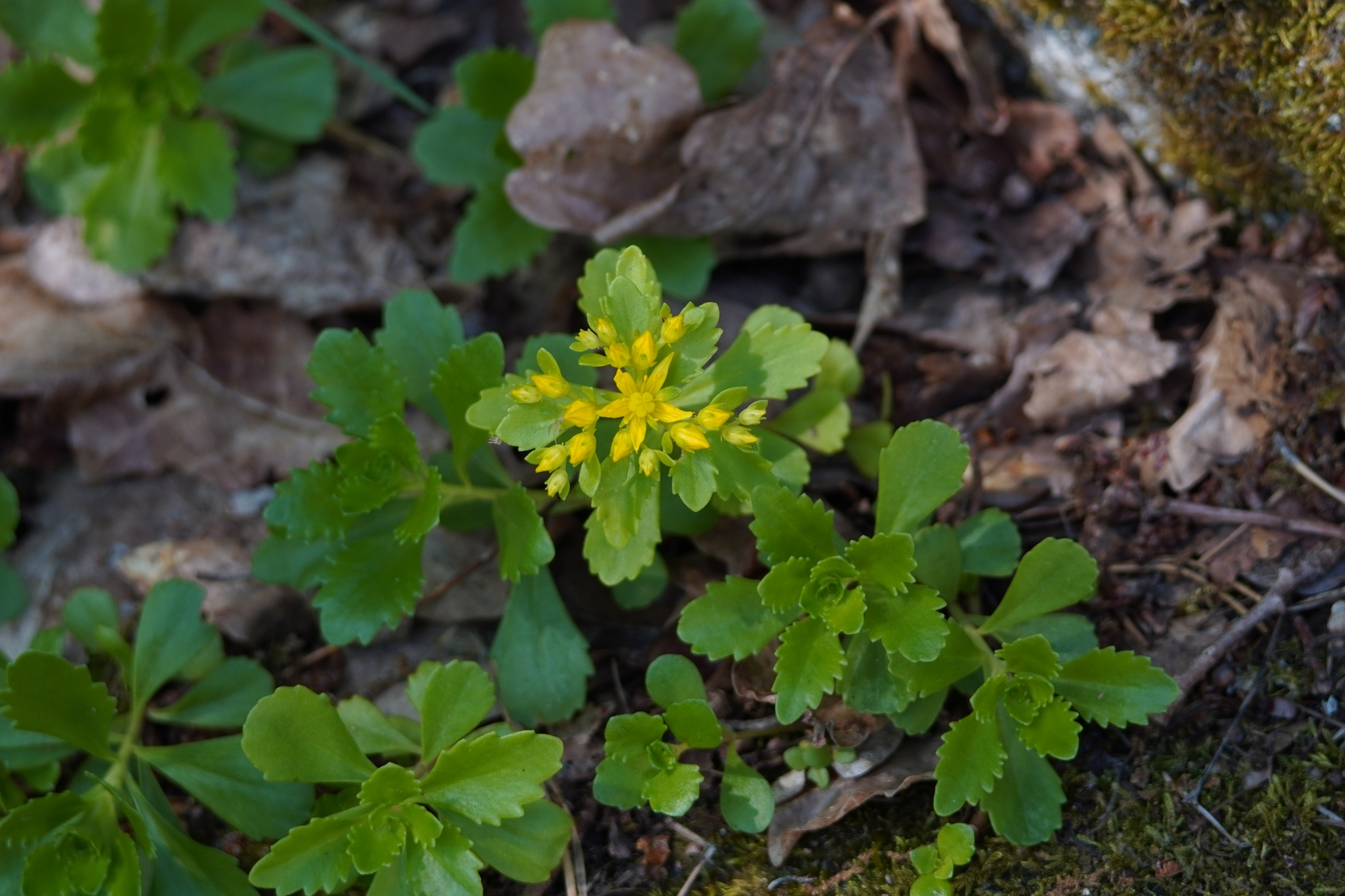

Scientific classification
- Kingdom: Plantae
- Clade: Tracheophytes
- Clade: Angiosperms
- Clade: Eudicots
- Order: Saxifragales
- Family: Crassulaceae
- Genus: Phedimus
- Species: P. ellacombeanus

Binomial name
- Phedimus ellacombeanus (Praeger) H.'t Hart

Synonyms
- Aizopsis ellacombeana; Phedimus ellacombianus; Sedum ellacombeanum; Sedum ellacombianum; Sedum kamtschaticum subsp. ellacombeanum; Sedum kamtschaticum subsp. ellacombianum

= Phedimus ellacombeanus =

Species of succulent flowering plant

Phedimus ellacombeanus, commonly known as yellow stonecrop, is a species of succulent native to Japan and Korea. Formerly known as Sedum ellacombianum or Sedum kamtschaticum subsp. ellacombianum. It is bears compact mounds of bright green leaves and clusters of yellow, star-shaped flowers that appear in the spring. It is often mistaken for the closely related Phedimus kamtschaticus.

== Description ==
Phedimus ellacombeanus forms low-growing, compact mounds of bright green leaves with thick and fleshy textures. The leaves have scalloped edges and can grow up to 4 cm in length and up to 2 cm in width. The plant itself can reach a height of up to 15 cm. In the spring, the flowers emerge just above the foliage.

== Nomenclature ==
Phedimus ellacombeanus (Praeger) 't Hart was first described by Praeger (1917), as "Sedum Ellacombianum, sp. nov." (p. 41), then on the subsequent page saying that it was "Named in memory of Canon H. N. Ellacombe, keenest of gardeners and kindest of friends" (etc). As such, the suffix -ānum (in the neuter) on the species epithet was added to a noun stem to form an adjective, hence "of" or "pertaining to" Ellacombe, meaning Ellacombe's Sedum. However, the internal spelling of the species epithet has differed across later resources, some consistent to the original "ellacombian-", others using altered "ellacombean-". Per the applicable Code for Nomenclature (Article 60.8 [d]) then, "If the personal name ends with a vowel, adjectival epithets are formed by adding ‑an- plus the nominative singular inflection appropriate to the gender of the generic name". In accordance, "ellacombean-" has been subsequently widely adopted as the accepted spelling.
