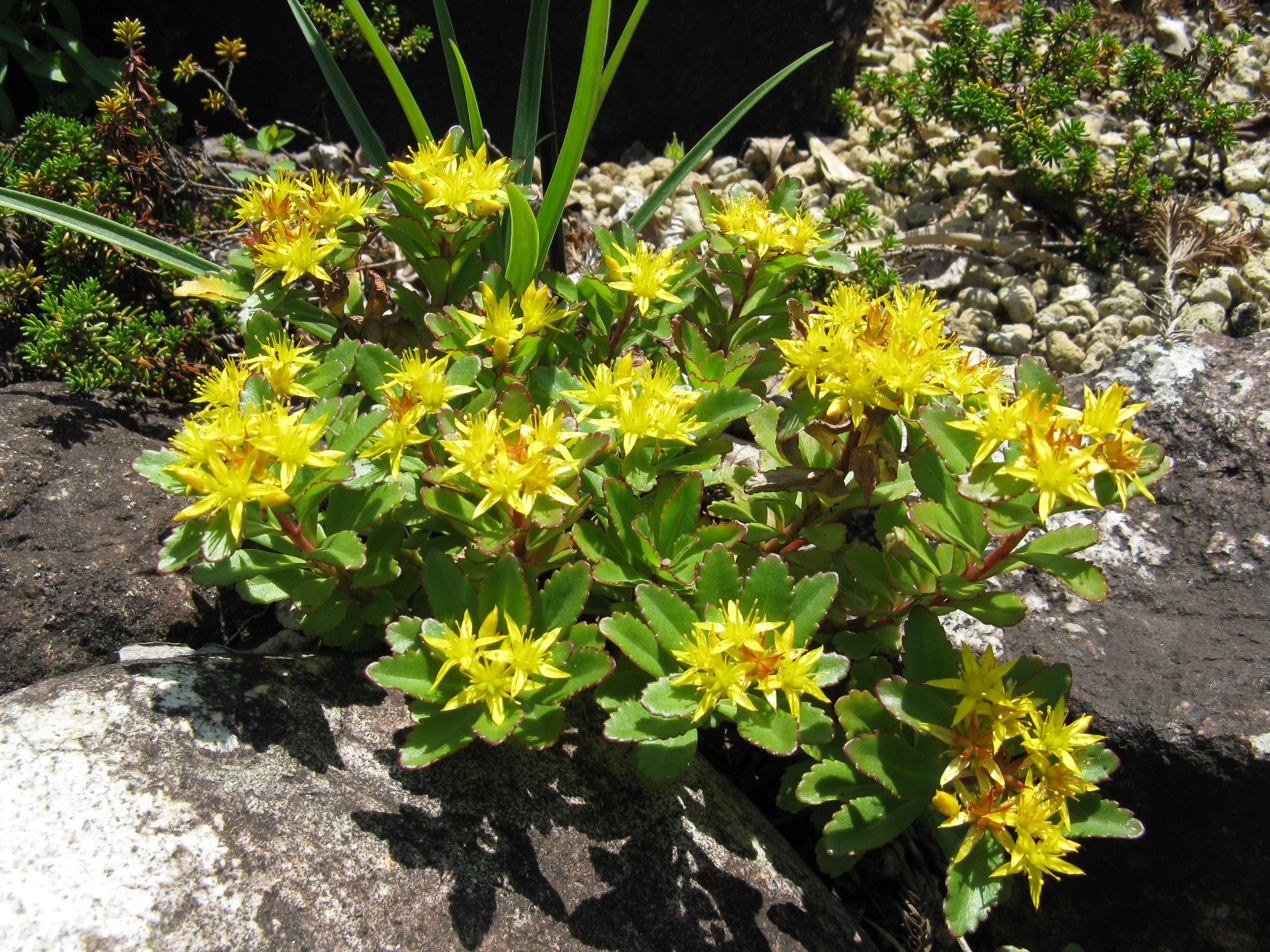
- Aizopsis aizoon

Scientific classification
- Kingdom: Plantae
- Clade: Embryophytes
- Clade: Tracheophytes
- Clade: Angiosperms
- Clade: Eudicots
- Order: Saxifragales
- Family: Crassulaceae
- Genus: Aizopsis; Grulich

Type species
- Aizopsis aizoon

= Aizopsis =

Genus of flowering plants

Aizopsis is a genus of the succulent family Crassulaceae (stonecrop family), found in Asia.

== Description ==
Flowers yellow, chromosome numbers, x=16.

== Taxonomy ==
In 1978, Ohba divided up the very large and cosmopolitan genus Sedum, placing Sedum aizoon and allied species into Sedum subgenus Aizoon. In 1995, he segregated these species into a separate genus, Aizopsis. However, other authors included these species in another segregate, Phedimus, as subgenus Aizoon. Subsequent molecular phylogenetic analysis established Aizopsis as a sister group to Phedimus, which with distinguishing characteristics justified their retention as a separate genus, although the distinction has not been universally adopted.

== Distribution ==
Original range from east Asia (highest diversity) and northeast Asia to central Asia (one species). Now also naturalized in Europe and North America.

== Bibliography ==
- Hart, H. 't; Eggli, U., eds. (1995). Evolution and systematics of the Crassulaceae (23rd Congress of the International Organization for Succulent Plant Study, Wageningen, Netherlands, August 20th, 1994). Leiden: Backhuys. ISBN 978-9073348462. OCLC 34335028.
- Thiede, J; Eggli, U (2007). "Crassulaceae". In Kubitzki, Klaus (ed.). Berberidopsidales, Buxales, Crossosomatales, Fabales p.p., Geraniales, Gunnerales, Myrtales p.p., Proteales, Saxifragales, Vitales, Zygophyllales, Clusiaceae Alliance, Passifloraceae Alliance, Dilleniaceae, Huaceae, Picramniaceae, Sabiaceae. pp. 83–119. ISBN 978-3540322146. (full text at ResearchGate)
- Gontcharova, S. B.; Artyukova, E. V.; Gontcharov, A. A. (June 2006). "Phylogenetic relationships among members of the subfamily Sedoideae (Crassulaceae) inferred from the ITS region sequences of nuclear rDNA" (PDF). Russian Journal of Genetics. 42 (6): 654–661. doi:10.1134/S102279540606010X. S2CID 33249840. Archived from the original (PDF) on 2017-08-09.
- Grulich, Vit (1984). "Generic division of Sedoideae in Europe and the adjacent regions" (PDF). Preslia. 56: 29–45.
- Hart, H. 't (1995). Infrafamilial and generic classification of the Crassulaceae. pp. 159–172., in Hart & Eggli (1995)
- Ohba, H (1978). "Generic and infrageneric classification of the old world sedoideae crassulaceae". Journal of the Faculty of Science University of Tokyo Section III Botany 12(4): 139-193. 12 (4): 139–193.
- Ohba, Hideaki (1995). Systematic problems of Asian Sedoideae. pp. 151–158., in Hart & Eggli (1995)
- Ohba, Hideaki; Bartholomew, Bruce M.; Turland, Nicholas J.; Kunjun, Fu (2000). "New Combinations in Phedimus (Crassulaceae)". Novon. 10 (4): 400–402. doi:10.2307/3392995. JSTOR 3392995.
