= Glyptopetalum zeylanicum =

Scientific classification
- Kingdom: Plantae
- Clade: Tracheophytes
- Clade: Angiosperms
- Clade: Eudicots
- Clade: Rosids
- Order: Celastrales
- Family: Celastraceae
- Genus: Glyptopetalum
- Species: G. zeylanicum

Binomial name
- Glyptopetalum zeylanicum Thwaites

Species of tree

Glyptopetalum zeylanicum is a tree species in the family Celastraceae native to Peninsular India and Sri Lanka. The specific epithet zeylanicum refers to the species being native to the island of Sri Lanka.

== Description ==
Glyptopetalum zeylanicum grows as a small understory tree up to 5 metres (16 ft) tall. Its branches are slender and pubescent.
