= Glyptopetalum quadrangulare =

Conservation status
- Least Concern (IUCN 3.1)

Scientific classification
- Kingdom: Plantae
- Clade: Embryophytes
- Clade: Tracheophytes
- Clade: Spermatophytes
- Clade: Angiosperms
- Clade: Eudicots
- Clade: Rosids
- Order: Celastrales
- Family: Celastraceae
- Genus: Glyptopetalum
- Species: G. quadrangulare

Binomial name
- Glyptopetalum quadrangulare Prain ex King

Species of flowering plant

Glyptopetalum quadrangulare is a plant in the family Celastraceae. The specific epithet quadrangulare means 'four-angled', referring to the winged twigs.

== Description ==
Glyptopetalum quadrangulare grows as a shrub or tree up to 5 metres (20 ft) tall with a diameter of up to 5 centimetres (2 in). The flowers are greenish-yellow. The roundish fruits measure up to 2 cm (1 in) in diameter.

== Distribution and habitat ==
Glyptopetalum quadrangulare grows naturally in Myanmar, Thailand, Cambodia, Vietnam, Sumatra, Peninsular Malaysia and Borneo. Its habitat is lowland forests.
