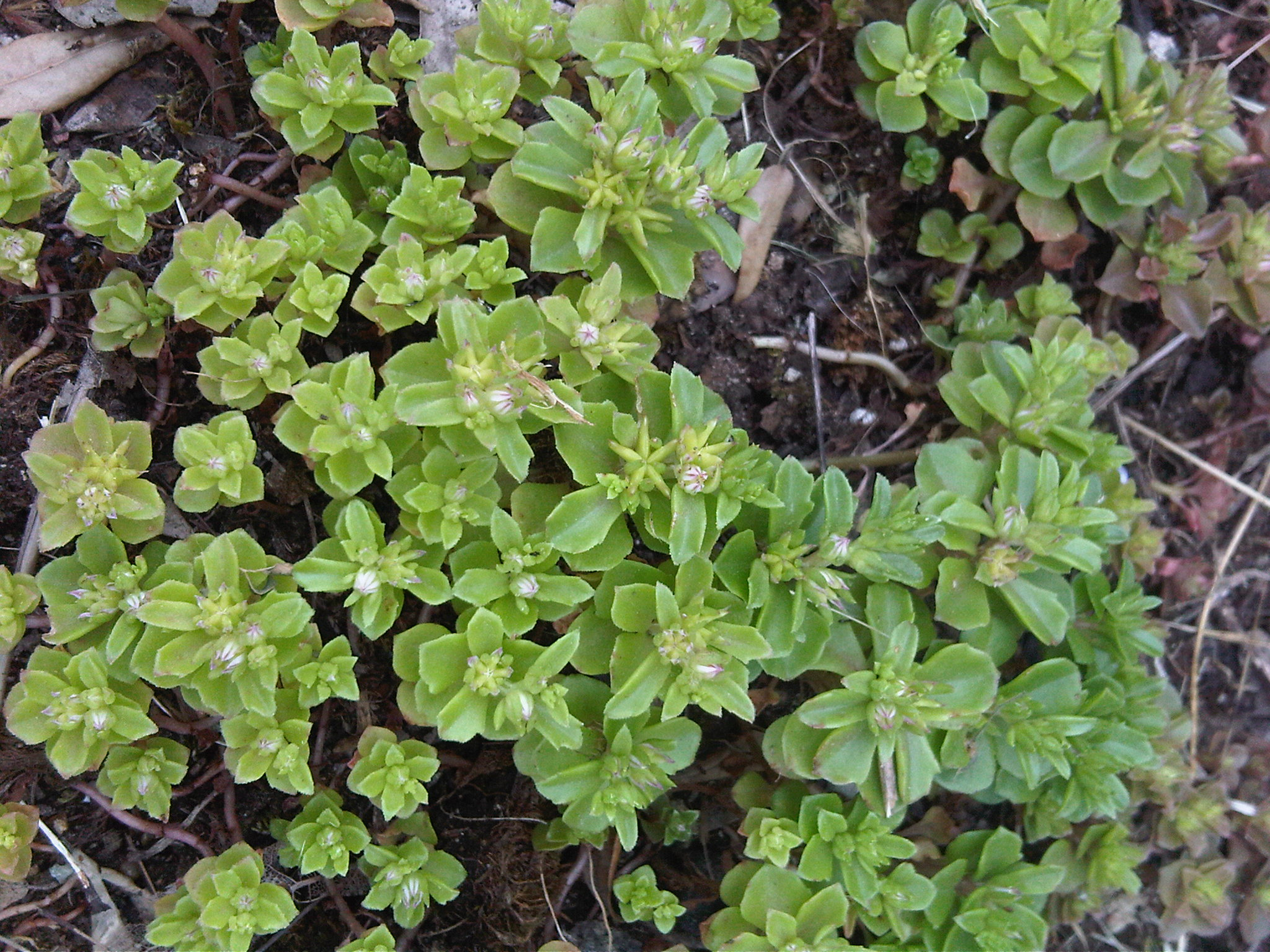

Scientific classification
- Kingdom: Plantae
- Clade: Tracheophytes
- Clade: Angiosperms
- Clade: Eudicots
- Order: Saxifragales
- Family: Crassulaceae
- Genus: Phedimus
- Species: P. stellatus

Binomial name
- Phedimus stellatus (L.) Raf.

Synonyms
- List: Asterosedum stellatum (L.) Grulich; Sedum stellatum L.; Phedimus uniflorus (Raf.) Raf.; Sedum deltoideum Ten.; Sedum uniflorum Raf.

= Phedimus stellatus =

Species of plant

Phedimus stellatus is a species of plant in the family Crassulaceae.
