= Quercus repandifolia =

Conservation status
- Vulnerable (IUCN 3.1)

Scientific classification
- Kingdom: Plantae
- Clade: Embryophytes
- Clade: Tracheophytes
- Clade: Angiosperms
- Clade: Eudicots
- Clade: Rosids
- Order: Fagales
- Family: Fagaceae
- Genus: Quercus
- Subgenus: Quercus subg. Cerris
- Section: Quercus sect. Cyclobalanopsis
- Species: Q. repandifolia

Binomial name
- Quercus repandifolia J.C.Liao

Synonyms
- Cyclobalanopsis repandifolia (J.C.Liao) J.C.Liao

Species of flowering plant

Quercus repandifolia is a species of oak. It is a tree endemic to southeastern Taiwan.

The species was described by Jih Ching Liao in 1968. It is considered by some a synonym of Quercus glauca.
