= Piper kawakamii =

Scientific classification
- Kingdom: Plantae
- Clade: Tracheophytes
- Clade: Angiosperms
- Clade: Magnoliids
- Order: Piperales
- Family: Piperaceae
- Genus: Piper
- Species: P. kawakamii

Binomial name
- Piper kawakamii Hayata (1911)

Species of flowering plant

Piper kawakamii (Chinese: 恒春風藤; pinyin: Héngchūn fēngténg or 恆春胡椒; Héngchūn hújiāo), also known as the Kawakamii pepper, is a species of flowering plant in the family Piperaceae. It is native to southern Taiwan and the northern Philippines. In Taiwan plant is mainly distributed in the Hengchun Peninsula. It was collected by Takiya Kawakami at the Kuraru Community (currently known as the Kenting National Park), on July 2, 1906. In 1911, the plant was published by Bunzō Hayata as a new species. The type specimen of this plant is being preserved in the Botanical Gardens, Graduate School of Science, the University of Tokyo, Japan. (Note: 採集號:1645；館號:T00305) and the Herbarium of Taiwan Forest Research Institute (Note: 採集號:1645；館號:7082)

== Description ==
The stem is stoloniferous and has climbing property with smooth surface and striae. Roots grow from the node area. Leaves grow in alternate pattern with hairless paper texture. They are oval to egg shaped with length between 8–18 cm (3.1–7.1 in) and width of 3.5 to 8.5 cm (1.4 to 3.3 in). The border of the leaf is smooth with rounded to blunt base, while the tip is short with gradual sharpness. Hairless petiole, length: 0.4–1 cm (0.16–0.39 in). Opposite leaves and inflorescence. Unisexual flower and the male inflorescence: vertical spike inflorescence with length between 4–5 cm (1.6–2.0 in). The length of the peduncle is approximately 1.5 cm (0.59 in). The female inflorescence is vertical spike inflorescence as well with the length between 2–3 cm (0.79–1.18 in). The length of the peduncle is approximately 1.5 cm (0.59 in). The red berries are the fruit which grow on the rachis.

== Taxonomy ==
This plant species was collected by Takiya Kawakami at the Kuraru Community (currently known as the Kenting National Park), on July 2, 1906. In 1911, the plant was named by Bunzō Hayata as a new species in the summary journal article in Tokyo University of Science.

== Distribution and habitats ==
It is mainly distributed in the low altitude area of Southern Taiwan. They usually grow in the coral reef zone, between the height of 10–300 m (33–984 ft) above sea level. The Hengchun Peninsula is their chief area of distribution, mainly at the Kenting National Park. On the other hand, it can also be seen at Dapingding, Guanshan and Shoushan in Kaoshung.

== Artificial breeding and conservation status ==
Least Concern (LC), currently no artificial breeding.

== Utilization of the habitat ==
It is one of the food sources for the Formosan sika deers.
