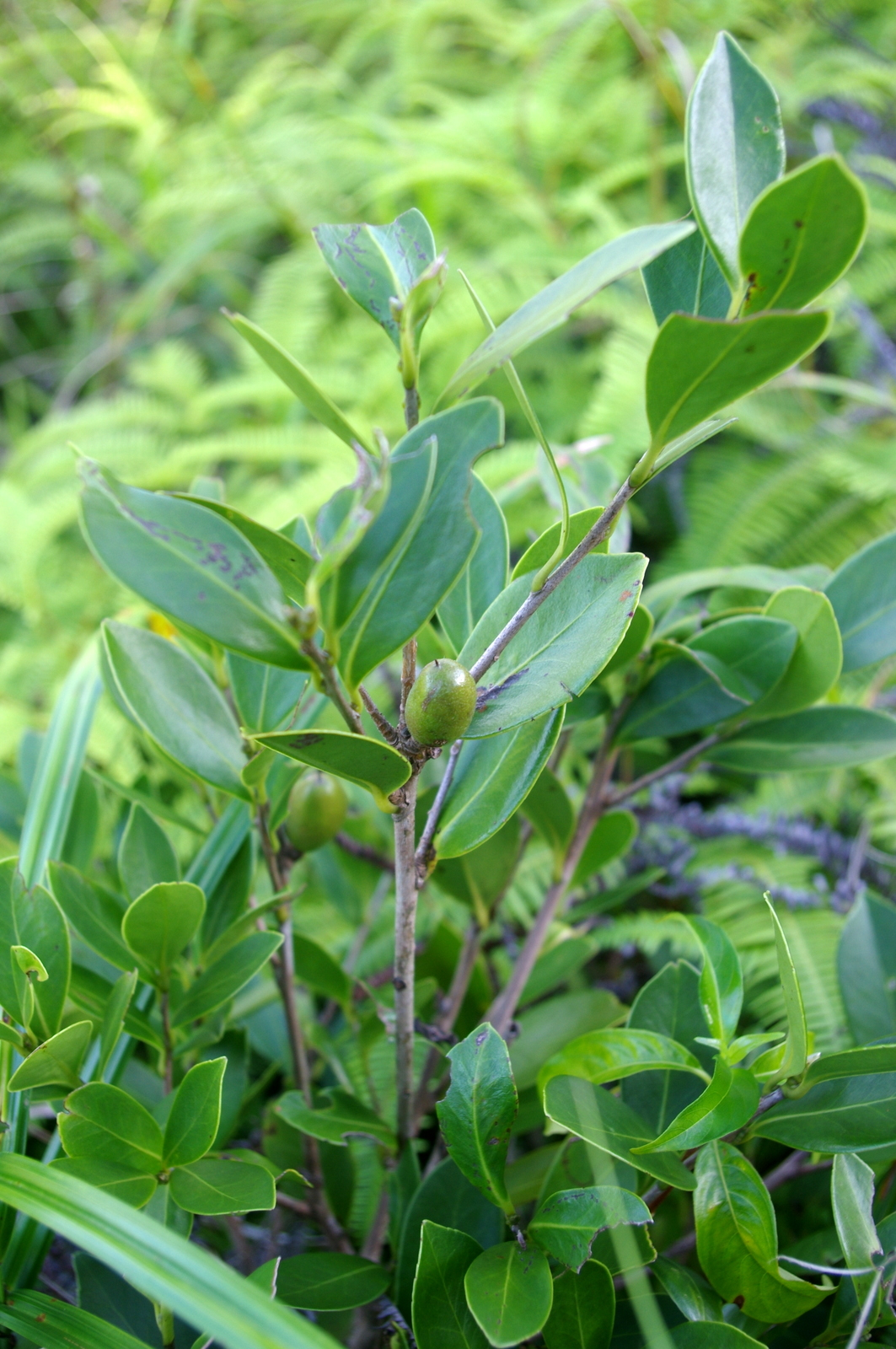

Conservation status
- Near Threatened (IUCN 3.1)

Scientific classification
- Kingdom: Plantae
- Clade: Tracheophytes
- Clade: Angiosperms
- Clade: Eudicots
- Clade: Asterids
- Order: Ericales
- Family: Theaceae
- Genus: Camellia
- Species: C. hengchunensis

Binomial name
- Camellia hengchunensis Chang

= Camellia hengchunensis =

Species of flowering plant

Camellia hengchunensis is a species of plant in the family Theaceae. It is endemic to Taiwan.
