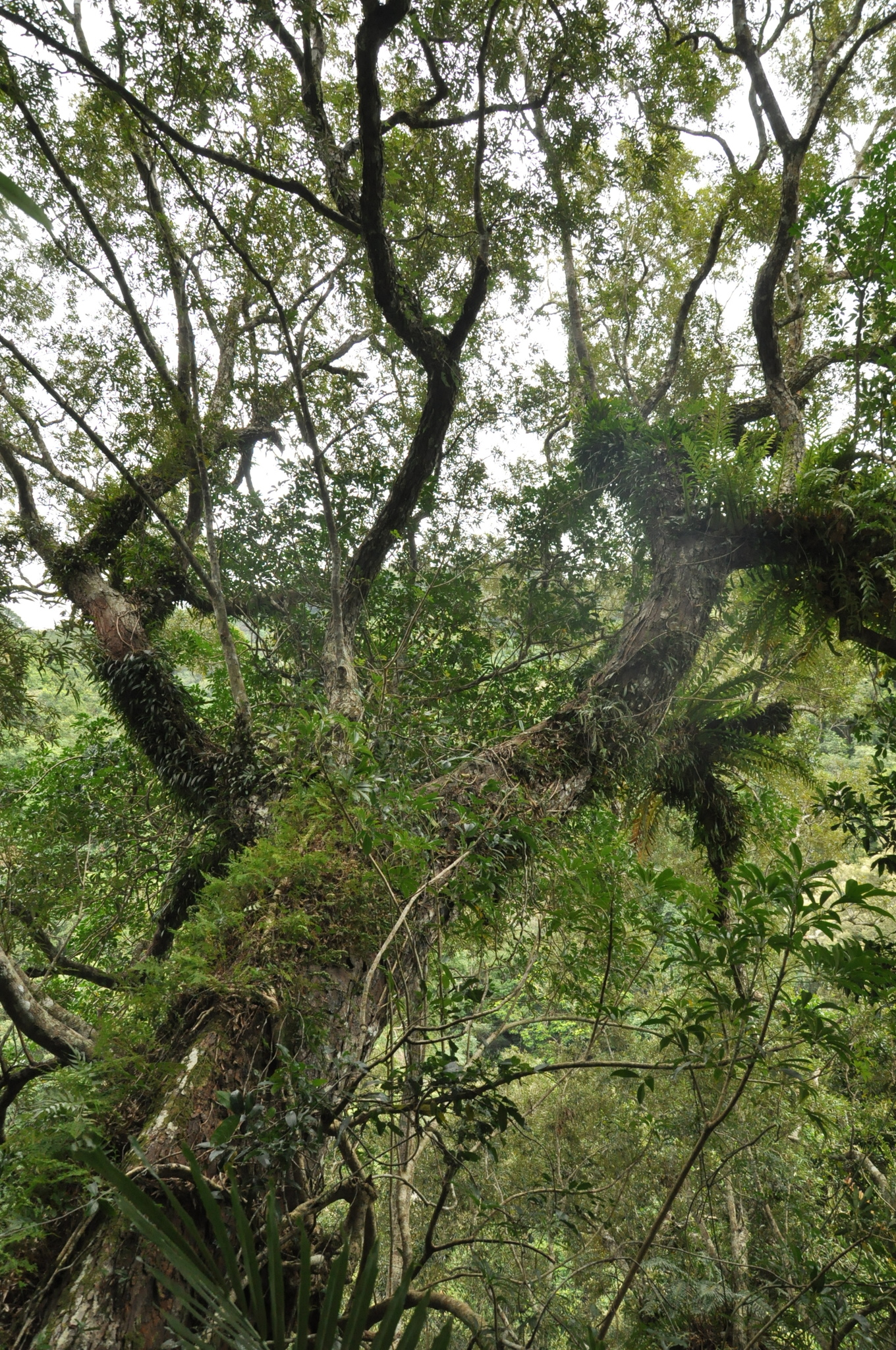

Conservation status
- Near Threatened (IUCN 3.1)

Scientific classification
- Kingdom: Plantae
- Clade: Embryophytes
- Clade: Tracheophytes
- Clade: Spermatophytes
- Clade: Angiosperms
- Clade: Eudicots
- Clade: Rosids
- Order: Fagales
- Family: Fagaceae
- Genus: Quercus
- Subgenus: Quercus subg. Cerris
- Section: Quercus sect. Cyclobalanopsis
- Species: Q. hypophaea

Binomial name
- Quercus hypophaea Hayata 1913

Synonyms
- Cyclobalanopsis hypophaea (Hayata) Kudô; Cyclobalanus hypophaea (Hayata) Nakai; Lithocarpus hypophaeus (Hayata) Hayata; Pasania hypophaea (Hayata) H.L.Li

= Quercus hypophaea =

Species of oak tree

Quercus hypophaea is an uncommon species of tree in the beech family Fagaceae. It has been found only in Taiwan. It is placed in subgenus Cerris, section Cyclobalanopsis.

Quercus hypophaea is a tree up to 18 meters tall with whitish twigs. Leaves can be as much as 10 cm long.
