= Glyptopetalum pallidifolium =

Conservation status
- Critically Endangered (IUCN 2.3)

Scientific classification
- Kingdom: Plantae
- Clade: Embryophytes
- Clade: Tracheophytes
- Clade: Angiosperms
- Clade: Eudicots
- Clade: Rosids
- Order: Celastrales
- Family: Celastraceae
- Genus: Glyptopetalum
- Species: G. pallidifolium

Binomial name
- Glyptopetalum pallidifolium (Hayata) Q.R.Liu & S.Y.Meng

Synonyms
- Euonymus pallidifolius Hayata

Species of flowering plant

Glyptopetalum pallidifolium, synonym Euonymus pallidifolius, is an ornamental shrub in the family Celastraceae. It is endemic to Taiwan. It is threatened by habitat loss and considered critically endangered. Glyptopetalum pallidifolium grows in evergreen forests on raised coral reefs. The plant's entire remaining habitat is located in the Kenting National Park in Taiwan.
