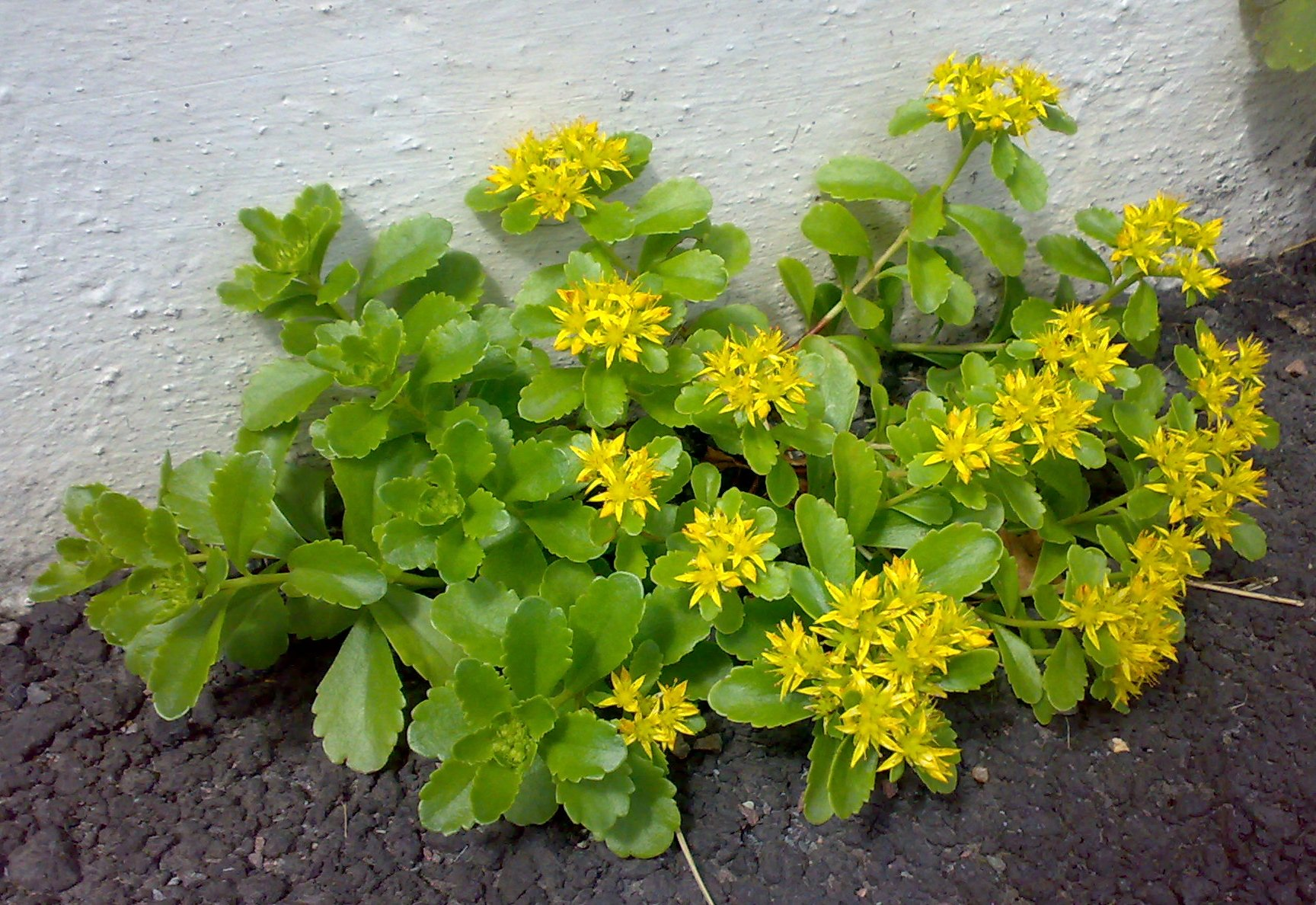

Scientific classification
- Kingdom: Plantae
- Clade: Tracheophytes
- Clade: Angiosperms
- Clade: Eudicots
- Order: Saxifragales
- Family: Crassulaceae
- Genus: Phedimus
- Species: P. kamtschaticus

Binomial name
- Phedimus kamtschaticus (Fisch.) 't Hart

Synonyms
- List: Aizopsis florifera (Praeger) P.V.Heath; Aizopsis kurilensis (Vorosch.) S.B.Gontch.; Aizopsis takesimensis (Nakai) P.V.Heath; Phedimus florifer (Praeger) 't Hart; Phedimus takesimensis (Nakai) 't Hart; Sedum floriferum Praeger; Sedum kamtschaticum Fisch.; Sedum kurilense Vorosch.; Sedum sikokianum subsp. kurilense (Vorosch.) Vorosch.; Sedum takesimense Nakai

= Phedimus kamtschaticus =

Species of succulent plant

Phedimus kamtschaticus, the orange stonecrop, is a species of flowering plant in the family Crassulaceae. It is a low-growing herbaceous perennial native to eastern Russia, northeastern China, Korea, and Japan. The species is commonly grown as an ornamental plant, and has escaped cultivation in Europe and the US.

== Description ==
Phedimus kamtschaticus is a succulent, clump-forming herbaceous perennial plant. It has a thick, woody, and branched rootstock. The stems grow mostly straight, reaching 15 to 40 cm tall, and may sometimes have tiny, wart-like bumps. The leaves grow either one by one along the stem or in pairs, and rarely in groups of three. They are narrow and spoon-shaped or broad and oval, measuring 2.5–7 cm long and 0.5–3 cm wide. The base of each leaf is narrow and tapers to a point, while the edges near the tip may have small, rounded or sharp teeth. The tip of the leaf is blunt or rounded. The foliage is semi-evergreen; it mostly disappears through winter.

The flowers are star-shaped and produced in early summer, growing at the very end of the stem. Each flower has five unevenly sized parts. The small green sepals (leaf-like structures that protect the flower bud) are 3–4 mm long, narrow, and have a broad base with a blunt tip. The yellow petals are 6–8 mm long, narrow and pointed, with a noticeable ridge running along the underside. Their tips taper to a fine point, sometimes with a tiny extension.

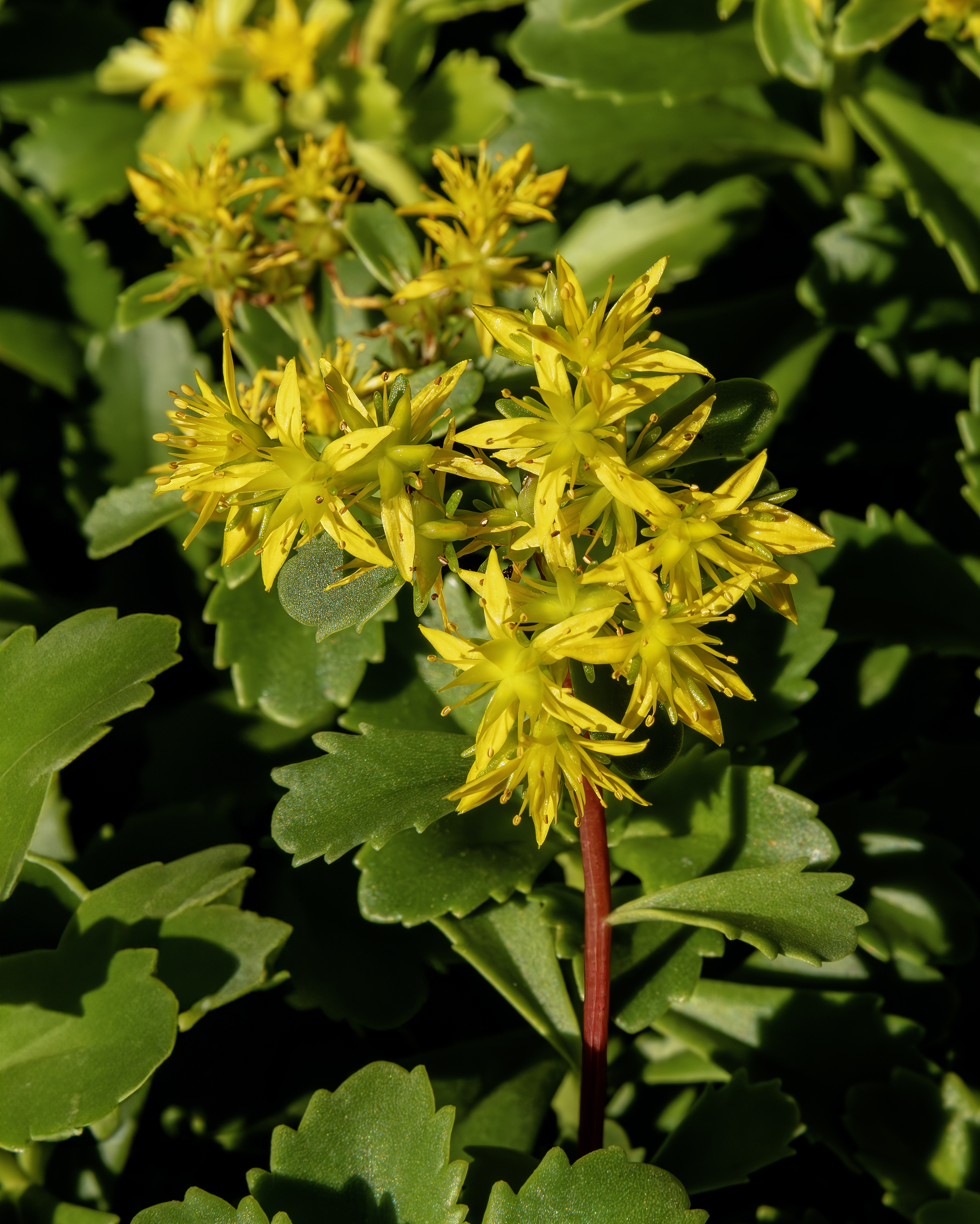
Star-shaped flowers are borne on stems in the summer.

The flower contains 10 stamens (the pollen-producing parts), which are slightly shorter than the petals, with orange anthers at the tips. At the base of the flower, there are tiny, four-sided nectar glands. The carpels (which develop into seed pods) stand upright and are about the same length as the petals or slightly shorter. They have a slight bulge on the inner side and are fused together at the base for about 2 mm. In late summer, the flowers give way to follicles (dry seed pods) that spread out in a star-like, horizontal pattern. The fruits turn russet red in autumn. The seeds themselves are tiny, brown, and oval-shaped. The specific epithet, kamtschaticus, refers to its provenance from the Kamchatka Peninsula.

== Distribution and habitat ==
Phedimus kamtschaticus is found on rocky slopes at elevations ranging from 600 to 1,800 meters. The species is distributed throughout several provinces in northern China, such as Hebei, Heilongjiang, Jilin, Liaoning, and Inner Mongolia. Beyond China, it also occurs in Japan, Korea, and Russia. In Russia, this species is found across a broad range, including Amur, Kamchatka, Khabarovsk, the Kuril Islands, Magadan, Primorsky Krai, Sakhalin, and Yakutia.

Phedimus kamtschaticus has been introduced to the US state of New York, Norway, Germany, Austria, and the Baltic states. The species sometimes persists as a remnant of cultivation or escapes as a discarded garden plant, appearing along roadsides, railway embankments, and disturbed ground. It occasionally spreads by self-seeding. Its first documented occurrence in the wild in the United Kingdom was in 1981 at Slepe Heath, Dorset. Although its distribution remains patchy, records suggest it is becoming more widespread.

== Uses ==
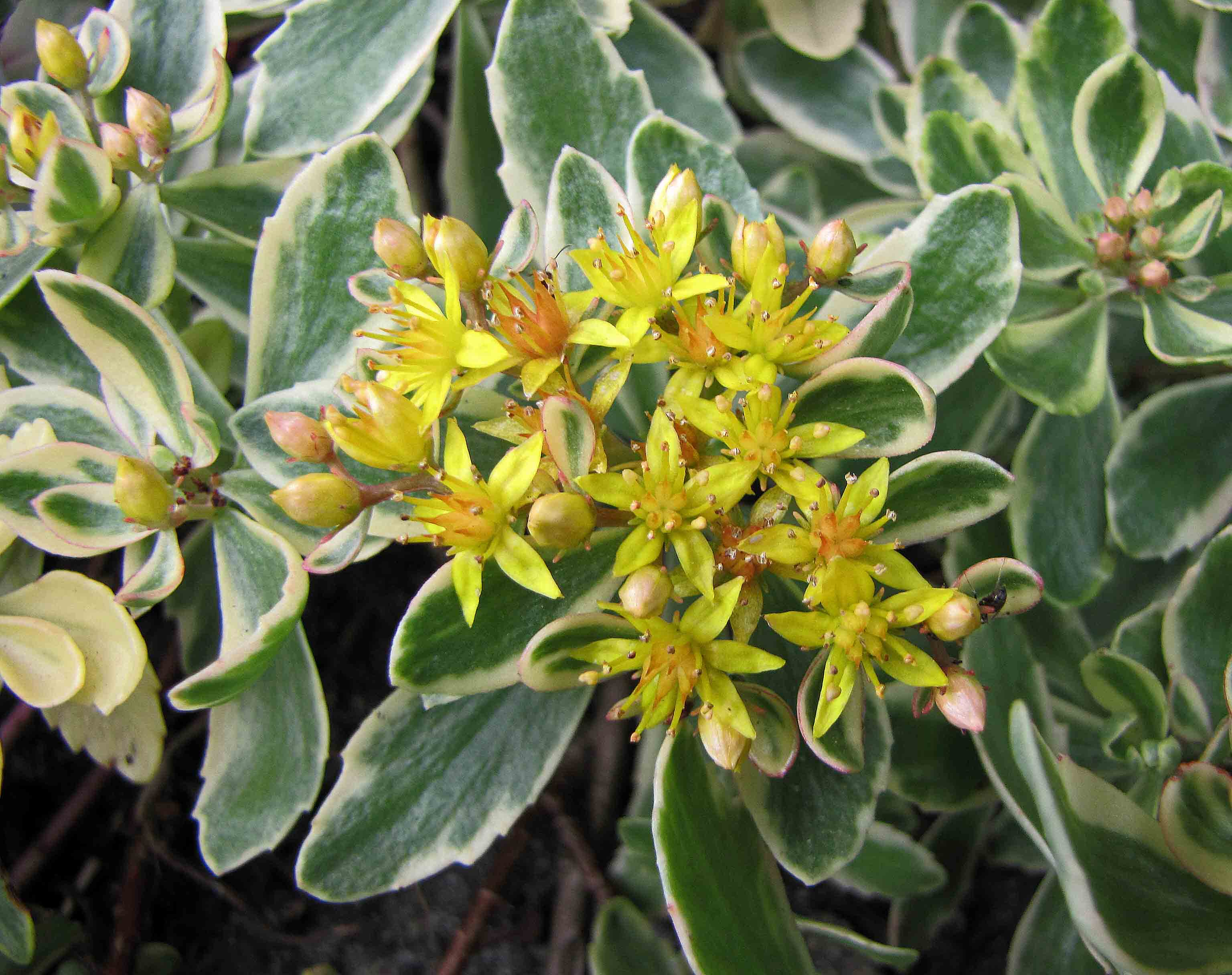
Several cultivars of Phedimus kamtschaticus are available in trade, including a variegated one.

Phedimus kamtschaticus is easily grown in well-draining soil with moderate to low moisture and full sunlight. It adapts well to sandy or rocky ground and can withstand heat and nutrient-poor conditions. Proper drainage is essential for healthy growth, but the species tolerates much more moisture in the soil than other stonecrops; it is also less drought tolerant. It is commonly used in containers and rock gardens, but may also be grown as a small area groundcover and in green roof plantings.

Under its synonym Sedum kamtschaticum, it has gained the Royal Horticultural Society's Award of Garden Merit. In addition, the putative variety Sedum kamtschaticum var. ellacombeanum and the 'Variegatum' cultivar have also gained the award. 'Weihenstephaner Gold' (named after Hochschule Weihenstephan-Triesdorf) is particularly popular among commercial growers. All the cultivars have yellow blooms, but the flowers of 'Weihenstaphaner Gold' gain pink tones as they age.

Phedimus kamtschaticus is edible. Young leaves and stems may be cooked. In Chinese herbal medicine, P. kamtschaticus is applied freshly crushed to wounds, burns, snakebites, or other injuries to ease pain, reduce swelling, and improve blood flow.
