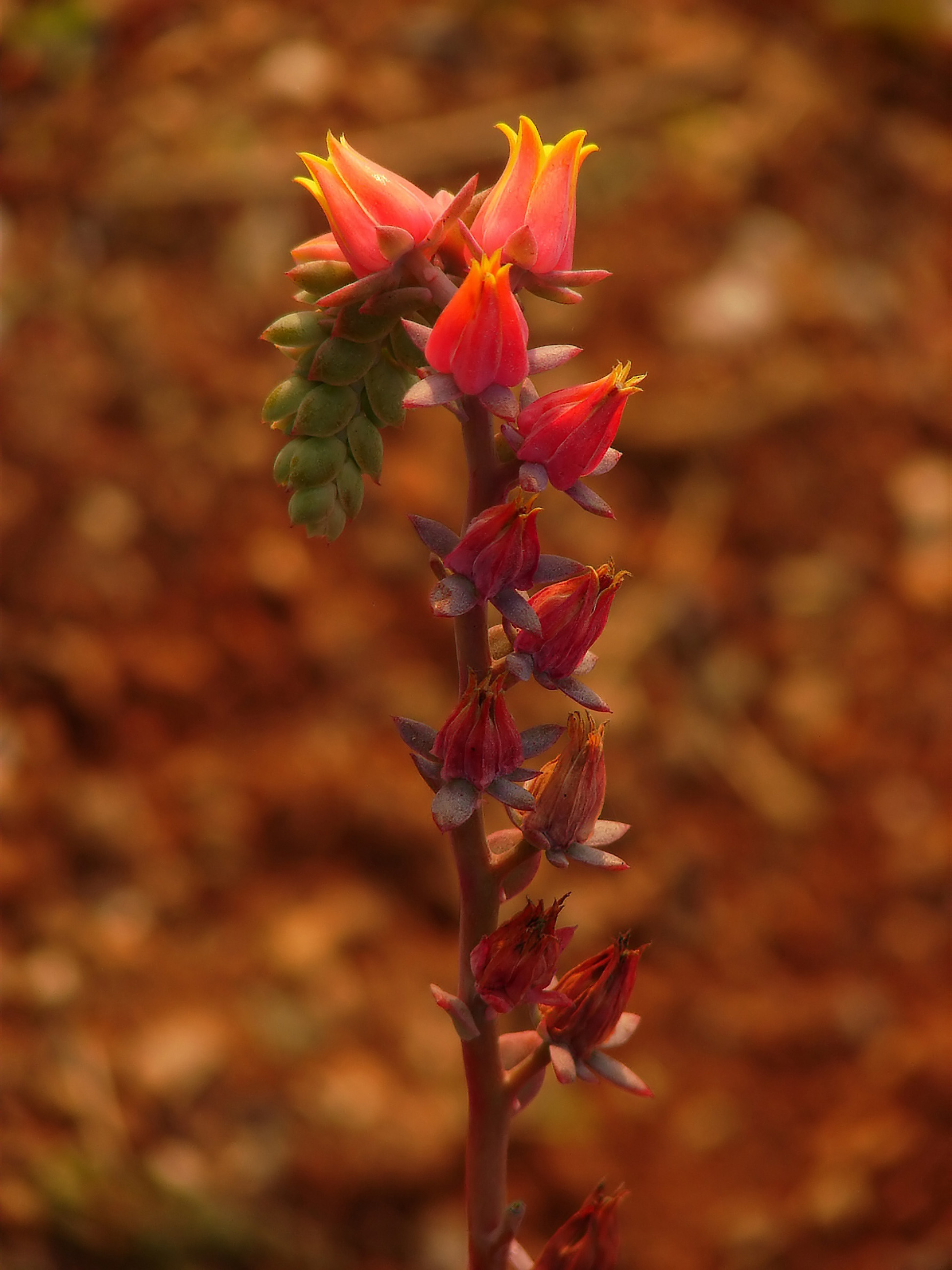
- Rosularia flowers

Scientific classification
- Kingdom: Plantae
- Clade: Tracheophytes
- Clade: Angiosperms
- Clade: Eudicots
- Order: Saxifragales
- Family: Crassulaceae
- Subfamily: Sempervivoideae
- Tribe: Sedeae
- Genus: Rosularia (DC) Stapf

Species
- See text

Synonyms
- Sempervivella Stapf

= Rosularia =

Genus of flowering plants

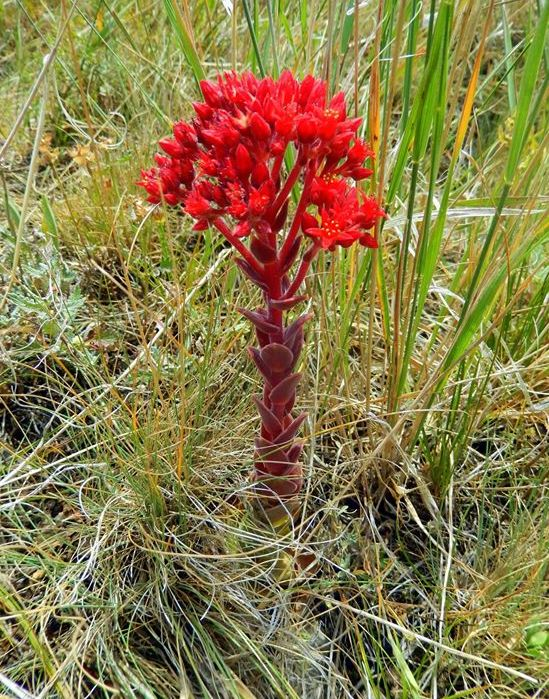
Rosularia sempervivoides

Rosularia is a small genus of the family Crassulaceae. It includes about 28-35 species from Europe, the Himalayas, and northern Africa.

== Taxonomy ==
Rosularia was originally described by De Candolle (1828) as a section of the genus Umbilicus, and raised to the level of genus by Stapf (1923) Thus the genus bears the botanical authority (DC) Stapf of both authors.

In 1930, Berger included it in family Crassulaceae subfamily Sedoideae, as one of 9 genera. He further divided it into two sections (Eu-Rosularia and Ornithogalopsis) and further series, transferring some species of Sedum to it. Since then, a number of species have been transferred in and out of the genus, including S. sempervivoides, which at one stage was placed in Prometheum. The genus Sempervivella was submerged in Rosularia. The genus is now placed within the Leucosedum clade, tribe Sedeae, subfamily Sempervivoideae of the Crassulaceae, but is embedded within Sedum paraphyletically.

=== Species ===
Rosularia contains about 28 species. The following species and subspecies were accepted by The Plant List (2013):

- Rosularia adenotricha (Wall. ex Edgew.) C.-A. Jansson
  - Rosularia adenotricha subsp. viguieri (Raym.-Hamet) C.-A. Jansson
- Rosularia aizoon (Fenzl) A. Berger
- Rosularia alpestris (Kar. & Kir.) Boriss
  - Rosularia alpestris subsp. marnieri(Raymond-Hamet ex H. Ohba) Eggli
- Rosularia blepharophylla Eggli
- Rosularia borissovae U.P.Pratov
- Rosularia chrysantha (Boiss. & Heldr. ex Boiss.) Takhtajan
- Rosularia cypria (Holmboe) Meikle
- Rosularia davisii Muirhead
- Rosularia elymaitica (Boiss. & Hausskn. ex Boiss.) A. Berger
- Rosularia glabra (Regel & Winkl.) A.Berger
- Rosularia globulariifolia (Fenzl) A. Berger
- Rosularia haussknechtii (Boiss. & Reut. ex Boiss.) A. Berger
- Rosularia jaccardiana (Maire & Wilczek) H. Ohba
- Rosularia libanotica (L.) Sam.
- Rosularia lineata (Boiss.) A.Berger
- Rosularia lutea Boriss.
- Rosularia pallida (Schott & Kotschy) Stapf
- Rosularia pallidiflora (Holmboe) Meikle
- Rosularia persica (Boiss.) A. Berger
- Rosularia pilosa (Fischer ex M. Bieberstein) Boriss.
- Rosularia platyphylla (Schrenk) A.Berger
- Rosularia radicosa (Boiss. & Hohen.) Eggli
- Rosularia rechingeri C.-A. Jansson
- Rosularia rosulata (Edgew.) H. Ohba
- Rosularia schischkinii Boriss.
- Rosularia sedoides (Decne.) H. Ohba
- Rosularia semiensis (J. Gay ex A. Richard) H. Ohba
- Rosularia sempervivoides (Fischer ex M. Bieberstein) Boriss.
- Rosularia serpentinica (Werderm.) Muirhead
- Rosularia serrata (L.) A.Berger
- Rosularia subspicata (Freyn) Boriss.

== Distribution and habitat ==
Rosularia is found in arid and semi-arid regions from North Africa (Morocco, Ethiopia), through the eastern Mediterranean to Central Asia (north of Tien Shan and east of W Himalaya), including Pakistan.

== Ecology ==
Rosularia is an important larval host for the Central Asian butterfly Parnassius apollonius.

== Uses ==
A number of species are cultivated as ornamental garden plants, and have been used in traditional medicine.

== Bibliography ==
Books

- Berger, A. (1930). "Crassulacaeae". In Engler, Adolf; Prantl, Karl Anton (eds.). Die Natürlichen Pflanzenfamilien. Vol. 18A. Leipzig: Verlag von Wilhelm Engelmann. pp. 352–483.
- de Candolle, A. P. (1828). "Crassulaceae". Prodromus systematis naturalis regni vegetabilis, sive, Enumeratio contracta ordinum generum specierumque plantarum huc usque cognitarium, juxta methodi naturalis, normas digesta. Vol. 3. Paris: Treuttel et Würtz. pp. 381–414.
- Tuzov, V. K. (1997). Guide to the Butterflies of Russia and Adjacent Territories: Vol. 1 Hesperiidae, Papilionidae, Pieridae, Satyridae. Coronet Books Incorporated. ISBN 978-954-642-018-3.
- Thiede, J; Eggli, U (2007). "Crassulaceae". In Kubitzki, Klaus (ed.). Berberidopsidales, Buxales, Crossosomatales, Fabales p.p., Geraniales, Gunnerales, Myrtales p.p., Proteales, Saxifragales, Vitales, Zygophyllales, Clusiaceae Alliance, Passifloraceae Alliance, Dilleniaceae, Huaceae, Picramniaceae, Sabiaceae. Springer. pp. 83–119. ISBN 978-3540322146. (full text at ResearchGate)

Articles

- Mayuzumi, Shinzo; Ohba, Hideaki (2004). "The Phylogenetic Position of Eastern Asian Sedoideae (Crassulaceae) Inferred from Chloroplast and Nuclear DNA Sequences". Systematic Botany. 29 (3): 587–598. doi:10.1600/0363644041744329. ISSN 0363-6445. JSTOR 25063994. S2CID 84319808.
- Ohba, H (1978). "Generic and infrageneric classification of the old world sedoideae crassulaceae". Journal of the Faculty of Science University of Tokyo Section III Botany 12(4): 139-193. 12 (4): 139–193.
- Sarwar, Ghulam Rasool; Qaiser, Muhammad (2012). "A numerical taxonomy of the genus Rosularia (DC.) Stapf from Pakistan and Kashmir" (PDF). Pak. J. Bot. 44 (1): 349–354. S2CID 32097729. Archived from the original (PDF) on 2019-10-01.
- Stapf, Otto (1923). "Sempervivella alba". Curtis's Botanical Magazine. 149: 1–4.

Websites

- TPL (2013). "The Plant List Version 1.1: Rosularia". Royal Botanic Gardens, Kew and Missouri Botanical Garden.
- WFO (2019). "Rosularia (DC.) Stapf". World Flora Online.
- "Tropicos". Missouri Botanical Garden. 2019.
- "Rosularia adenotricha". Royal Horticultural Society. 2019.
