= Jeronimoa =

Scientific classification
- Kingdom: Plantae
- Clade: Tracheophytes
- Clade: Angiosperms
- Clade: Eudicots
- Order: Saxifragales
- Family: Crassulaceae
- Subfamily: Sempervivoideae
- Tribe: Sedeae
- Genus: Jeronimoa; A.Vázquez, Islas & Rosales
- Species: J. cuicatecana

Binomial name
- Jeronimoa cuicatecana (J.Reyes, Joel Pérez & Brachet) A.Vázquez, Islas & Rosales

Synonyms
- Echeveria cuicatecana J.Reyes, Joel Pérez & Brachet (2004); Pachyphytum cuicatecanum (J.Reyes, Joel Pérez & Brachet) Kimnach

Genus of flowering plants

Jeronimoa is a genus of flowering plants in the family Crassulaceae. It includes a single species, Jeronimoa cuicatecana, a succulent subshrub native to Oaxaca state in southern Mexico.
