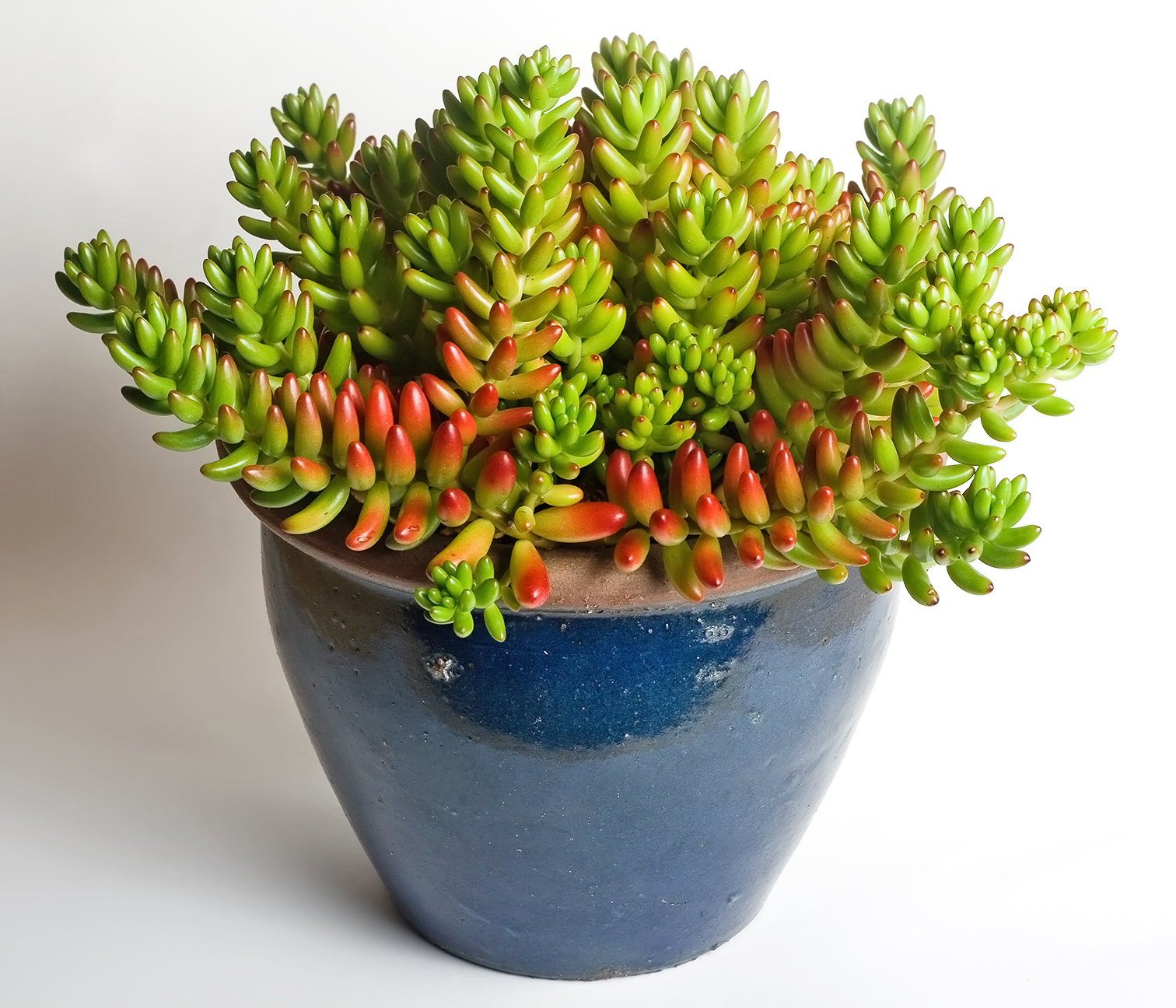

Scientific classification
- Kingdom: Plantae
- Clade: Tracheophytes
- Clade: Angiosperms
- Clade: Eudicots
- Order: Saxifragales
- Family: Crassulaceae
- Subfamily: Sempervivoideae
- Tribe: Sedeae; Fr.

= Sedeae =

Tribe of plants

Sedeae is a tribe of flowering plants within the subfamily Sempervivoideae.

== Taxonomy ==
Sedeae contains the following genera:

- Diamorpha
- × Graptoveria
- × Pachyveria
- Afrovivella
- Lenophyllum
- Chaloupkaea
- Jeronimoa
- Prometheum
- Sedella
- Cremnophila
- Telmissa
- × sedeveria
- Quetzalcoatlia
- Chazaroa
- × Graptosedum
- Echeveria
- Graptoveria
- Rosularia
- Dudleya
- Sedum
- Thompsonella
- Villadia
- Pachyphytum
- Pistorinia
- Graptopetalum
