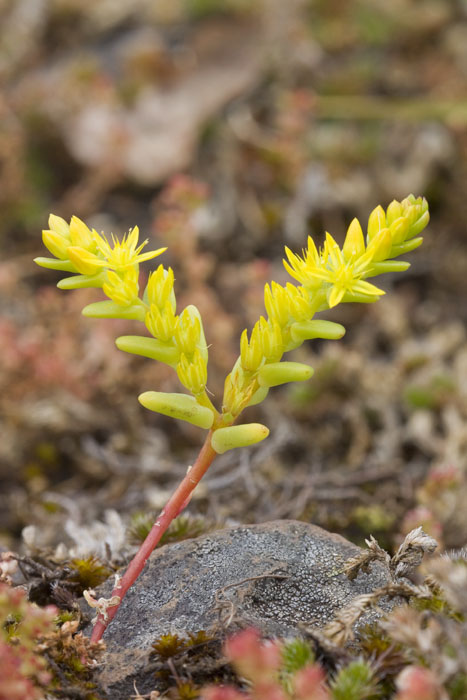
- Sedella pumila

Scientific classification
- Kingdom: Plantae
- Clade: Tracheophytes
- Clade: Angiosperms
- Clade: Eudicots
- Order: Saxifragales
- Family: Crassulaceae
- Subfamily: Sempervivoideae
- Tribe: Sedeae
- Genus: Sedella; Britton & Rose

Type species
- Sedella pumila

Species
- See text

= Sedella (plant) =

Genus of succulents

Sedella (formerly Parvisedum) is a small genus of annual flowering plants in the family Crassulaceae. There are approximately 7 species, all native to California, United States, one with a distribution extending into Oregon. These are petite succulent plants growing a few centimeters tall and bearing tiny yellowish or brownish flowers. Mock stonecrop is a common name for these plants.

== Description ==
These plants are diminutive annuals, they grow erect and are glabrous (without hairs). The leaves are early-deciduous, sessile, and shaped oblong-elliptic to ovoid. The tips of the leaves are rounded to obtuse. The inflorescence has 1 to 2 flowers in 0 to 3 branched cyme, sub-sessile. There are 5 sepals and 5 petals. The petals are pale to bright or green-yellow, with a midrib that is often more or less red.

== Taxonomy ==
The genus was described by Nathaniel Lord Britton and Joseph Nelson Rose during their reorganization of the North American Crassulaceae.

The name is the Latin diminutive of Sedum. The name Parvisedum is a synonym.

=== Species ===
- Sedella atrata Fourr.
- Sedella carinthiaca (Hoppe ex Pacher) Á.Löve & D.Löve
- Sedella congdonii (Eastw.) Britton & Rose - Congdon's mock stonecrop
- Sedella leiocarpa H. Sharsm. - Lake County stonecrop
- Sedella pentandra H. Sharsm. - Mt. Hamilton mock stonecrop
- Sedella pumila (Benth.) Britton & Rose - Sierra mock stonecrop
- Sedella villosa (L.) Fourr.
