= Quetzalcoatlia =

Scientific classification
- Kingdom: Plantae
- Clade: Tracheophytes
- Clade: Angiosperms
- Clade: Eudicots
- Order: Saxifragales
- Family: Crassulaceae
- Subfamily: Sempervivoideae
- Tribe: Sedeae
- Genus: Quetzalcoatlia; A.Vázquez, Rosales & Padilla-Lepe

Genus of flowering plants

Quetzalcoatlia is a genus of flowering plants in the family Crassulaceae. It includes six species native to southwestern Mexico.

== Species ==
Six species are accepted.

- Quetzalcoatlia glassii (Acev.-Rosas & Cházaro) A.Vázquez & Rosales
- Quetzalcoatlia kristenii (Etter, A.Vázquez & Rosales) A.Vázquez & Rosales
- Quetzalcoatlia pentandra (Moran) A.Vázquez & Rosales
- Quetzalcoatlia rosanevadoensis (A.Vázquez & Acev.-Rosas) A.Vázquez & Rosales
- Quetzalcoatlia superba (Kimnach) A.Vázquez & Rosales
- Quetzalcoatlia trujilloi (A.Vázquez & Rosales) A.Vázquez & Rosales
