= Chazaroa =

Scientific classification
- Kingdom: Plantae
- Clade: Tracheophytes
- Clade: Angiosperms
- Clade: Eudicots
- Order: Saxifragales
- Family: Crassulaceae
- Subfamily: Sempervivoideae
- Tribe: Sedeae
- Genus: Chazaroa; A.Vázquez, Padilla-Lepe & Rosales

Genus of flowering plants

Chazaroa is a genus of flowering plants in the family Crassulaceae. It includes three species native to central and southwestern Mexico.

- Chazaroa calycosa (Moran) A.Vázquez & Padilla-Lepe
- Chazaroa valvata (Moran) A.Vázquez & Padilla-Lepe
- Chazaroa yalmanantlanensis (A.Vázquez & Cházaro) A.Vázquez & Padilla-Lepe
