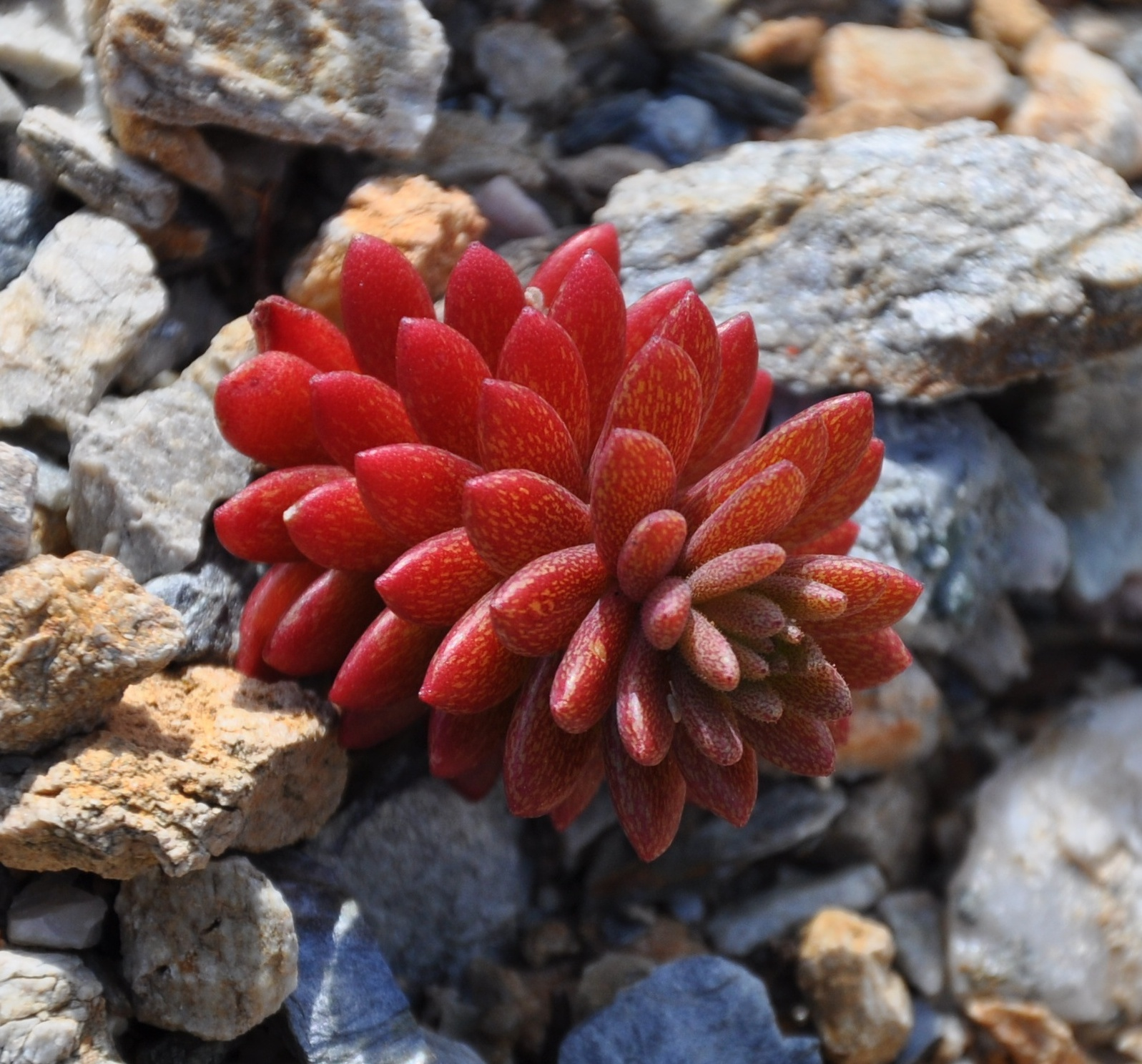
- Pistorinia hispanica

Scientific classification
- Kingdom: Plantae
- Clade: Tracheophytes
- Clade: Angiosperms
- Clade: Eudicots
- Order: Saxifragales
- Family: Crassulaceae
- Subfamily: Sempervivoideae
- Tribe: Sedeae
- Genus: Pistorinia; DC.

Type species
- Pistorinia hispanica (L.) DC.

= Pistorinia =

Genus of flowering plants

Pistorinia is a genus of the succulent plant family Crassulaceae.

== Bibliography ==
- Thiede, Joachim; Eggli, Urs (2007). "Crassulaceae". In Kubitzki, Klaus; Bayer, C.; Stevens, P.F. (eds.). Flowering Plants: Eudicots: Berberidopsidales, Buxales, Crossosomatales, Fabales p.p., Geraniales, Gunnerales, Myrtales p.p., Proteales, Saxifragales, Vitales, Zygophyllales, Clusiaceae Alliance, Passifloraceae Alliance, Dilleniaceae, Huaceae, Picramniaceae, Sabiaceae. The Families and Genera of Vascular Plants. Vol. IX. pp. 83–119. doi:10.1007/978-3-540-32219-1_12. ISBN 978-3-540-32219-1.
