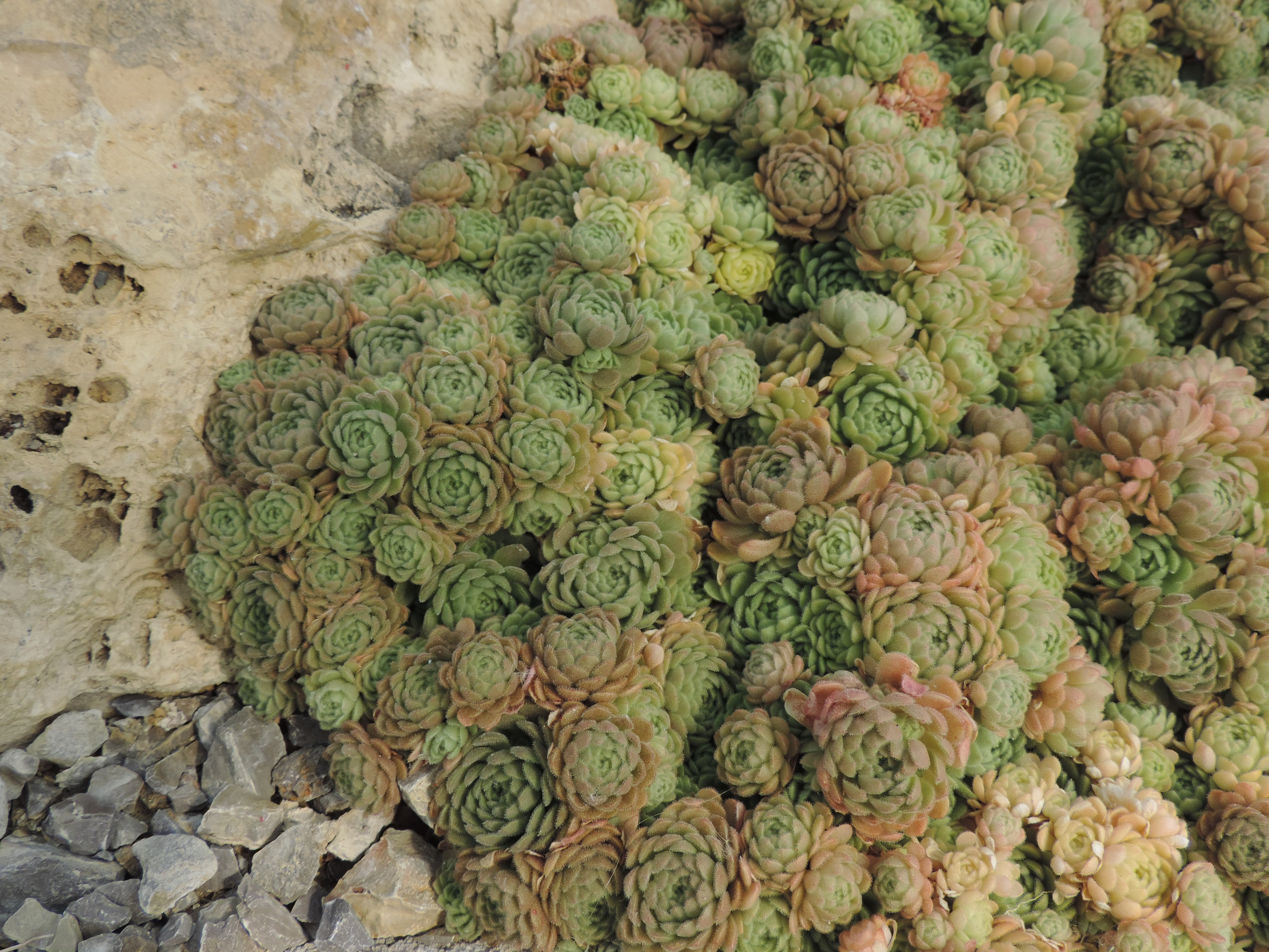

Scientific classification
- Kingdom: Plantae
- Clade: Tracheophytes
- Clade: Angiosperms
- Clade: Eudicots
- Order: Saxifragales
- Family: Crassulaceae
- Genus: Rosularia
- Species: R. aizoon

Binomial name
- Rosularia aizoon (Fenzl) A.Berger, 1930

= Rosularia aizoon =

Species of succulent

Rosularia aizoon is a succulent that forms rosettes of hairy, pale green to blue-green leaves. It is hardy down to zone 7a (-17 °C, 0 °F) and blooms in summer. The plant was first described as Prometheun aizoon by Eduard Fenzl then transferred to genus Rosularia by Alwin Berger in 1930.
