= Sedella congdonii =

Scientific classification
- Kingdom: Plantae
- Clade: Tracheophytes
- Clade: Angiosperms
- Clade: Eudicots
- Order: Saxifragales
- Family: Crassulaceae
- Genus: Sedella
- Species: S. congdonii

Binomial name
- Sedella congdonii (Eastw.) Britton & Rose

Synonyms
- Parvisedum congdonii

Species of succulent

Sedella congdonii is a species of flowering plant in the family Crassulaceae known by the common name Congdon's mock stonecrop. It is endemic to California, where it can be found in the Sierra Nevada, often in rocky and moist habitat types. It is an annual herb growing just a few centimeters high. The oval succulent leaves are just a few millimeters long. The flowers occur in a cyme on thin branches. Each has yellow petals no more than 3 millimeters long.
