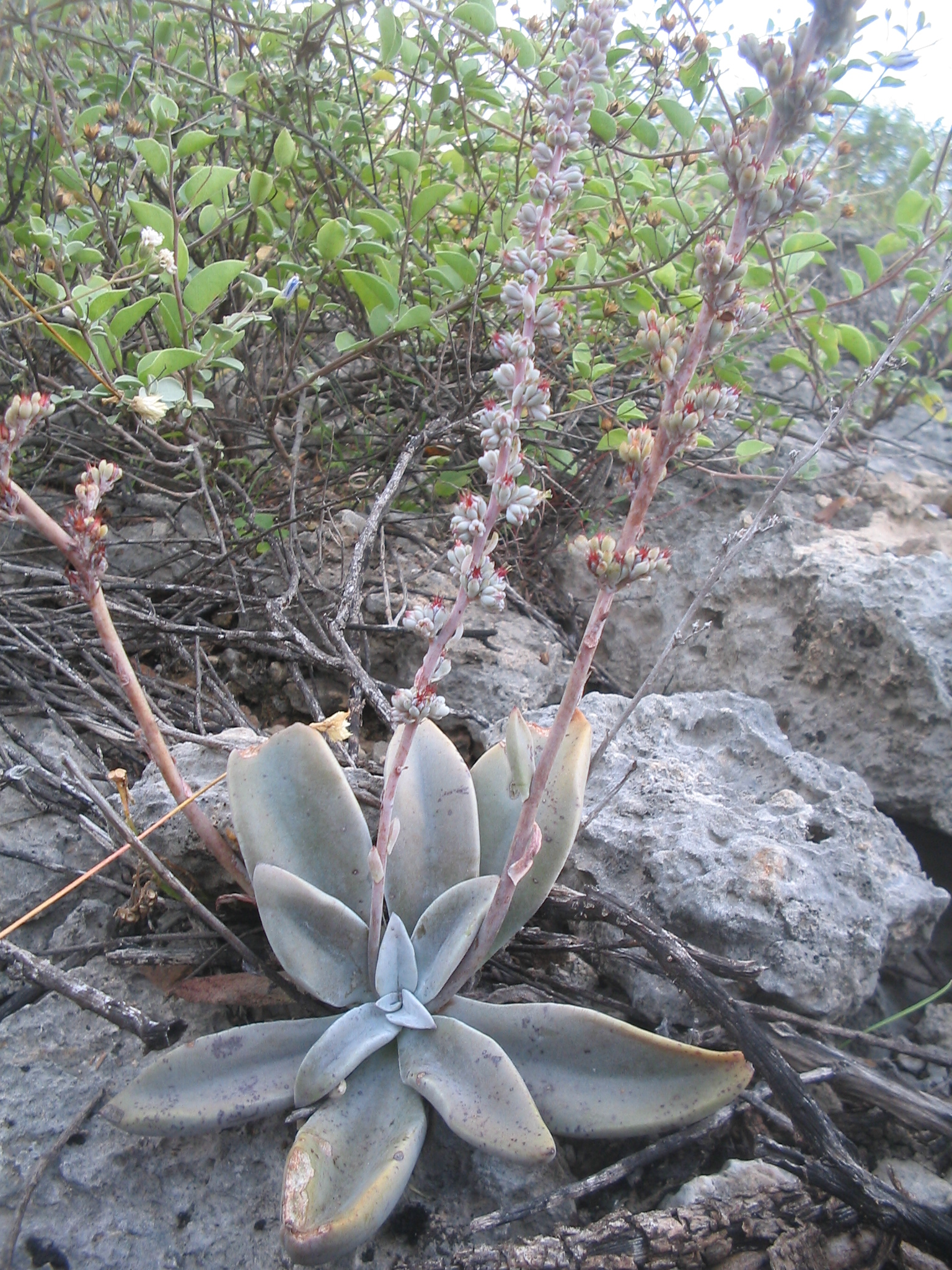
- Thompsonella minutiflora

Scientific classification
- Kingdom: Plantae
- Clade: Tracheophytes
- Clade: Angiosperms
- Clade: Eudicots
- Order: Saxifragales
- Family: Crassulaceae
- Subfamily: Sempervivoideae
- Tribe: Sedeae
- Genus: Thompsonella; Britton & Rose

Species
- Thompsonella colliculosa; Thompsonella garciamendozae; Thompsonella minutiflora; Thompsonella mixtecana; Thompsonella platyphylla; Thompsonella spathulata; Thompsonella xochipalensis

= Thompsonella =

Genus of succulents

Thompsonella is a genus of plants in the family Crassulaceae and is a member of the Acre clade. It includes about eight species endemic to Mexico.
