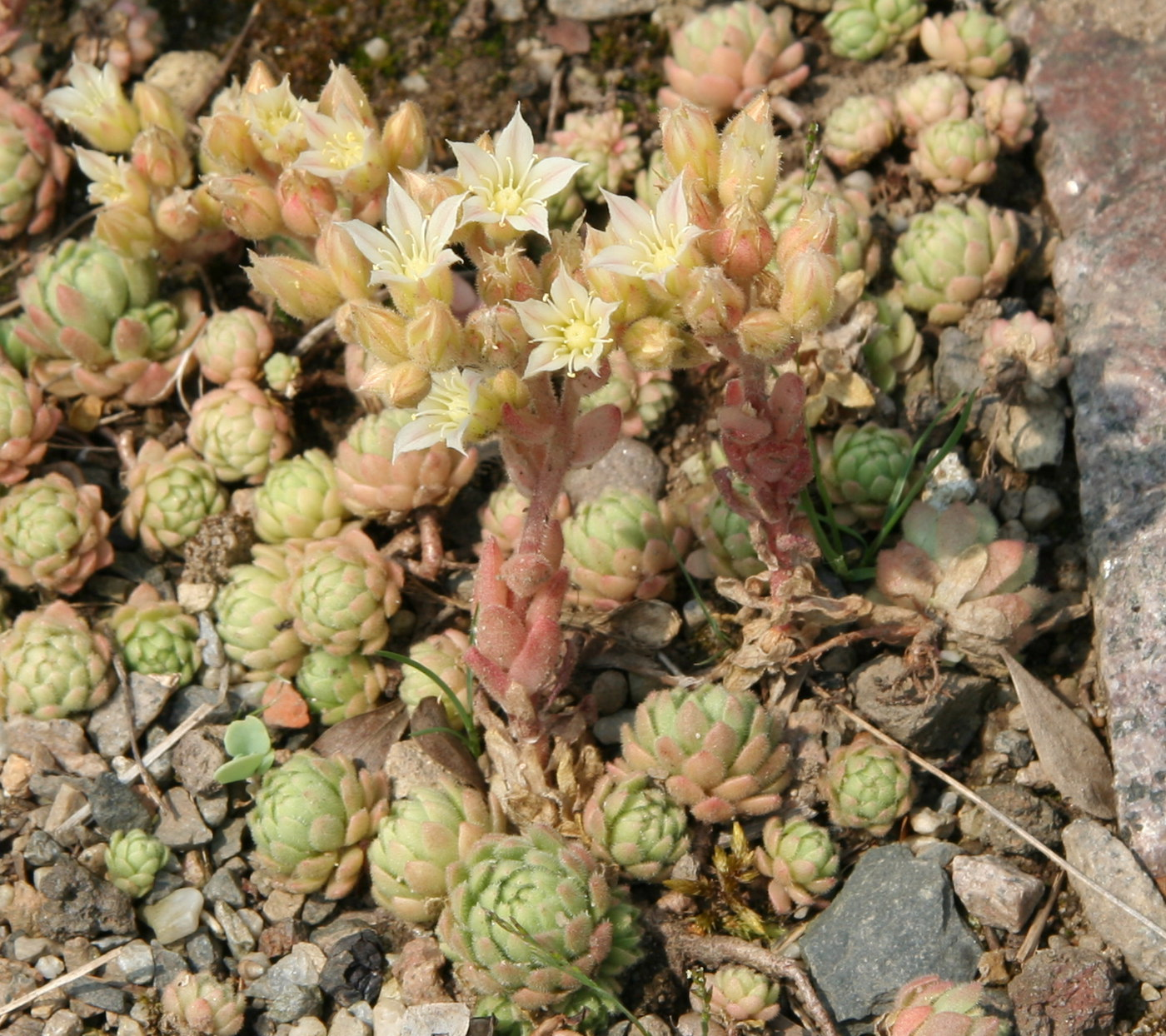

Scientific classification
- Kingdom: Plantae
- Clade: Tracheophytes
- Clade: Angiosperms
- Clade: Eudicots
- Order: Saxifragales
- Family: Crassulaceae
- Subfamily: Sempervivoideae
- Tribe: Sedeae
- Genus: Prometheum (A.Berger) H. Ohba

Type species
- Prometheum sempervivoides (M.Bieb.) H.Ohba

= Prometheum =

Genus of flowering plants belonging to the stonecrop family

Prometheum is a genus of plants in the family Crassulaceae.

== Taxonomy ==
The species in the genus Prometheum include:

- Prometheum pilosum (M.Bieb.) H.Ohba
- Prometheum sempervivoides (Fisch. ex M.Bieb.) H.Ohba
- Prometheum tymphaeum (Quézel & Contandr.) 't Hart

P. sempervivoides and P. pilosum were historically included in genera Sedum (section Cyprosedum), and later Rosularia, but were elevated to a separate genus by Ohba (1995).

== Description ==
According to an experiment done on interspecific plant crosses in the family Crassulaceae, the genus Prometheum produced on average 55 seeds. Furthermore, the same experiment found that plants of the genus Prometheum formed a comparium with each other, meaning they were capable of interbreeding.

== Distribution and habitat ==
From Anatolia to Iran, through the Caucasus.

== Bibliography ==
- Hart, Henk ’t; van Ham, Roeland D.H.J.; Stevens, Jan F.; Elema, Elizabeth T.; van der Klis, Herman; Gadella, Theo W.J. (June 1999). "Biosystematic, molecular and phytochemical evidence for the multiple origin of sympetaly in Eurasian Sedoideae (Crassulaceae)". Biochemical Systematics and Ecology. 27 (4): 407–426. Bibcode:1999BioSE..27..407H. doi:10.1016/S0305-1978(98)00098-2.
- Ohba, H (1978). "Generic and infrageneric classification of the old world sedoideae crassulaceae". Journal of the Faculty of Science University of Tokyo Section III Botany 12(4): 139-193. 12 (4): 139–193.
