= Rosularia cypria =

Scientific classification
- Kingdom: Plantae
- Clade: Tracheophytes
- Clade: Angiosperms
- Clade: Eudicots
- Order: Saxifragales
- Family: Crassulaceae
- Genus: Rosularia
- Species: R. cypria

Binomial name
- Rosularia cypria (Holmboe) Meikle

Species of succulent

Rosularia cypria is a tufted perennial with grey-green, sticky-downy spoon-shaped fleshy leaves, 3–4 cm long, in a loose rosette above an often bare basal trunk; flowering stems to 20 cm, carrying a few more similar leaves; flowers in terminal sprays to 12 cm long with leaf like bracts of diminishing size; calyx densely glandular with 5 deep-cut, broad, lobes forming a 5-angled pyramid; corolla-lobes white, recurved, 8–10 mm long with slender points; fruits comprising 5 papery, many-seeded follicles, circa 4 mm. Flowers from April to July. Common name Kıbrıs Göbekotu.

== Habitat ==
Frequent on limestone cliffs and walls, usually north-facing, at middle-to-high altitudes.

== Distribution ==
Along the Kyrenia Range from Lapta to Yayla. Endemic to Northern Cyprus.
