= Sedella leiocarpa =

Conservation status
- Endangered (ESA)

Scientific classification
- Kingdom: Plantae
- Clade: Tracheophytes
- Clade: Angiosperms
- Clade: Eudicots
- Order: Saxifragales
- Family: Crassulaceae
- Genus: Sedella
- Species: S. leiocarpa

Binomial name
- Sedella leiocarpa H.K.Sharsm.

Synonyms
- Parvisedum leiocarpum

Species of succulent

Sedella leiocarpa is a rare species of flowering plant in the family Crassulaceae known by the common names Lake County mock stonecrop and Lake County stonecrop. It is endemic to Lake County, California, where it is known from only about ten occurrences in two locations. It is a resident of drying vernal pools and rocky clay flats, where it grows in colonies. It is a federally listed endangered species. This is an annual herb growing no more than four centimeters high. It is a tiny erect reddish or yellow succulent plant with sparse leaves each a few millimeters long. The flowers have yellow to reddish petals 3 or 4 millimeters long.

== Taxonomy ==
The scientific publication describing Sedella leiocarpa was published in 1940 by Helen Sharsmith. The species is listed as valid World Plants, however it is listed in World Flora Online as unchecked and by Plants of the World Online as a name that cannot be accepted or placed as a synonym of any other species name. If accepted as a valid species it is classified in the Sedella genus in the Crassulaceae family. The species name is also used in the Flora of North America
