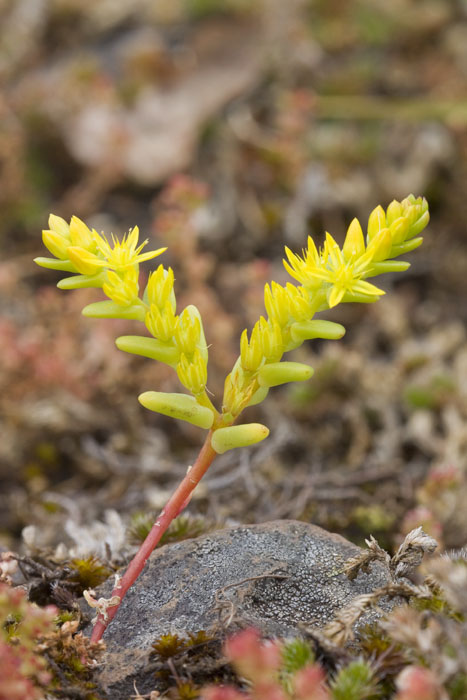

Scientific classification
- Kingdom: Plantae
- Clade: Tracheophytes
- Clade: Angiosperms
- Clade: Eudicots
- Order: Saxifragales
- Family: Crassulaceae
- Genus: Sedella
- Species: S. pumila

Binomial name
- Sedella pumila (Benth.) Britton & Rose

Synonyms
- Parvisedum pumilum

= Sedella pumila =

Species of succulent

Sedella pumila is a species of flowering plant in the family Crassulaceae known by the common name Sierra mock stonecrop. It is native to California, where it grows in the North Coast Ranges and adjacent sections of the Central Valley to the Sierra Nevada foothills. It is a plant of vernal pools and similar habitat, growing in rocky and gravelly flats of serpentine soils, limestone, and soils of volcanic origin, often alongside mosses. This is an annual herb growing 2 to 17 centimeters high, in shades of green, yellow, and red. It has small knobby succulent leaves each a few millimeters long. The flowers atop the threadlike stems have fleshy sepals and yellowish petals a few millimeters in length. The flowers have a musty scent.
