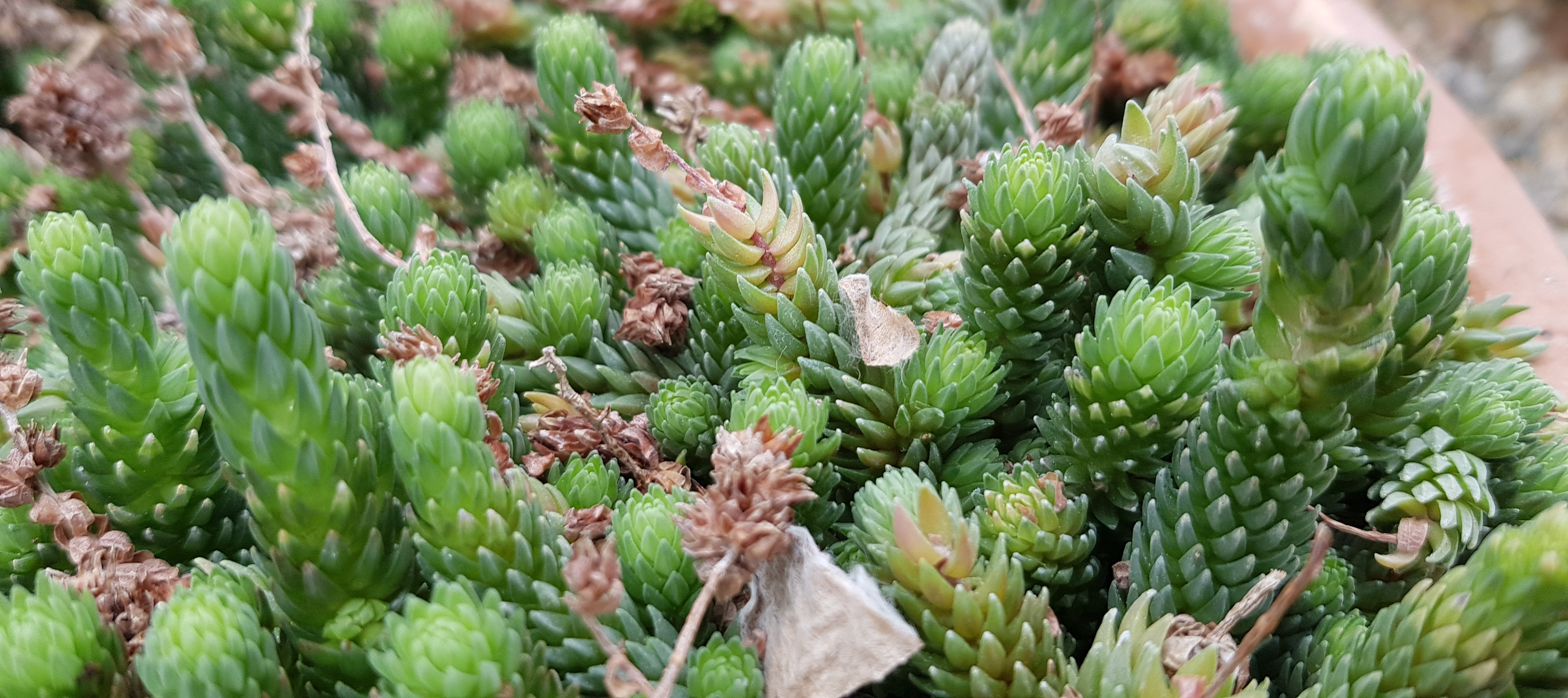
- Villadia imbricata

Scientific classification
- Kingdom: Plantae
- Clade: Tracheophytes
- Clade: Angiosperms
- Clade: Eudicots
- Order: Saxifragales
- Family: Crassulaceae
- Subfamily: Sempervivoideae
- Tribe: Sedeae
- Genus: Villadia; Rose

Species
- See text

Synonyms
- Altamiranoa Rose

= Villadia =

Genus of succulents

Villadia is a genus of plants in the family Crassulaceae. It includes about 25 to 30 species distributed from Texas to Peru.

== Taxonomy ==
Altamiranoa was a genus of the Crassulaceae, that Joseph Nelson Rose proposed in the early 1900s for 12 Mexican species, three described as new and nine formerly in Cotyledon, Sedum, or Umbilicus. The name was dedicated to Fernando Altamirano, a Mexican physician, botanist and naturalist that co-worked with J. N. Rose.

Baehni (1937) united the genus Altamiranoa with Villadia, but Walther (1938) refuted the argument and proposed the combined genus be called species of Altamiranoa are best dispersed in Sedum genus, but maintained the differences with genus Villadia.

Species listed under Altamiranoa include:

- Altamiranoa albiflora (Villadia albiflora)
- Altamiranoa alpina
- Altamiranoa batesii (Villadia batesii)
- Altamiranoa berillonana
- Altamiranoa calcicola
- Altamiranoa chihuahuensis (Sedum chihuahuensis)
- Altamiranoa cucullata (Villadia cucullata)
- Altamiranoa decipiens
- Altamiranoa diffusa
- Altamiranoa dyvrandae
- Altamiranoa elongata (Sedum jurgensenii)
- Altamiranoa erecta
- Altamiranoa ericoides
- Altamiranoa fusca
- Altamiranoa galeottiana
- Altamiranoa goldmanii (Sedum goldmanii)
- Altamiranoa grandyi (Sedum grandyi)
- Altamiranoa guatemalensis (Villadia guatemalensis)
- Altamiranoa hemsleyana
- Altamiranoa imbricata (Villadia imbricata)
- Altamiranoa incarum (Villadia incarum)
- Altamiranoa jurgensenii (Sedum jurgensenii)
- Altamiranoa levis
- Altamiranoa mexicana
- Altamiranoa minutiflora (Villadia minutiflora)
- Altamiranoa montana
- Altamiranoa necaxana
- Altamiranoa nelsonii (Villadia nelsonii)
- Altamiranoa batesii
- Altamiranoa painteri (Villadia painteri)
- Altamiranoa parva
- Altamiranoa parviflora
- Altamiranoa pringlei (Villadia pringlei)
- Altamiranoa ramosissima
- Altamiranoa ramulos
- Altamiranoa ramulosa
- Altamiranoa scopulina (Sedum scopulinum)
- Altamiranoa squamulosa (Villadia squamulosa)
- Altamiranoa stricta
- Altamiranoa virgata
- Altamiranoa weberbaueri

Media related to Villadia at Wikimedia Commons
