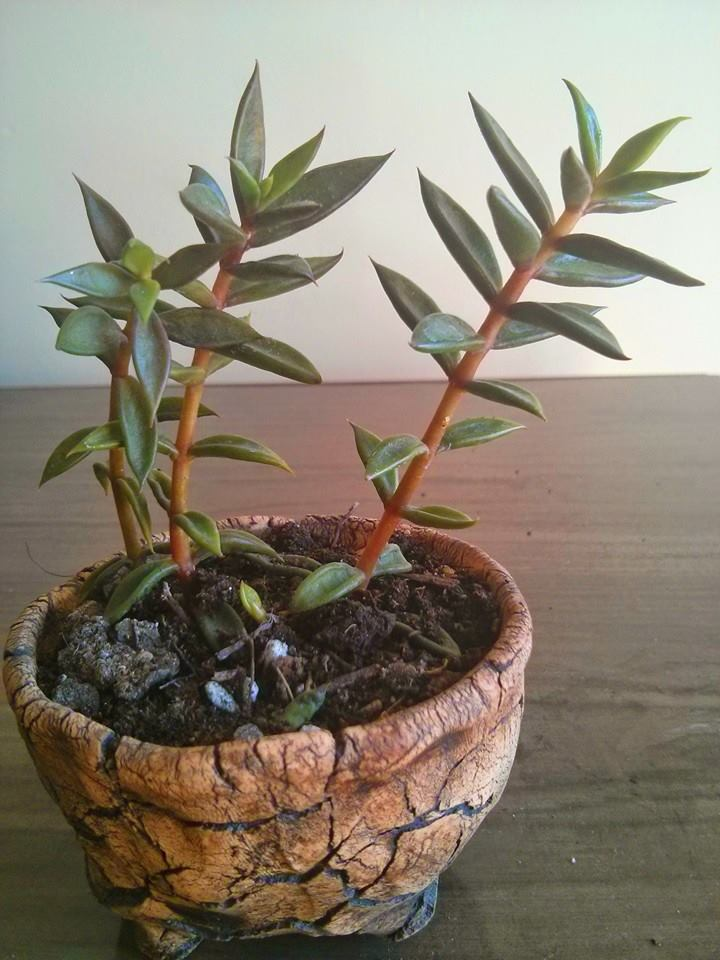
- Lenophyllum texanum

Scientific classification
- Kingdom: Plantae
- Clade: Tracheophytes
- Clade: Angiosperms
- Clade: Eudicots
- Order: Saxifragales
- Family: Crassulaceae
- Subfamily: Sempervivoideae
- Tribe: Sedeae
- Genus: Lenophyllum; Rose

Species
- See text

= Lenophyllum =

Genus of succulents

Lenophyllum is a genus of flowering plants in the family Crassulaceae. The roughly seven species it contains are distributed in Texas in the United States and northeastern Mexico. Some authorities place it in the genus Sedum. Plants in this genus are distinguished from Sedum species by the presence of terminal inflorescences, erect petals, and opposite leaves. The name is derived from the Ancient Greek words ληνός (lenos), meaning "trough", and φύλλον (phyllon), meaning "leaf."

== Selected species ==
- Lenophyllum acutifolium Rose
- Lenophyllum guttatum Rose
- Lenophyllum texanum (J.G.Sm.) Rose – Coastal stonecrop
- Lenophyllum weinbergii Britton
