= Sedella pentandra =

Scientific classification
- Kingdom: Plantae
- Clade: Tracheophytes
- Clade: Angiosperms
- Clade: Eudicots
- Order: Saxifragales
- Family: Crassulaceae
- Genus: Sedella
- Species: S. pentandra

Binomial name
- Sedella pentandra H.K.Sharsm.

Synonyms
- Parvisedum pentandrum

Species of succulent

Sedella pentandra is a species of flowering plant in the family Crassulaceae known by the common name Mt. Hamilton mock stonecrop. It is endemic to California, where it grows in the Central Coast Ranges and adjacent sections of the Central Valley and coastline. It often grows on sandstone and serpentine soils. This is an annual herb growing no more than 8 centimeters high. It has small succulent leaves each a few millimeters long. The flowers atop the threadlike stems have fleshy sepals and yellowish petals a few millimeters in length.
