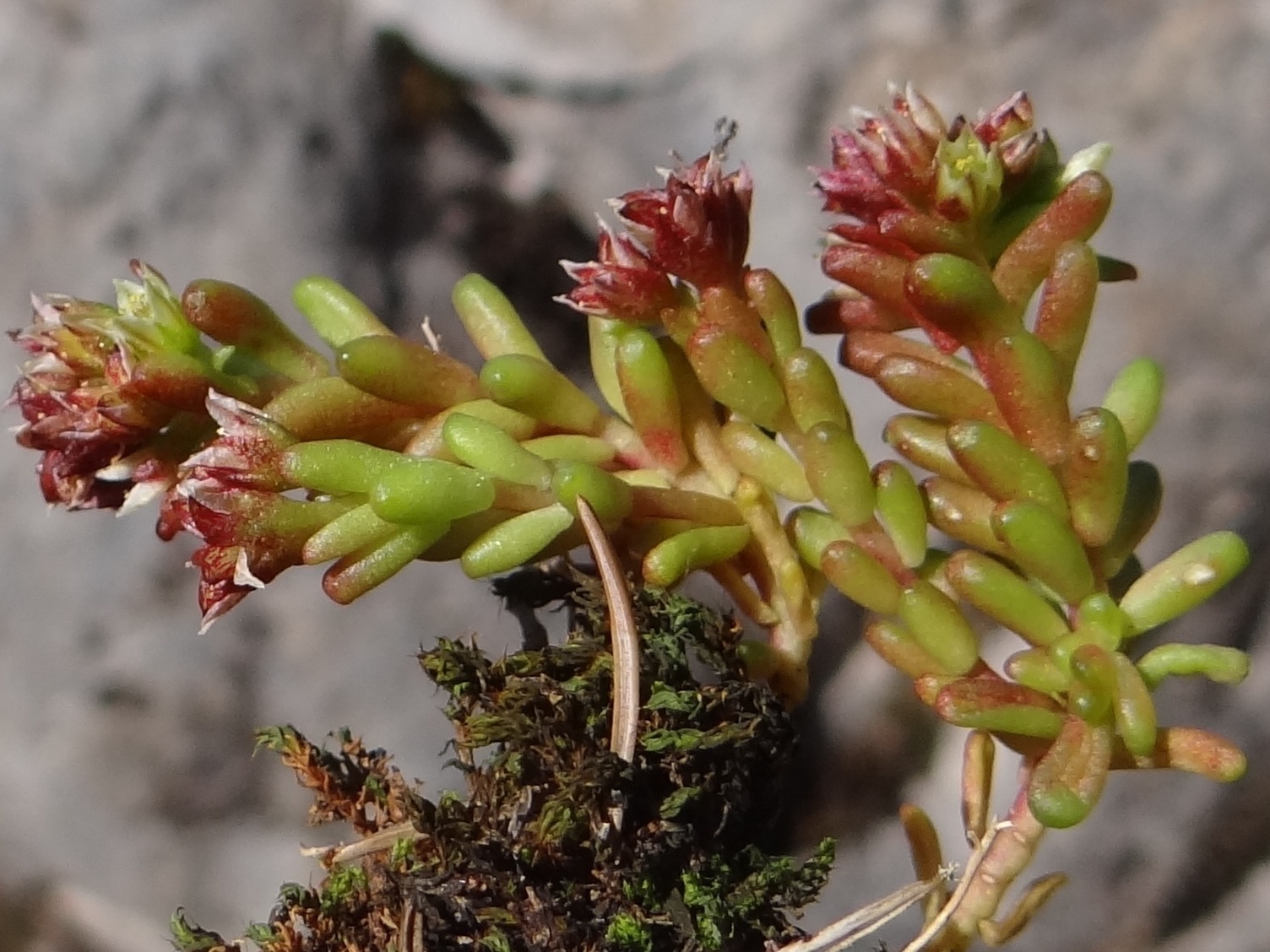
- Close-up of leaves and flowers
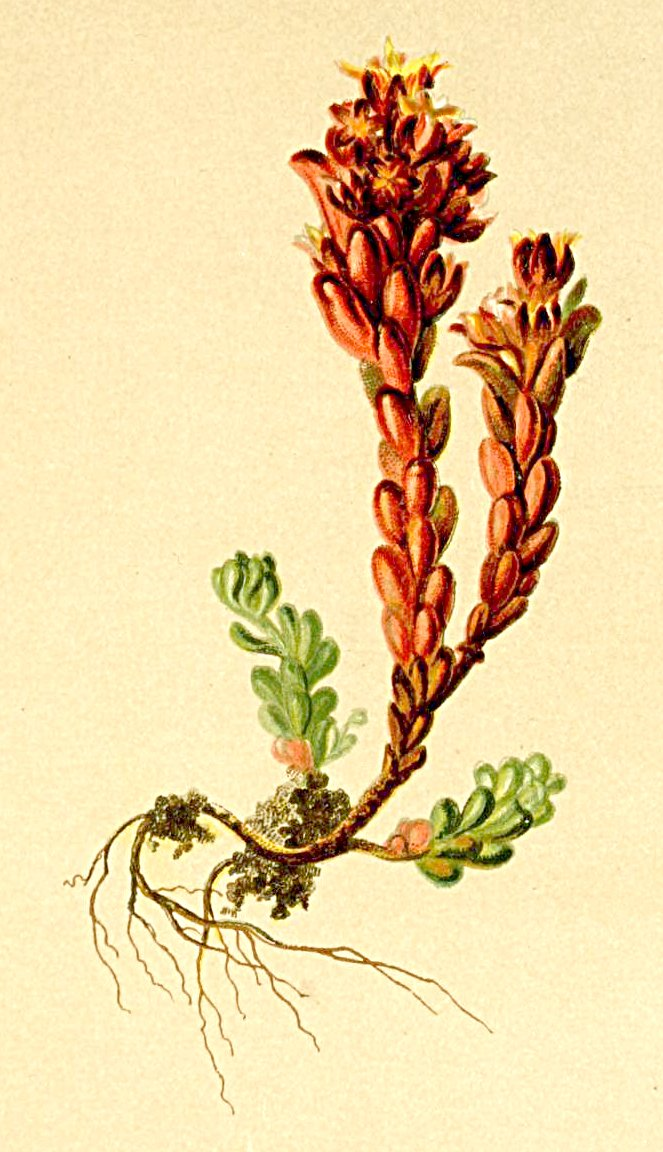
- Botanical illustration

Scientific classification
- Kingdom: Plantae
- Clade: Tracheophytes
- Clade: Angiosperms
- Clade: Eudicots
- Order: Saxifragales
- Family: Crassulaceae
- Genus: Sedum
- Species: S. atratum

Binomial name
- Sedum atratum L.

Synonyms
- List: Sedella atrata (L.) Fourr.; Sedella carinthiaca (Hoppe ex Pacher) Á.Löve & D.Löve; Sedum atratum subsp. carinthiacum (Hoppe ex Pacher) D.A.Webb; Sedum atratum var. carinthiacum Hoppe ex Pacher; Sedum atratum var. guetardii Roth; Sedum carinthiacum (Hoppe ex Pacher) Fritsch; Sedum erubescens Sennen; Sedum haematodes Scop.; Sedum rivasgodayi A.Segura

= Sedum atratum =

Species of plant

Sedum atratum, the dark stonecrop, is a species of flowering plant in the family Crassulaceae, native to the mountain ranges of Europe; Cantabrians, Pyrenees, Alps, Apennines, Carpathians, and Balkans. Usually an annual, it is a succulent found at elevations up to 2,300 m (7,500 ft).

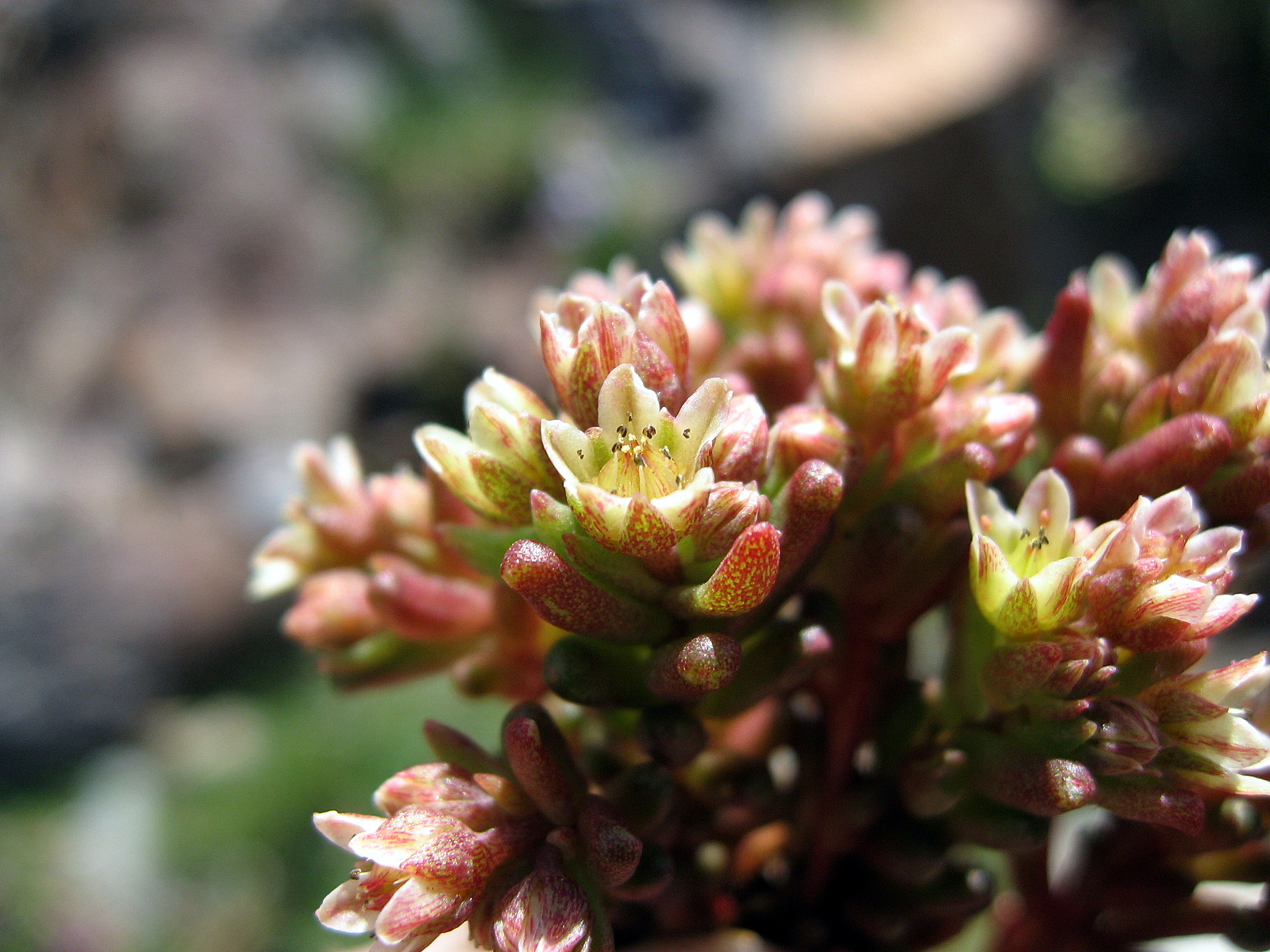
An individual with somewhat subdued coloration

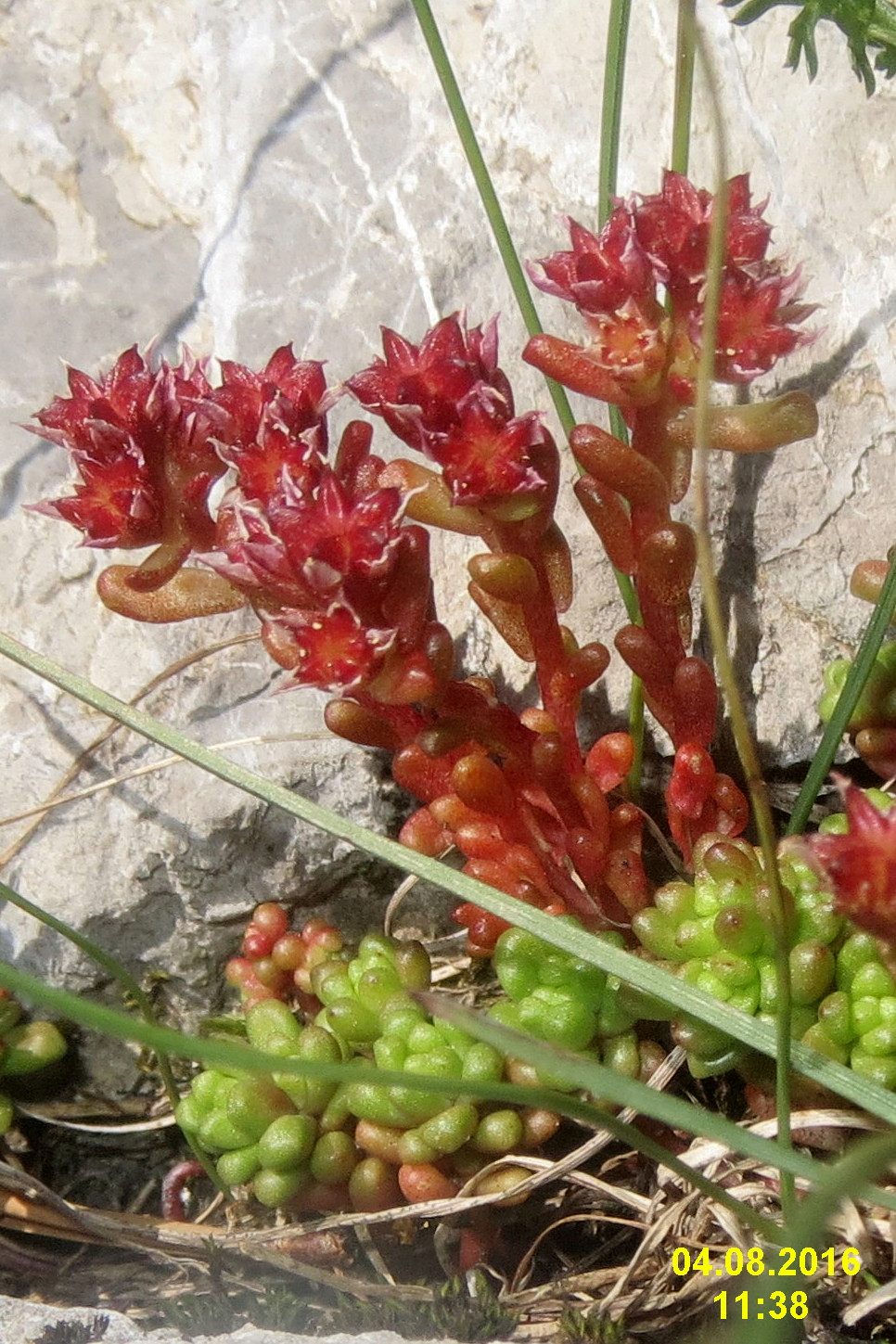
Leaves on the flowering stems turn red

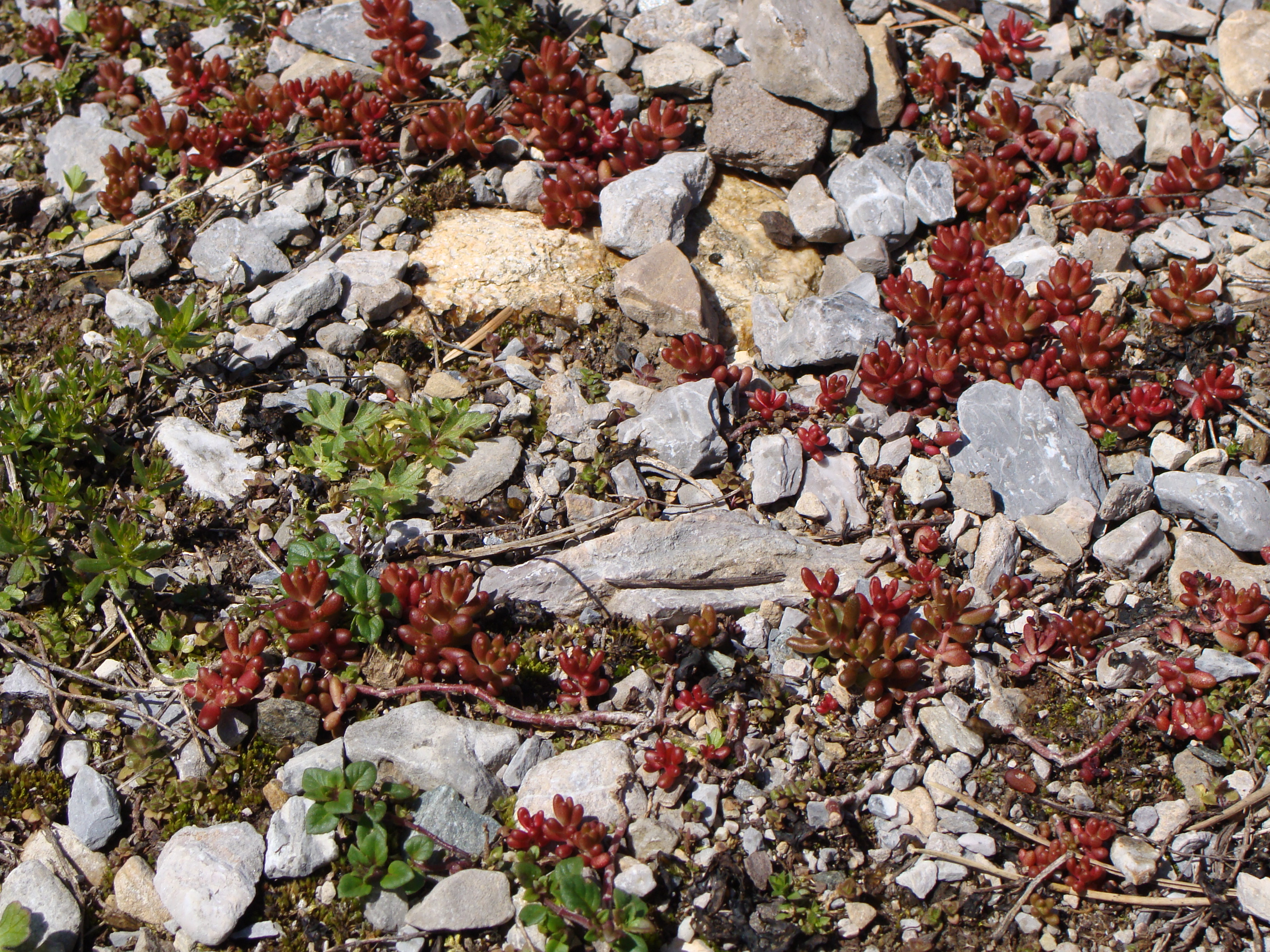
In the Cirque de Gavarnie

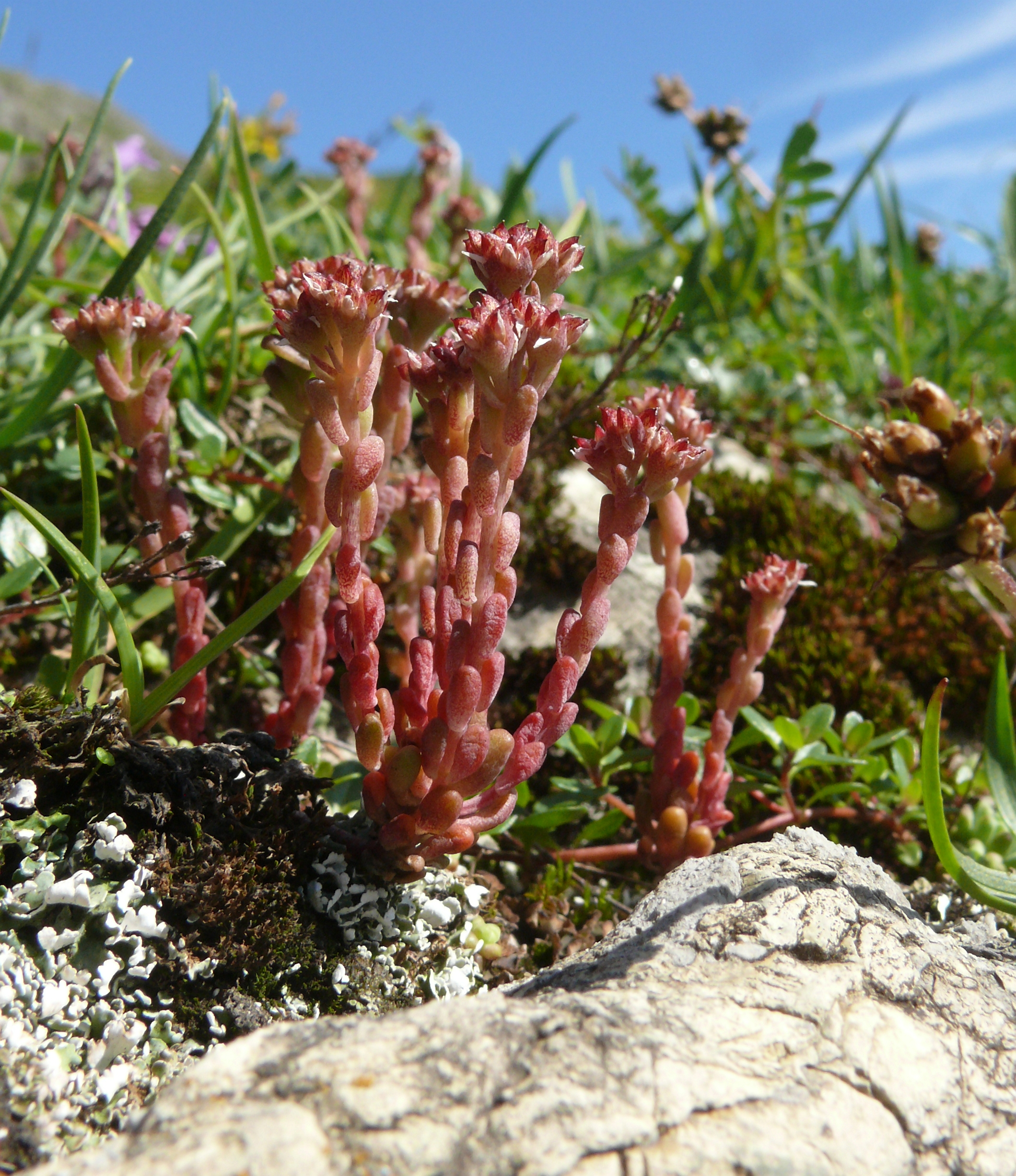
In the Allgäu Alps
