= Afrovivella =

Scientific classification
- Kingdom: Plantae
- Clade: Tracheophytes
- Clade: Angiosperms
- Clade: Eudicots
- Order: Saxifragales
- Family: Crassulaceae
- Subfamily: Sempervivoideae
- Tribe: Sedeae
- Genus: Afrovivella; A.Berger
- Species: A. semiensis

Binomial name
- Afrovivella semiensis (J.Gay ex A.Rich.) A.Berger

Synonyms
- Rosularia semiensis (J.Gay ex A.Rich.) H.Ohba; Umbilicus semiensis J.Gay ex A.Rich.; Sempervivum simense Hochst. ex Britten

Genus of flowering plants

Afrovivella is a monotypic genus of the succulent plant family Crassulaceae. The sole species is Afrovivella semiensis.

It has bright green leaves that are rimmed with conspicuous hairs. It was introduced once to the United States by Myron Kimnach in cultivation, until the plants were consumed by snails.

The species is found in the Semien Mountains of Ethiopia.

== Bibliography ==
Thiede, Joachim; Eggli, Urs (2007). "Crassulaceae". In Kubitzki, Klaus; Bayer, C.; Stevens, P.F. (eds.). Flowering Plants: Eudicots: Berberidopsidales, Buxales, Crossosomatales, Fabales p.p., Geraniales, Gunnerales, Myrtales p.p., Proteales, Saxifragales, Vitales, Zygophyllales, Clusiaceae Alliance, Passifloraceae Alliance, Dilleniaceae, Huaceae, Picramniaceae, Sabiaceae. The Families and Genera of Vascular Plants. Vol. IX. pp. 83–119. doi:10.1007/978-3-540-32219-1_12. ISBN 978-3-540-32219-1.
