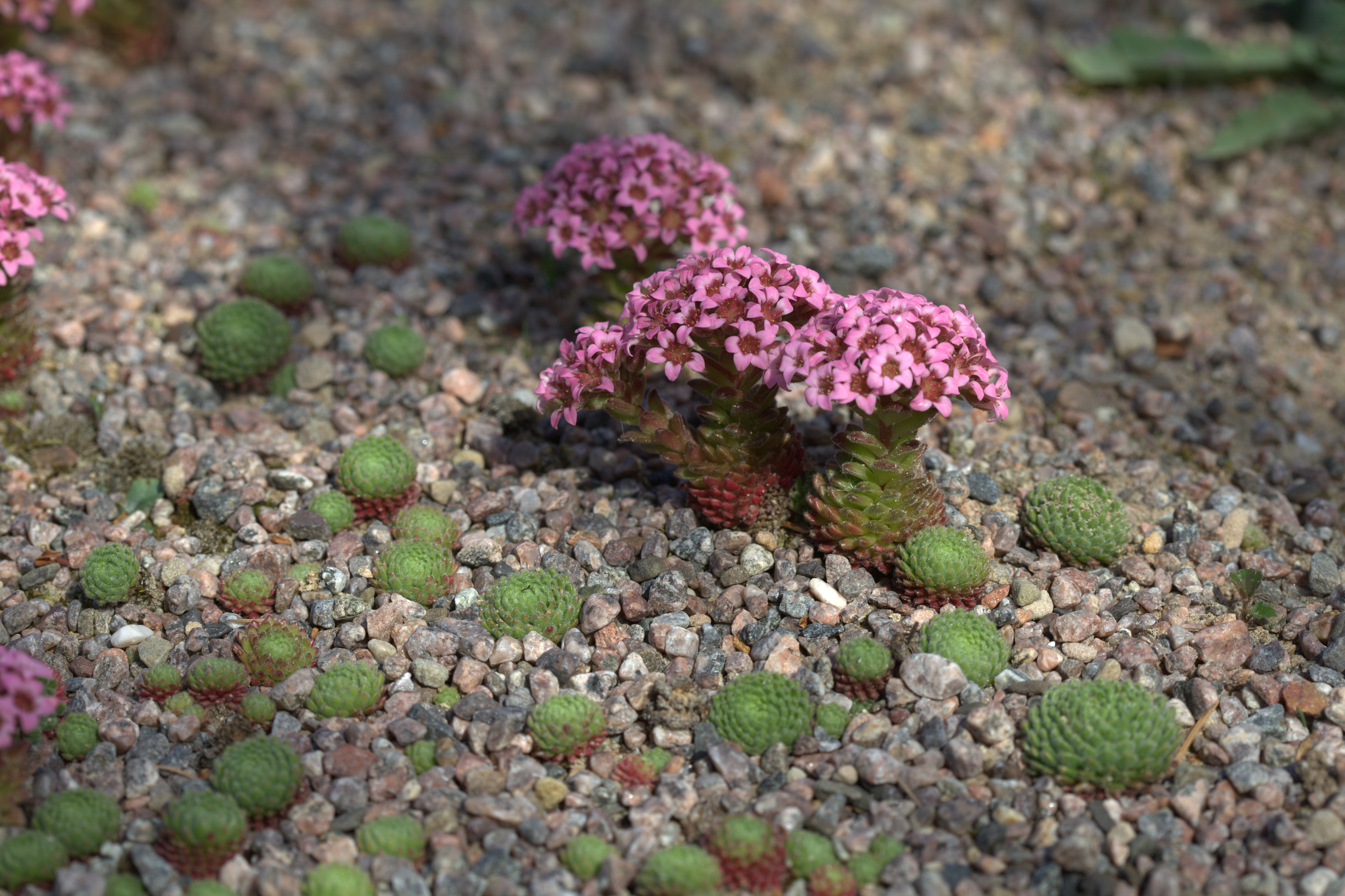

Scientific classification
- Kingdom: Plantae
- Clade: Tracheophytes
- Clade: Angiosperms
- Clade: Eudicots
- Order: Saxifragales
- Family: Crassulaceae
- Genus: Prometheum
- Species: P. pilosum

Binomial name
- Prometheum pilosum (M.Bieb.) H.Ohba

Synonyms
- Cotyledon pubescens C.A.Mey.; Pseudorosularia pilosa (M.Bieb.) Gurgen.; Rosularia pilosa (M.Bieb.) Boriss.; Sedum pilosum M.Bieb.; Umbilicus pubescens G.Don

= Prometheum pilosum =

Species of succulent

Prometheum pilosum is a succulent plant in the family Crassulaceae. It is native to Western Asia.
