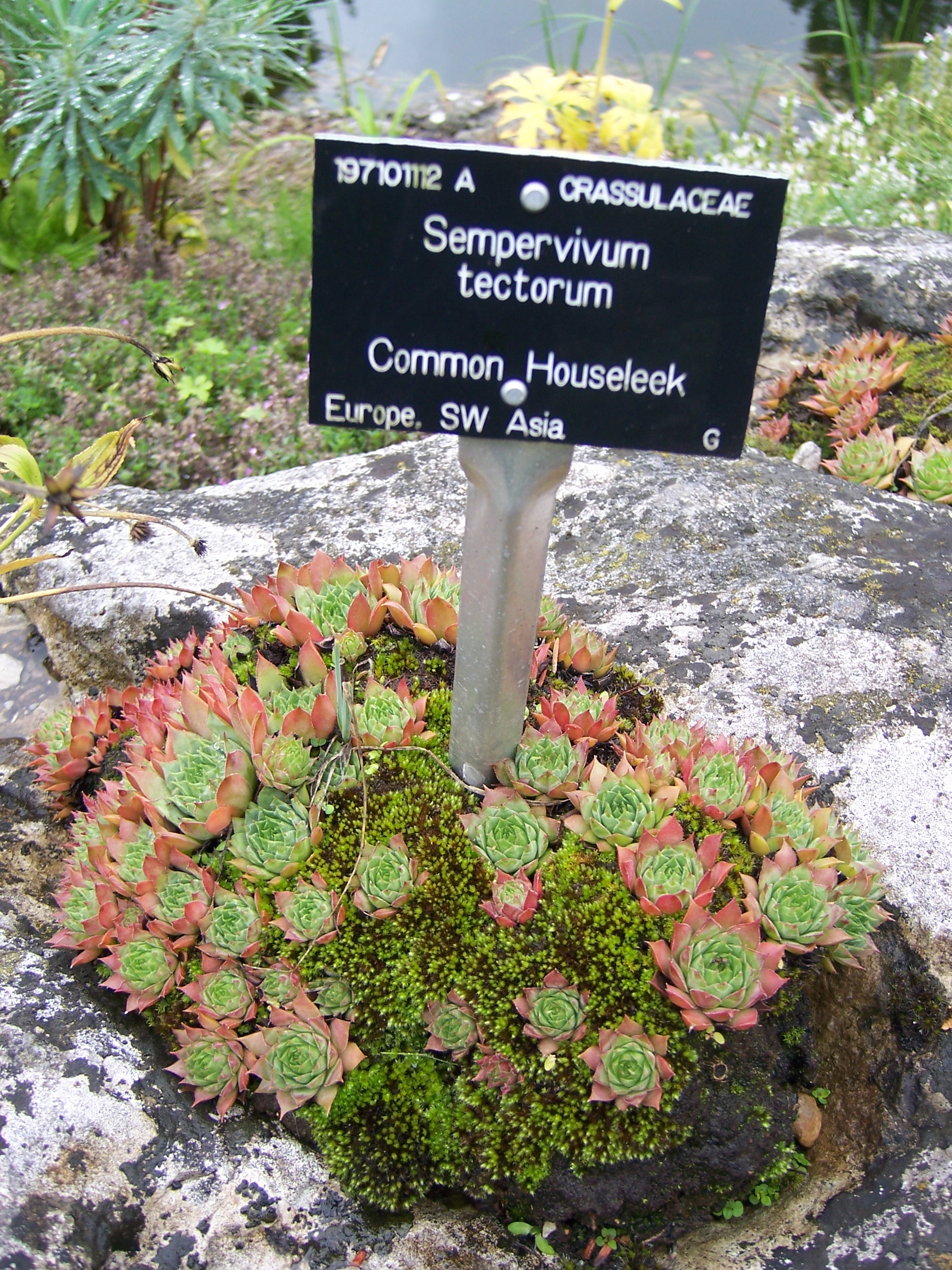
- Sempervivum tectorum

Scientific classification
- Kingdom: Plantae
- Clade: Embryophytes
- Clade: Tracheophytes
- Clade: Angiosperms
- Clade: Eudicots
- Order: Saxifragales
- Family: Crassulaceae
- Subfamily: Sempervivoideae; Arn

Type genus
- Sempervivum

Tribes
- Telephieae 't Hart Ohba and Thieded ined.; Umbiliceae Meisn.; Semperviveae Dumort.; Aeonieae Thiede ined. (Note: Reveal proposed the revised authority: Aeonieae Thiede ex Reveal); Sedeae Fr.

Synonyms
- Sedeae; Sedoideae Berger

= Sempervivoideae =

Subfamily in the flowering plant family Crassulaceae

Sempervivoideae is the largest of three subfamilies in the Saxifragales family Crassulaceae, with about 20–30 genera with succulent leaves. Unlike the two smaller subfamilies, it is distributed in temperate climates. The largest genus in this subfamily is Sedum, with about 470 species.

== Description ==
Succulent leaved plants. Unlike the other two smaller subfamilies, which are highly derived, Sempervivoideae retain the basic features of the family Crassulaceae. The Sempervivoideae contain many familiar horticultural plants, such as Sedum.

== Taxonomy ==
Sempervivoideae has taxonomic priority over its synonym, Sedoideae, and is related to the other Crassulaceae subfamilies, as shown in this cladogram, although Messerschmid and colleagues (2020) state that these three subfamily clades are successive sisters, rather than Sempervivoideae being a direct sister only to Kalanchoideae.

Cladogram I: Evolutionary lines in Crassulaceae

- Crassulaceae
  - Crassuloideae
  - - Kalanchoideae
    - Sempervivoideae

=== Subdivisions ===
Six clades within the Subfamily Sempervivoideae have been segregated into five tribes with about thirty genera.

Clades and tribes within Sempervivoideae
Clade	Tribe
Acre	Sedeae
Leucosedum	Sedeae
Aeonium	Aeonieae
Sempervivum	Semperviveae
Rhodiola	Umbiliceae
Hylotelephium	Telephieae

The composition of the five tribes are: (number of genera/species);

- Telephieae (6/50)
- Umbiliceae (4/100)
- Semperviveae (2/75)
- Aeonieae (3/70)
- Sedeae (7/520)

and their relationship is shown in the cladogram:

Cladogram II: Sempervivoideae tribes

- Sempervivoideae
  - Telephieae
  - - Umbilicieae
    - - Aeonieae
      - - Semperviveae
        - Sedeae

However, given the difficulty of establishing a stable classification, some authors prefer larger groupings, e.g.;

- Telephinae (Telephieae, Umbilicieae)
- Sedinae (Semperviveae, Aeonieae, Sedeae)

Alternatively, Messerschmid and colleagues (2020), based on the largest analysis of subfamily taxa, propose the following clade structure (with tribes) and number of genera, species;

- Telephium (Telephieae, Umbiliceae) 9, 160
- Sempervivum (Semperviveae) 3, 60
- Aeonium (Aeonieae) 4, 67 (+ Sedum p.p. 8 sp.)
- Leucosedum (Sedeae p.p.) 6,80 (+ Sedum p.p. 120 sp.)
- Acre (Sedeae p.p.) 7, 205 (+ Sedum p.p. 345 sp.)

In this analysis, these clades and tribes were related as shown in this cladogram;

Cladogram III: Crassulaceae and Sempervivoideae clades and divisions

- Family Crassulaceae 100
  - 82
    Subfamily Crassuloideae
  - - 71
      Subfamily Kalanchoideae
    - Subfamily Sempervivoideae
      - Telephium clade 66
        - Tribe Telephiae
        - Umbiliceae Tribe
          - Clade
            Umbilicus
          - Clade
            Phedimus/Rhodiola
      - - Clade
          Sempervivum/Jovibarba (Tribe Semperviveae)
        - Clade
          Aeonium (Tribe Aeoniae)
        - Sedeae Tribe
          - Clade
            Acre
          - Clade
            Leucosedum

Notes:
I: Petrosedum clade is unplaced, due to discordance in analyses. In plastid phylogeny, it is one of the successive sister clades to the remainder of Sempervivoideae, without Telephium. But in Internal transcribed spacer (ITS) phylogeny Petrosedum it is sister to Aeonium, with Sempervivum/Jovibarba closest to Sedeae. Previously it had been placed within Sempervivum/Jovibarba.
II: Divergence times are in million years ago

Semperviviae, Aeonieae and Sedeae are definable only by plesiomorphic features, with their genera all derived from within Sedum. Segregates of Sedum occur in each of these, but lack sufficient features to allow them to be allocated to definitive genera.

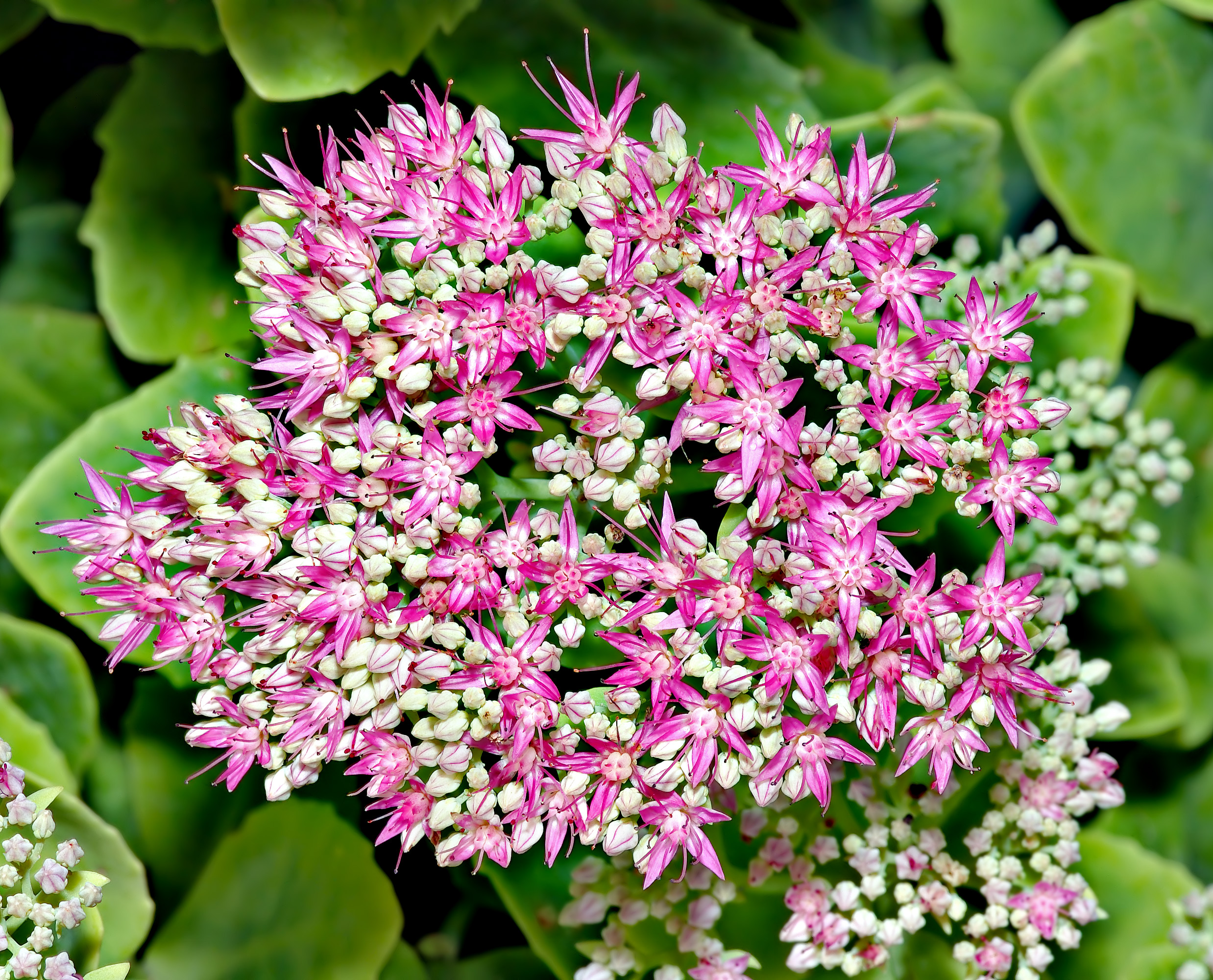
Hylotelephium spectabile

=== Telephium clade ===
This monophyletic clade is sister to the remainder of the Sempervivoideae subfamily, and its three sublineages, Telephiae, Phedimus/Rhodiola and Umbilicus form a polytomy with the rest of the subfamily.

==== Telephieae tribe ('t Hart) Ohba and Thiede ined. ====
The Telephieae (Note: The name Telephieae may be illegitimate in this context, since it has been previously used as a synonym for Caryophyllaceae) genera consist of former infrageneric taxa of Sedum, and are distributed primarily in East Asia, but with a few species found in Europe and N America (Hylotelphium). Defined by 5-merous flowers, free petals, flat, dentate leaves and tuberous roots or thickened rhizomes. Leaves usually in rosettes, except Hylotelephium, petals often spotted, autumn flowering. The taxonomy remains unstable, with species Orostachys embedded within both Meterostachys and Hylotelephium. Neither Hylotelphium nor Orostachys are considered monophyletic. But of the two sections of the genus, section Appendiculatae appears monophyletic and sister to Meterostachys. Kungia is a segregate of a non-monophyletic Orostachys and appears to be a sister to Sinocrassula.

It is likely that diversification of the tribe occurred at the time of the formation of the Himalayas. Telephiae contains about 6 genera, with about 48–50 species, including:

- Hylotelephium H.Ohba c. 27–30 sp., N hemisphere
- Kungia K.T.Fu 2 sp., SW China
- Meterostachys Nakai c. 1 sp., E Asia
- Orostachys Fisch. c. 5–15 sp, C-E Asia
- Sinocrassula A.Berger c. 3–7 sp., Himalaya
- Perrierosedum (A.Berger) H.Ohba incertae sedis c. 1 sp., Madagascar

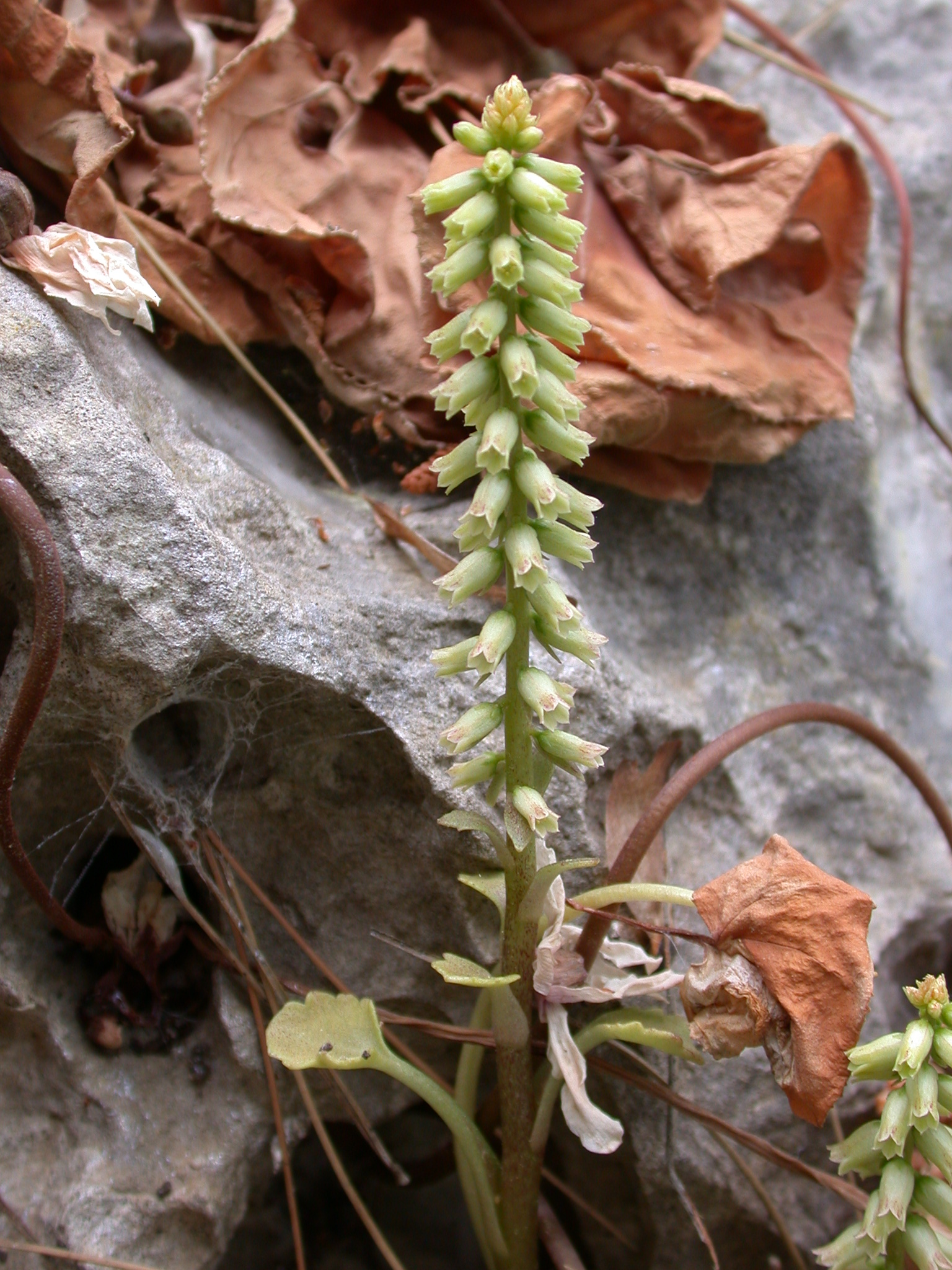
Umbilicus intermedius

==== Umbiliceae tribe Meisn. ====
The Umbeliceae occur mainly in temperate areas of Asia, flowering in spring to early summer, with about 4−5 genera and 100 species. The tribe consists of two subclades. The first, Phedimus/Rhodiola, includes Phedimus, Rhodiola and Pseudosedum. The latter has been included within Rhodiola, or treated as sister to that genus. Aizopsis is included by some authors in Phedimus. This subclade contains about 88 species found predominantly in Asia, but some species of Phedimus and Rhodiola in Europe and some Rhodiola in N America.

The second is the genus Umbilicus with about 13 species, distributed in the Mediterranean, Macaronesia, SW Asia, Arabia and north to east Africa.

These genera are among those that have been segregated from Sedum, including:

- Aizopsis Grulich
- Phedimus Raf. c. 18–20 sp., Asia, Europe
- Pseudosedum A.Berger c. 10–12 sp., C Asia
- Rhodiola L. c. 58–60 sp., Himalaya, Siberia, Europe, N America
- Umbilicus DC.

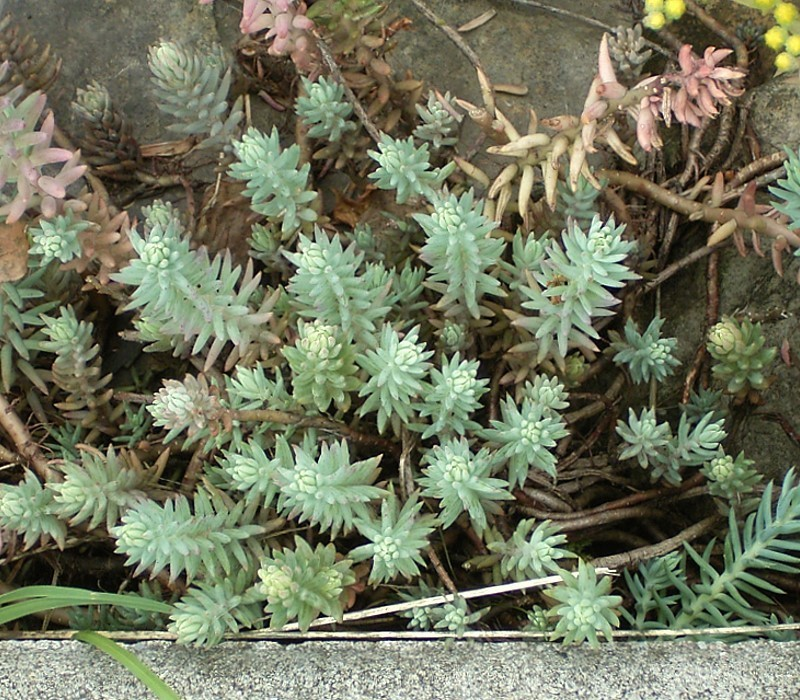
Petrosedum rupestre

=== Petrosedum clade ===
The phylogenetic relatpionships of the Petrosedum clade are not fully resolved, and hence is unplaced, due to discordance in molecular marker analyses. In plastid phylogeny, it is one of the successive sister clades to the remainder of Sempervivoideae, without Telephium. But in Internal transcribed spacer (ITS) phylogeny Petrosedum is sister to Aeonium, with Sempervivum/Jovibarba closest to Sedeae. Previously it had been placed within Sempervivum/Jovibarba. All species of Sedum series Rupestria A.Berger belong in this clade. This series has been elevated to genus rank as Petrosedum, but Sedum series Nana also belongs to this segregated genus, or is at least sister to Petrosedum in this clade. Petrosedum as constituted from series Rupestria consists of 14 species from Europe, the Levant and N Africa. With the inclusion of series Nana from the Near East a further 9–12 species are included in the clade. As such the clade consists of a single genus;

- Petrosedum Grulich c. 23–26 sp. Euro-Mediterranean (Note: Petrosedum was classified as Sedum series Rupestria by some authors)

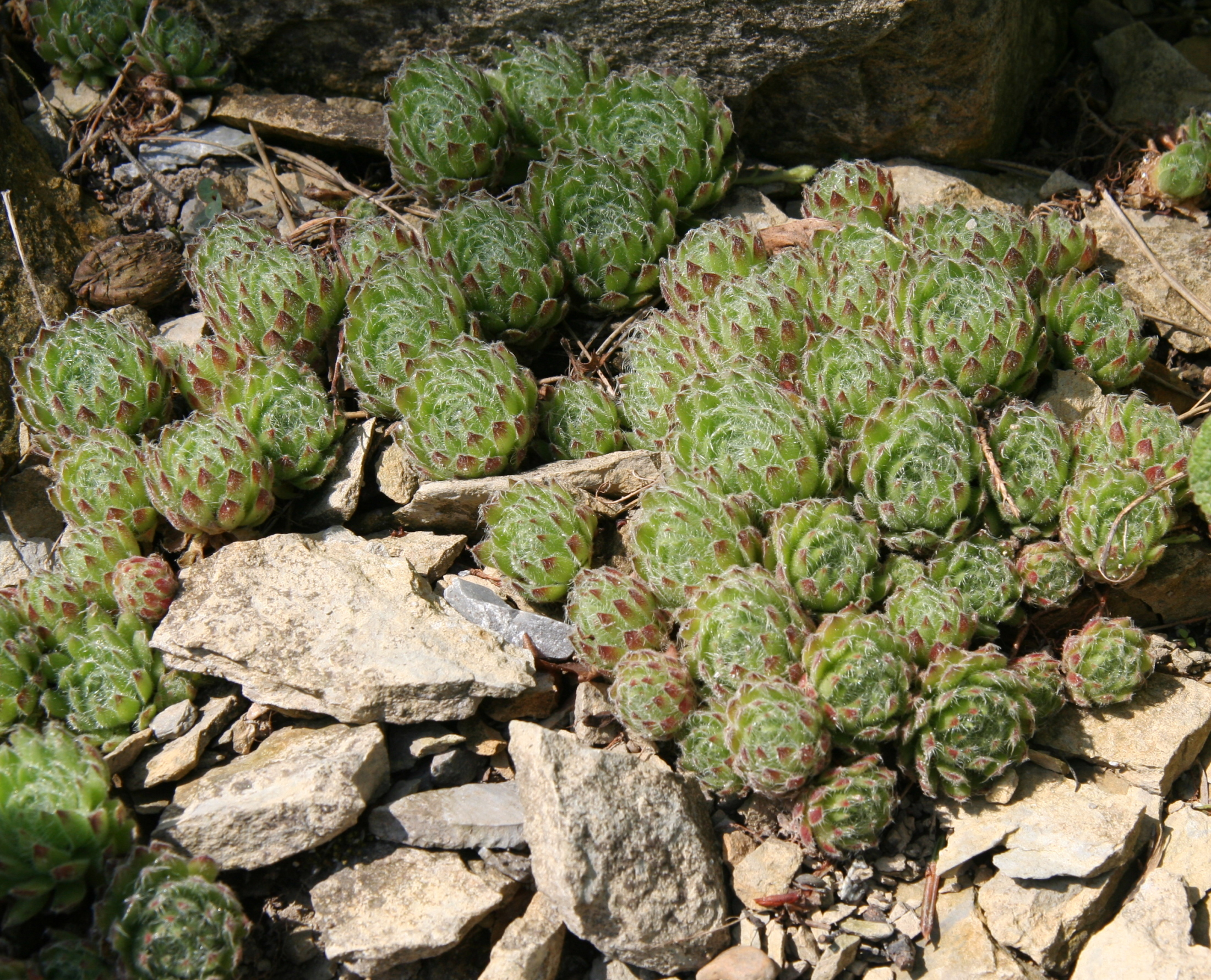
Sempervivum tectorum

=== Sempervivum/Jovibarba clade (Semperviveae tribe Dumort.) ===
Semperviveae have acuminate leaves and polymerous flowers. Two genera, derived from within Sedum, c. 275 species. Earlier treatments considered Jovibarba a section of Sempervivum but has subsequently been demonstrated to be a separate genus. Petrosedum was originally also included in this clade. The two genera are oreophytes and occur predominantly in western Eurasian mountainous regions.

- Jovibarba (DC.) Opiz c. 2 sp.
- Sempervivum L. c. 46 sp.

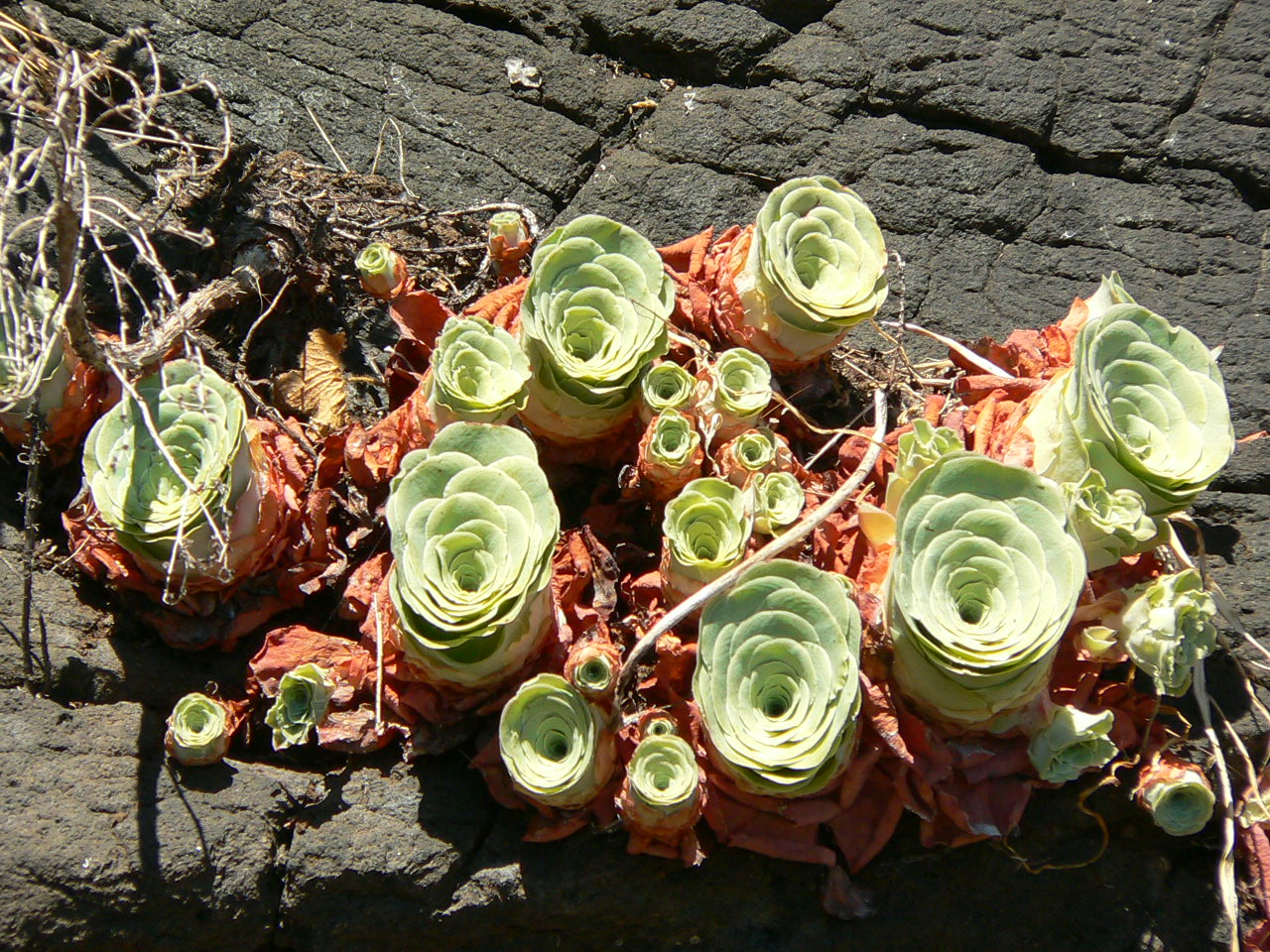
Aeonium aureum

=== Aeonium clade (Aeonieae tribe) Thiede ined. ===
Aeonieae (also referred to as the GAMA clade, for Greenovia, Aeonium, Monanthes and Aichryson), whose distribution is primarily Macaronesia, have polymerous flowers, and include genera derived from within Sedum. The clade includes four genera, including the monotypic Hypagophytum previously thought to be part of subfamily Crassuloideae, and about 64–70 species. It also includes about eight species of Sedum from three series (Monanthoidea, Caerulea, Pubescens) in northwest Africa and one species on Mediterranean islands. However Monanthes and Aeonium appear not to be monophyletic;

- Aeonium Webb & Berthel. (including Greenovia Webb) 39 sp. Macaronesia, Morocco, E Africa
- Aichryson Webb & Berthel. 15 sp. Macaronesia
- Hypagophytum A.Berger 1 sp. Ethiopia
- Monanthes Haw. 10 sp. Macaronesia
- Sedum L. 8 sp. NW Africa

=== Sedeae Fr. ===
Sedeae is the largest tribe of these and has been considered as consisting of two sister clades, Leucosedum and Acre. It contains about 12 genera, mainly derived from within Sedum, and 520 species. While the larger Acre clade is relatively robust, Leucosedum remains paraphyletic. In the largest study of this tribe, four polytomous clades are identified, of which the largest is Acre. Of the remaining three, Rosularia, usually included in Leucosedum, is the smallest. In the remaining two clades, the species of Sedum belong to subgenus Gormania, defined morphologically. Among the other genera, Dudleya and Sedella form a subclade.

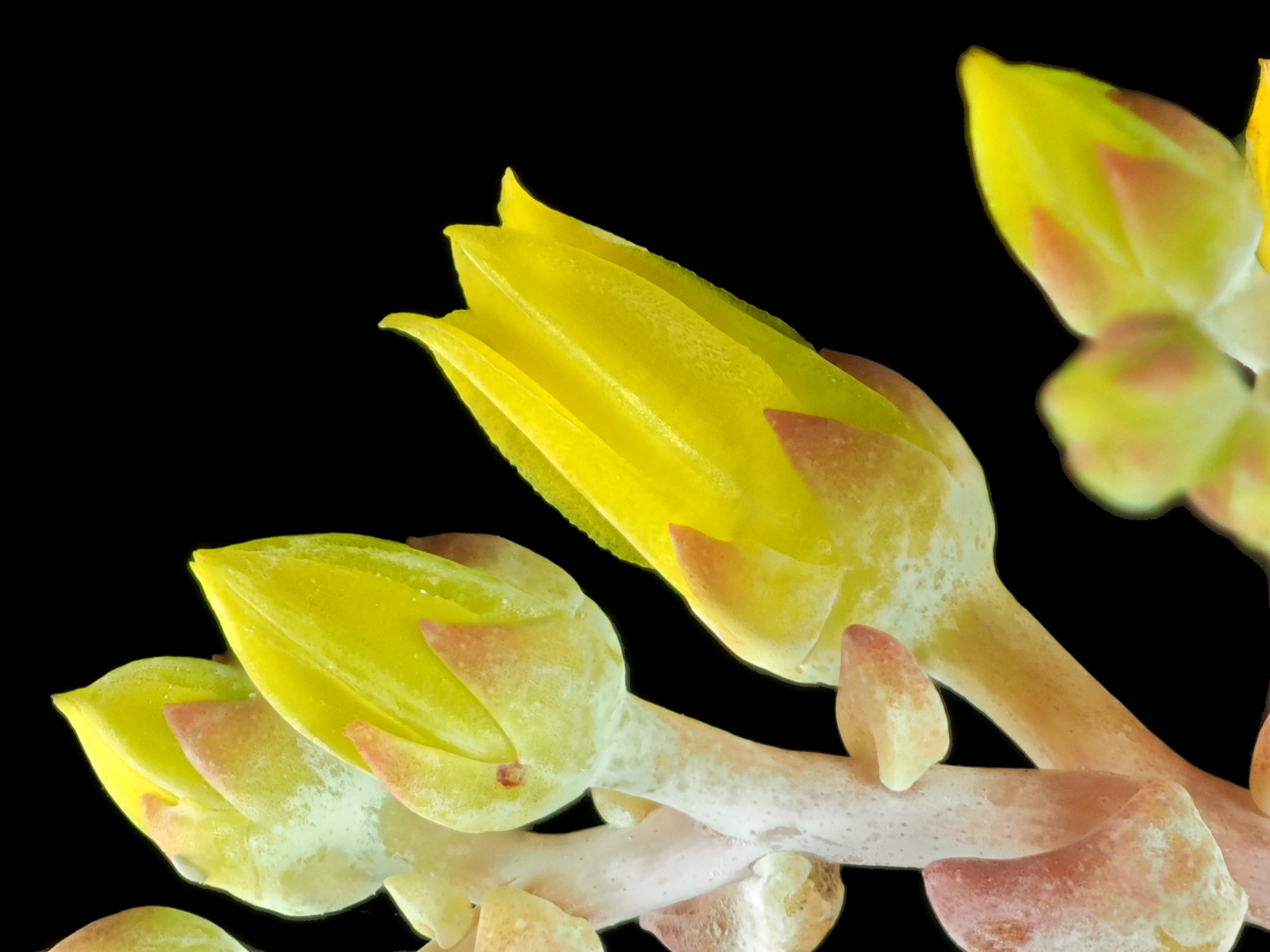
Dudleya caespitosa

==== Leucosedum clade ====
Genera derived from European and Mediterranean Sedum subg. Gormania, with two western North American genera (Dudleya, Sedella, which are sister genera). This clade has the largest topological discordance between the phylogenies defined by ITS and plastid markers. The genera included are:

- Rosularia (DC.) Stapf c. 20 sp., E Europe, Himalaya, Altai
- Dudleya Britton & Rose N America
- Sedella Britton & Rose N America
- Afrovivella A.Berger
- Pistorinia DC. Mediterranean
- Prometheum (A.Berger) H.Ohba c. 8 sp., N Greece, SW Asia
- (Sedum)

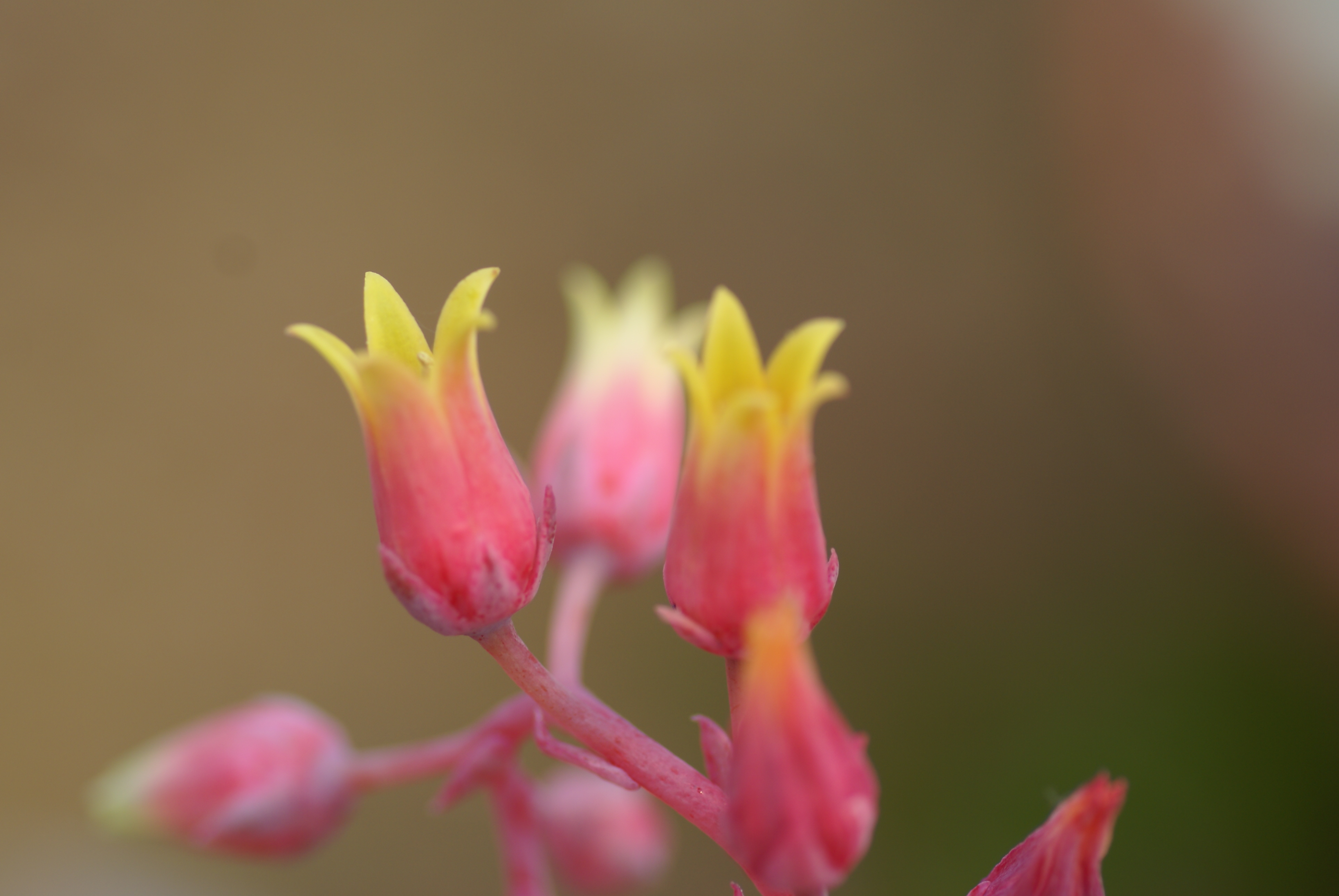
Echeveria agavoides

==== Acre clade ====
The seven genera, including Sedum subgenus Sedum, include 500 species. Villadia, Echeveria and Graptopetalum are non-monophyletic:

- Echeveria DC.
- Graptopetalum Rose
- Lenophyllum Rose c. 7 sp.
- Pachyphytum Link, Klotzsch & Otto
- Thompsonella Britton & Rose
- Villadia Rose
- Sedum L. c. 470 sp. N hemisphere, S. America, N Africa

=== Genera ===
Many of the genera in this subfamily have been considered non-monophyletic. Other than the Sempervivum clade, Sedum has never formed a monophyletic group, but rather is scattered through the remaining clades, and thus is highly polyphyletic (or paraphyletic). This has been referred to as the "Sedum problem". Given the monophyly demonstrated for Aeonieae and Semperviveae (as quite distinct from Sedeae), it has been recommended that those species of Sedum originally found in those tribes, be removed from the genus and reassigned. This includes Sedum series Rupestria from Semperviveae, but collectively account for only a small fraction of the genus. While restricting Sedum to Sedeae simplifies the infrafamilial structure of the genus, its species remain distributed within both clades of this tribe. Sedum, with about 470 species, is by far the largest (and most problematic) genus within the subfamily, and the family Crassulaceae.

=== Evolution and biogeography ===
There is no known fossil record of Crassulaceae. The Crassulaceae family evolved approximately 100 million years ago (mya) in southern Africa with the two most basal phylogenetic branches (Crassula, Kalanchoe) representing the predominantly southern African members. Divergence times are shown in Cladogram III. The family had a gradual evolution, with a basal split between Crassuloideae and the rest of the family (Kalanchoideae, Sempervivoideae) at 82 mya, and Sempervivoideae splitting from Kalanchoideae at 71 mya. The Sempervivoideae subsequently dispersed north to the Mediterranean region, and from there to Eastern Europe and Asia (Sempervivum and Leucosedum clades), with multiple groups spreading over the three continents of the Northern Hemisphere. The Telephium clade splitting from the rest of the subfamily at 66 mya. This was followed by the Petrosedum and Aeonium clades at 56 mya and Sempervivum/Jovibarda at 52 mya. The remaining two clades, constituting Sedeae (Leucosedum and Acre) separating from each other at 48 mya. Two lineages from the European Crassulaceae eventually dispersed to North America and underwent subsequent diversification. The Aeonium clade dispersed from northern Africa to adjacent Macaronesia.

== Bibliography ==
=== Books ===
- Eggli, Urs, ed. (2003). Illustrated Handbook of Succulent Plants: Crassulaceae. Springer Science & Business Media. doi:10.1007/978-3-642-55874-0. ISBN 978-3-642-55874-0.
- Thiede, J; Eggli, U (2007). "Crassulaceae". In Kubitzki, Klaus (ed.). Berberidopsidales, Buxales, Crossosomatales, Fabales p.p., Geraniales, Gunnerales, Myrtales p.p., Proteales, Saxifragales, Vitales, Zygophyllales, Clusiaceae Alliance, Passifloraceae Alliance, Dilleniaceae, Huaceae, Picramniaceae, Sabiaceae. Springer. pp. 83–119. ISBN 978-3-540-32214-6. (full text at ResearchGate)

=== Articles ===
- Carrillo-Reyes, Pablo; Sosa, Victoria; Mort, Mark E. (October 2009). "Molecular phylogeny of the Acre clade (Crassulaceae): Dealing with the lack of definitions for Echeveria and Sedum" (PDF). Molecular Phylogenetics and Evolution. 53 (1): 267–276. Bibcode:2009MolPE..53..267C. doi:10.1016/j.ympev.2009.05.022. PMID 19482091.
- Gallo, Lorenzo (24 August 2017a). "Towards a review of the genus Petrosedum (Crassulaceae): Taxonomic and nomenclatural notes on Iberian taxa". Webbia. 72 (2): 207–216. Bibcode:2017Webbi..72..207G. doi:10.1080/00837792.2017.1363978.
- Gallo, Lorenzo (9 May 2017). "Nomenclatural novelties in Petrosedum (Crassulaceae)". Phytotaxa. 306 (2): 169. Bibcode:2017Phytx.306..169G. doi:10.11646/phytotaxa.306.2.8.
- Gontcharova, S. B.; Artyukova, E. V.; Gontcharov, A. A. (June 2006). "Phylogenetic relationships among members of the subfamily Sedoideae (Crassulaceae) inferred from the ITS region sequences of nuclear rDNA" (PDF). Russian Journal of Genetics. 42 (6): 654–661. doi:10.1134/S102279540606010X. Archived from the original (PDF) on 2017-08-09.
- Gontcharova, Svetlana B.; Gontcharov, Andrey A. (2007). "Molecular Phylogenetics of Crassulaceae" (PDF). Genes, Genomes and Genomics. 1 (1): 40–46.
- Gontcharova, S. B.; Gontcharov, A. A. (11 October 2009). "Molecular phylogeny and systematics of flowering plants of the family Crassulaceae DC". Molecular Biology. 43 (5): 794–803. doi:10.1134/S0026893309050112.
- Grulich, Vit (1984). "Generic division of Sedoideae in Europe and the adjacent regions" (PDF). Preslia. 56: 29–45.
- Hart, H. 't (1995). "The evolution of the Sedum acre group (Crassulaceae)" (PDF). Bocconea. 5: 119–128.
- Hart, H.'t (1997). "Diversity within Mediterranean Crassulaceae" (PDF). Lagascalia. 1 (2): 93–100.
- Lim, Mi Sang; Choi, Sun Hee (2018). "Estimation of Phylogeny of Nineteen Sedoideae Species Cultivated in Korea Inferred from Chloroplast DNA Analysis". The Horticulture Journal. 87 (1): 132–139. doi:10.2503/hortj.OKD-087.
- Mayuzumi, Shinzo; Ohba, Hideaki (2004). "The Phylogenetic Position of Eastern Asian Sedoideae (Crassulaceae) Inferred from Chloroplast and Nuclear DNA Sequences". Systematic Botany. 29 (3): 587–598. Bibcode:2004SysBo..29..587M. doi:10.1600/0363644041744329. ISSN 0363-6445. JSTOR 25063994.
- Messerschmid, Thibaud F.E.; Klein, Johannes T.; Kadereit, Gudrun; Kadereit, Joachim W. (4 September 2020). "Linnaeus's folly – phylogeny, evolution and classification of Sedum (Crassulaceae) and Crassness subfamily Sempervivoideae". Taxon tax.12316. doi:10.1002/tax.12316.
- Mort, Mark E.; Soltis, Douglas E.; Soltis, Pamela S.; Francisco-Ortega, Javier; Santos-Guerra, Arnoldo (January 2001). "Phylogenetic relationships and evolution of Crassulaceae inferred from matK sequence data". American Journal of Botany. 88 (1): 76–91. doi:10.2307/2657129. JSTOR 2657129. PMID 11159129.
- Mort, Mark E; O'Leary, T. Ryan; Carrillo-Reyes, Pablo; et al. (December 2010). "Phylogeny and evolution of Crassulaceae: Past, present, and future". Biodiversity & Ecology. 3: 69–86.
- Nikulin, Arthur; Vyacheslav Nikulin, Vyacheslav; Gontcharov, Andrey (October 2015). "To the question of phylogenetic structure of the tribe Telephieae (Sempervivoideae, Crassulaceae) based on ITS rDNA sequence comparisons". Botanicheskii Zhurnal (in Russian). 100 (10): 1030–1040.
- Nikulin, Vyacheslav Yu.; Gontcharova, Svetlana B.; Stephenson, Ray; Gontcharov, Andrey A. (September 2016). "Phylogenetic relationships between Sedum L. and related genera (Crassulaceae) based on ITS rDNA sequence comparisons". Flora. 224: 218–229. Bibcode:2016FMDFE.224..218N. doi:10.1016/j.flora.2016.08.003.
- Ohba, Hideaki; Bartholomew, Bruce M; Turland, Nicholas J; Kunjun, Fu (2000). "New Combinations in Phedimus (Crassulaceae)". Novon. 10 (4): 400–402. Bibcode:2000Novon..10..400O. doi:10.2307/3392995. JSTOR 3392995.
- Ohba, H (1978). "Generic and infrageneric classification of the old world sedoideae crassulaceae". Journal of the Faculty of Science University of Tokyo Section III Botany. 12 (4): 139–193.
- Reveal, James L (2012). "An outline of a classification scheme for extant flowering plants" (PDF). Phytoneuron. 37: 1–221.
- Soltis, D. E.; Mort, M. E.; Latvis, M.; Mavrodiev, E. V.; O'Meara, B. C.; Soltis, P. S.; Burleigh, J. G.; Rubio de Casas, R. (29 April 2013). "Phylogenetic relationships and character evolution analysis of Saxifragales using a supermatrix approach". American Journal of Botany. 100 (5): 916–929. Bibcode:2013AmJB..100..916S. doi:10.3732/ajb.1300044. PMID 23629845.

=== Websites ===
- "International Crassulaceae Network".
- Fu, Kunjun; Ohba, Hideaki; Gilbert, Michael G. (2004). "Crassulaceae Candolle". p. 202., in Flora of China online vol. 8
