= List of works by William Jackson Hooker =

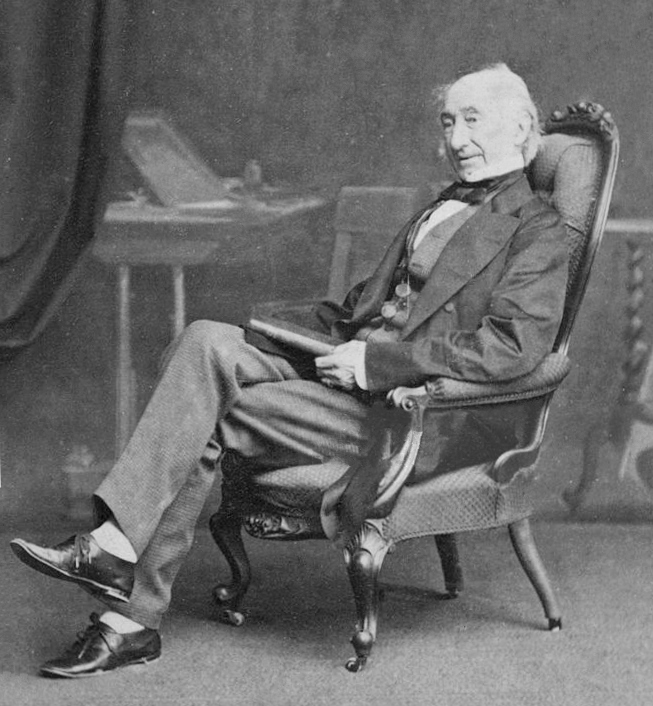
William Jackson Hooker in c.1864

This is an incomplete list of works by William Jackson Hooker KH FRS FRSE FLS DCL (6 July 1785 – 12 August 1865), an English botanist and botanical illustrator, who became the first director of Kew when in 1831 it was recommended to be placed under state ownership as a botanic garden. At Kew he founded the Herbarium and enlarged the gardens and arboretum, The standard author abbreviation Hook. is used to indicate this person as the author when citing a botanical name.

== Illustrations in other works ==
- 1808. Turner, Dawson, Fuci, sive, Plantarum Fucorum generi a botanicis ascriptarum icones descriptiones et historia (Historia fucorum) (4 volumes)

== Works ==
=== Books ===
- 1813. Journal of a Tour in Iceland in the Summer of 1809 (2 volumes)
- 1816. British jungermanniae: being a history and description, with colored figures, of each species of the genus, and microscopical analyses of the parts
- 1818. Musci exotici: containing figures and descriptions of new or little known foreign mosses and other cryptoganic subjects
- 1818. Muscologia Britannica; containing the mosses of Great Britain & Ireland
- 1823-7. Exotic Flora, indicating such of the specimens as are deserving cultivation (3 volumes)
- 1825. Catalogue of Plants in the Glasgow Botanic Garden
- 1826. 'Botanical Appendix' in Parry, William Edward, Journal of a third voyage for the discovery of a north-west passage from the Atlantic to the Pacific: performed in the years 1824-25, in His Majesty's ships, Hecla and Fury, under the orders of Captain William E. Parry, R.N., F.R.S., and commander of the expedition
- 1831. Icones filicum (IIcones filicum ad eas potissimum species illustrandas destinata, qua hactenus, vel in herbariis delituerunt prorsus incognitae, vel saltem nondum per icones botanicis innotuerunt. Figures and descriptions of ferns, principally of such as have been altogether unnoticed by botanists, or as have not yet been correctly figure), in concert with Dr R. K. Greville (2 volumes)
- 1833, 1838. The British Flora (2 volumes)
- 1830–1842. The Journal of Botany (4 volumes)
- 1835, 1836. Companion to the Botanical Magazine (2 volumes)
- 1837–54. Icones Plantarum (10 volumes)
- 1840. Flora Boreali-Americana, or the Botany of the Northern Parts of British America '(2 volumes)
- 1841. The Botany of Captain Beechey's voyage
- 1842. Genera filicum, or, Illustrations of the ferns, and other allied genera
- 1842–1848. The London Journal of Botany (7 volumes)
- 1846–1864. Species Filicum: Volume 1 (1858); Volume 2 (1858); Volume 3 (1858); Volume 4 (1846); Volume 5 (1858)
- 1847. Kew Gardens; or, a popular guide to the Royal Botanic Gardens of Kew
- 1847. Description of Victoria regia, or, Great water-lily of South America
- 1849. A Century of Orchidaceous Plants
- 1849–1857. Hooker's Journal of Botany and Kew Garden Miscellany (9 volumes)
- 1849. Niger Flora
- 1854. A Century of Ferns
- 1859. Filices Exoticae, or Coloured Figures and Descriptions of Exotic Ferns
- 1861. The British Ferns
- 1864. A Second Century of Ferns

=== Articles ===
- 1824. Some Account of a Collection of Arctic Plants formed by Edward Sabine, Esq., F.R.S. and L.S., Captain in the Royal Artillery, during a Voyage in the Polar Seas in the Year 1823
- 1827–65. Curtis's Botanical Magazine (38 volumes)
