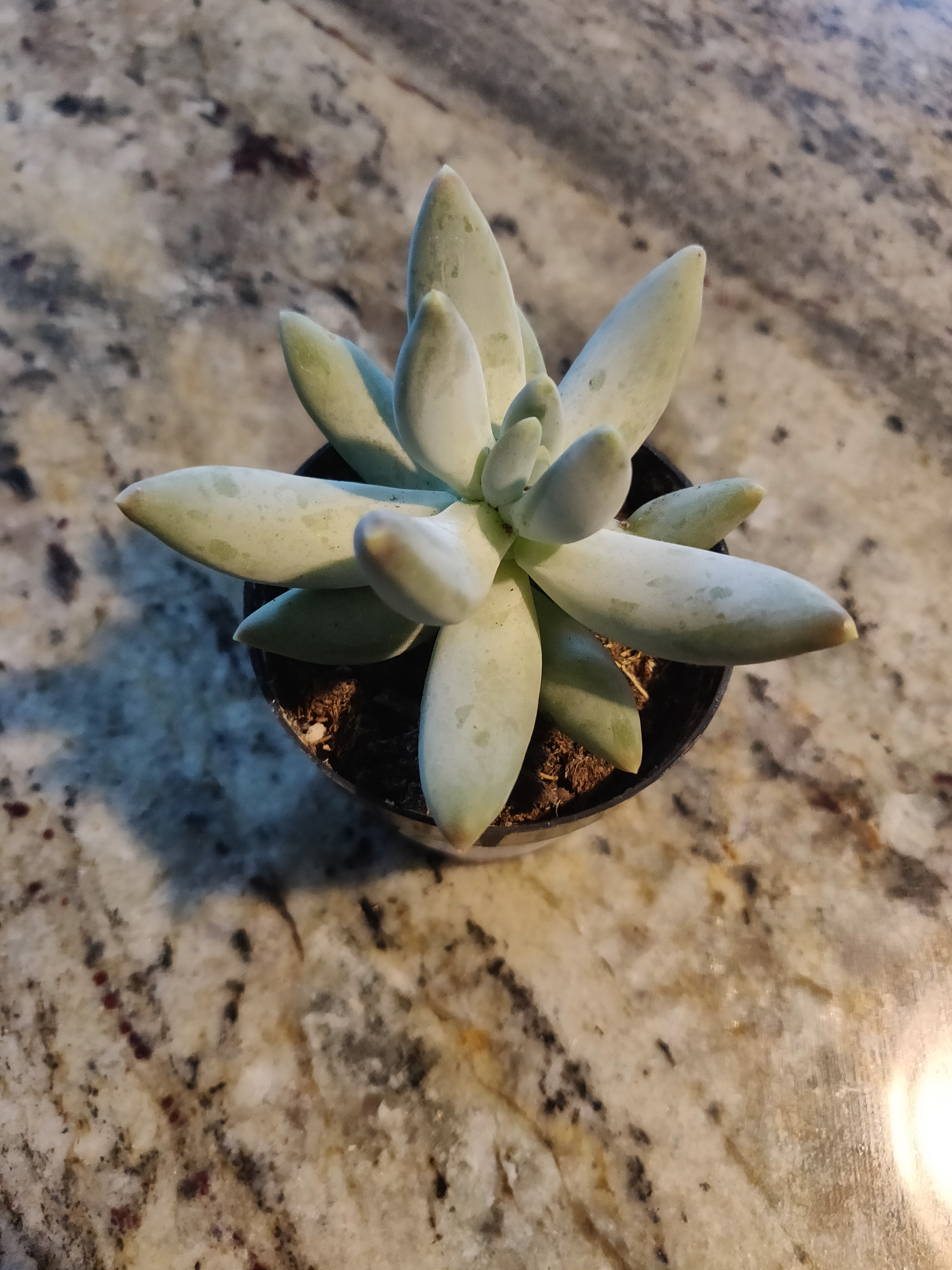

Scientific classification
- Kingdom: Plantae
- Clade: Tracheophytes
- Clade: Angiosperms
- Clade: Eudicots
- Order: Saxifragales
- Family: Crassulaceae
- Genus: Pachyphytum
- Species: P. bracteosum

Binomial name
- Pachyphytum bracteosum Klotzsch

= Pachyphytum bracteosum =

Species of succulent

Pachyphytum bracteosum, the large-bracted pachyphytum, is a perennial succulent native to Mexico, occurring on rocks at altitudes between 1,200–1,800 m (3,900–5,900 ft). The succulent has a diploid number of 66 or 132. The closest relatives of the plant are Pachyphytum oviferum and Pachyphytum longifolium.

== Description ==
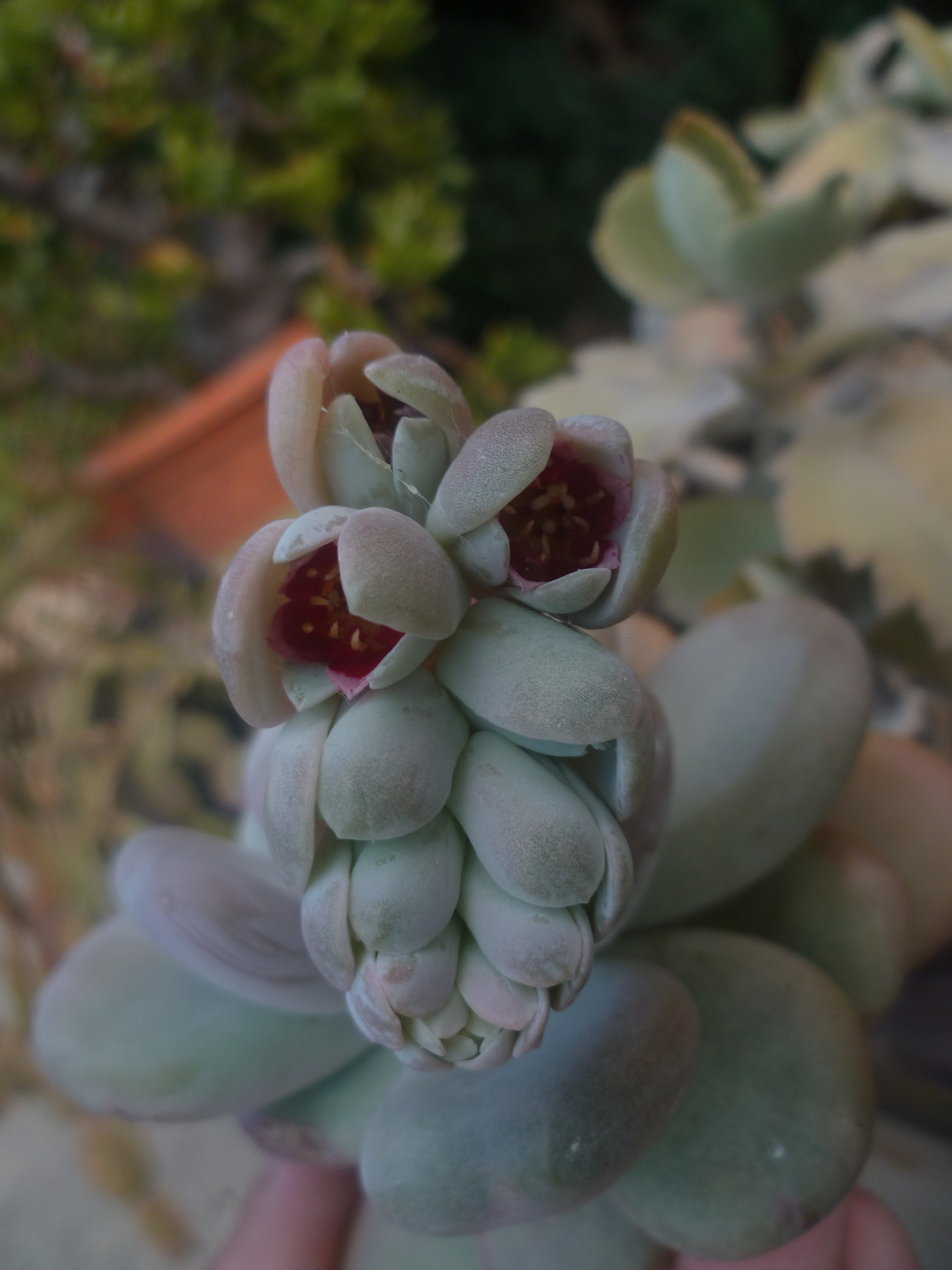
The plant flowering

Pachyphytum bracteosum is a leafy and fleshy succulent. The leafy stems grow up to 30 cm (12 in) long and 25–38 mm (0.98–1.50 in) thick. Fallen leaves form circular leaf scars low on the stem. The purplish or bluish green leaves are thick and flattened. The leaves are oblanceolate and terete, growing upwards of 5 cm (2.0 in) long. Lower leaves grow at a right angle to the stem; upper leaves are erect or curved. The peduncles grow upwards of 30 cm (12 in) long. The simple and elongate flowering stem grows 20–61 cm (7.9–24.0 in) long. The flowering stem is curved at the apex and is secund. The numerous bracts are arranged in two imbricated rows and have short pedicels. The five sepals are unequal, with two long obtuse, lateral sepals and three other shorter sepals. The lateral sepals are oblong and approximately 8.4 mm (0.33 in) long. The dark red corolla has five spreading lobes and is about 5.1 mm (0.20 in) long. The five stamens that alternate with the petals are free from the corolla, while the other five are borne on the petals. The five erect carpels each have a broad scale at their base. The anthers are ovate, the styles are subulate, and the stigmas are capitate.

The plant flowers in the summer.
