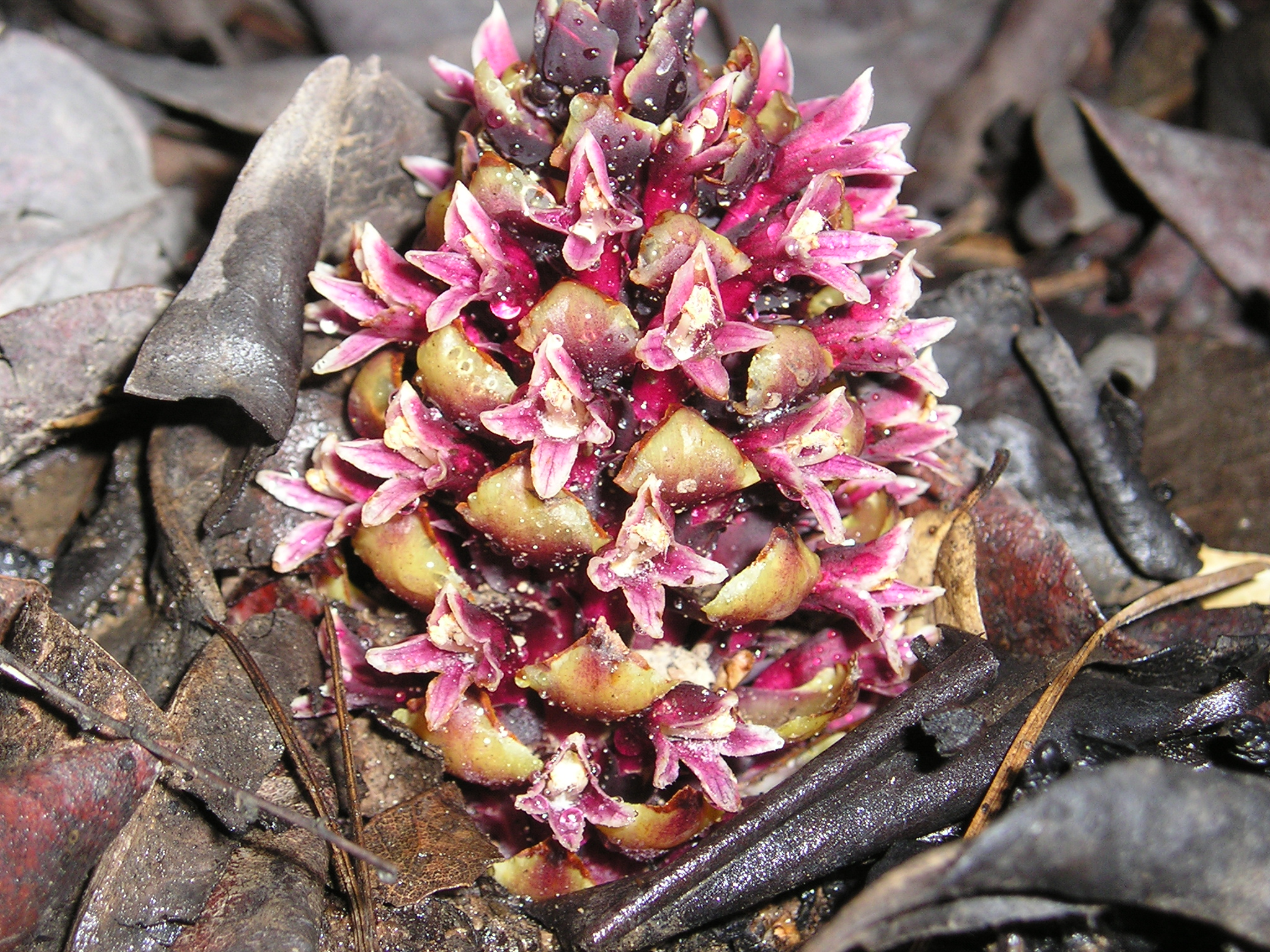

Scientific classification
- Kingdom: Plantae
- Clade: Tracheophytes
- Clade: Angiosperms
- Clade: Eudicots
- Clade: Asterids
- Order: Lamiales
- Family: Orobanchaceae
- Genus: Kopsiopsis
- Species: K. strobilacea

Binomial name
- Kopsiopsis strobilacea (A.Gray) Beck

= Kopsiopsis strobilacea =

Species of plant

Kopsiopsis strobilacea, the California groundcone, is a species of parasitic plant in the family Orobanchaceae. It is native to California and southern Oregon, where it grows in wooded areas and chaparral. It is a parasite of Arbutus menziesii and inland manzanitas, which it parasitizes by penetrating them with haustoria to tap nutrients. The groundcone is visible aboveground as a dark purplish or reddish to brown inflorescence up to 18 cm (7.1 in) long. Pale-margined purple flowers emerge from between the overlapping bracts.

Formerly considered Boschniakia strobilacea, some taxonomists now place it in the genus Kopsiopsis on the basis of phylogenetic evidence. Morphological evidence indicates that this species may have exchanged genetics with Kopsiopsis hookeri in areas where their distribution overlaps.
