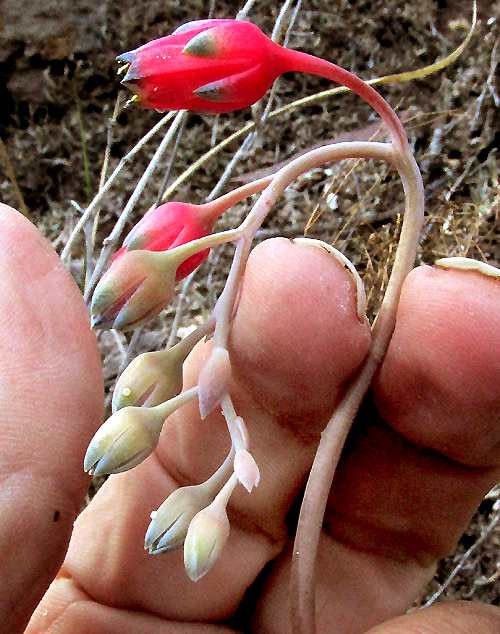
- Little Jewel, Pachyphytum compactum

Scientific classification
- Kingdom: Plantae
- Clade: Tracheophytes
- Clade: Angiosperms
- Clade: Eudicots
- Order: Saxifragales
- Family: Crassulaceae
- Genus: Pachyphytum
- Species: P. compactum

Binomial name
- Pachyphytum compactum Rose, 1911

Synonyms
- Pachyphytum compactum var. weinbergii E.Walther (1934)

= Pachyphytum compactum =

Species of flowering plant

Pachyphytum compactum, often known as little jewel, is a flowering plant belonging to the Family Crassulaceae.

== Description ==
Pachyphytum compactum displays these distinguishing features:

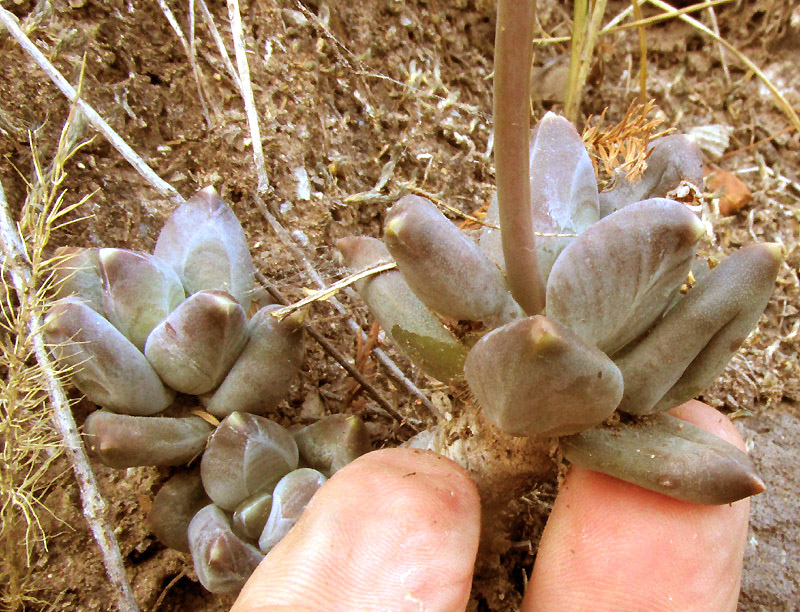
Pachyphytum compactum, plants in rosette stage, one with a peduncle

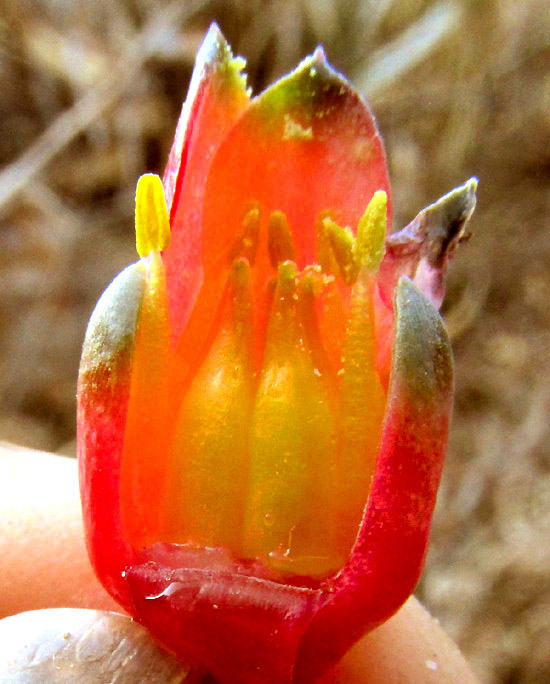
Pachyphytum compactum, dissected flower showing stamens and pistils inside the red corolla

- It's an herbaceous but sometimes slightly woody, succulent plant.
- The plant either bears no stem and thus forms a rosette, or with age develops a stem up to 30 cm (12 in) tall.
- The stem can branch at the base, producing offsets, which ultimately can form dense colonies.
- Leaves are semi-rounded and up to 40 mm × 16 mm × 12 mm (1 5/8 in × 5/8 in × 1/2 in); their upper surfaces are slightly angled, or "faceted; on stemmed plants they cluster at the stem's apex.
- Leaves are covered with a grayish, bluish, or whitish waxy coating or bloom that easily rubs off; they're glaucous.
- Inflorescences stand atop pale green to reddish peduncles up to 40 cm (16 in) tall, and which bear conspicuous scale-like bracts.
- Inflorescences are "scorpioid cymes", meaning that their tops are curved like a scorpion's tail, with the lowest flower blooming first, the higher ones successively opening in ascending order.
- Sepals are dark rose to reddish, with green tips, and glaucous.
- Petals are bicolored reddish to orangish with green tips.
- Stamens bear yellow, pollen-producing filaments.
- nectar glands up to 3 mm (1/8 in) high occur inside the flower.
- Fruits are follicle-type, opening in a star shape, and producing numerous seeds.

== Distribution ==
Pachyphytum compactum is endemic just to highland central Mexico, in parts of the states of Guanahuato, Querétaro and Hidalgo.

== Habitat ==
In its native habitat, Pachyphytum compactum grows on rocky outcrops, in xeric scrubland, and tropical deciduous forests, at elevations of 1900–2250 meters (~6200–7400 feet). It flowers from February to July.

== In gardening ==
With is very limited natural distribution, Pachyphytum compactum is seldom encountered in the wild. However, known as Little Jewel, it's widely used in rock gardens, xeriscaping and as a potted houseplant. It's favored for its drought resistance, its unusual and attractive foliage, and its tendency to produce offsets that over time form a dense, succulent mat. One merchant praises the leaves' angular edges on their upper surfaces, its "facets", saying that the leaves are sculpted, almost "chiseled stone" or "cut gemstone" in appearance. Sometimes the species is referred to as "Mini Moon Stones."

The species doesn't like cold temperatures. While it tolerates intense sunlight and high heat, it suffers when temperatures drop below 7 °C (45 °F), and temperatures below -6.7 °C (20 °F) kill the plant.

== Taxonomy ==
The type specimen was collected by C. A. Purpus at Ixmiquilpan, Hidalgo, Mexico, in March 1910. The type is on file at the United States National Herbarium as #574499.

A natural hybrid between Pachyphytum compactum and P. viride has been reported on El Mexicano mountain, in the municipality of Colón, in Querétaro state. This location is the only known place where the two parent species have overlapping distributions. This isn't surprising, since it's been reported that Pachyphytum along with the genera of Echeveria, Graptopetalum, Lenophyllum and Villadia all are part of a giant comparium. A comparium is a group of organisms capable interbreeding whether or not fertile hybrids result.

== Etymology ==
In the genus name Pachyphytum, the Pachy- derives from the Ancient Greek pachys (παχυς), meaning "thick, fat". The -phytum is Greek for phyton (φυτον), for "plant, tree". Pachyphytum species are "fat plants" because of their thick, succulent leaves.

The species name compactum is New Latin based on the Latin compactus meaning "concentrated". In its rosette form, Pachyphytum compactum is concentrated in one place, but if its stems branch, it can become gangling.
