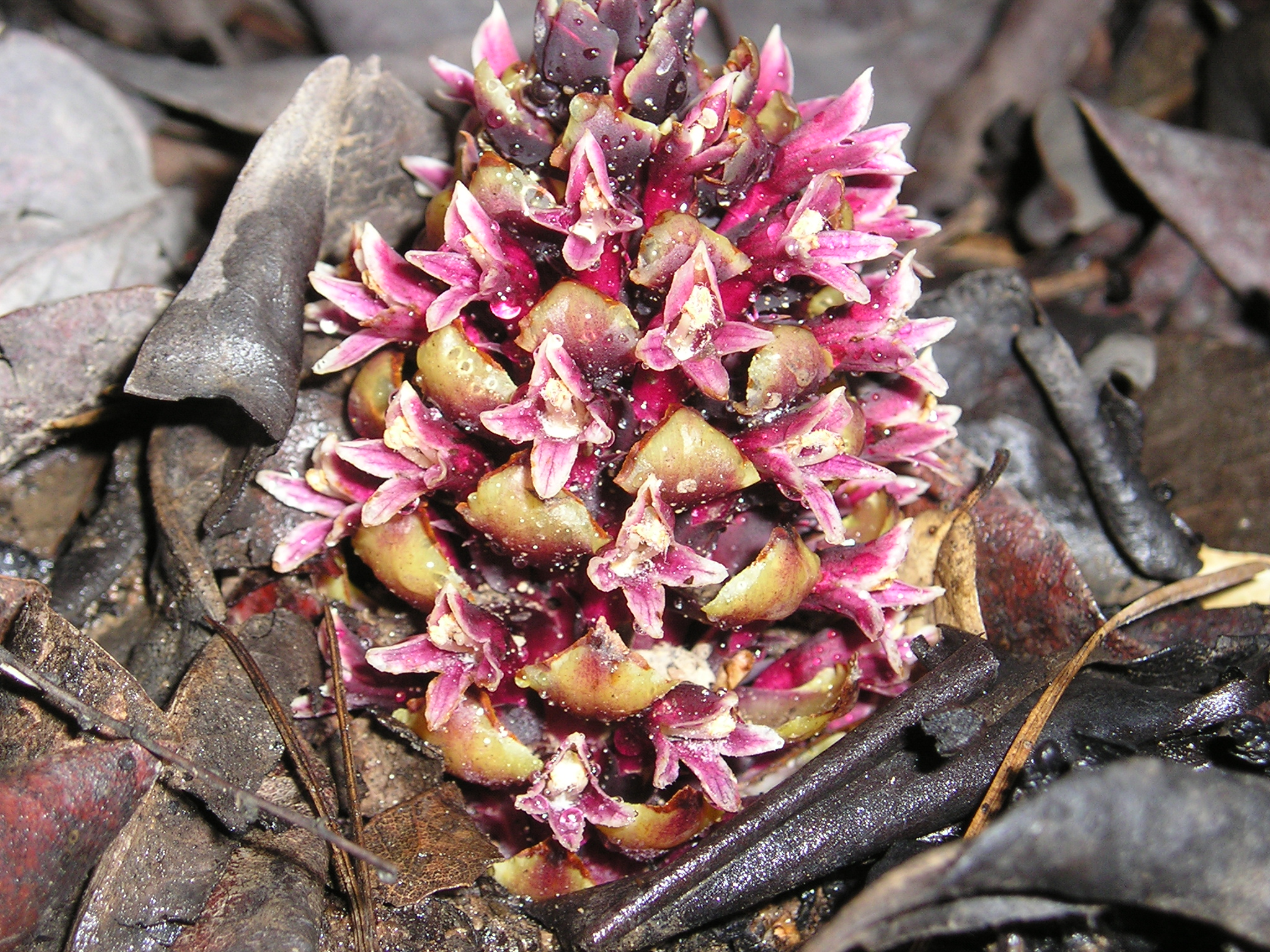
- Kopsiopsis strobilacea

Scientific classification
- Kingdom: Plantae
- Clade: Tracheophytes
- Clade: Angiosperms
- Clade: Eudicots
- Clade: Asterids
- Order: Lamiales
- Family: Orobanchaceae
- Tribe: Orobancheae
- Genus: Kopsiopsis (Beck) Beck

Synonyms
- Orobanche sect. Kopsiopsis Beck

= Kopsiopsis =

Genus of flowering plants

Kopsiopsis is a small genus of flowering plants in the family Orobanchaceae native to western North America.

== Species ==
As of 2026, Kew's Plants of the World Online accepts two species in the genus Kopsiopsis:

- Kopsiopsis hookeri (Walp.) Govaerts – Vancouver groundcone
- Kopsiopsis strobilacea (A.Gray) Beck – California groundcone

In July of 2026, a new species endemic to Baja California, Kopsiopsis rosea, was described. In the same paper, the authors also used molecular and morphological data to propose reclassifying K. strobilacea as a subspecies of K. hookeri.
