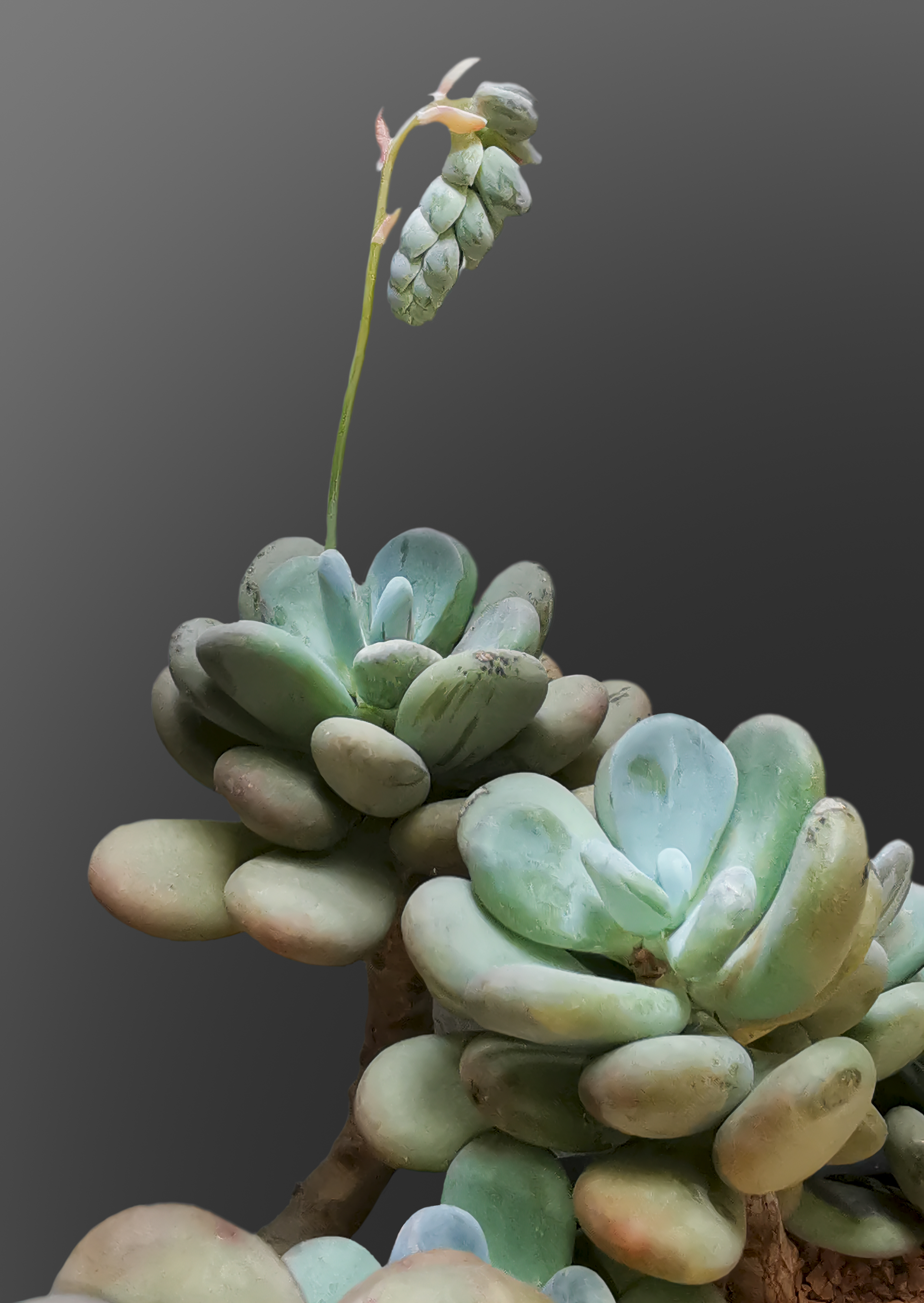
- Pachyphytum oviferum

Scientific classification
- Kingdom: Plantae
- Clade: Tracheophytes
- Clade: Angiosperms
- Clade: Eudicots
- Order: Saxifragales
- Family: Crassulaceae
- Subfamily: Sempervivoideae
- Tribe: Sedeae
- Genus: Pachyphytum; Link, Klotzsch & Otto

Species
- See text

Synonyms
- Diotostemon Salm-Dyck

= Pachyphytum =

Genus of succulents

Pachyphytum is a small genus of succulents in the stonecrop family, Crassulaceae, native to Mexico, where species can be found growing at elevations from 600 to 1,500 metres (2,000 to 4,900 ft) above sea level. The generic name comes from the ancient Greek pachys ('thick') and phyton ('plant'), a reference of the succulent nature of the leaves.

== Description ==
The member species of the genus Pachyphytum are perennial succulent plants, which grow as hairless rosettes on ever-lengthening, somewhat delicate stems. The upright plants grow up to 70 cm when young, and develop into a prostrate growth habit over time (to over 1 meter in length, in some cases). The simple, occasionally basally-branching, shoots can reach a diameter of up to 3.5 cm. The rosettes have a diameter of 6 to 20 cm and are made up of roughly 10 leaves; larger specimens may contain 40, rarely up to 80, clearly separated leaves that are often intensely blue-, teal- or lavender-frosted. Towards the tip, the newer leaves are much tighter and more crowded-together. The youngest leaves are, more or less, erect, later spreading and flattening slightly; the older foliage often curls-back. Leaves are obovate to spatulate or elliptical-oblong to lanceolate and usually end blunted to slightly pointed.

The upright inflorescence emerges laterally from the leaf axils of the uppermost foliage. The lower 10 to 20 cm of the flower stalks are leafless, the upper 6 to 9 cm are covered with basally spurred, leaf-like bracts. The inflorescence is simple and initially overhanging. Later it is erect and bears up to 50 individual flowers. The bracts (brachts) are mostly overlapping and elliptical to obovate or lanceolate in shape. They are, basally, often arrow- to stalk-shaped, encompassing or more or less bidentate spurred.

The flower stalk, which becomes thicker towards the top, has a diameter of 2 to 15 mm. The flowers are five, rarely sixfold and obdiplostemon. The tubular, barrel or bell-shaped, sometimes pentagonal corolla measures 5.5 to 17 mm × 3.5 to 10 mm at the base and 4.5 to 17 mm in diameter at the top. It is white to pink, more rarely orange to red or reddish in color. The elongated to oblanceolate petals are 7–17 mm × 2.5–6 mm in size. The flower tube is usually spread out above the middle and bent back at the time of flowering. On the inside there is usually a red spot above the middle. The stamens are in two circles. The greenish or red styles are indistinctly set off and 1 to 2 mm in size. Pollination is probably by hummingbirds.

The fruits are splaying and open partially to fully at the suture. The obovate seed is smooth, reddish brown and 0.5–0.8 mm × 0.25–0.4 mm in size.

== Distribution and habitat ==
The primary, natural distribution of Pachyphytum is restricted to eastern and central Mexico, where the plants grow on rocky, well-drained slopes at elevations of 600 to 2500 m. Some species, such as P. oviferum and P. hookeri, have been introduced to or established in small locales of other countries within Latin America, such as Brazil, Costa Rica, Ecuador, Peru and Bolivia, among others.

== Species ==
The genus Pachyphytum was established by Heinrich Friedrich Link, Johann Friedrich Klotzsch and Christoph Friedrich Otto in 1841, and first described in the German publication Allgemeine Gartenzeitung ("General Gardening Newspaper”).

According to Joachim Thiede, the genus Pachyphytum includes the following species, which are divided into two sections:

Section	Image	Scientific name	Distribution
Section Diotostemon		Pachyphytum brevifolium Rose	Aguascalientes
Section Diotostemon		Pachyphytum coeruleum J. Meyrán	Mexico
Section Diotostemon		Pachyphytum compactum Rose	Guanajuato, Querétaro
Section Diotostemon		Pachyphytum hookeri (Salm-Dyck) A. Berger	Guanajuato, Hidalgo, Querétaro, San Luis Potosí
Section Diotostemon		Pachyphytum machucae I. García, Glass & see Cházaro Basáñoez, Miguel de Jesús	Mexico
Section Pachyphytum		Pachyphytum brachetii Reyes, González & Gutiérrez	Mexico
Section Pachyphytum		Pachyphytum bracteosum Klotzsch	Hidalgo
Section Pachyphytum		Pachyphytum caesium Kimnach & Moran	Mexico
Section Pachyphytum		Pachyphytum contrerasii E. Pérez-Calix, I. García & Cházaro	Mexico
Section Pachyphytum		Pachyphytum cuicatecanum (J. Reyes, Joel Pérez & Brachet) Kimnach	Mexico
Section Pachyphytum		Pachyphytum fittkaui Moran	Mexico
Section Pachyphytum		Pachyphytum garciae Pérez-Calix & Glass	Mexico
Section Pachyphytum		Pachyphytum glutinicaule Moran	Mexico
Section Pachyphytum		Pachyphytum kimnachii Moran	Mexico
Section Pachyphytum		Pachyphytum longifolium Rose	Mexico
Section Pachyphytum		Pachyphytum oviferum Purpus	México (state), San Luis Potosí
Section Pachyphytum		Pachyphytum rzedowskii I. García, E. Pérez-Calix & Meyrán	Mexico
Section Pachyphytum		Pachyphytum saltense Brachet, Reyes & Mondragón	Mexico (Zacatecas)
Section Pachyphytum		Pachyphytum rogeliocardenasii Pérez-Calix & Torres	N.W. Querétaro
Section Pachyphytum		Pachyphytum viride E.Walther	
Section Pachyphytum		Pachyphytum werdermannii Poelln.	Mexico
