= Notholaena hookeri =

Notholaena hookeri is the name of a fern species, which may refer to:

- Notholaena hookeri E.J.Lowe, described in 1856, now known as Argyrochosma chilensis
- Notholaena hookeri D.C.Eaton, described in 1879, an illegitimate later homonym, now known as Notholaena standleyi
