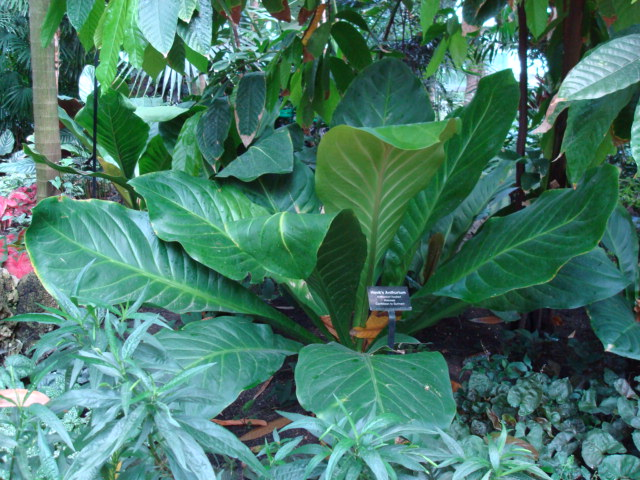

Scientific classification
- Kingdom: Plantae
- Clade: Tracheophytes
- Clade: Angiosperms
- Clade: Monocots
- Order: Alismatales
- Family: Araceae
- Genus: Anthurium
- Species: A. hookeri

Binomial name
- Anthurium hookeri Kunth

= Anthurium hookeri =

Bird's nest anthurium

Species of flowering plant

Anthurium hookeri, commonly called a bird's nest anthurium, is a species of flowering plant in the genus Anthurium. Anthurium hookeri possesses some unique features which include, short internodes, dense roots, and lanceolate cataphylls. The leaves have triangular to D-shaped petioles 2–9 cm long, are rosulate, 10–26 cm wide, 35–89 cm long. The leaves exhibit a scalariforme venation and supervolute vernation. Covering the leaves are tiny black glandular punctuates. The berries produced by the plant are white.

Previously categorized in the Anthurium sect. Pachyneurium which has superficially similar species, its colloquial name refers to the upright, nest-like appearance of its foliage. Specimens sold in the houseplant trade are almost always hybrids, not species.
