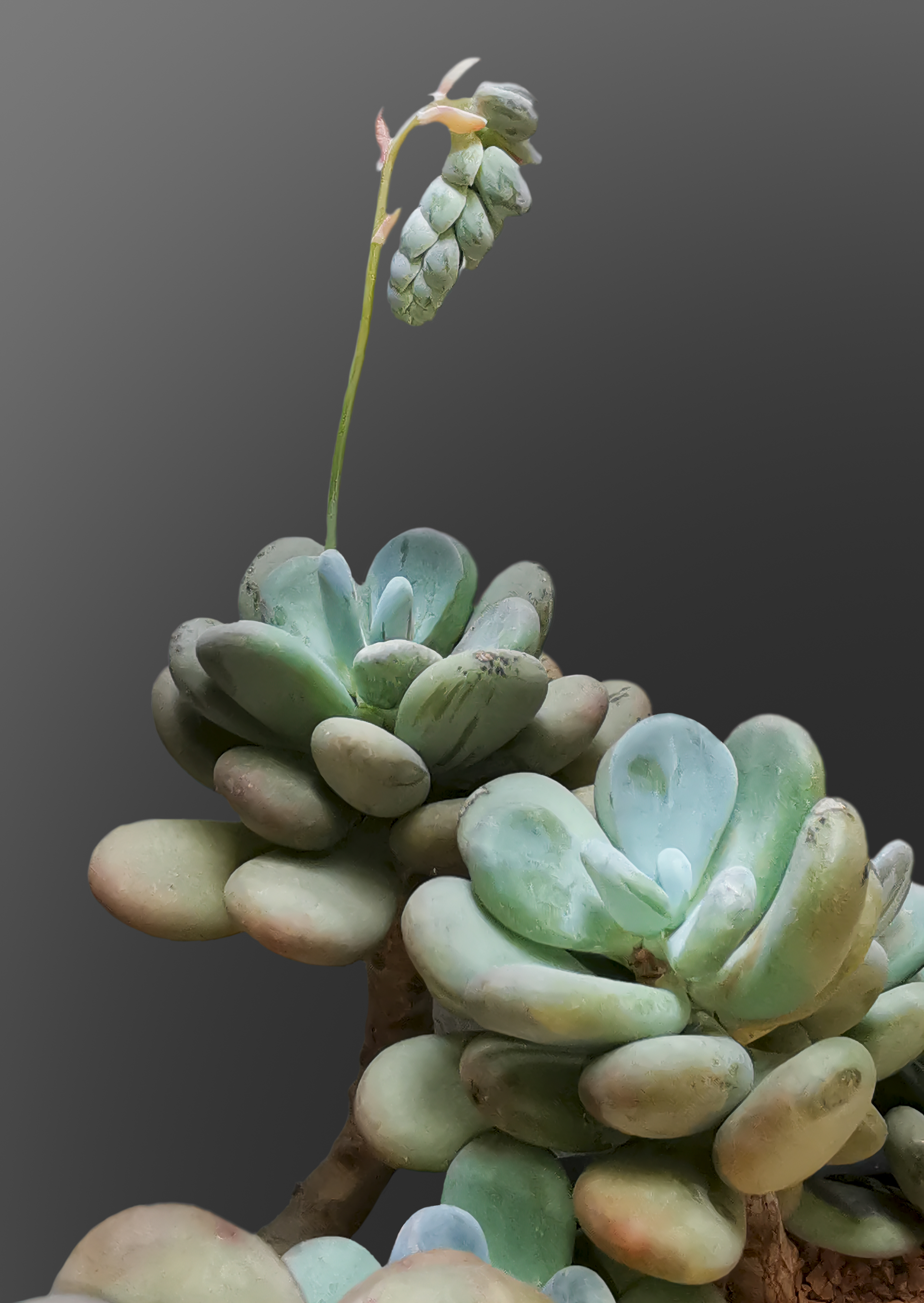

Scientific classification
- Kingdom: Plantae
- Clade: Tracheophytes
- Clade: Angiosperms
- Clade: Eudicots
- Order: Saxifragales
- Family: Crassulaceae
- Genus: Pachyphytum
- Species: P. oviferum

Binomial name
- Pachyphytum oviferum J.A.Purpus

= Pachyphytum oviferum =

Species of succulent

Pachyphytum oviferum, the sugaralmond plant or moonstone, is a species of plant in the genus Pachyphytum.

The meaning of the name Pachyphytum oviferum is thick plant bearing eggs.

It comes from Mexico, in the rocky cliffs of the state of San Luis Potosi at 1200 meters altitude.

== Description ==
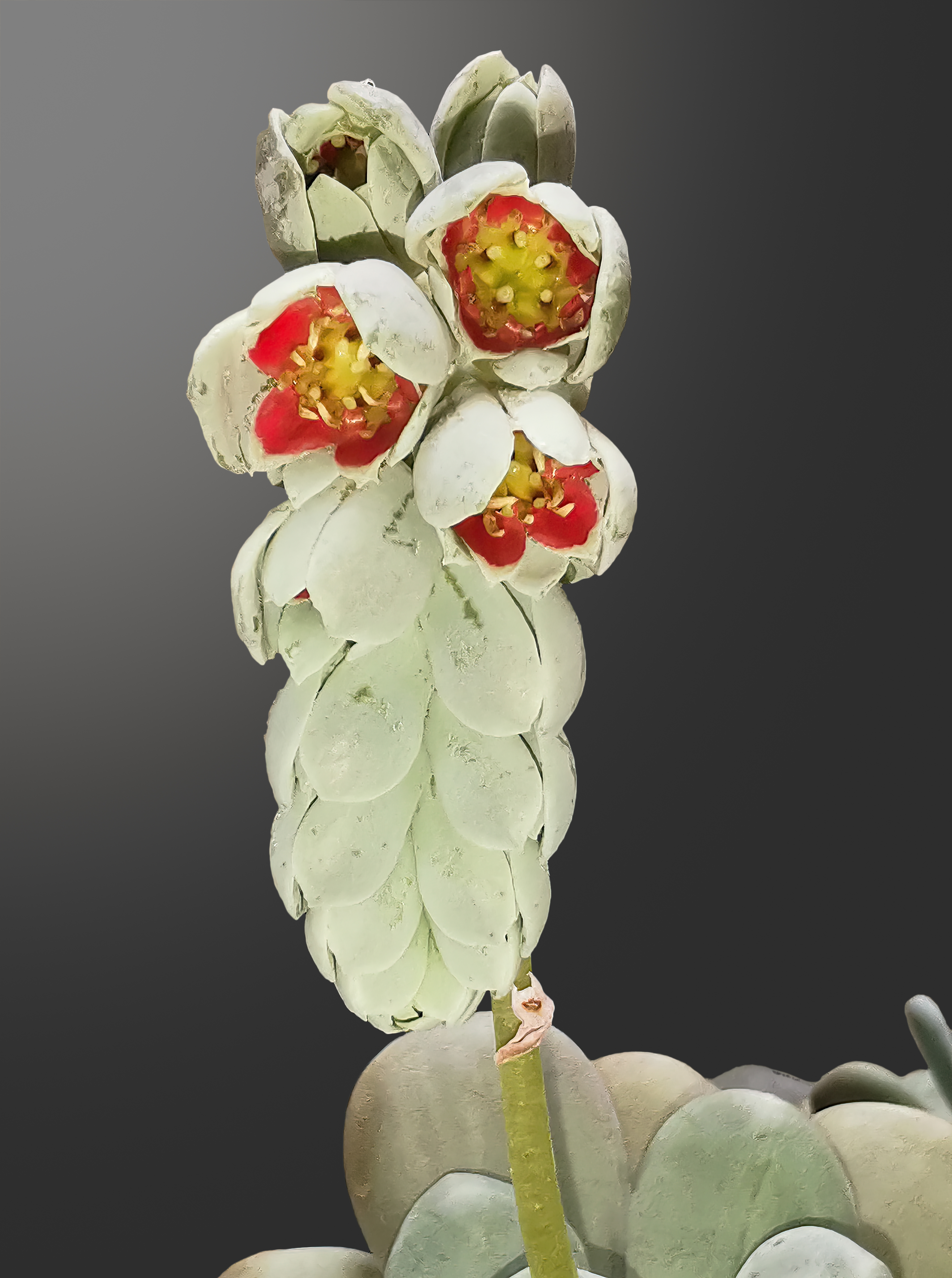
Flowers

The leaves are succulent and egg-shaped, which gave its name to the species.

The stems (20 cm long, 1 cm thick) rise then fall with about 15 leaves. These leaves are 3 to 5 cm long, 1.8 to 3 cm wide and 8 to 17 mm thick.

Leaves are pale blue-green to bluish-purple, looking like a sugared almond confection.

The inflorescence consists of a 30 cm stem bearing scarlet, bell-shaped flowers.

== Bibliography ==
- Urs Eggli (2005). Crassulaceae, Illustrated Handbook of Succulents Plants. Springer. ISBN 978-3540419655.
- J. M. Garcia; L. L. Chavez (2003). Las Crasulaceas de México (in Spanish). Sociedad Mexicana de Cactologia. ISBN 9789685496001.
