= Genera Filicum =

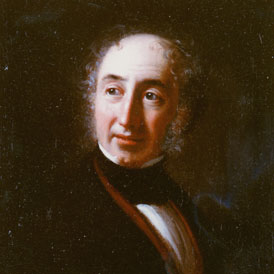
Jackson Hooker

Genera Filicum was one of the important systematic works on the ferns, fully published in London in 1842. This was a collaborative work between Sir William Jackson Hooker, who wrote the text, and Franz Bauer, illustrator. The later Species Filicum by Hooker expanded and updated this work.
