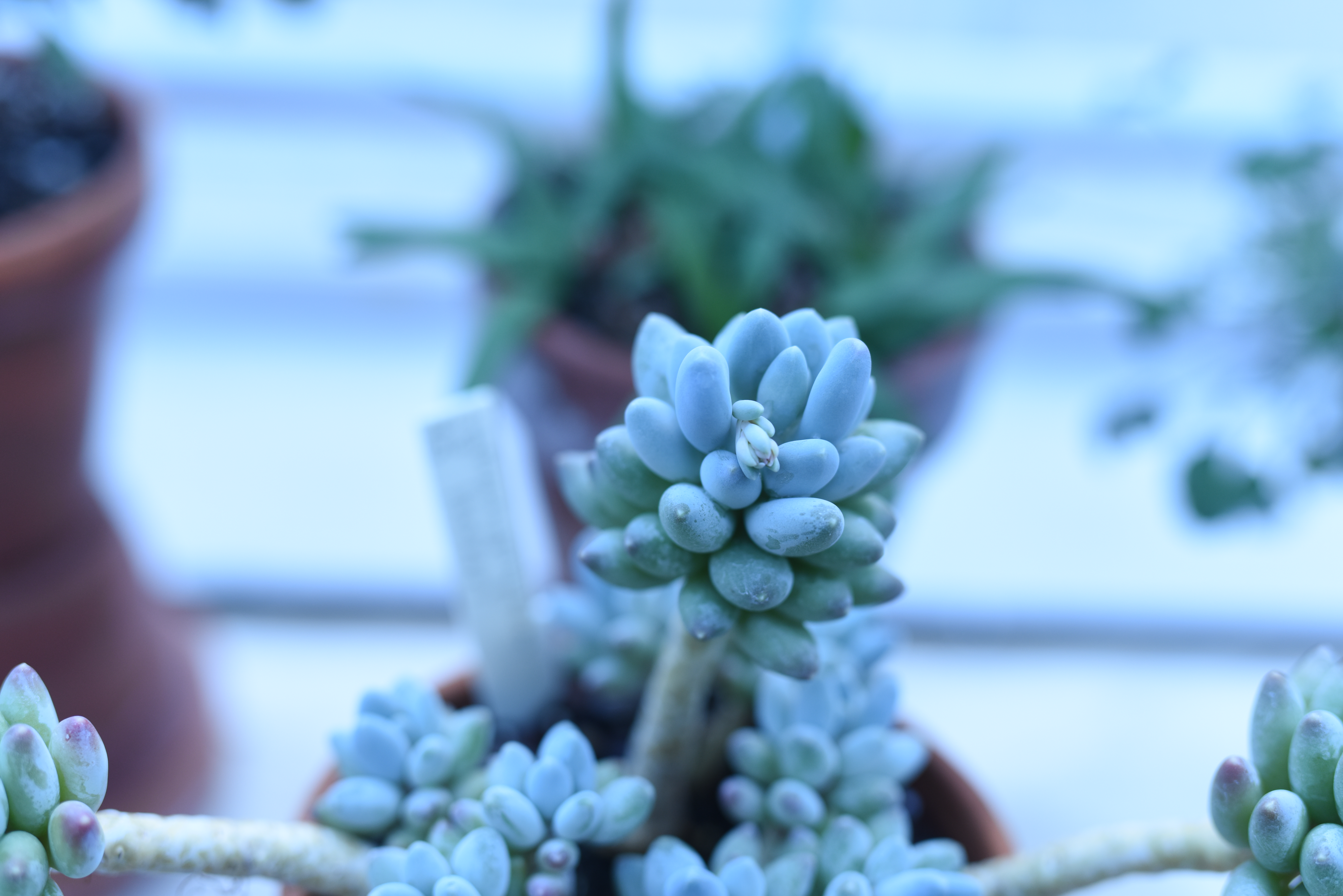
- Pachyphytum hookeri at the Talcott Greenhouse

Scientific classification
- Kingdom: Plantae
- Clade: Embryophytes
- Clade: Tracheophytes
- Clade: Angiosperms
- Clade: Eudicots
- Order: Saxifragales
- Family: Crassulaceae
- Genus: Pachyphytum
- Species: P. hookeri

Binomial name
- Pachyphytum hookeri (Salm-Dyck) A.Berger

Synonyms
- Cotyledon adunca Baker; Diotostemon hookeri Salm-Dyck; Echeveria adunca Ed.Otto; Echeveria hookeri (Salm-Dyck) Lem. Pachyphytum aduncum (Baker) Rose; Pachyphytum roseum Baker; Pachyphytum uniflorum Rose

= Pachyphytum hookeri =

Species of plant

Pachyphytum hookeri is a species of plant in the genus Pachyphytum of the family Crassulaceae.
