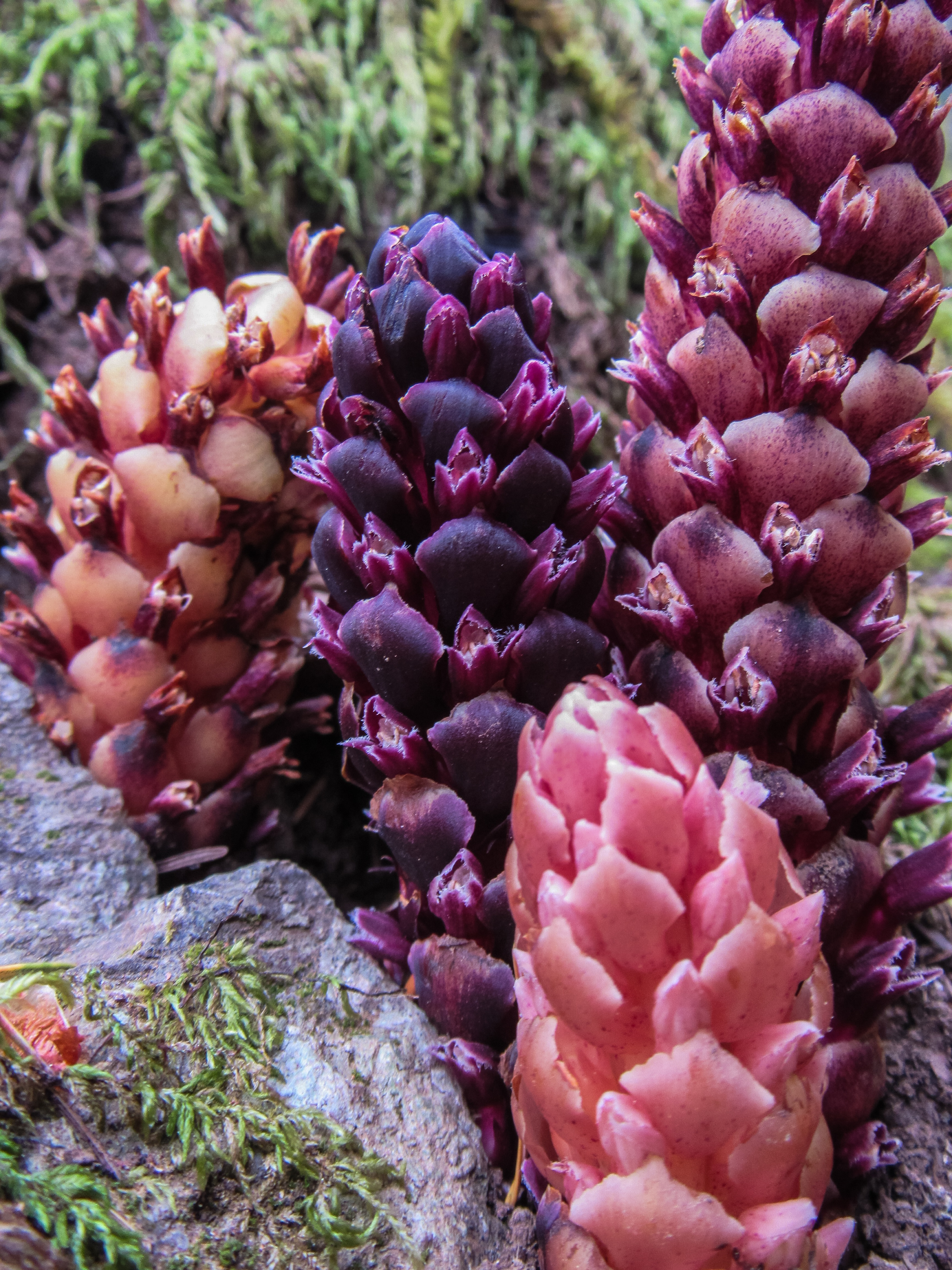

Scientific classification
- Kingdom: Plantae
- Clade: Tracheophytes
- Clade: Angiosperms
- Clade: Eudicots
- Clade: Asterids
- Order: Lamiales
- Family: Orobanchaceae
- Genus: Kopsiopsis
- Species: K. hookeri

Binomial name
- Kopsiopsis hookeri (Walp.) Govaerts

= Kopsiopsis hookeri =

Vancouver groundcone

Species of flowering plant

Kopsiopsis hookeri is a species of parasitic plant in the family Orobanchaceae known as Vancouver groundcone, small groundcone or poque.

== Distribution ==
It is native to western North America from British Columbia to northern California, where it grows in wooded areas.

== Description ==
It is a parasite of salal bushes, which it parasitizes by penetrating them with haustoria to tap nutrients. The groundcone is visible aboveground as a purplish, brown, or yellowish cone-shaped inflorescence 3 to 6 cm (1.2 to 2.4 in) long. Pale-colored flowers emerge from between the overlapping bracts. Coastal aboriginal groups ate the potato-like stembase of Ground Cones raw, though usually as a snack and not in any quantity.

Formerly considered Boschniakia hookeri, some taxonomists now place it in the genus Kopsiopsis on the basis of phylogenetic evidence.

Morphological evidence indicates that this species may have exchanged genetics with Kopsiopsis strobilacea in areas where their distribution overlaps.
