= Sharptor =

Hamlet in east Cornwall, England

Coordinates: 50°31′57″N 4°27′28″W

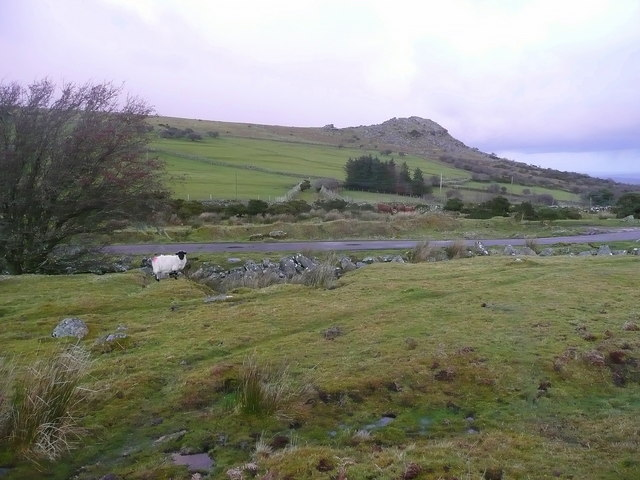
- Pasture at the top of Sharptor looking north from access land towards the prominent "nose" of Sharp Tor

- Location within Cornwall
- Population: 24
- OS grid reference: SX 25997 73186
  - London: 200 km (120 mi)
- Civil parish: Linkinhorne
- Unitary authority: Cornwall
- Shire county: Cornwall
- Region: South West
- Country: England
- Sovereign state: United Kingdom
- Post town: LISKEARD
- Postcode district: PL14
- Police: Devon and Cornwall
- Fire: Cornwall
- Ambulance: South Western

Sharptor is a hamlet west of Henwood in the civil parish of Linkinhorne in east Cornwall, England, United Kingdom. It is named after Sharp Tor on Bodmin Moor. Sharptor is close to Minions to the south, Kingbeare in the north and Darleyford to the east. Sharptor is around 280 metres (920 ft) above sea level.

Caradon Hill, standing at 371 metres (1,217 ft) high, on which there is a TV transmission mast on the summit is visible from Sharptor looking south. Kit Hill standing at 334 metres (1,096 ft), which is topped with the stack of South Kit Hill mine, is visible due east from Sharptor. On a clear day, east and just to the right of Kill Hill, Dartmoor can be seen.

== History ==
Before Sharptor, there was a lot of human activity in the area including a prehistoric hillfort and field systems on Stowe's Hill and Neolithic cairns, field systems and enclosures on Sharp Tor.

There are several mine works and quarries close to Sharptor. Most of the properties in Sharptor were for workers, and most are orientated to face east so as to wake the occupants as the sun rose in the morning.. According to the 1871 census, there were 21 residents in Sharptor, most of the men (around 43%) working in the quarries and the remainder (35%) working in mining. It is interesting that Sharptor seemed to be a male enclave with only 4 women residents. The average age was around 36.

Many of the houses are constructed from moorstone, a form of Cornish granite. The stone was formed into shape using a plug and feather method hence it is common to see the remnants of the hole drilled to split the rock (see image of fireplace below).

At the top of the Sharptor road are the remains of the Liskeard and Caradon Railway which opened in 1844 and closed in 1917. The track materials were removed to aid the war effort, but many of the stone sleepers remain. The railway can be easily walked to Minions.

Sharp Tor or West Sharptor Mine was held under a lease for 21 years, from 1849, granted by the Duke of Cornwall, who owns most of the mineral rights around Sharptor. The mine was first opened in 1850 and was worked for copper. The original company had 256 shares, with £62 paid for each, representing a capital of £15,872; the amount expended to 1855 was about £15,000. The mine was worked using a 60-horsepower steam engine installed by Willam West in 1850. The mine lies within the Phoenix United Mine district. Ore was shipped to Looe.

Although the primary mineral was copper, there are other minerals that can be found in the mine tailings such as brochantite, cassiterite, chalcocite, chalcopyrite, chamosite, connellite, langite, pyrite, quartz, copper(I) oxide (known locally as tile ore) and orthochamosite (daphnite).

As the railway was built so the Cheesewring Quarry was developed. The fine silver Granite was in demand for engineering and architectural work. As the tin was sent to Looe, so was the granite where it was shipped to London and further afield. Nineteenth century structures built from the granite included Devonport Dockyard, as well as the docks at Birkenhead and Copenhagen. Other structures include the breakwaters at Alderney and Dover, the Spithead forts, Thames Embankment, Westminster Bridge, Tower Bridge and a lighthouse in Sri Lanka (then known as Ceylon). The quarry, for most of its history, was owned and worked by John Freeman and Sons, who had over 80 quarries in Cornwall. At its peak, there were over 100 men and boys working at the quarry. But after World War I, the decline in demand and also difficulty in extracting fine granite from under the Cheesewring (now an attraction) meant the quarry went into decline.

Several of the houses in Sharptor and Henwood were extended, and one issue was the use of Mundic block (blocks made from mine waste) for construction between 1900 and 1960.

In 1944, an American transport plane hit Sharp Tor and several fragments of the plane were found and removed.

The maps highlight the location of Sharptor Mine in 1877 and 1907. Most of the buildings that were mapped in both years remain until today. The mine chimney has been removed but some of the structures remain and it is believed that one property was previously used as an engine house. Although the mine has been open for years, most of the engine house has now fallen into the shaft.

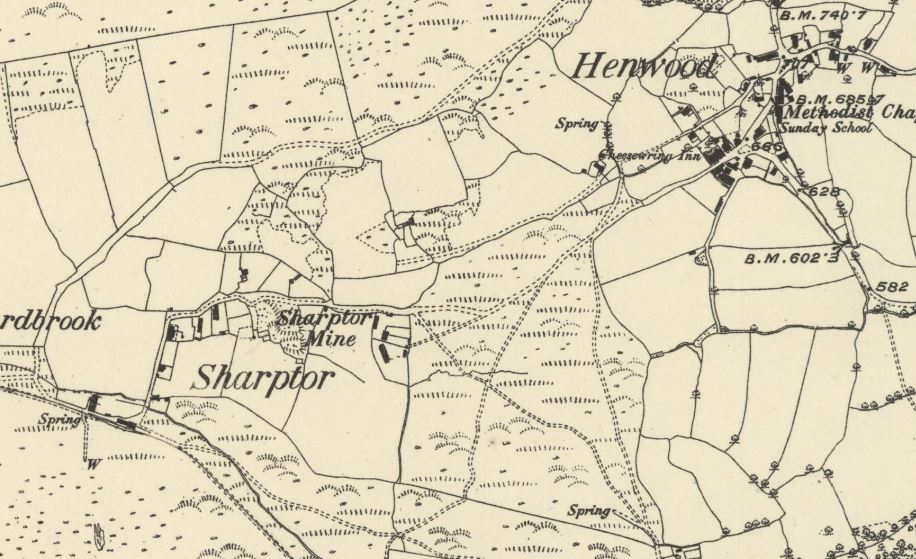
Map of Sharptor in 1877

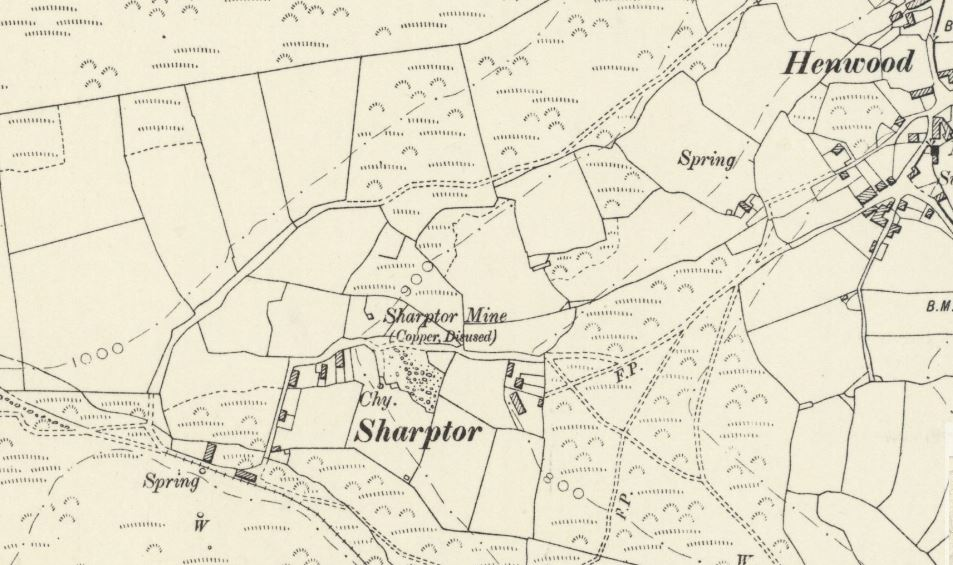
Map of Sharptor in 1907

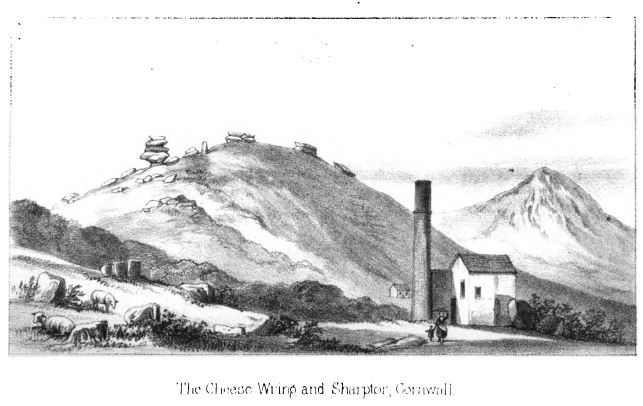
An artist's representation of the Cheesewring and Sharptor in 1856

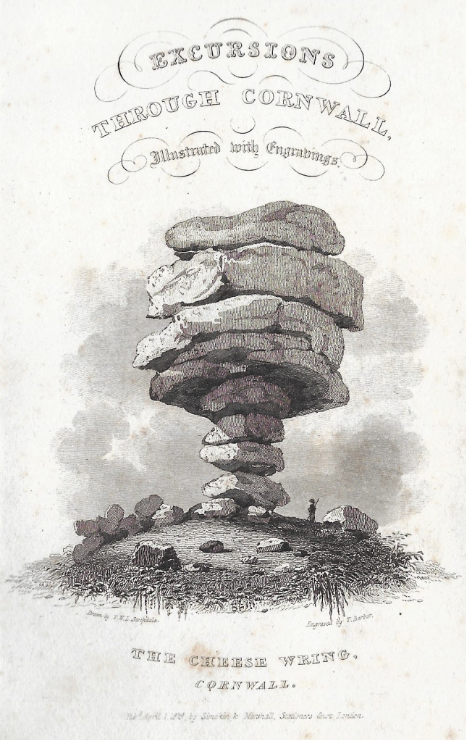
Poster (engraving) advertising excursions to Cornwall featuring the Cheesewring (slightly exaggerated), circa 1823/24

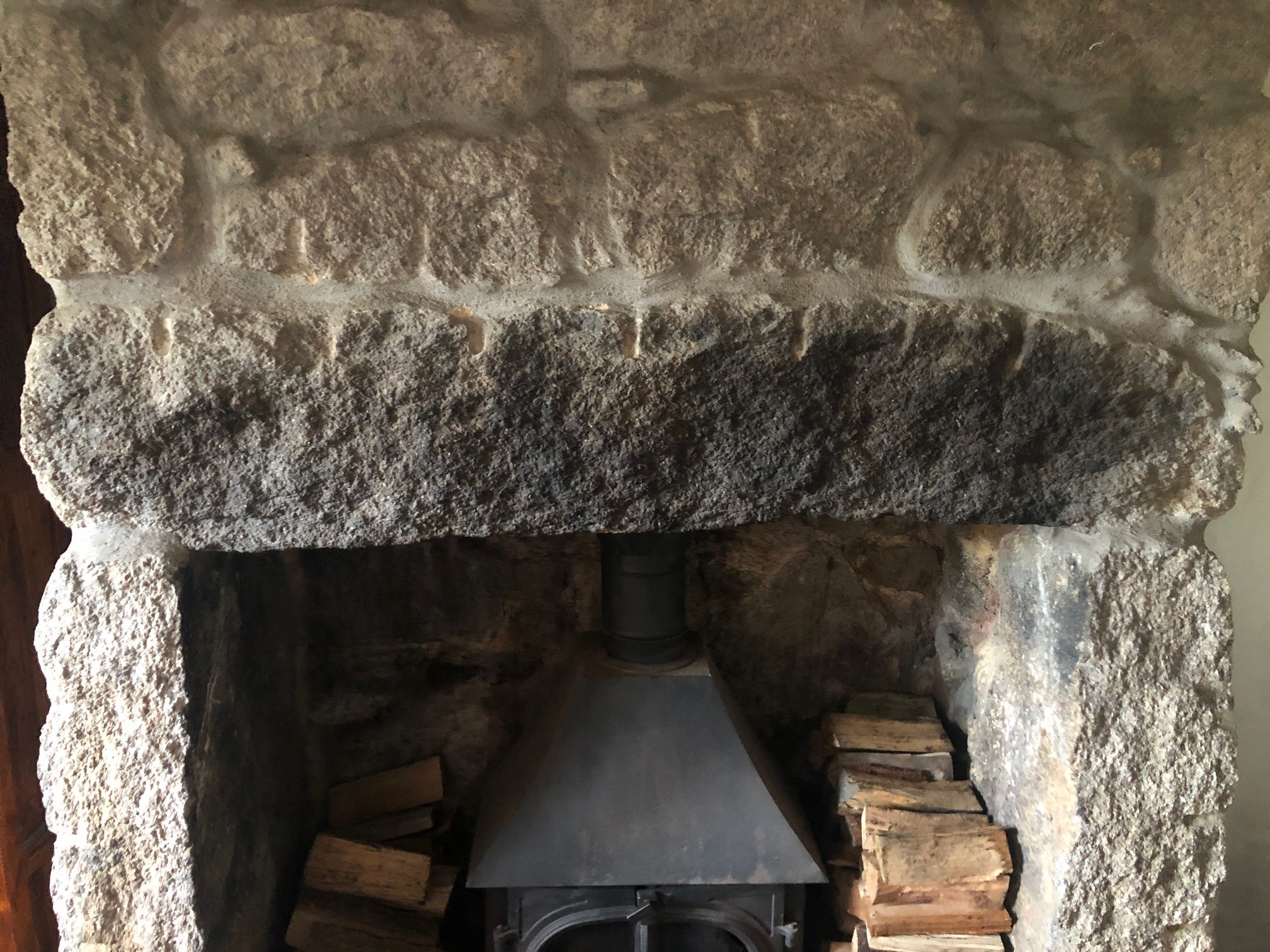
Moorstone fireplace in a house at Sharptor showing remnants of plug and feather method to split the rock

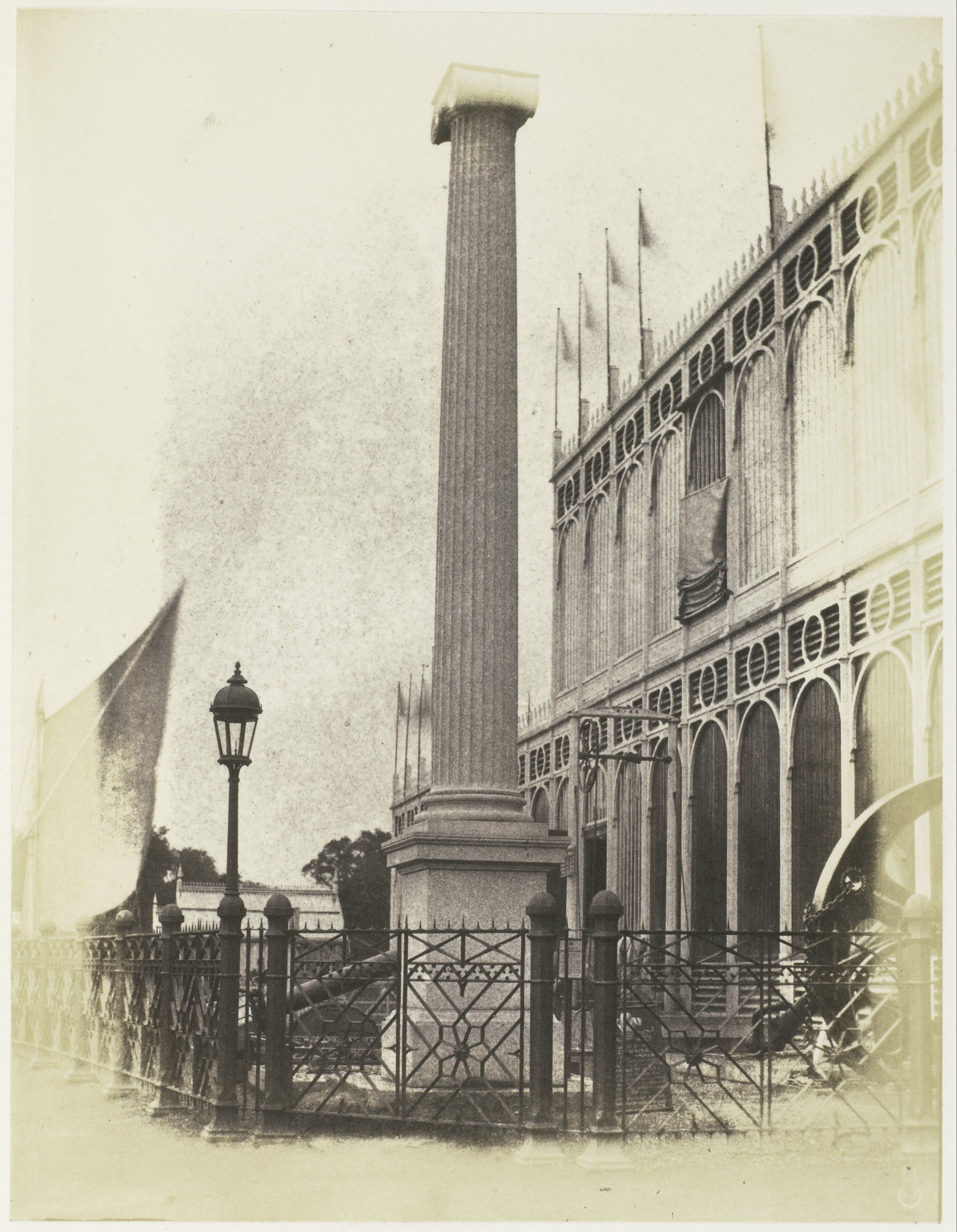
Column of Cornish granite at the 1851 Great Exhibition of the Works of Industry of All Nations in London in front of the Crystal Palace - Cheesewring Company

== Tourism ==
There have been some visitors over the years who have been struck by Sharp Tor and the views:

Thomas Bond, 1823—Sharpy-torry (Sharp-torr from its conical shape), the views brought to my mind the beautiful lines in Ovid:
Tum freta diffundi rapidisque tumescere ventis
Jussit, et ambitæ circumdare littora terræ.
Addidit et fontes, immensaque stagna lacusque.
Jussit et extendi campos, subsidere valles,
Fronde tegi silvas, lapidosos surgere montes.
Then he ordered the seas to be poured abroad, and to swell with furious winds, and to draw a shore quite round the inclosed earth. He Likewise added springs, and immense pools and lakes. He ordered likewise plains to be extended, and valleys to sink; the woods to be covered with green leaves, and the rocky mountains to rise.

Cyrus Redding, 1842—Sharp Point Tor is directly south of Kilmarth, is equal to it in height, and on the south-east side has a curious assemblage of rocks.

John Allen, 1856—Sharptor, a fine, pointed, granite hill.

E. T. Crabb, 1876—Sharp Tor or Sharp Point Tor is a conical hill of granite boulders, whose vertex is 1200 feet above the sea. The panoramic scenery from its top is grand and interesting.

E.C. Axford, 1975—The conical Sharp Tor overhangs it as Mount Sinai overhung the village of Morality in The Pilgrim's Progress.

E V. Thompson,1975—Sharptor: from here one has a breathtaking view of the whole East Cornwall.

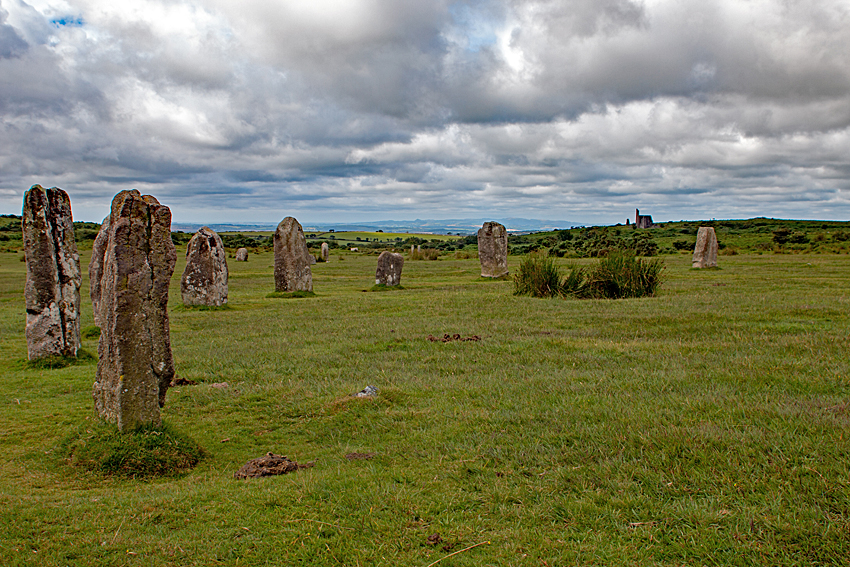
Hurlers Stones, Minions

There are number of attractions nearby including the Cheesewring, a number of granite stones on Stowe's Hill; the Darley Oak, an ancient tree thought to be 1,000 years old; The Hurlers, a group of three ancient stone circles; Gold Diggings Quarry, a popular spot for swimming; Daniel Gumb's cave, the home to a stonecutter and his family;.

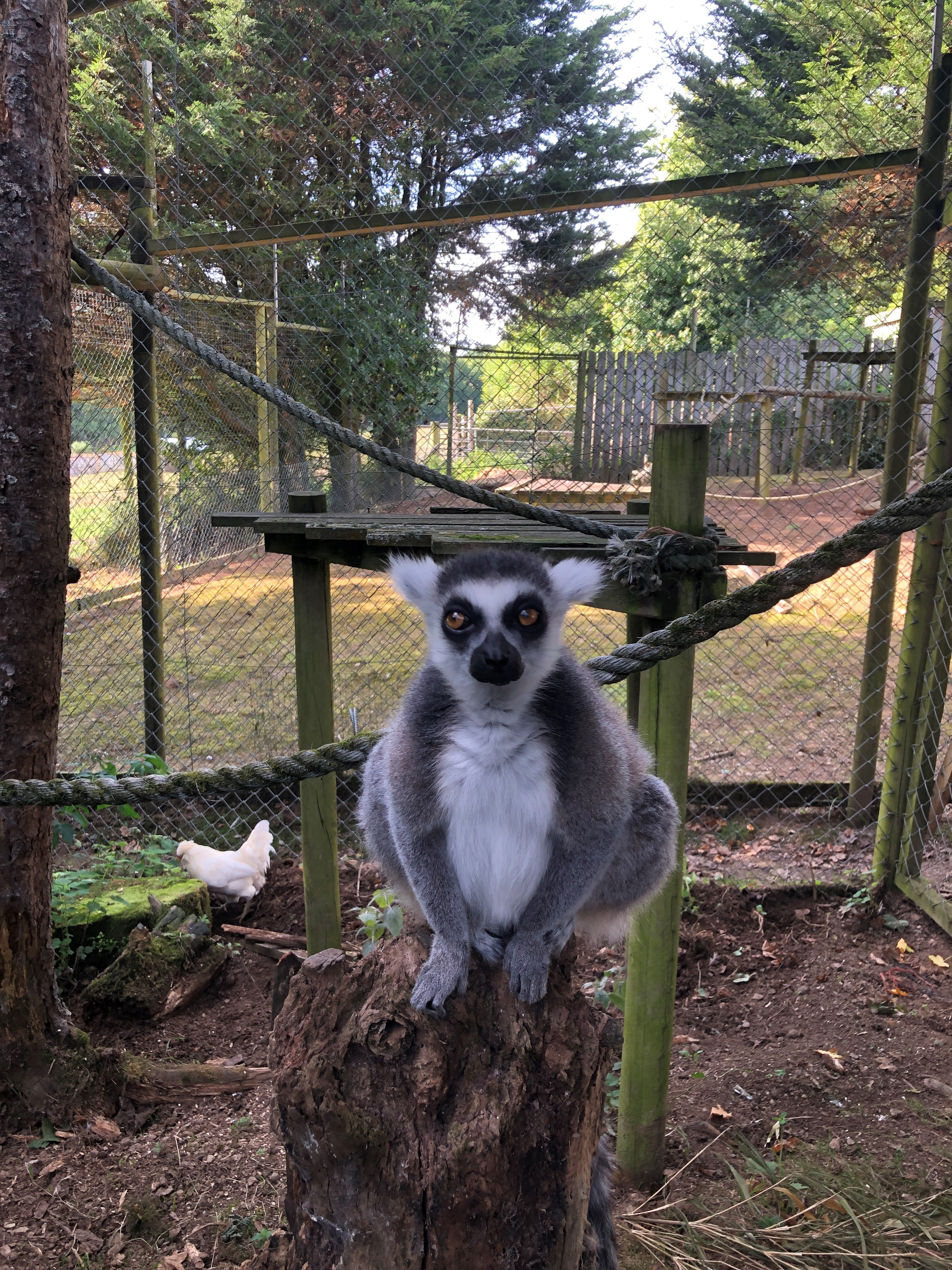
Lemur at Porfell Wildlife Park

Also, nearby is Siblyback Lake a reservoir with a 3.2-mile (5.1 km) walk, various water sports and fishing (Rainbow trout and Blue trout); Golitha Falls a natural waterfall walk on the River Fowey; King Doniert's Stone, two pieces of decorated 9th-century cross believed to commemorate Dungarth, King of Cornwall and the nearby Rillaton Barrow, an ancient burial mound.

Carnglaze Caverns is close by and consists of three man-made caverns formed as part of a slate quarry in the Loveny Valley, near the village of St Neot. The caverns were used to store rum and also explosives produced at Trago Mills but is now a tourist attraction and music auditorium.

Porfell Wildlife Park and Sanctuary is between Sharptor and Looe. Porfell offers sanctuary to many different animals from around the world and allows visitors to get up close to lemurs, meerkats, monkeys, and other exotic animals.

== Climate ==
=== Weather ===
Sharptor has an Oceanic climate according to the Köppen climate classification but, like the rest of Bodmin Moor, due to its high altitude, it is often cooler, windier and wetter than further down the valley off the moor. However, there is a good balance of fair days too, which can get warm in the summer. In winter, frosts are common and even though it snows most years, it is never prolonged or severe. However, in previous years, residents have been snowed in.

Climate data for Sharptor
Month	Jan	Feb	Mar	Apr	May	Jun	Jul	Aug	Sep	Oct	Nov	Dec	Year
Mean daily maximum °C (°F)	8 (46)	8 (46)	10 (50)	12 (54)	14 (57)	17 (63)	19 (66)	18 (64)	17 (63)	14 (57)	11 (52)	9 (48)	19 (66)
Mean daily minimum °C (°F)	4 (39)	4 (39)	4 (39)	5 (41)	8 (46)	10 (50)	13 (55)	13 (55)	11 (52)	9 (48)	6 (43)	4 (39)	4 (39)
Average snowfall cm (inches)	5.4 (2.1)	2.3 (0.9)	0.8 (0.3)	0.2 (0.1)	0 (0)	0 (0)	0 (0)	0 (0)	0 (0)	0 (0)	0 (0)	2.6 (1.0)	11.3 (4.4)
Average rainy days	11	10	8	6	7	7	6	7	6	9	10	11	98
Average snowy days	2	1	2	1	0	0	0	0	0	0	0	0	6
Source: World Weather Online

=== Weather phenomena ===
Being on Bodmin Moor, often there is a mist but when clear, Dartmoor can be seen in the distance. Also, some weather phenomena can be seen such as 22° haloes and "white of morning" a local reference to when the morning mist cloaks lower elevations down from Sharptor in the River Lynher valley. Often this is referred to as valley fog where fog is trapped in the bowl of a valley.

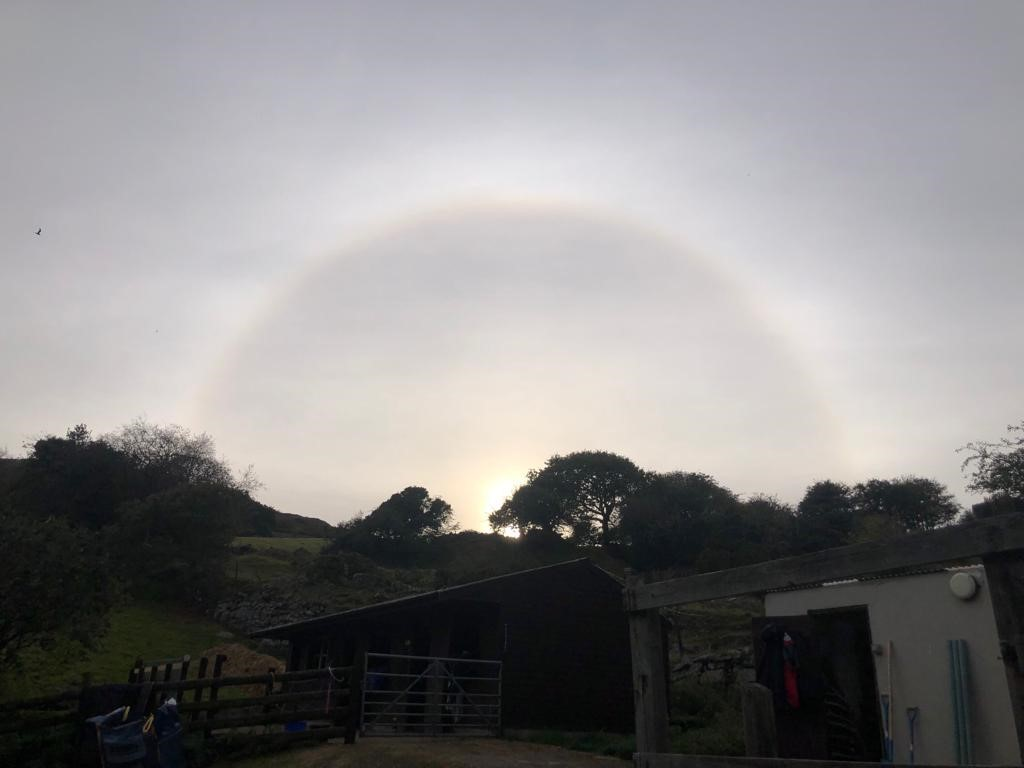
22° halo seen from Sharptor

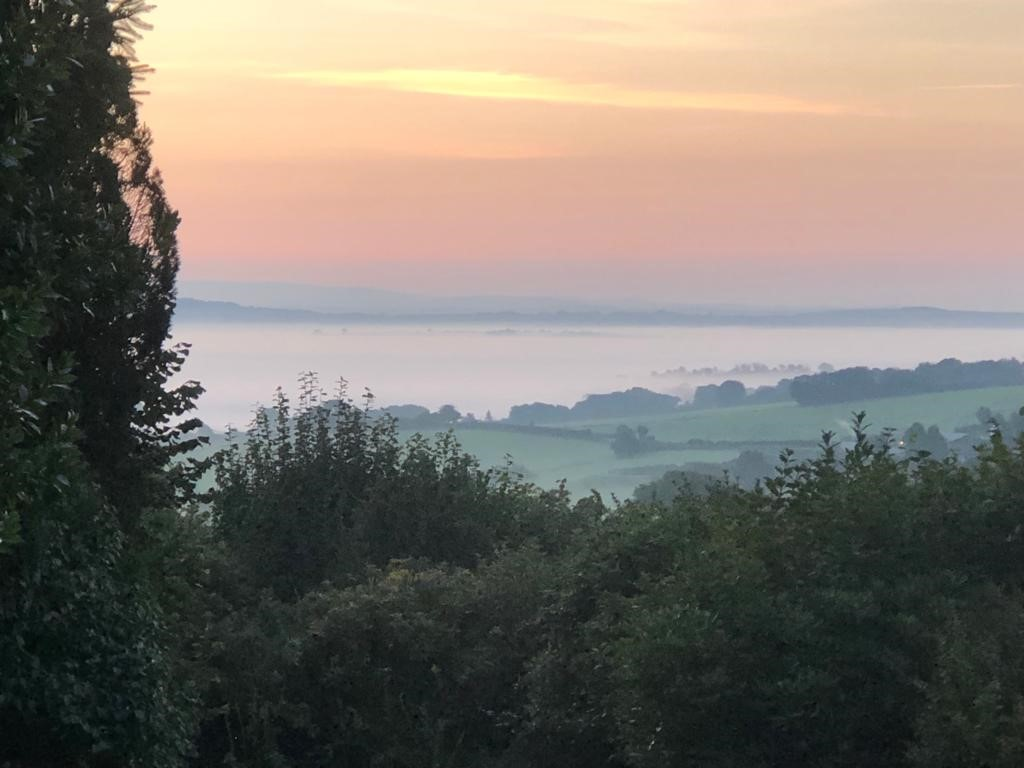
Local term, white of morning, mist cloaking the River Lynher seen from Sharptor

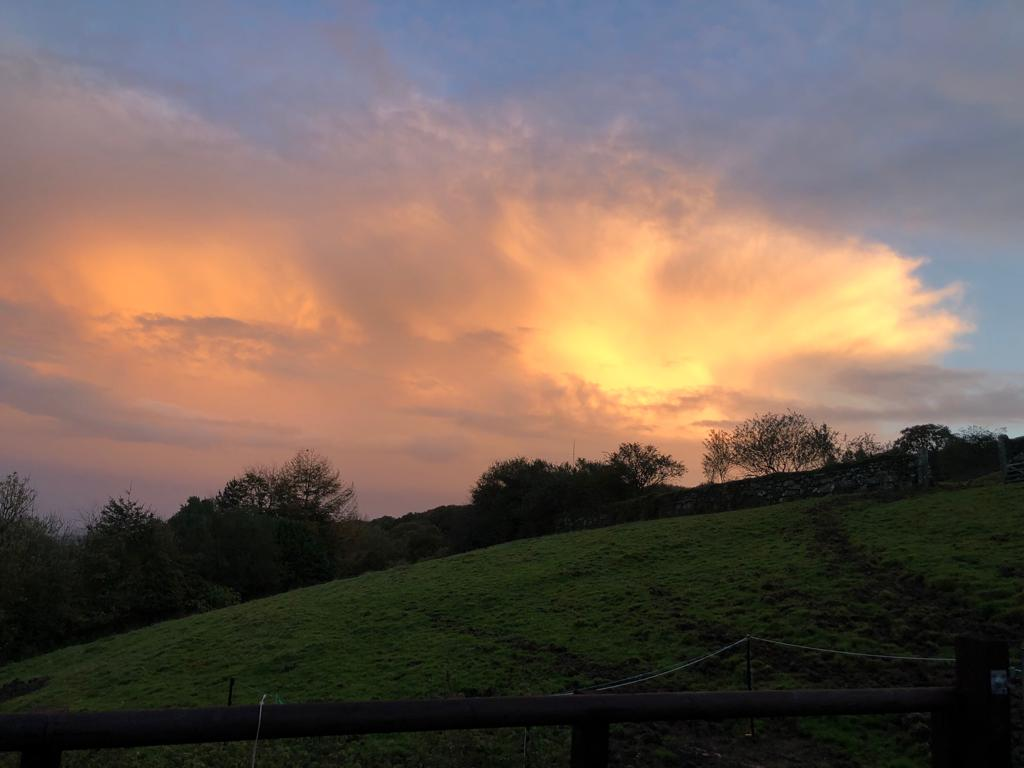
Big cloud formation from Sharptor

== Flora and fauna ==
=== Flora ===
Native trees around Sharptor include hawthorn, blackthorn/sloe, hazel, oak, rowan and elderberry. Many of the trees that are protected from the wind have lichen growing from the branches. There are also a large number of conifers, rhododendrons and many buddleja that have been planted or self-seeded.

There is also a proliferation of gorse and bracken. As bracken is a highly invasive species, residents can often be seen stomping fields to break the stems to prevent growth. As parts of Sharptor are within a Site of Special Scientific Interest (SSSI) it is important to control bracken to protect existing flora and fauna.

Smaller plants that are found in the walls and hedgerows include lesser celandine, common dog-violet, navelwort, foxglove and wild garlic

There is also an abundance of fungi including Bolete and Tricholomopsis.

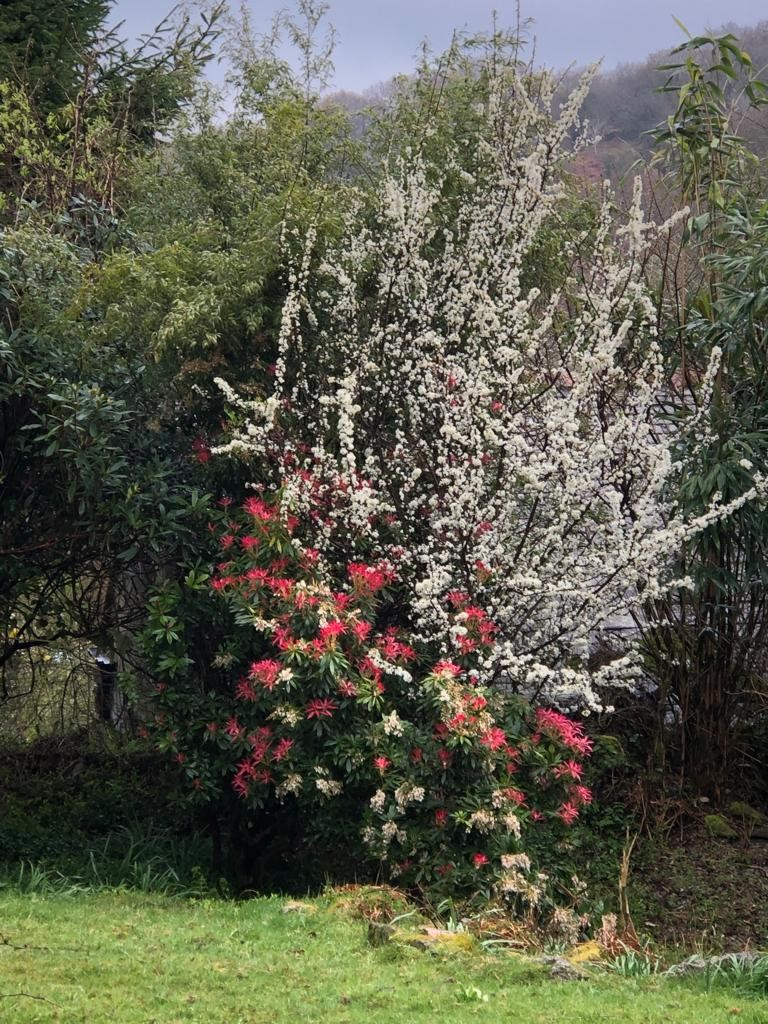
Small blackthorn in bloom in a garden in Sharptor

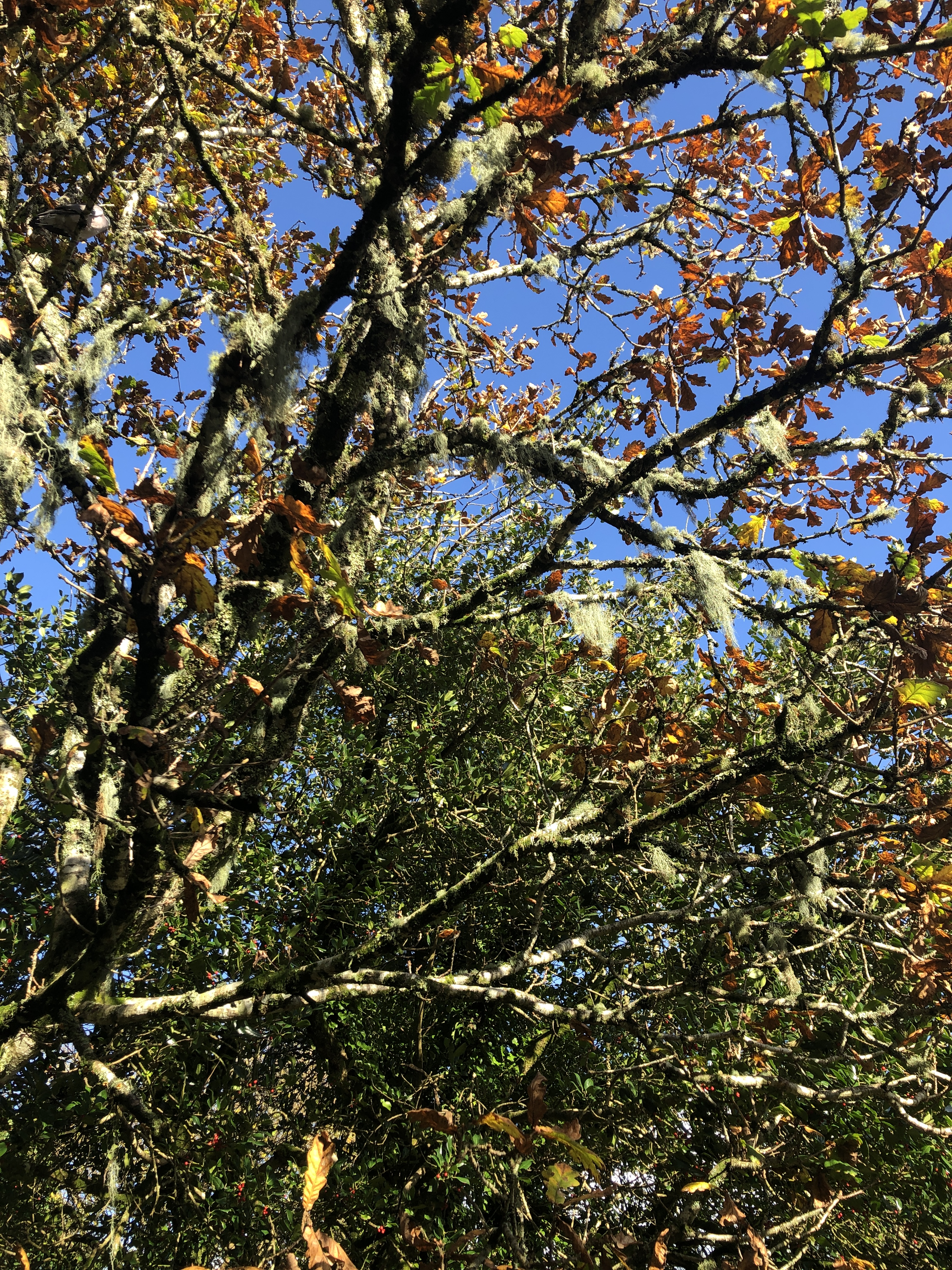
An oak tree with lichen growing on the branches at Sharptor

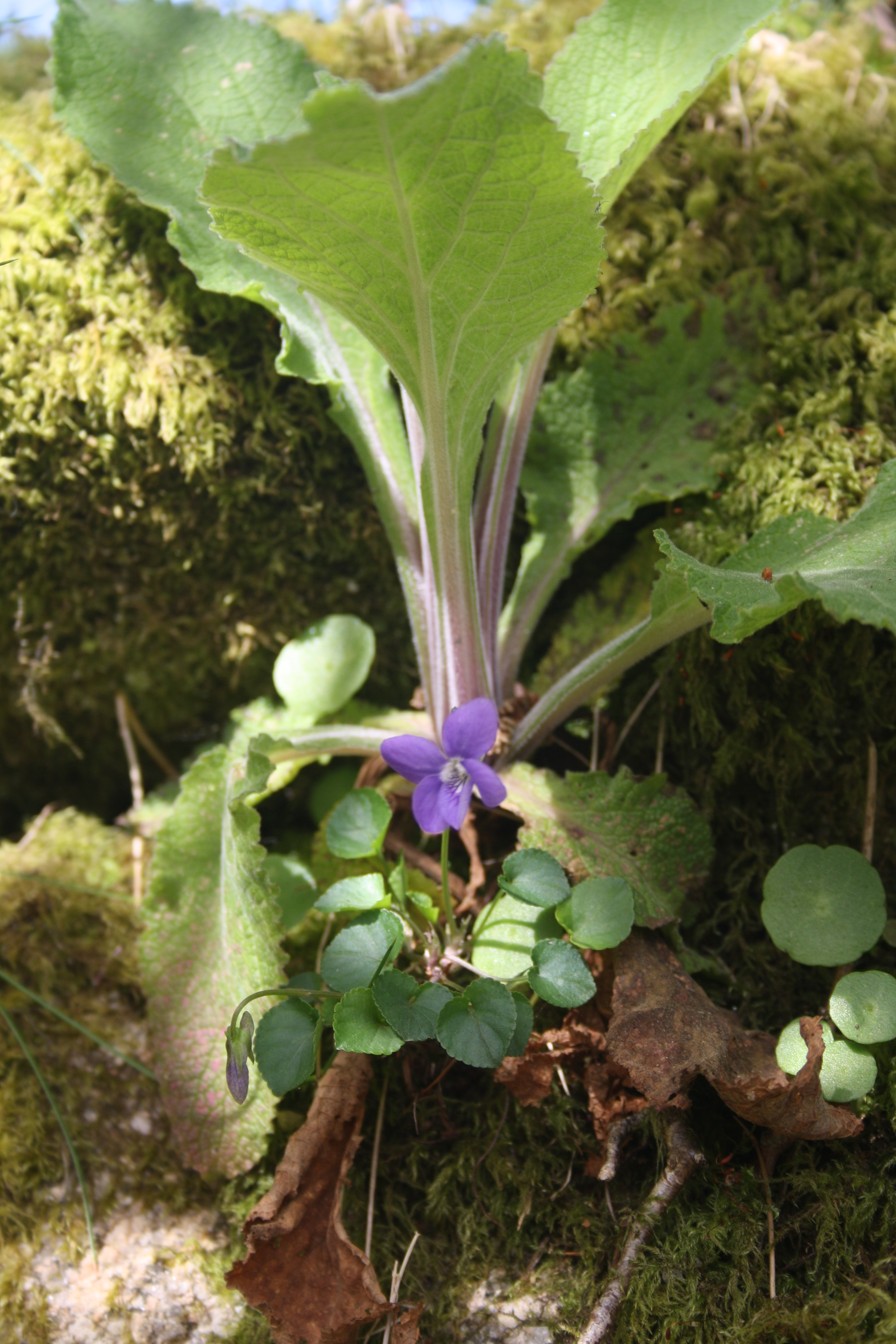
Common dog-violet and Foxglove on a wall at Sharptor

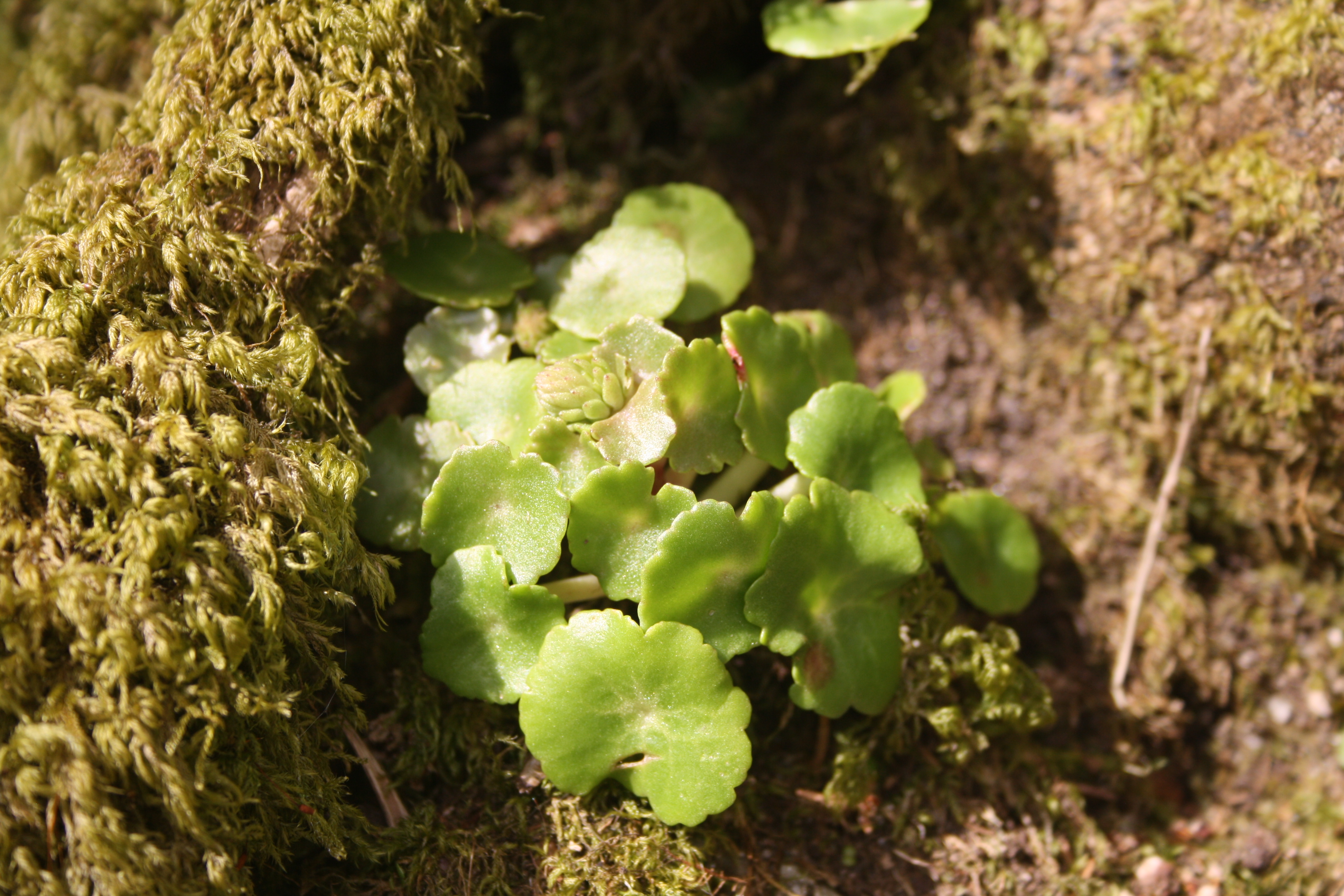
Navelwort on a wall in Sharptor

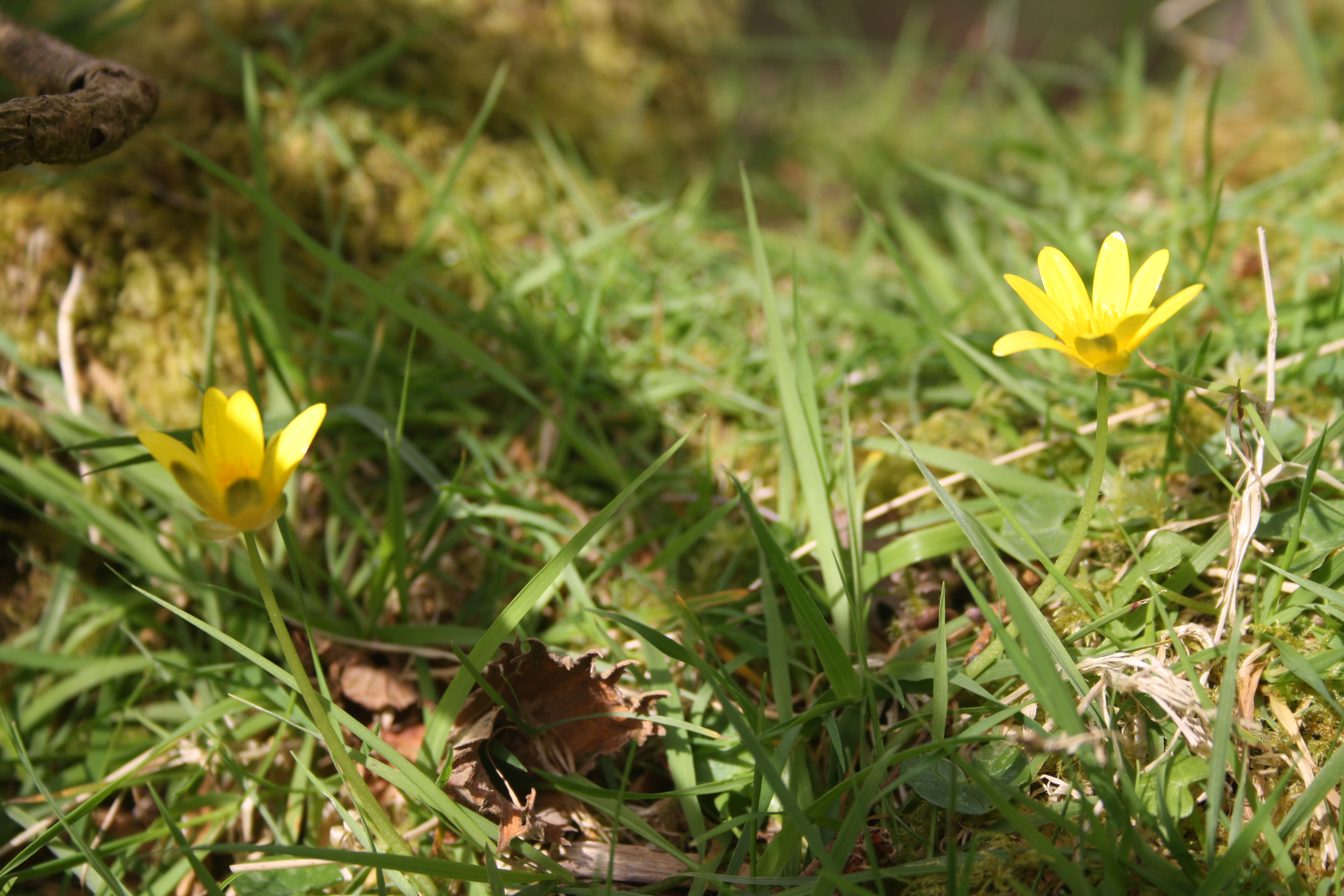
Lesser celandine on a wall at Sharptor

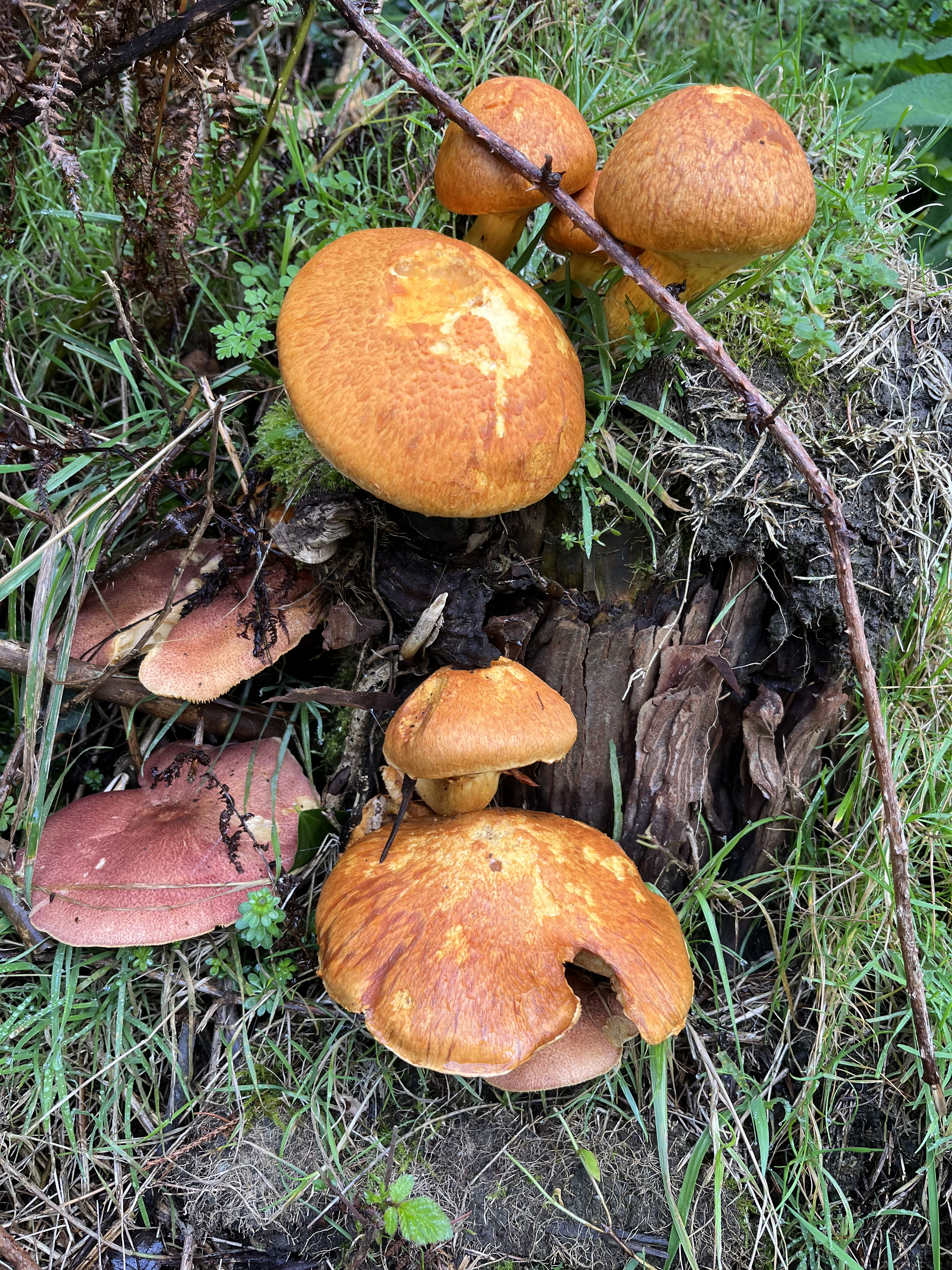
Fungi (Bolete and Tricholomopsis) growing out of old tree stump in a garden at Sharptor

=== Fauna ===
Fauna seen commonly around Sharptor are red fox, several corvidae such as raven, magpie, and jay. Smaller birds that are common include Wagtail, European robin, wren, treecreeper, European stonechat, European golden plover, common cuckoo, common skylark, meadow pipit, wheatear, redwing, mistle thrush and woodpecker. Birds of prey include barn owl, red kite, common buzzard and kestrel. Recently (2023), a nightingale has been heard singing at Sharptor but no sightings have been reported.

Bats are also prevalent at dusk due to several derelict buildings and mine adits. Common bats found around Sharptor include greater horseshoe, lesser horseshoe and brown long-eared.

Unlike Dartmoor, there is no specific breed of pony on Bodmin Moor. However, they do roam free and are rounded up in the autumn for sale, generally at auction. Like the ponies, there is no specific breed of sheep but there are some common breeds found on the moor. Popular breeds are Scottish Blackface and North Country Cheviot replacing more traditional breeds of Devon and Cornwall Longwool and Greyface Dartmoor. There are various sheep creeps around the Sharptor area to allow sheep to pass through the heavy Cornish hedge. There are also cattle on the moors around Sharptor with popular breeds being Highland, Galloway and Blue Grey. Ponies, sheep and cattle are often found in the fields and lanes around Sharptor.

During the summer there are many different types of insects including butterflies such as red admiral, cabbage white, comma, meadow brown, peacock, ringlet, silver-washed fritillary and small tortoiseshell.

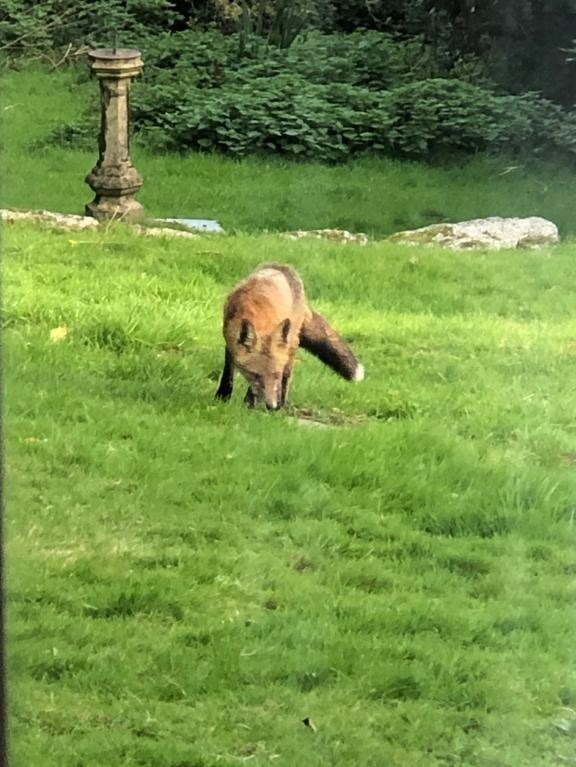
Red fox seen in the garden of a house at Sharptor

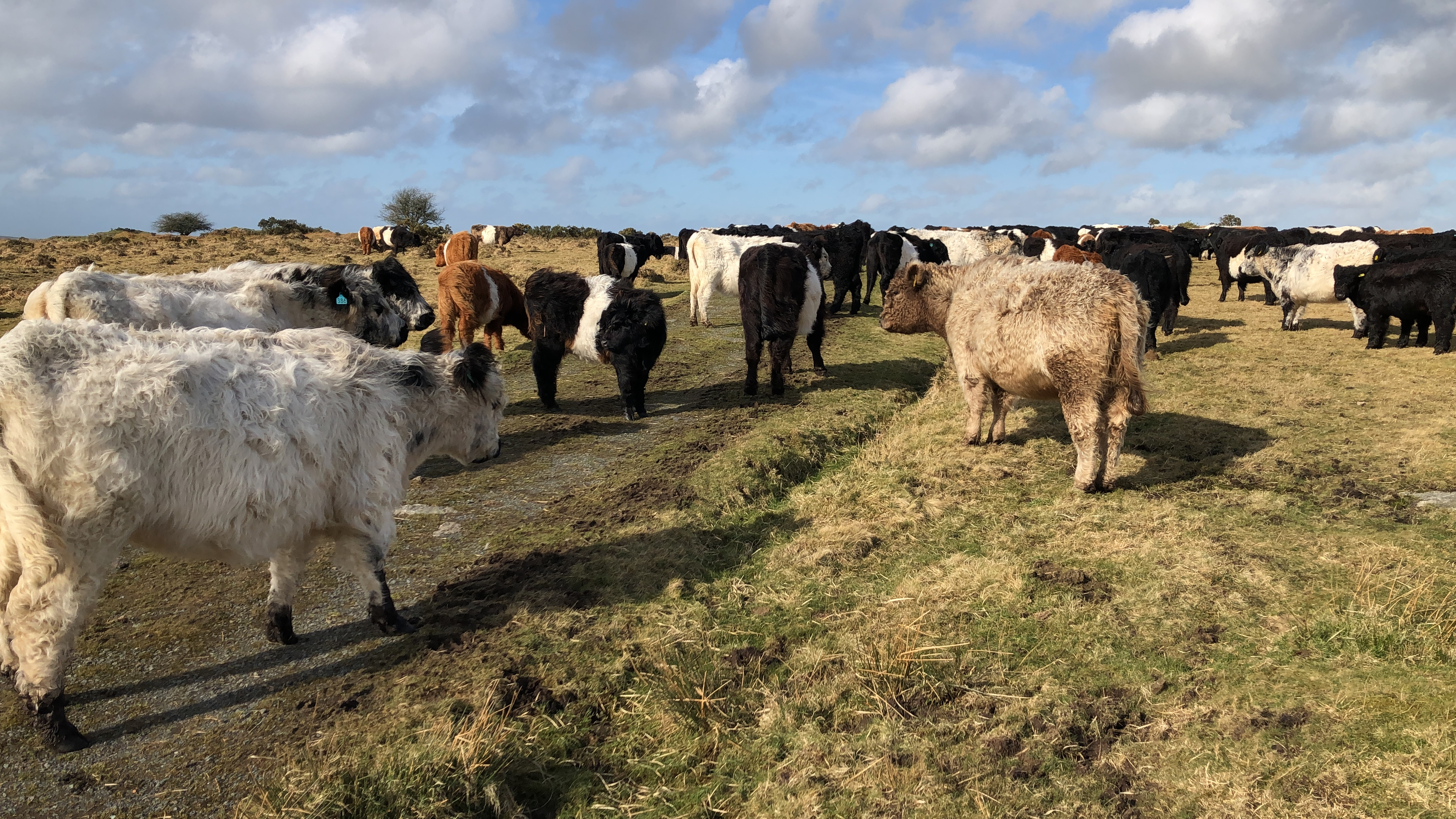
Cows on the moor above Sharptor

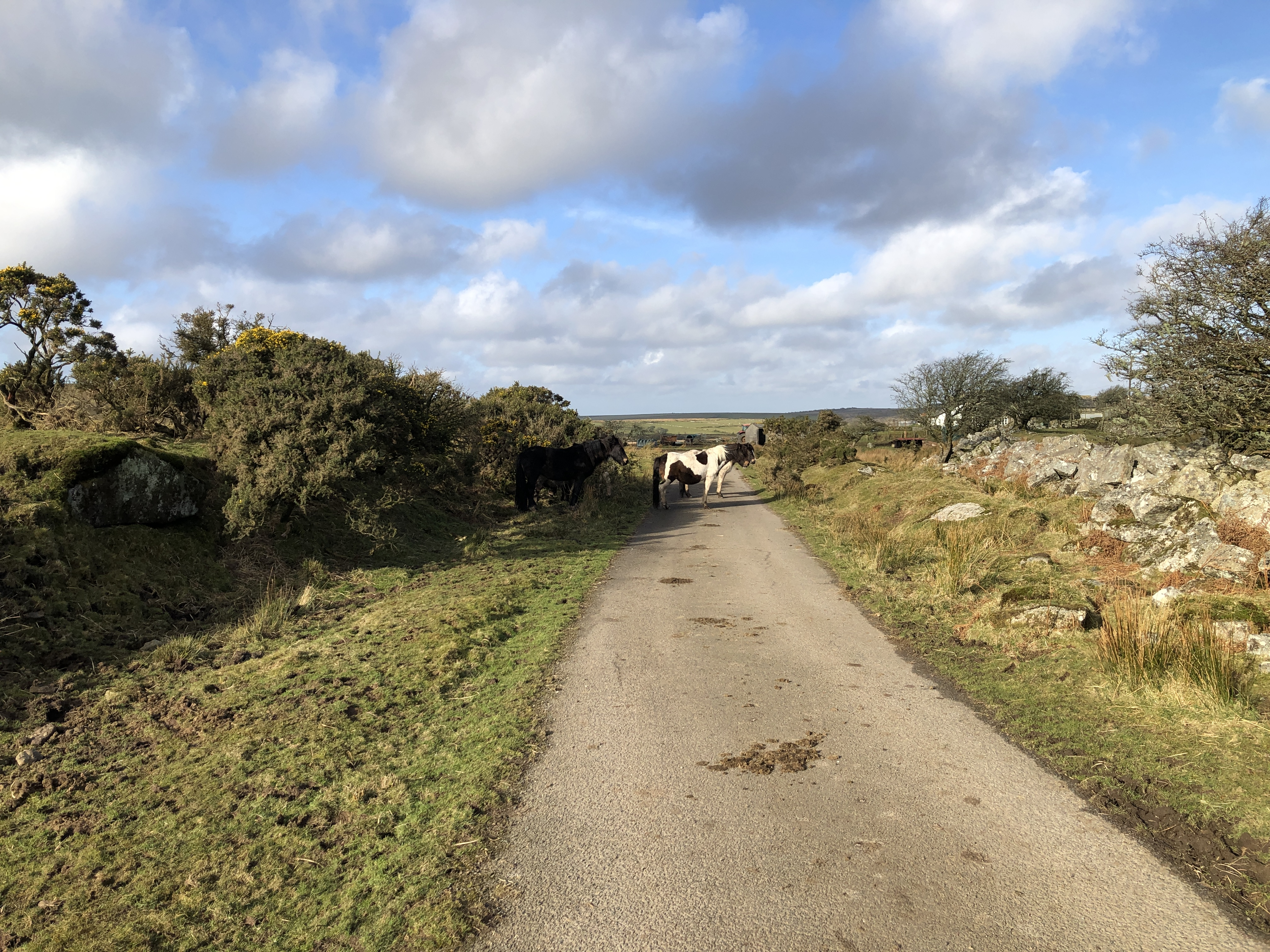
Horses at the top of the lane through Sharptor

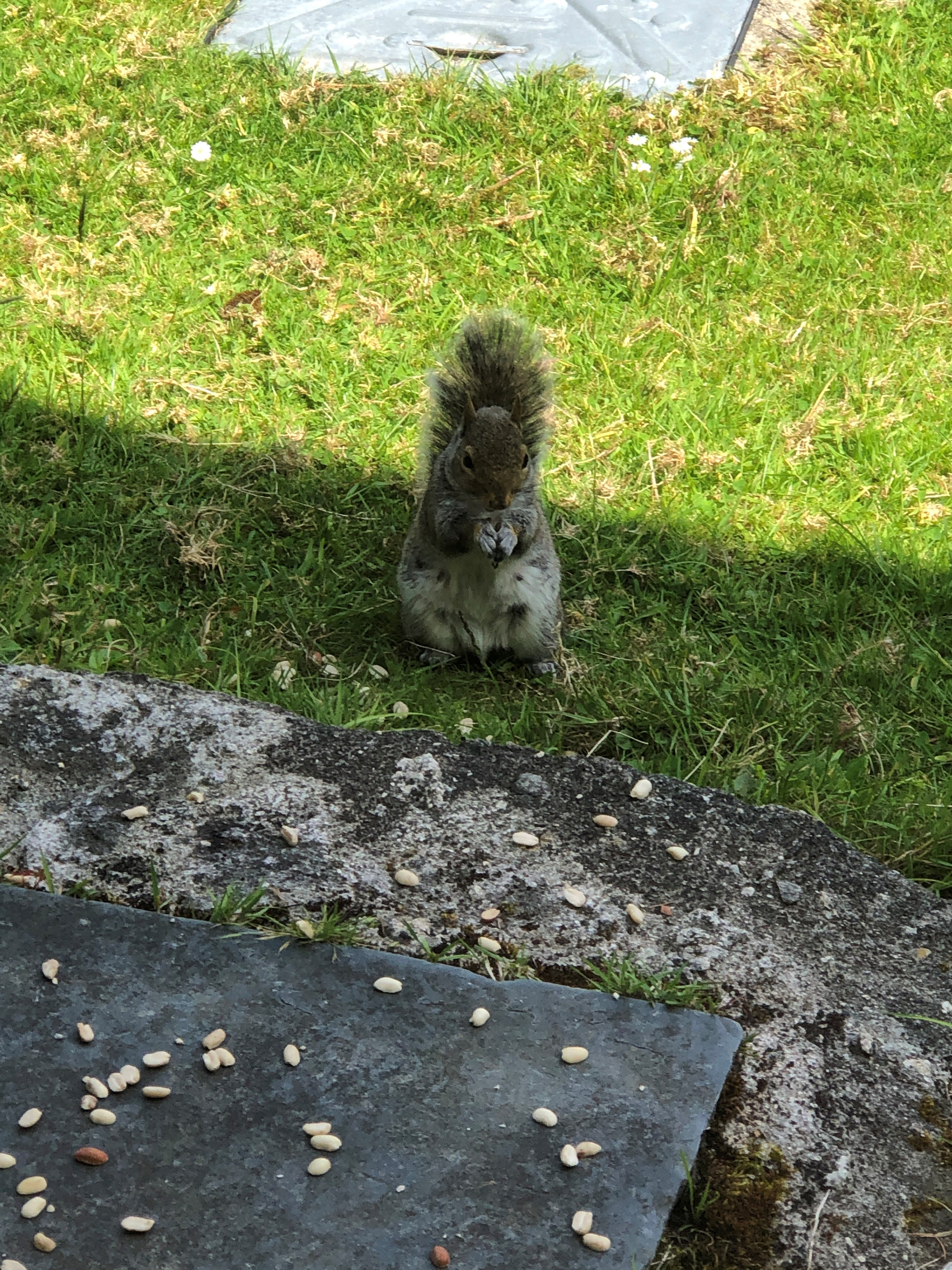
Grey squirrel in a garden at Sharptor

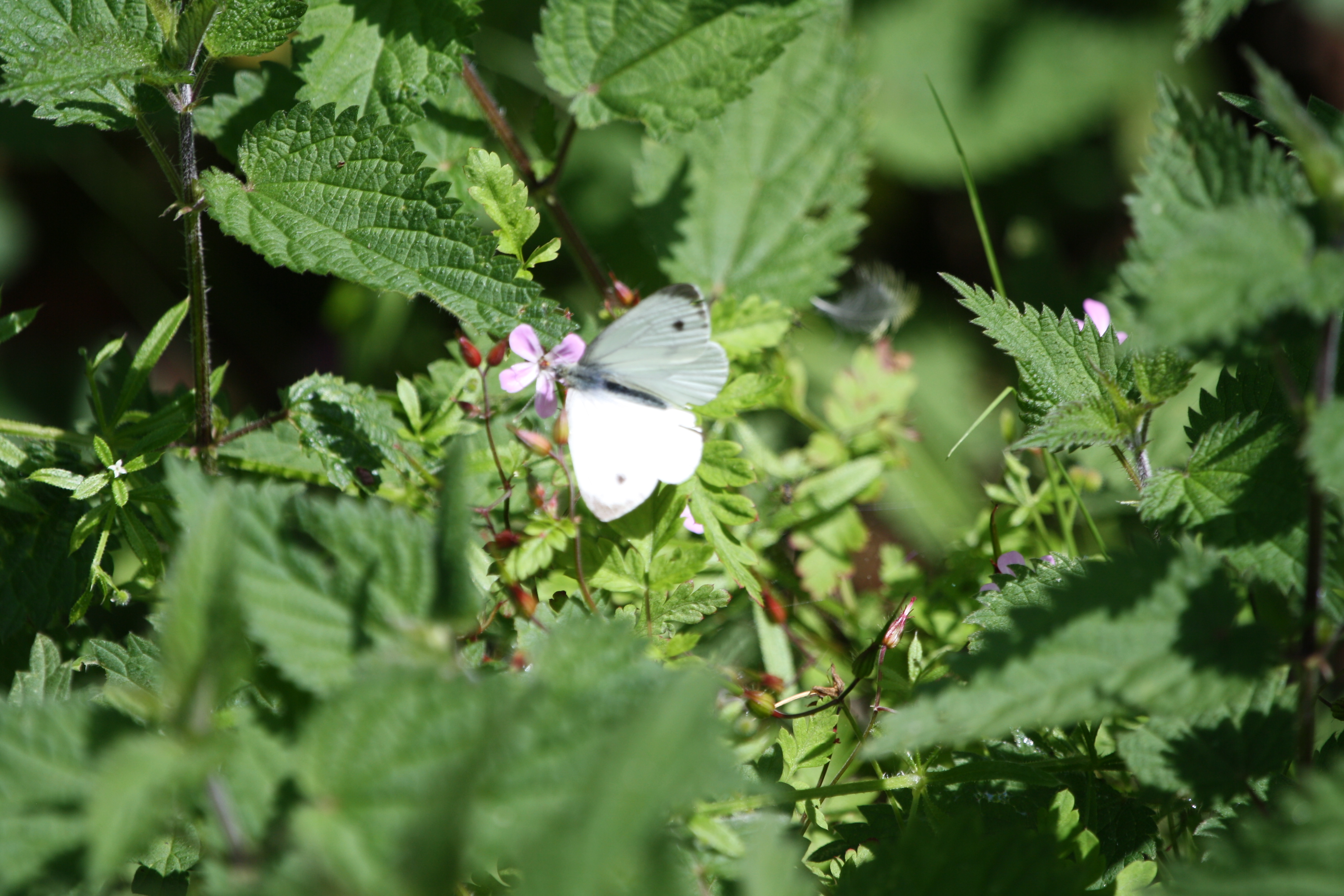
Cabbage white butterfly in a garden at Sharptor

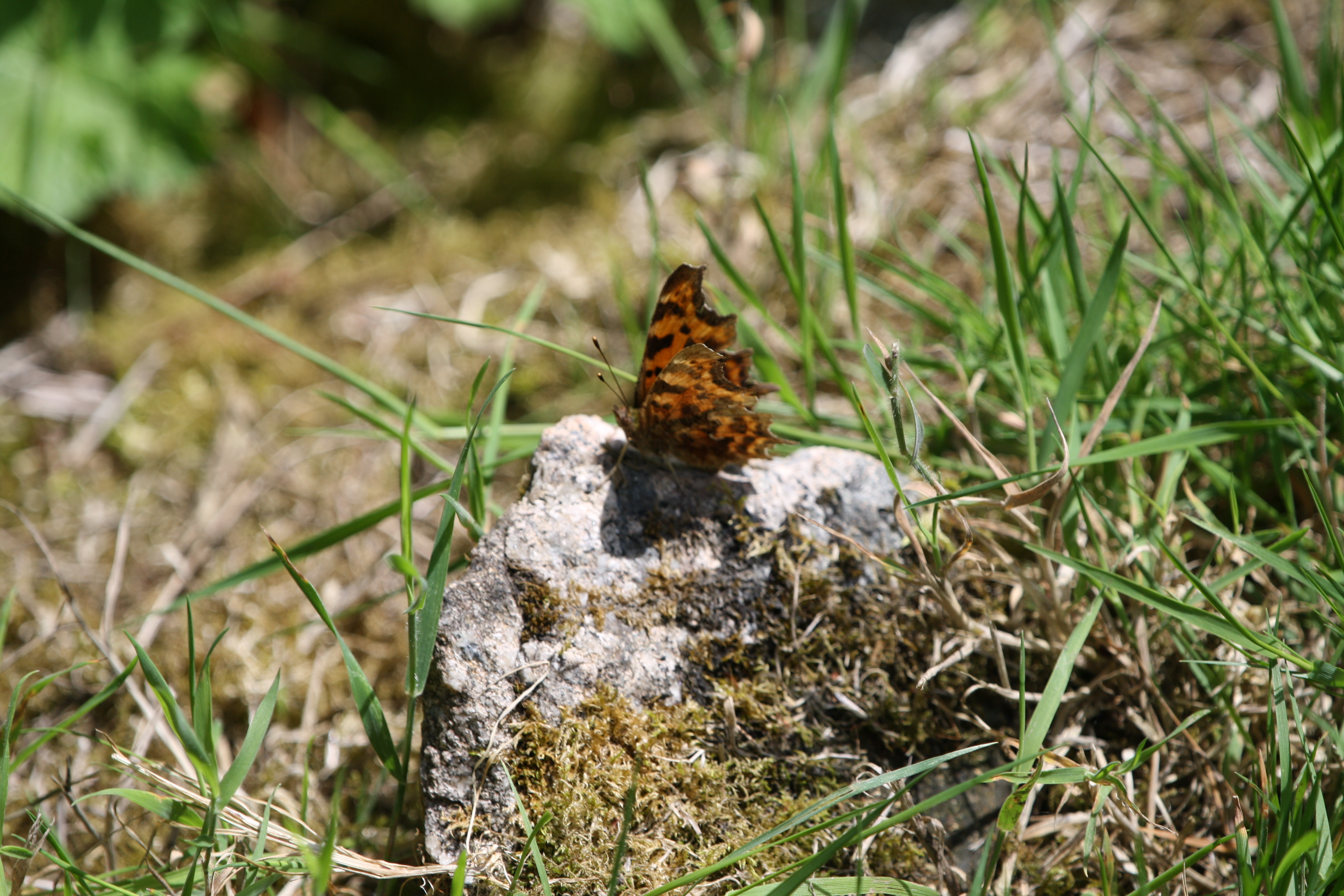
Comma butterfly in a garden at Sharptor

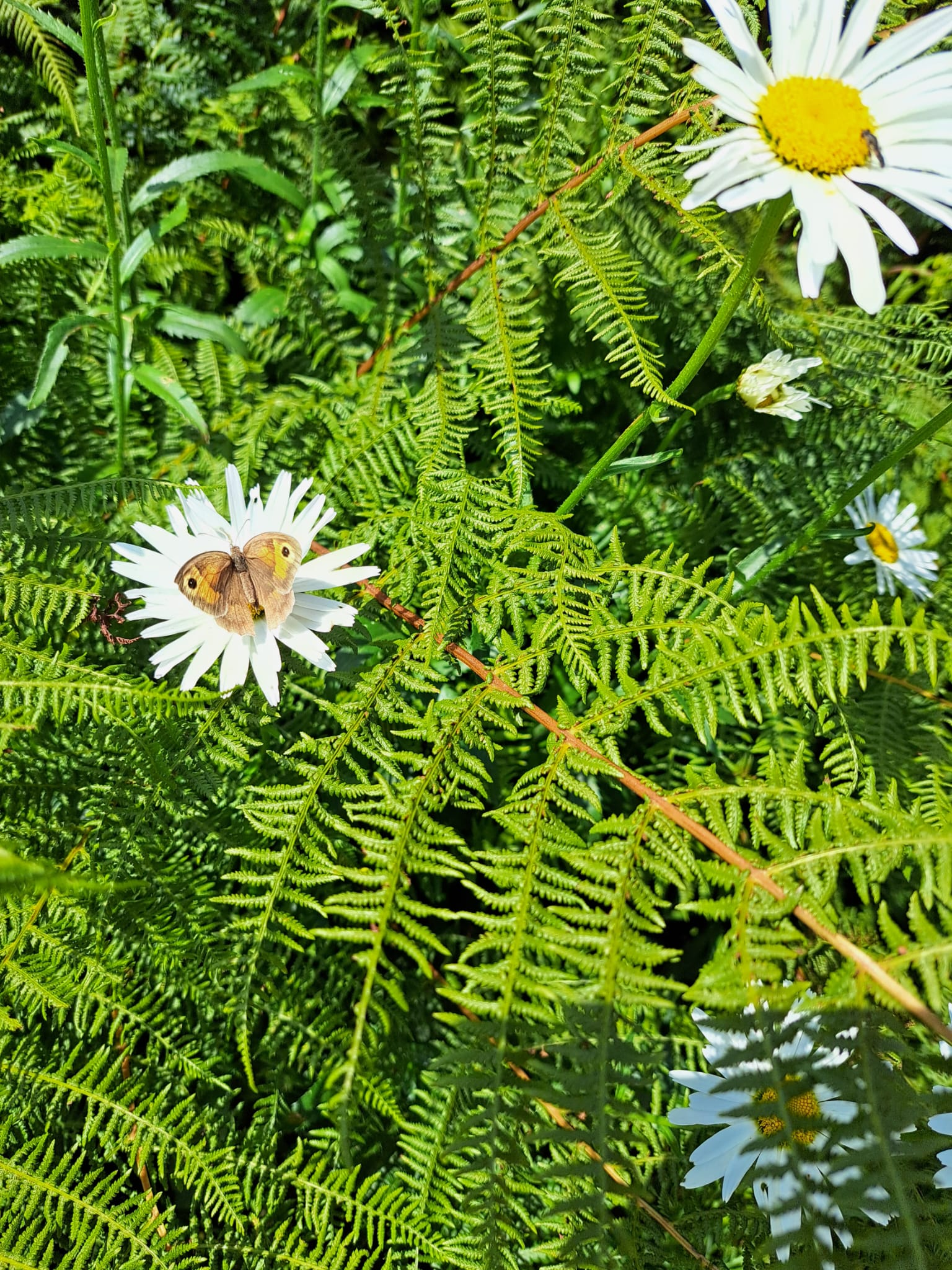
Meadow brown butterfly in a garden at Sharptor

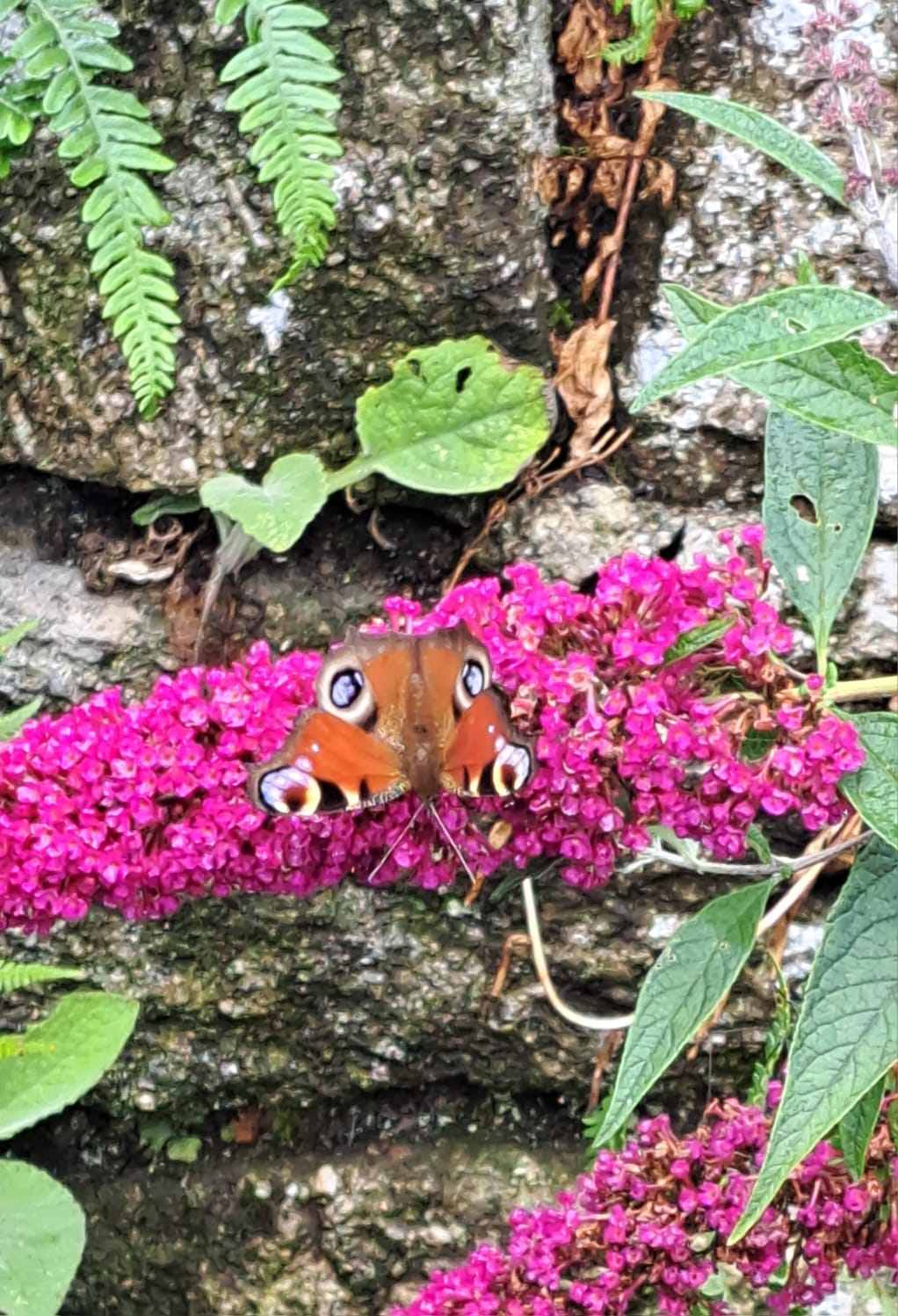
Peacock butterfly in a garden at Sharptor

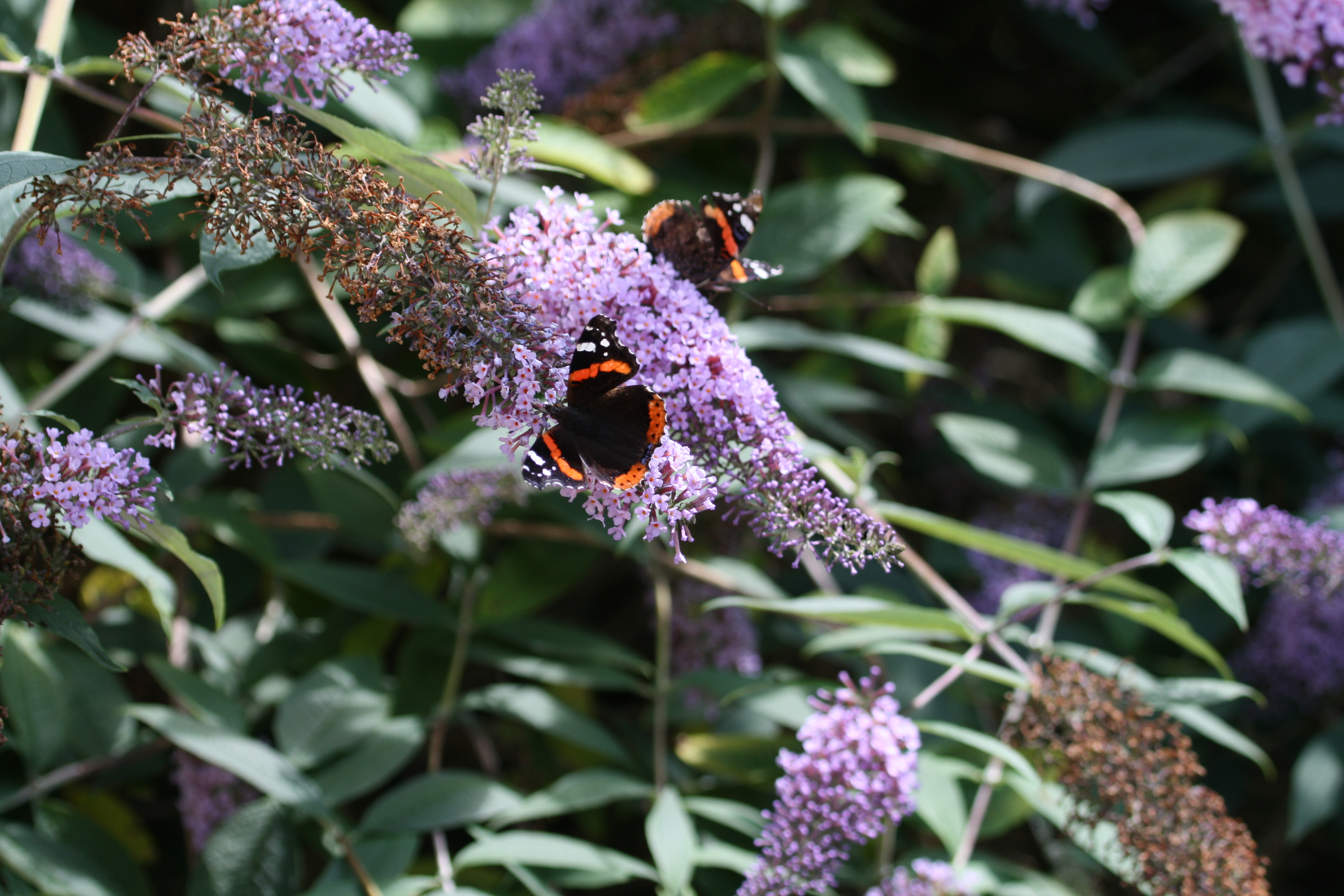
Red admiral butterfly in a garden at Sharptor

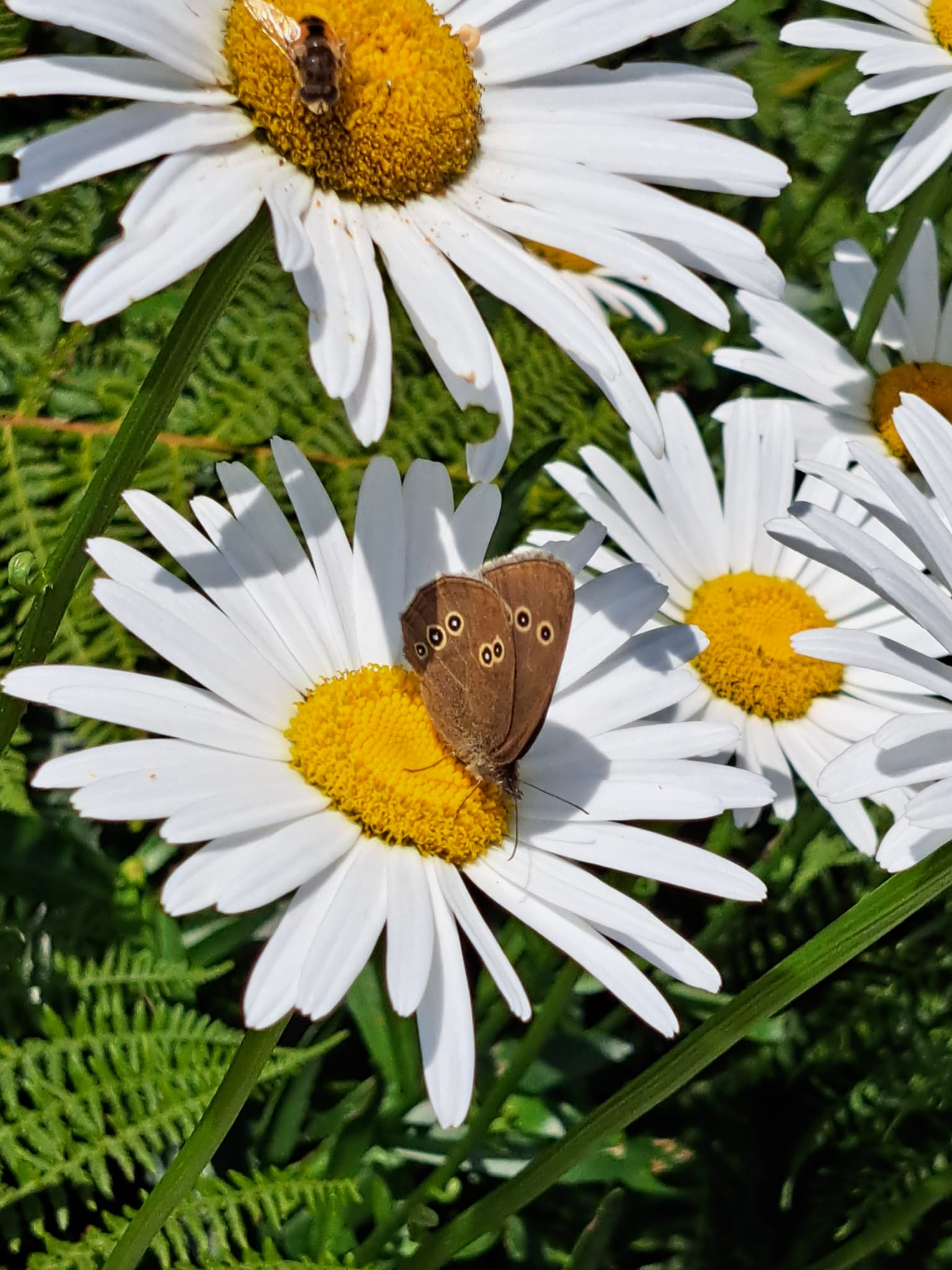
Ringlet butterfly in a garden at Sharptor

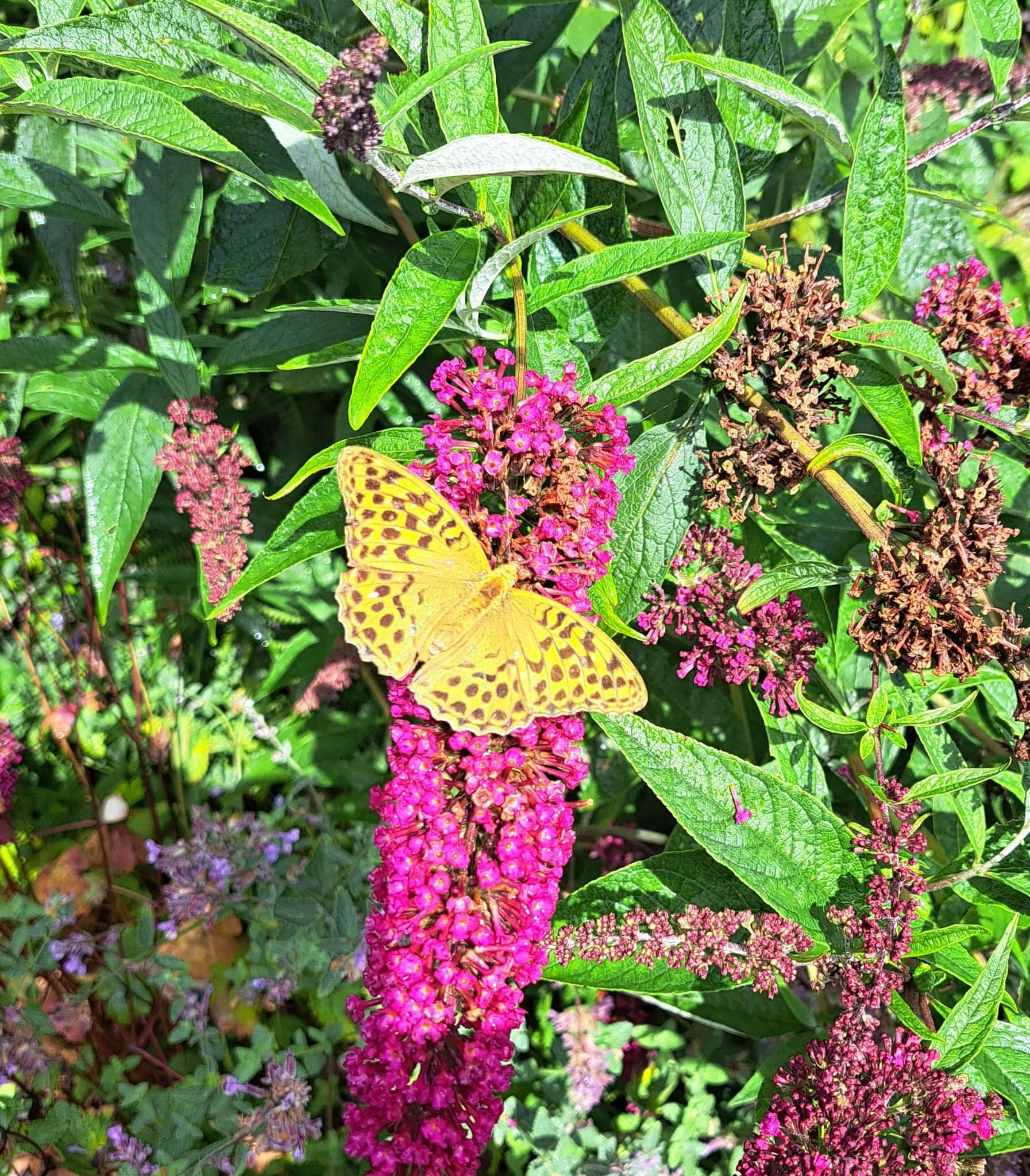
Silver washed fritillary in a garden at Sharptor

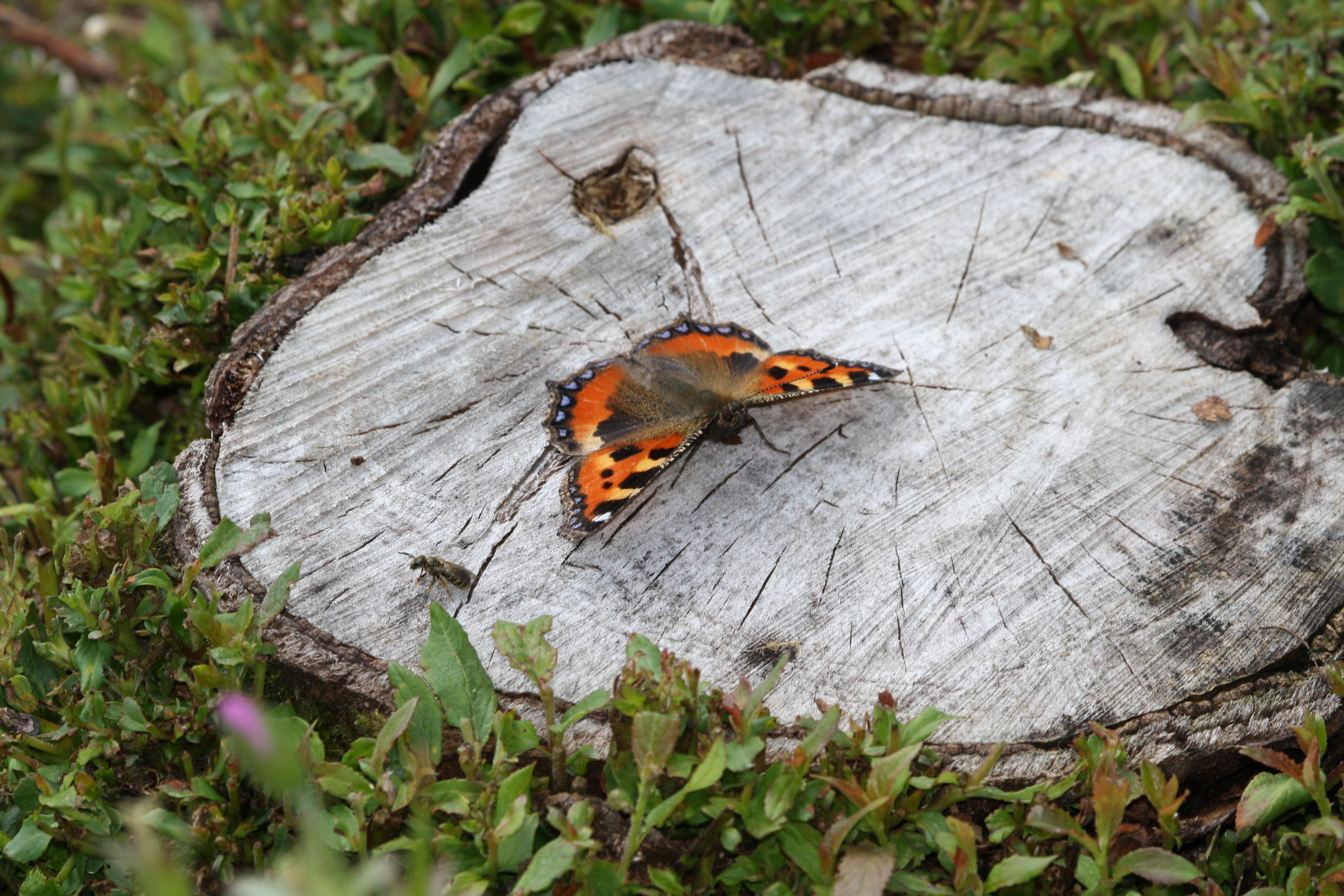
Small tortoiseshell butterfly in a garden at Sharptor

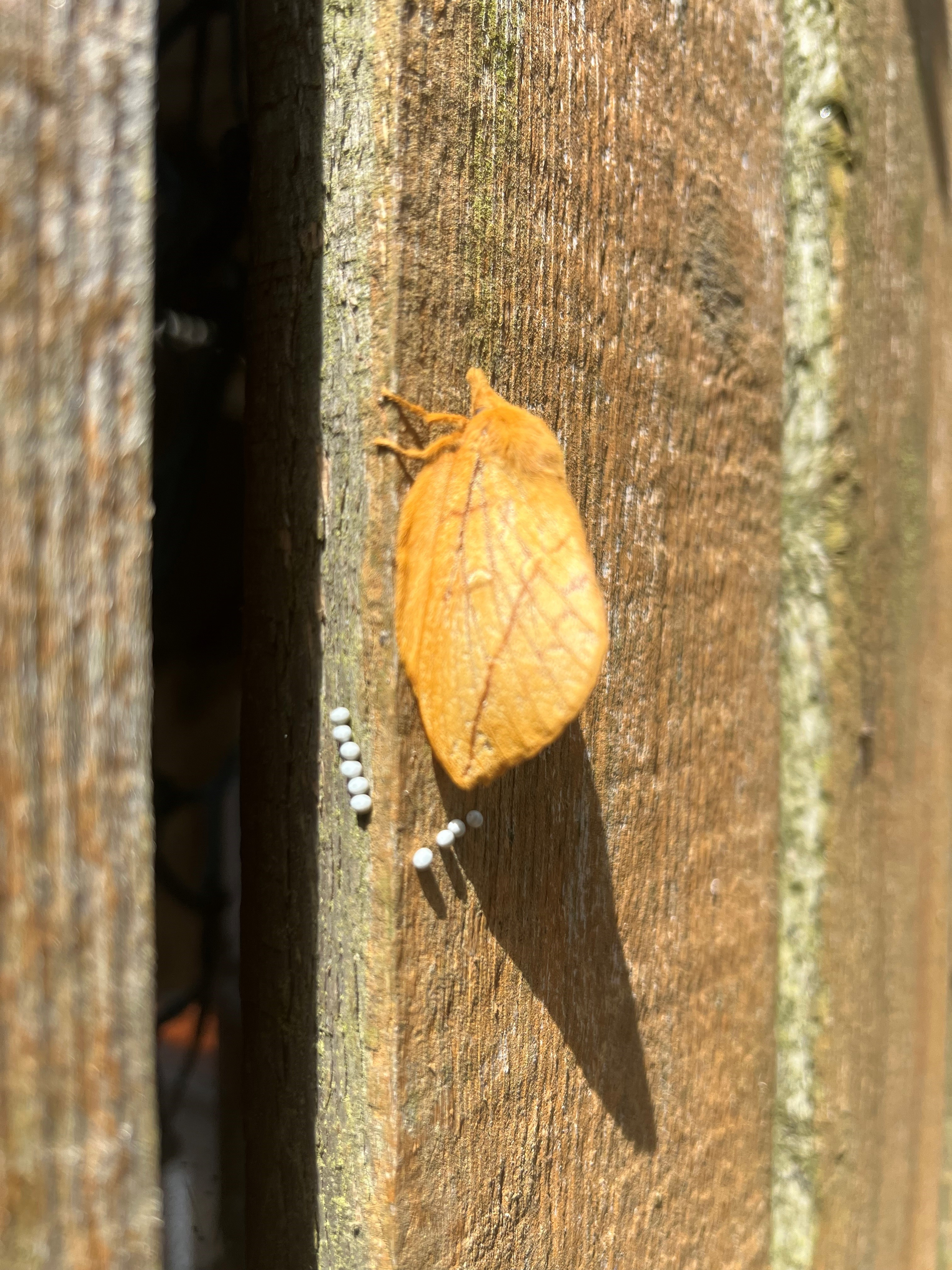
Drinker moth and eggs in a garden at Sharptor

== Economy ==
The main employment is varied as it has diversified from mining and quarrying. Farming is still a major contributor to the local economy. Wardbrook Farm, at the top of Sharptor, is a Duchy tenancy hill farm with cattle, sheep and ponies that roam the moorland.

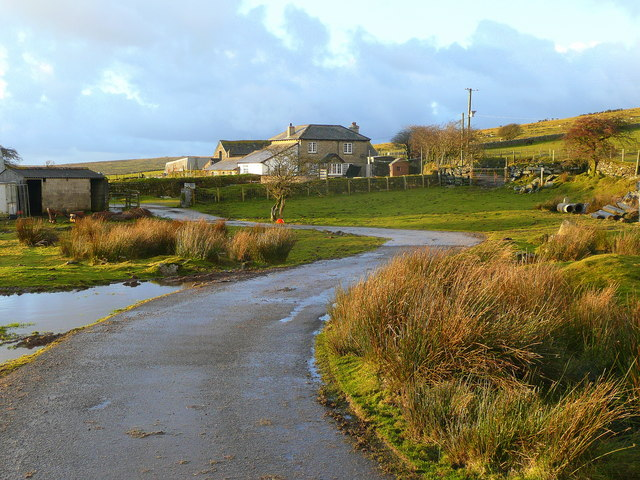
Wardbrook Farm

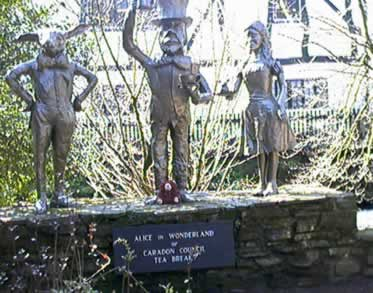
Statues at Trago Mills, Liskeard

Another local employer has been Trago Mills established by businessman Mike Robertson who bought the Liskeard site in the early 1960s after leaving a career in the RAF. Trago Mills brings a lot of visitors to shop and also visit the other amenities such as restaurants and other outlets connected to the site. The Liskeard site has a rather eclectic grouping of statues depicting various disputes of the owner with local officials. Artwork around the location also depicts stories about the previous history of being an explosive powder mill and also the various characters that have interacted with the owners including Sir Edward Heath. There is a selection of birds in cages as well as free-range peacocks. There is also a large number of attractive cockerels that roam the parking and outdoor section of the shop.

== Community amenities ==
Upton Cross Academy provides primary education for nearby settlements, including Sharptor, from nursery to years 5&6. Secondary education is provided by Liskeard School and Community College.

The nearest primary medical care is provided by Oak Tree Surgery & Pensilva Health Centre (4.0 miles (6.4 km)). The Care Quality Commission (CQC) last inspection was on 19 December 2018 with the report published on 17 January 2019. The Latest review was on 5 April 2023. The CQC rated the Oak Tree Surgery & Pensilva Health Centre as "Good". There are two facilities, the main being in Liskeard (Oak Tree Surgery) and a second in Pensilva (Pensilva Health Centre). Accident and emergency services are provided by Derriford Hospital in Plymouth (26.6 miles (42.8 km)). The last CQC inspection was on 28 September 2022 the report was published on 8 March 2023 with hospital rated as "Requires Improvement".

The nearest church is Saint Paul's Church Upton Cross which is part of the Callington Cluster and the Anglican Diocese of Truro. St Paul's was built in the 19th Century as a daughter Church to St Melor's, Linkinhorne, to serve the mining community in Caradon Hill and the surrounding districts.

Although Sharptor itself does not have any outlets for food or drink, there is a tearoom in Minions that is also a post office and village shop.

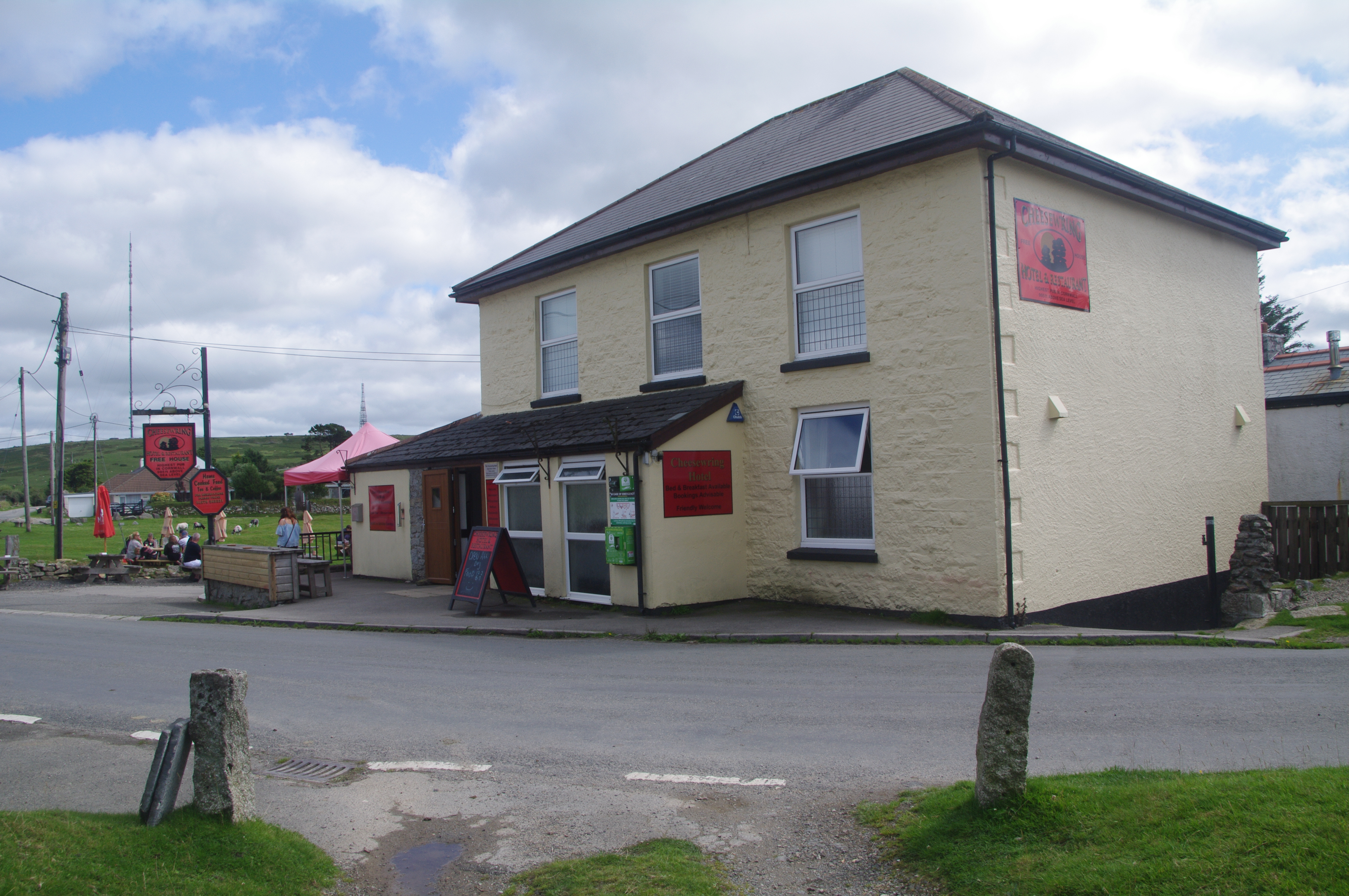
Cheesewring Hotel, Minions, August 2021 before the fire in December 2021

There has been a public house in Minions dating back to 1836. The current public house, The Cheesewring, suffered a fire that started on the morning of 24 December 2021 which caused substantial damage. Many of the residents of Sharptor would walk to The Cheesewring across the moor. Plans to rebuild the Cheesering were among the latest planning applications submitted to Cornwall Council in the week beginning 29 May 2023. The planning was subsequently withdrawn.

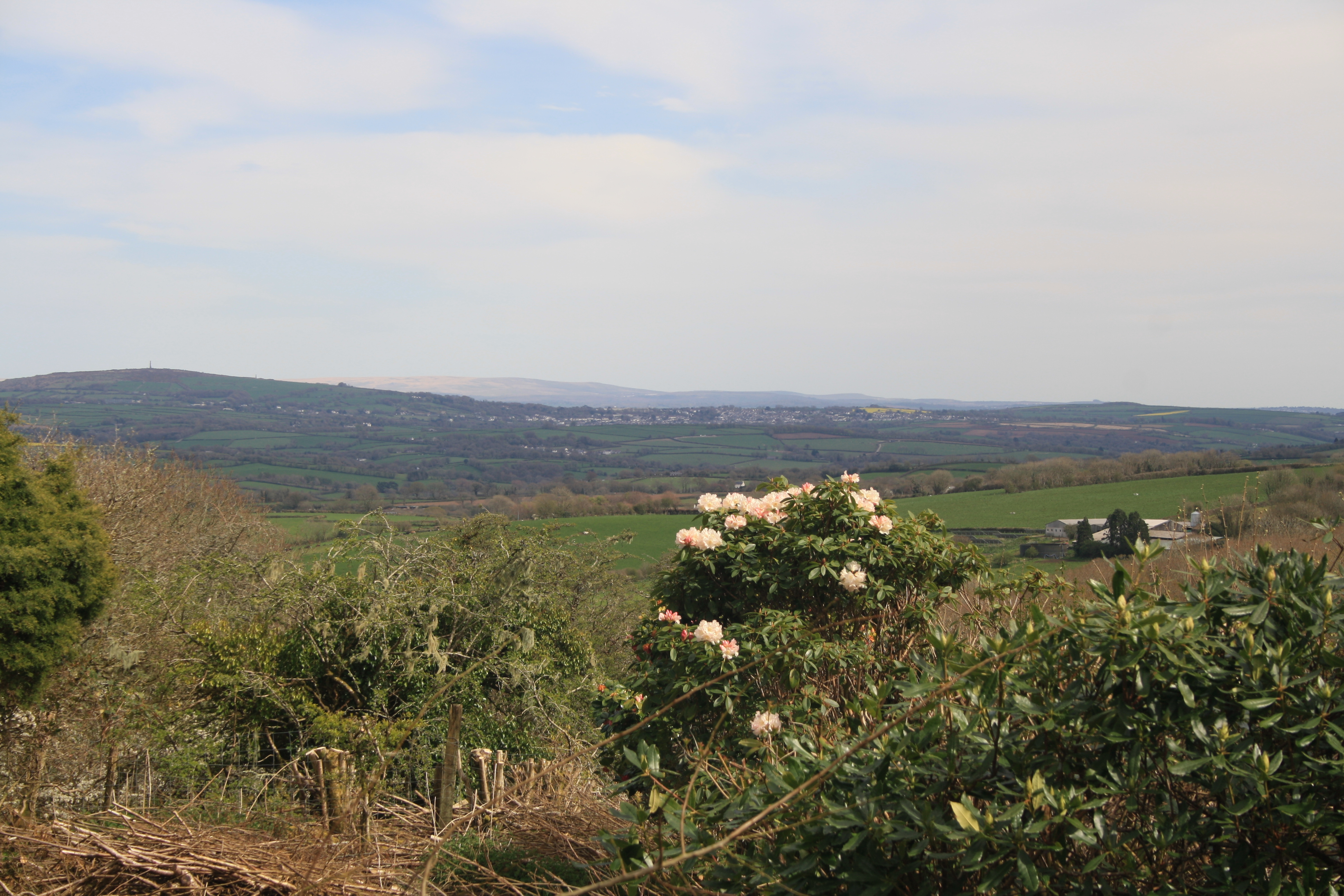
Kit Hill, Dartmoor, and the Cornish Cheese Company (farm) from Sharptor

== Sport and recreation ==
Sharptor offers some good walks and cycling, including routes to Sharp Tor and Stowe's Hill. There are several climbing and bouldering opportunities. Sharptor gives direct access to Bodmin Moor on horseback, but the road is steep and vehicular access is restrictive.

Nearby, Lower Lake Shooting Ground offers instruction from total beginner to advanced Clay pigeon shooting.

== Transport ==
=== Bus ===
Sharptor is relatively remote and does not have any direct public transport links. The nearest bus stop is at Darley Ford Garage, 1.3 miles (2.1 km), where the 78 bus runs north and south with the route, northward, Liskeard to Launceston, via Pensilva, North Hill, and South Petherwin via Pensilva, North Hill, South Petherwin and in reverse southward.

=== Rail ===
The nearest mainline rail service is Liskeard, 8 miles (13 km). Trains run northwest to London Paddington station and southwest to Penzance railway station. The trains are run by GWR.

=== Air ===
The nearest airport is Newquay Airport (IATA: NQY, ICAO: EGHQ) which is around 32 miles (51 km) from Sharptor. The airport runs mainly a seasonal schedule running flights to London-Gatwick, Dublin, Manchester, Edinburgh, Belfast-City, Glasgow, Newcastle, Faro, Alicante, Aberdeen, Düsseldorf, Isles of Scilly, Zurich, London-Stansted, East Midlands, and Copenhagen

Newquay airport is also home to Cornwall Air Ambulance and HM Coastguard, whose helicopters are regularly seen over Sharp Tor and Stowe's Hill training.

=== Space ===
In 2019, it was announced that the airport would host Spaceport Cornwall a base for Virgin Orbit.

In January 2023, the first attempt to launch the first UK rocket taking satellites into space suffered an anomaly, spelling an end to the mission. Cosmic Girl, a modified Boeing 747-400 jet, took off on 9 January 2023 and launched LauncherOne which failed to reach orbit. Mar 2023 - Virgin Orbit announced that almost all staff will be furloughed which comes after its first launch from Cornwall ended in failure.

== Culture ==
Sharptor Mine is mentioned in the Retallick Saga by E. V. Thompson. E. V. Thompson was a resident of Sharptor and lived in Idle Cottage, one of the stone miners' cottages in lower Sharptor. One of Mr. Thompson's books, Chase the Wind, was voted the best historical novel of the year (1980). He Said The storylines come from researching. In my very first book I was sitting on the doorstep of an old miner's cottage, wondering about the people who lived there before - most probably Idle Cottage.

Also nearby is the Sterts Theatre and Arts Centre which is a converted pig farm with an open-air amphitheater and arts center. The conversion was undertaken by the founders Ewart and Anne Sturrock in 1982. Sterts Theatre puts on live performances, from family-friendly musicals to comedy nights and other live events in an open-air atmosphere.

Filming for Miss Peregrine's Home for Peculiar Children took place in 2015 mainly around Minions but some scenes were filmed around Sharptor but did not make the final cut.

== Gallery ==
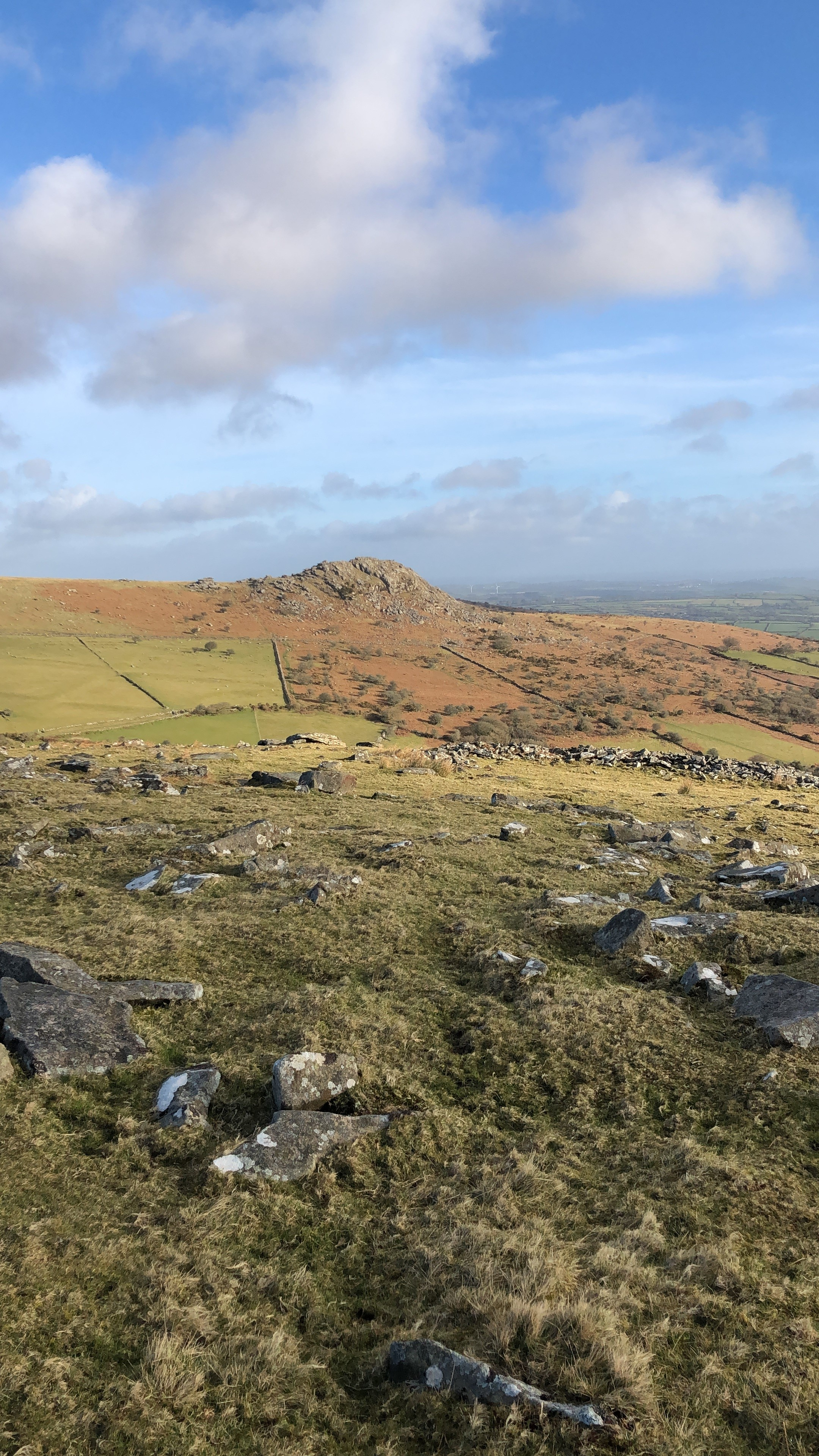
Sharp Tor looking over from Stowe's Hill

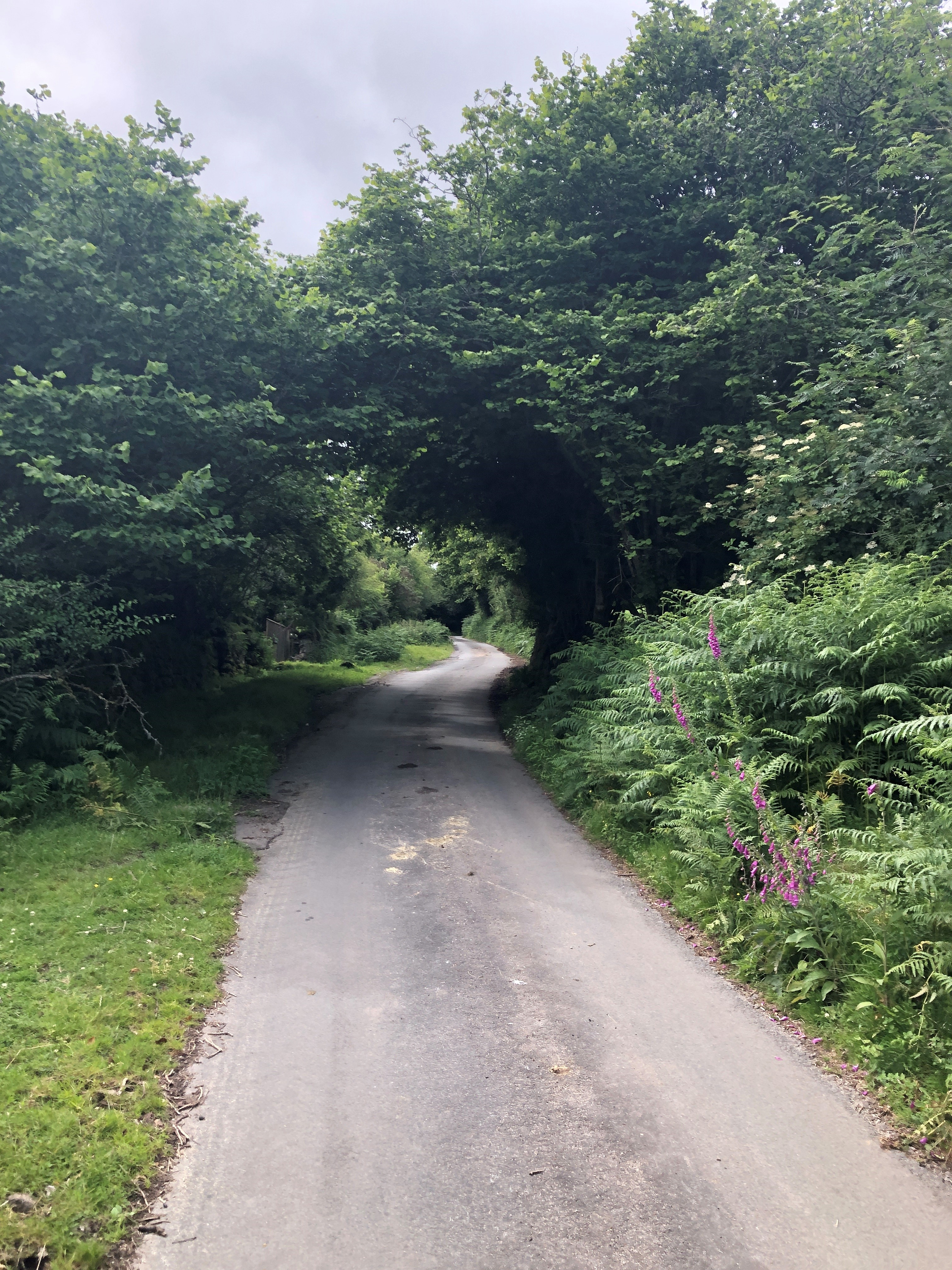
The road up through Sharptor

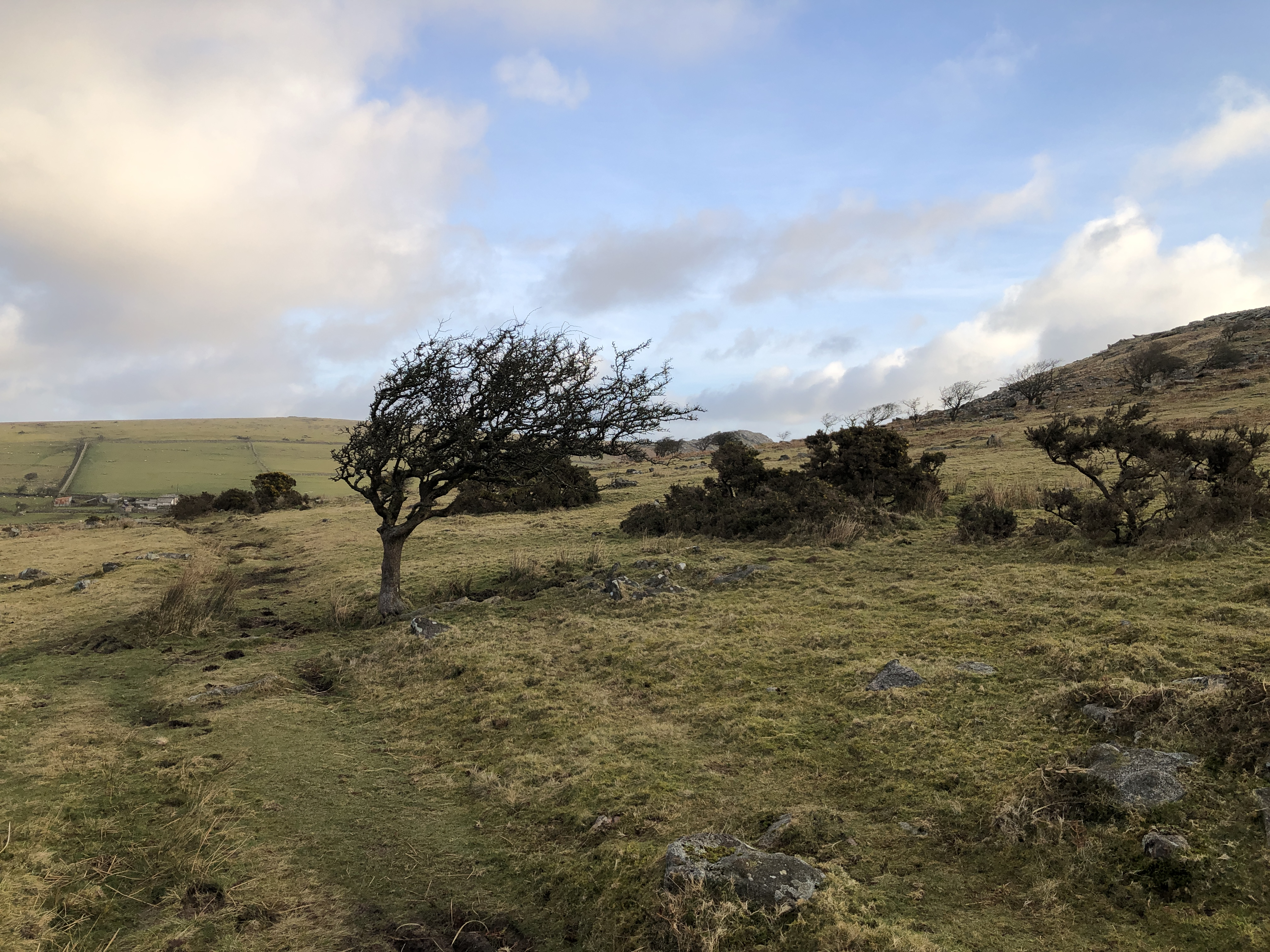
Wind-blown tree on the moor above Sharptor

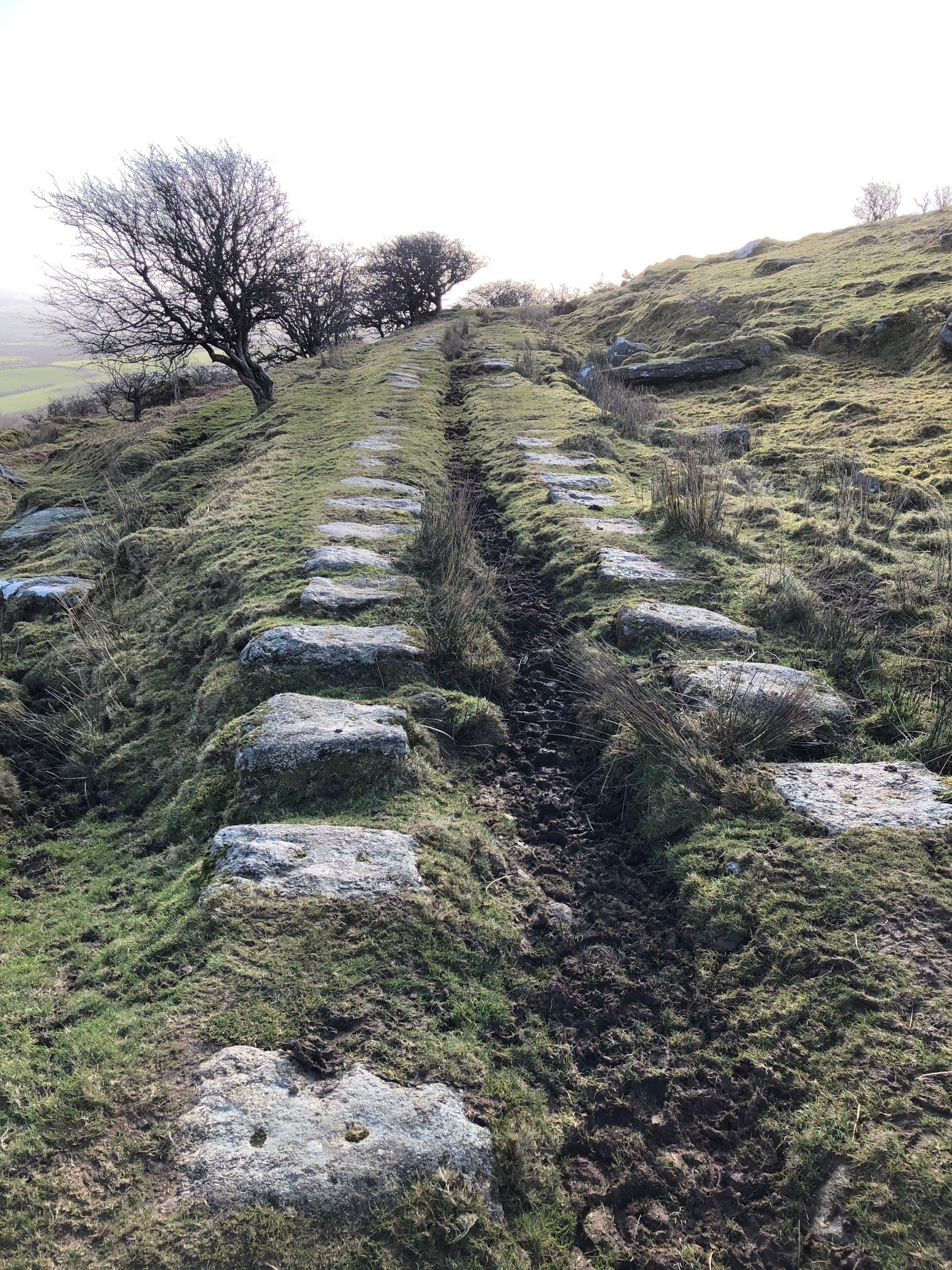
Old railway track on the moor above Sharptor

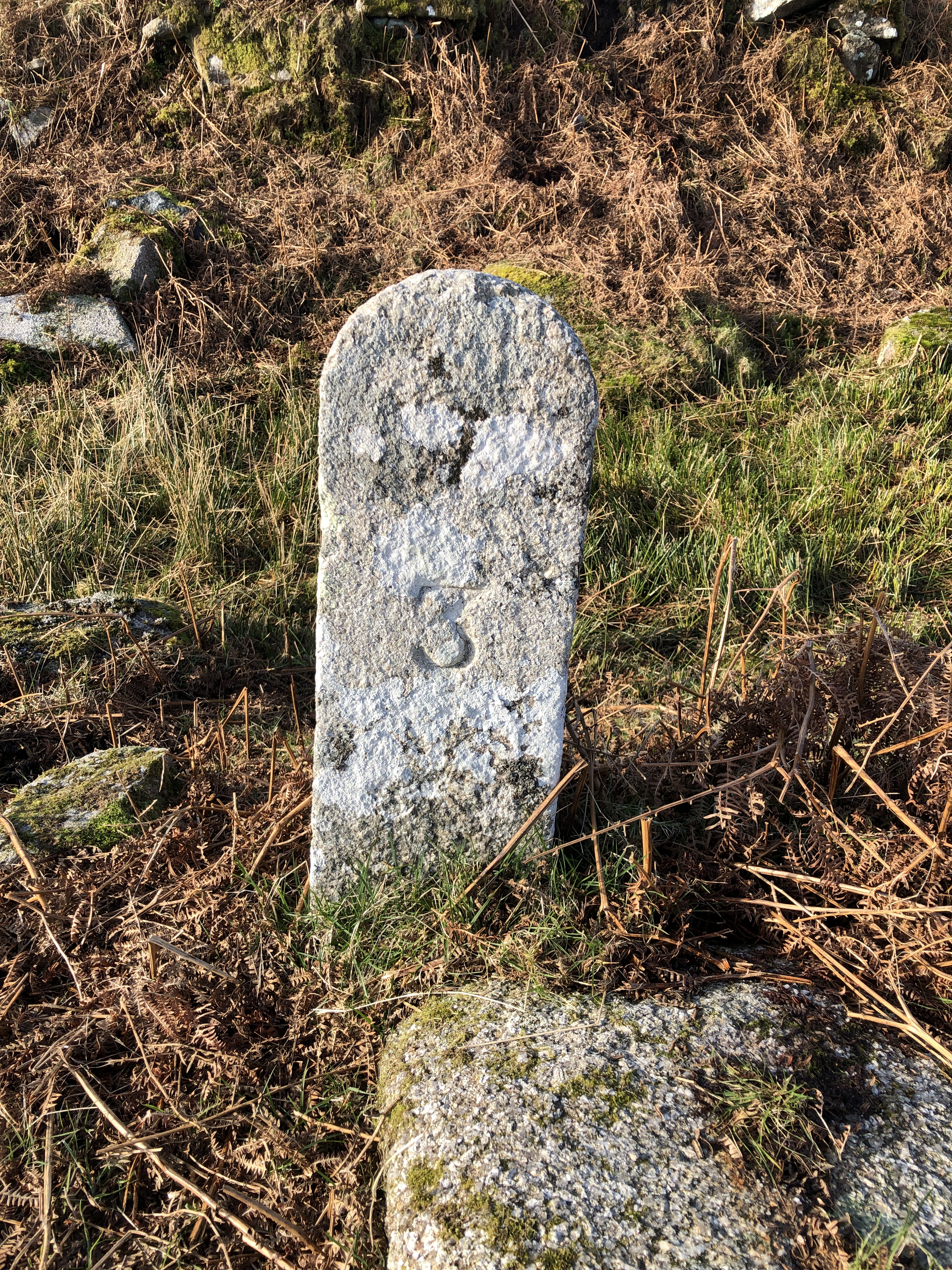
Mile post on old railway above Sharptor

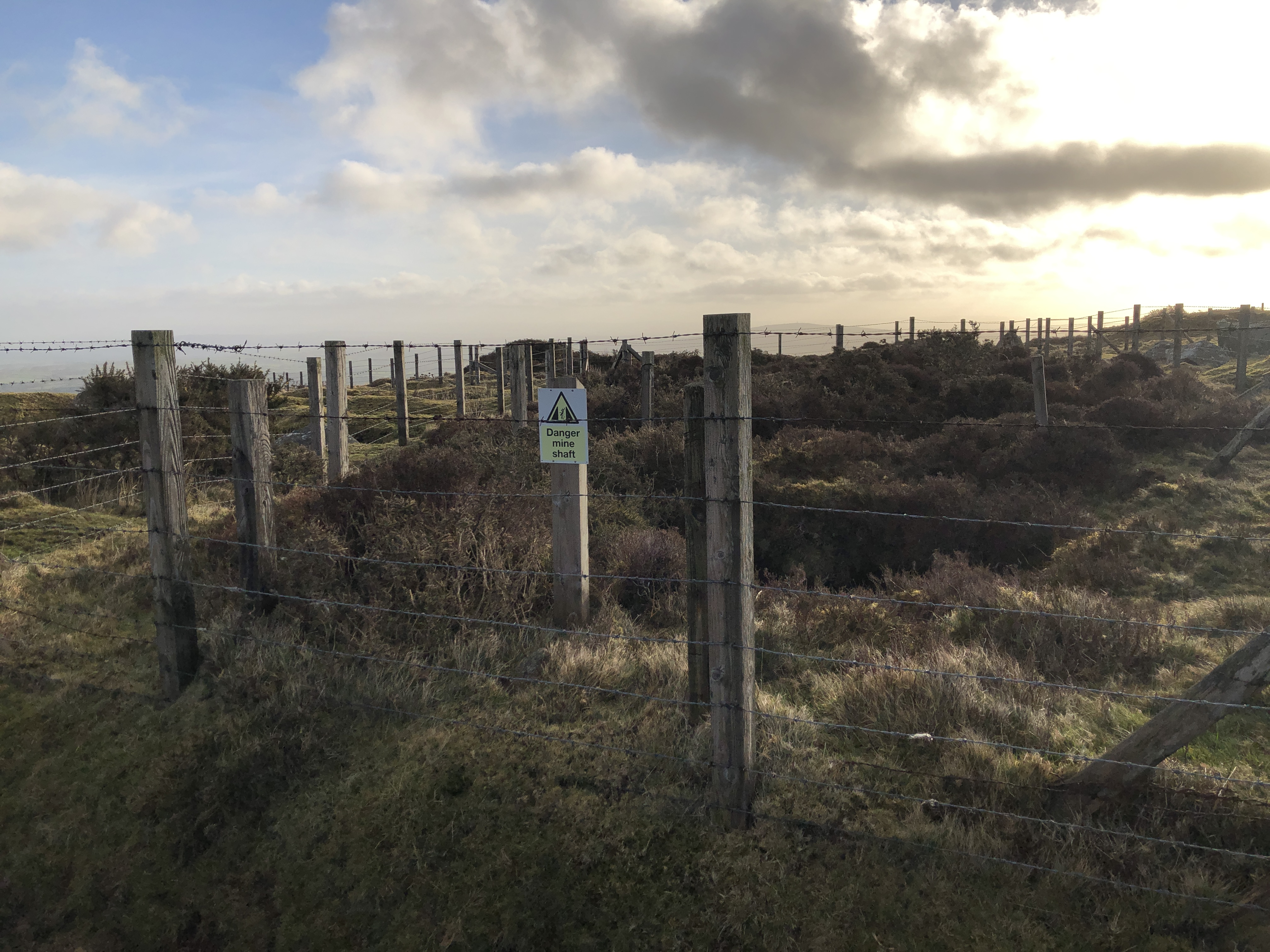
Typical mineshaft above Sharptor

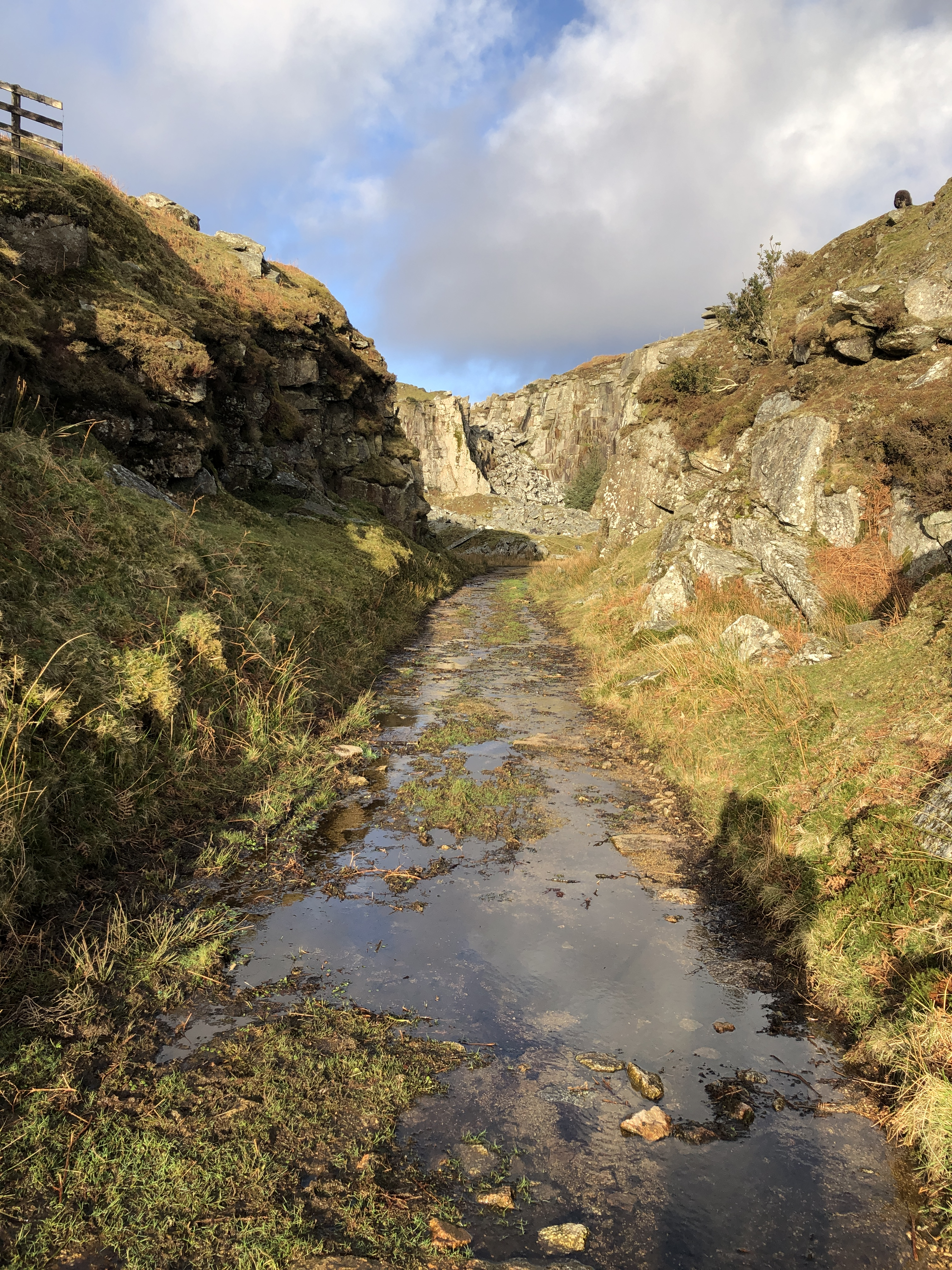
Entrance to Cheesewring Quarry above Sharptor

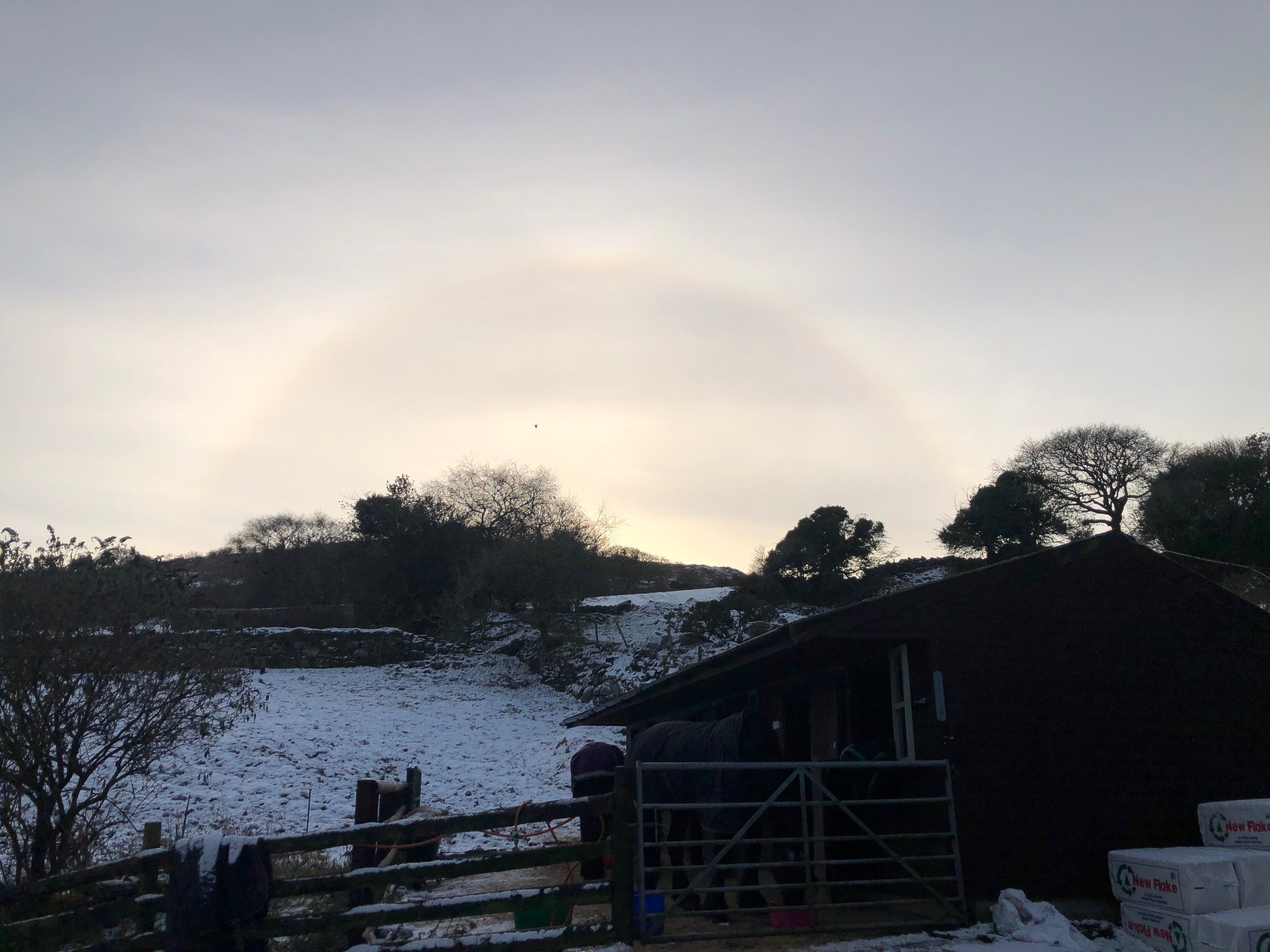
22° halo and snow on Stowe's Hill from Sharptor

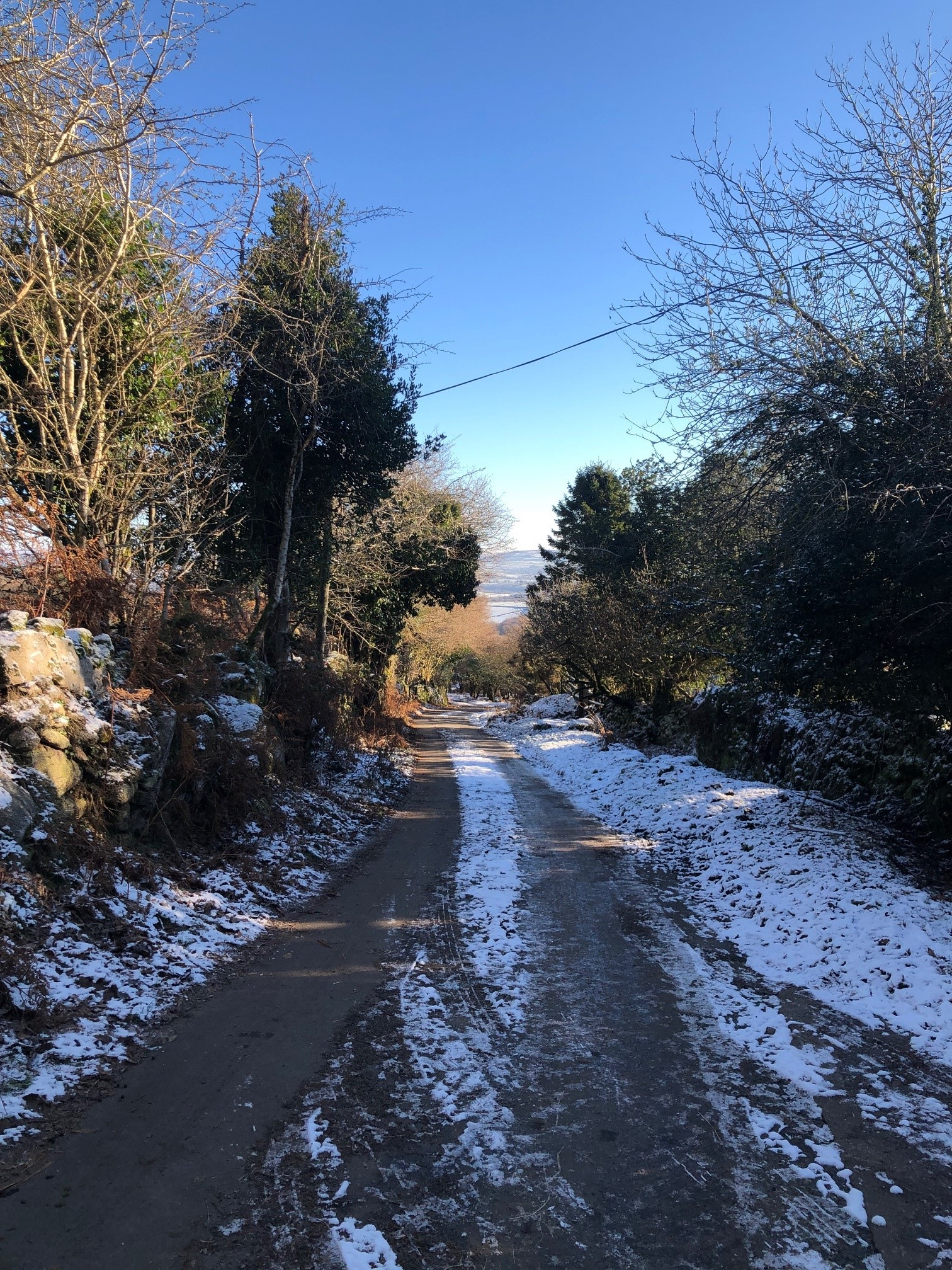
Light snowfall in the lane up through Sharptor

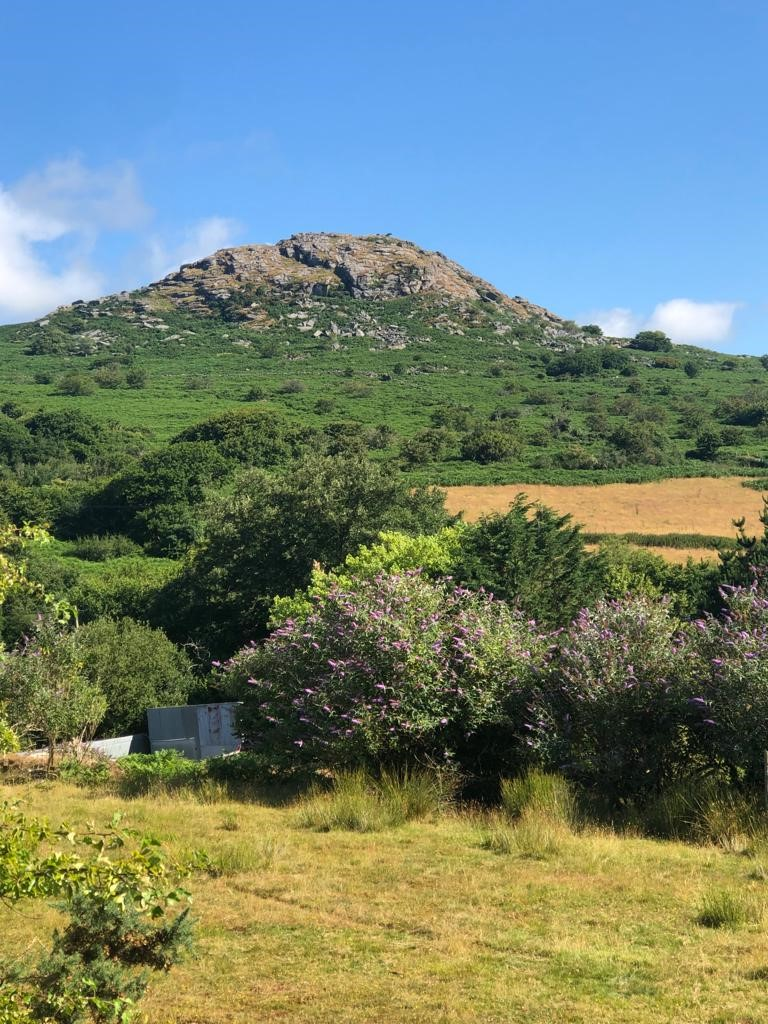
Sharptor

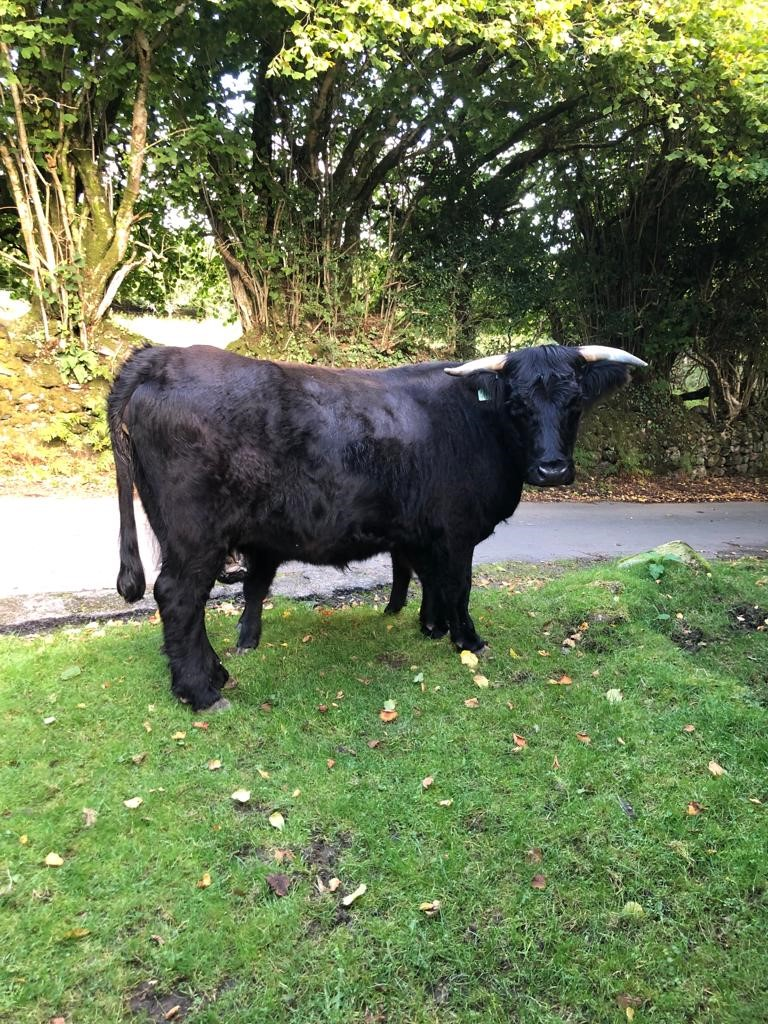
Cow in the lane at Sharptor

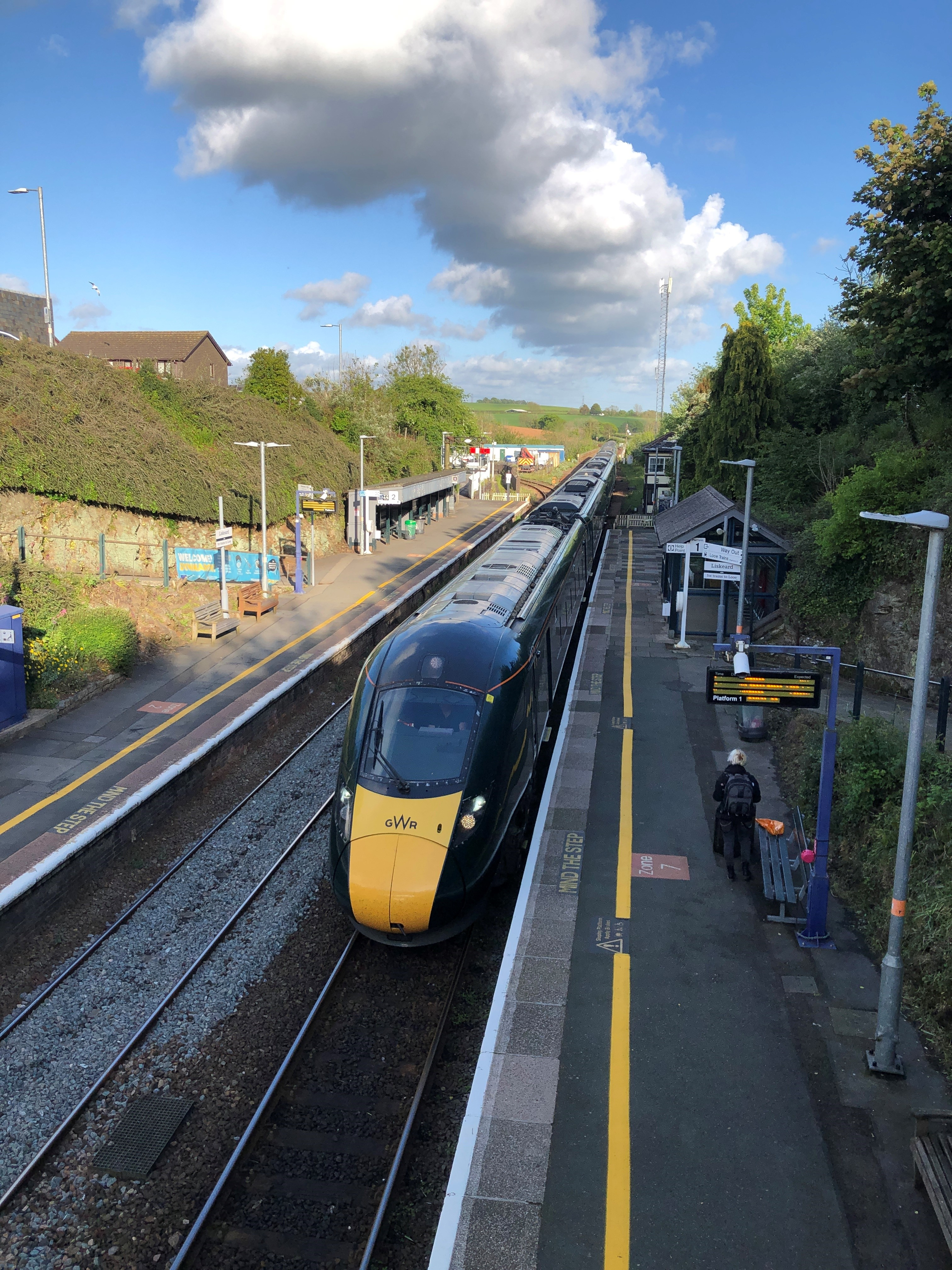
Train pulling into Liskeard Station

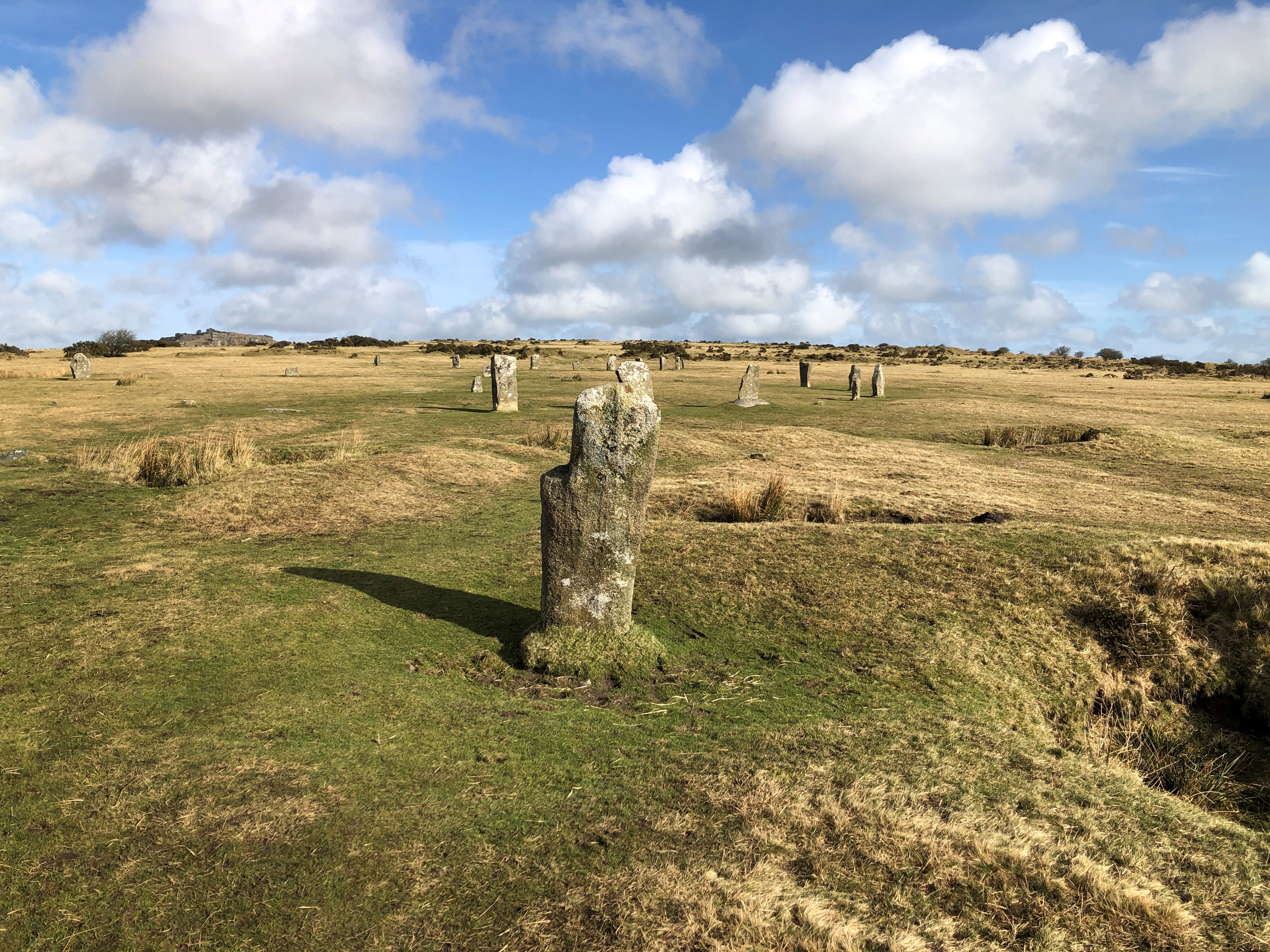
Hurlers Stones Minions near Sharptor

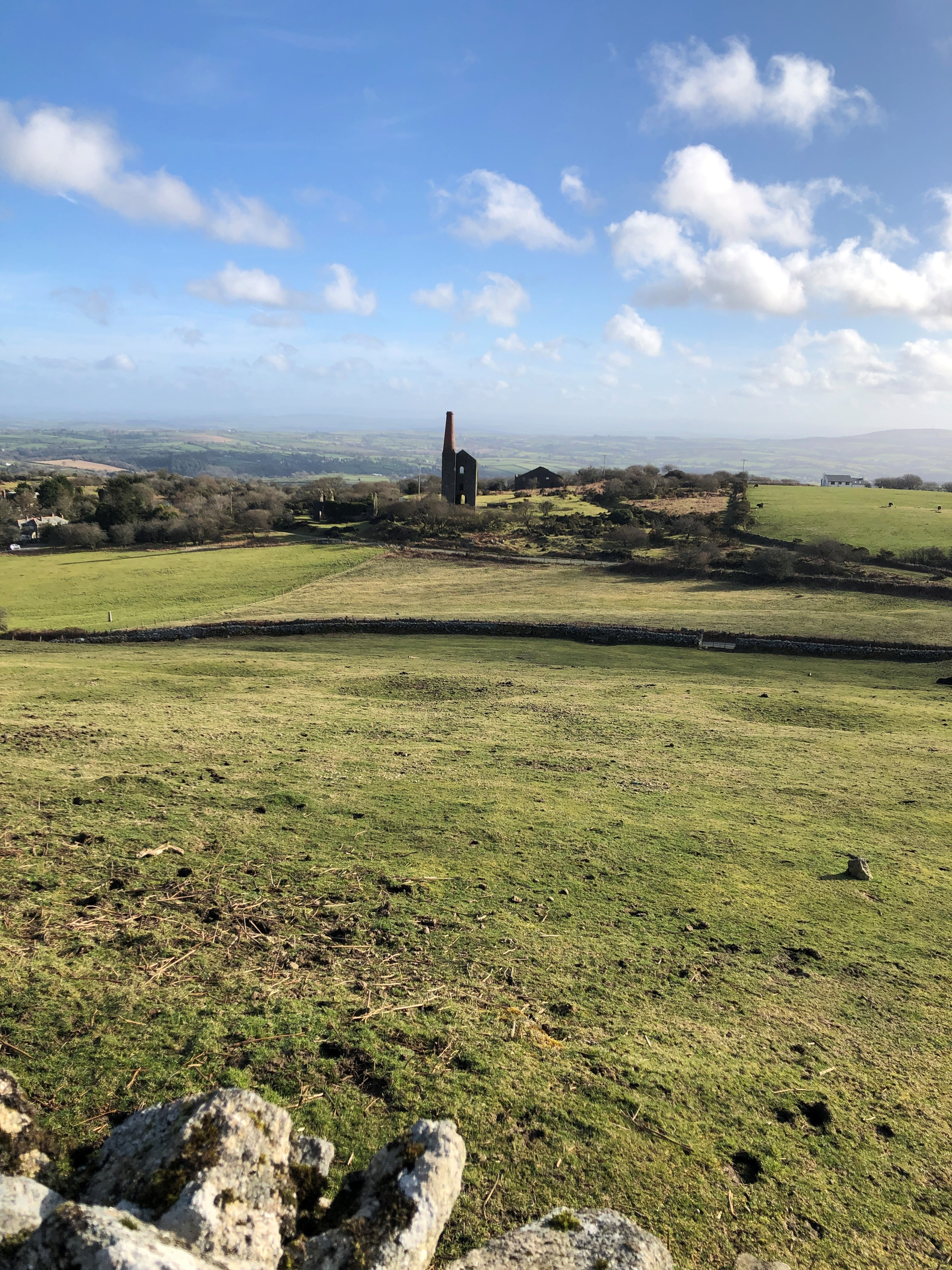
Phoenix Mine from Stowe's Hill near Higher Stanbear as seen from Stowe's Hill

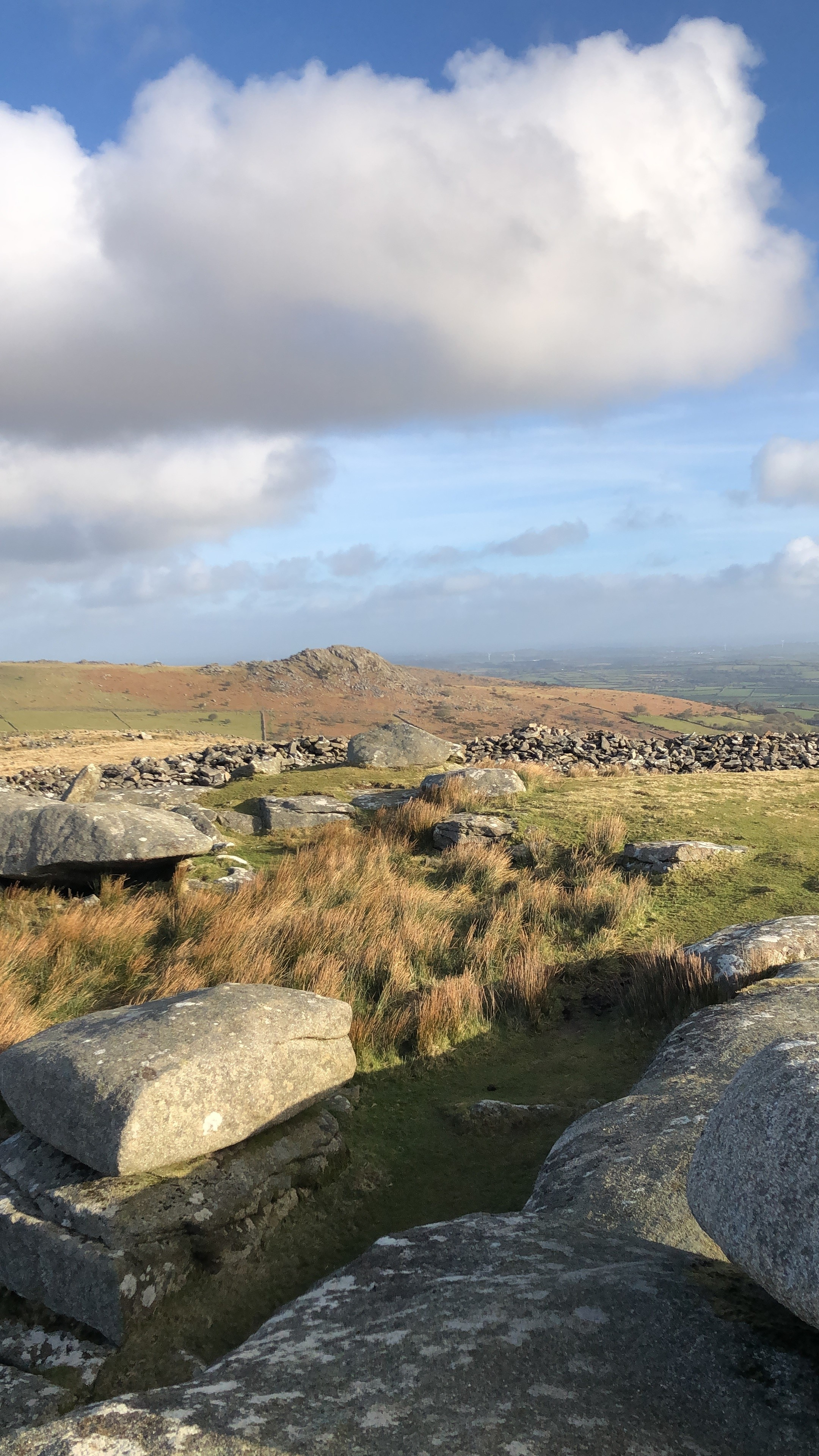
Sharptor from Stowe's Hill

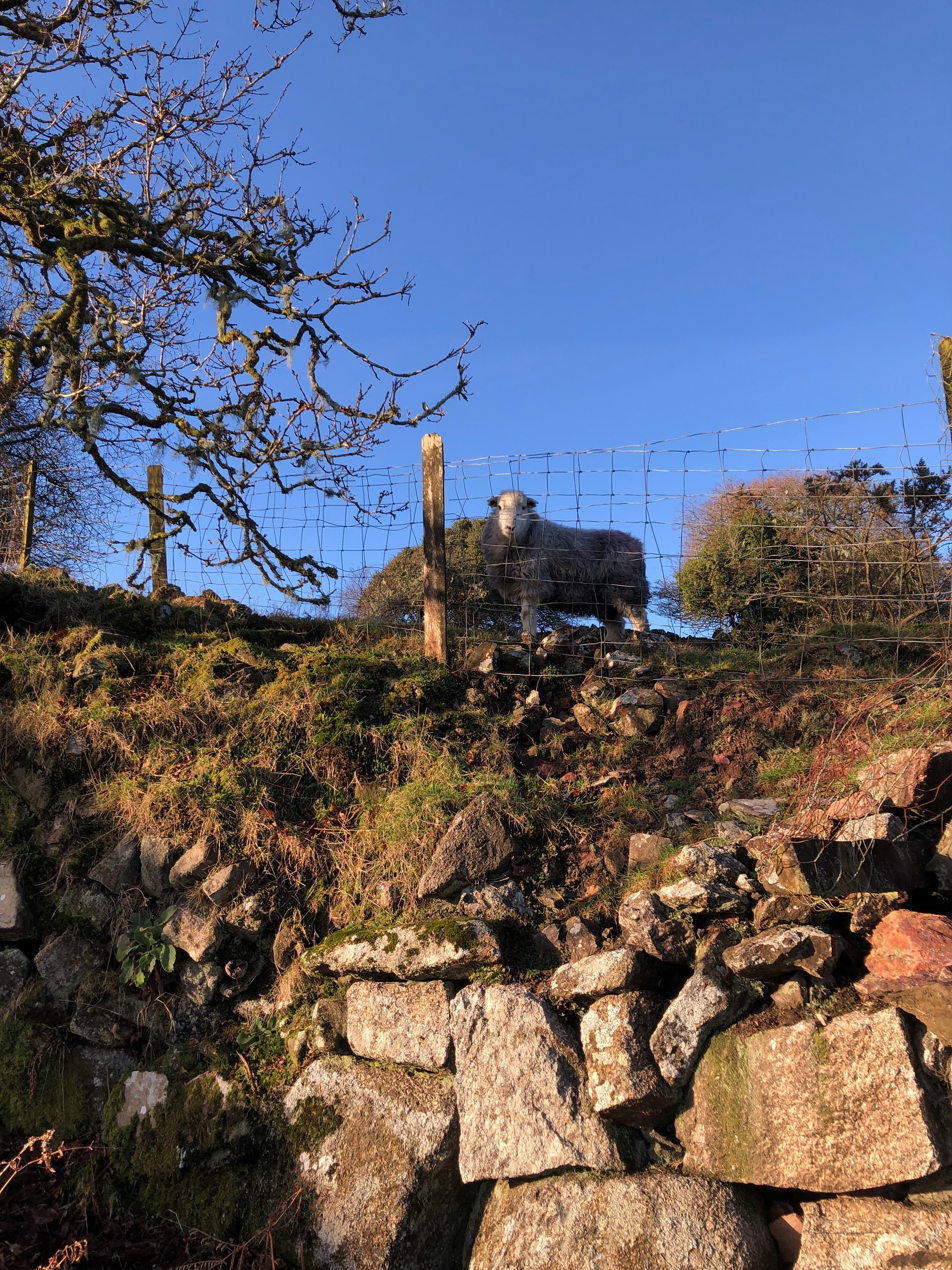
Cornish hedge and sheep at Sharptor

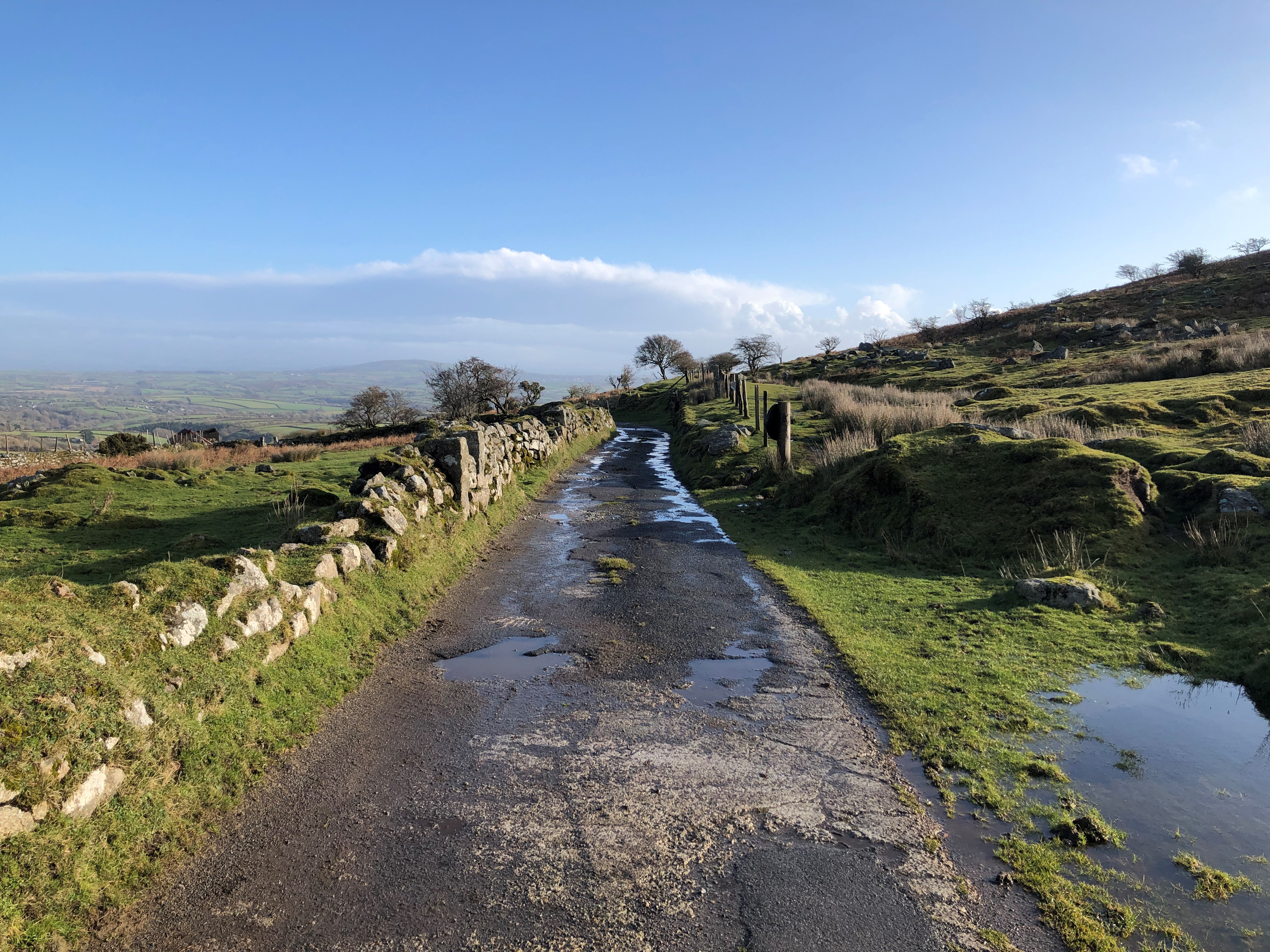
Road above Sharptor

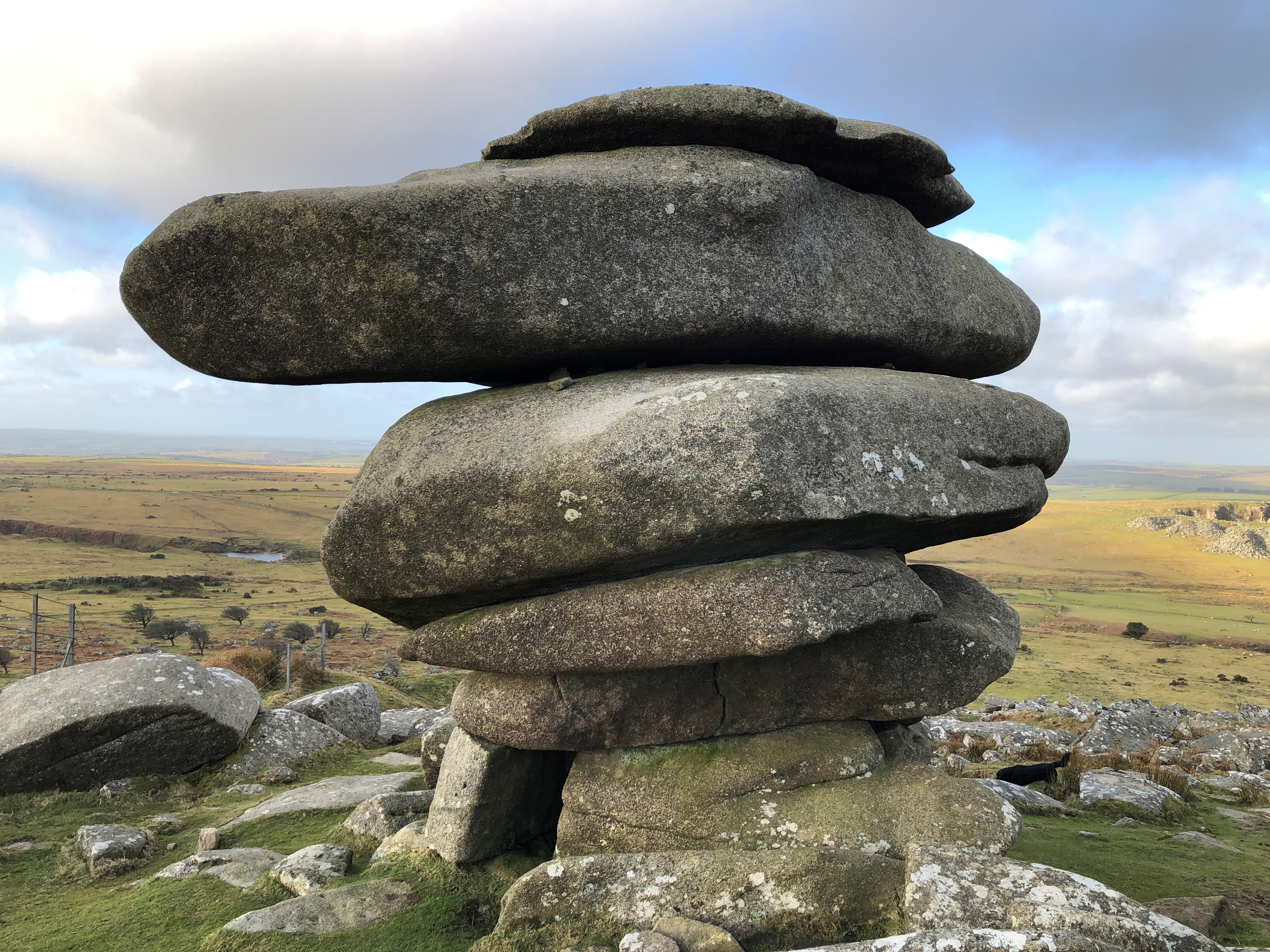
Cheesewring stones above Sharptor

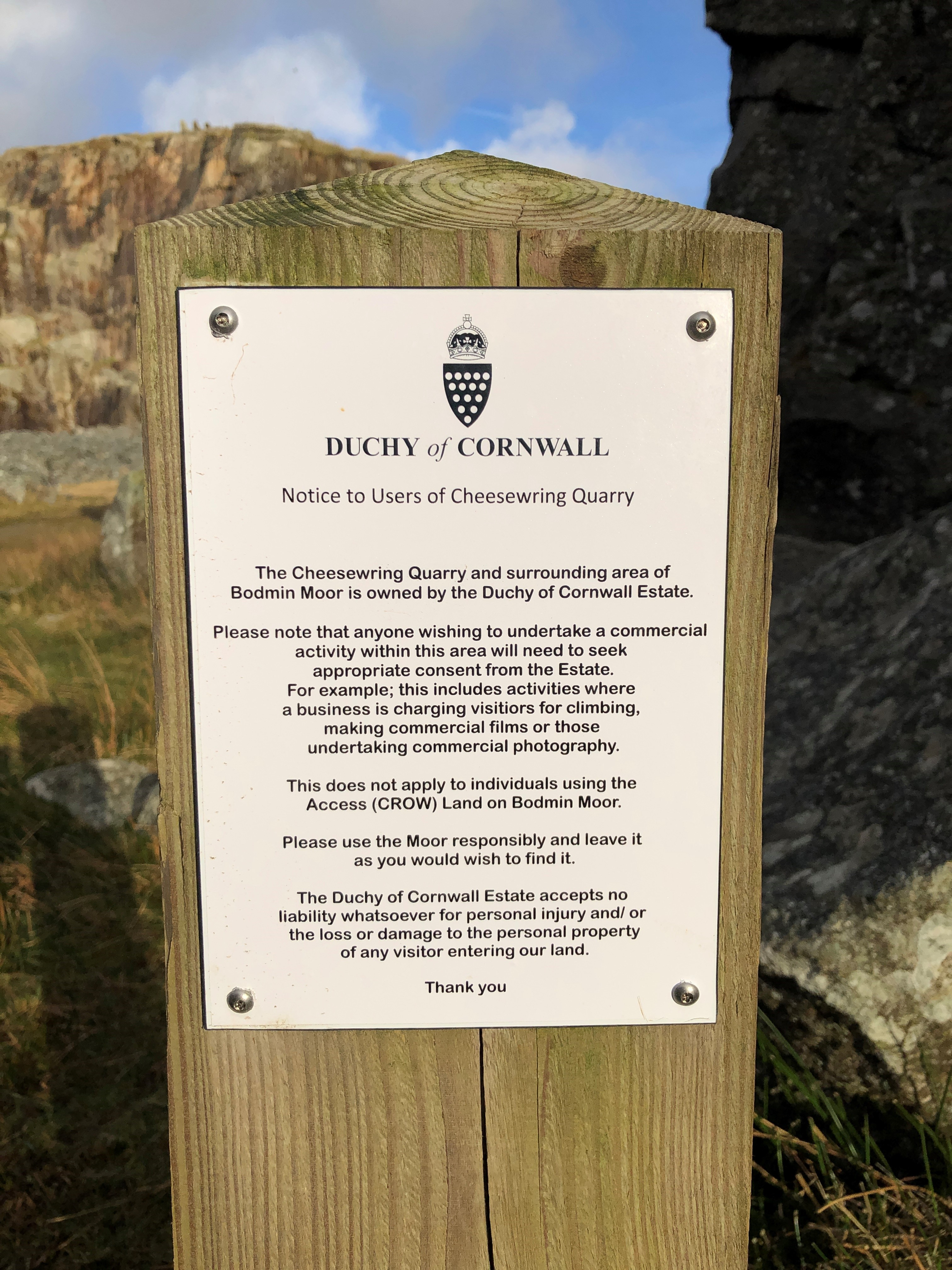
Duchy sign at Cheesewring Quarry above Sharptor

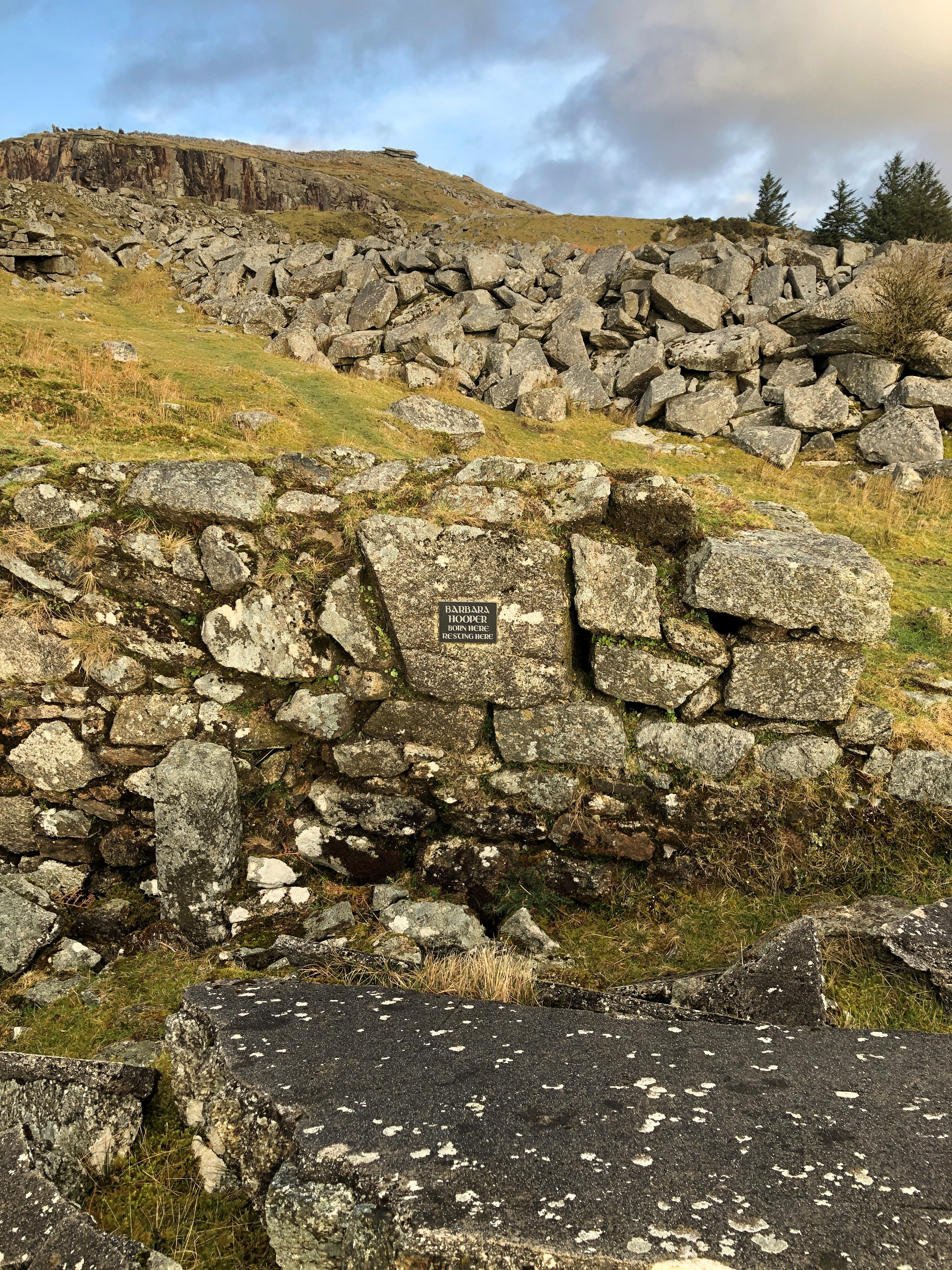
Cheesewring quarry Stowe's Hill above Sharptor

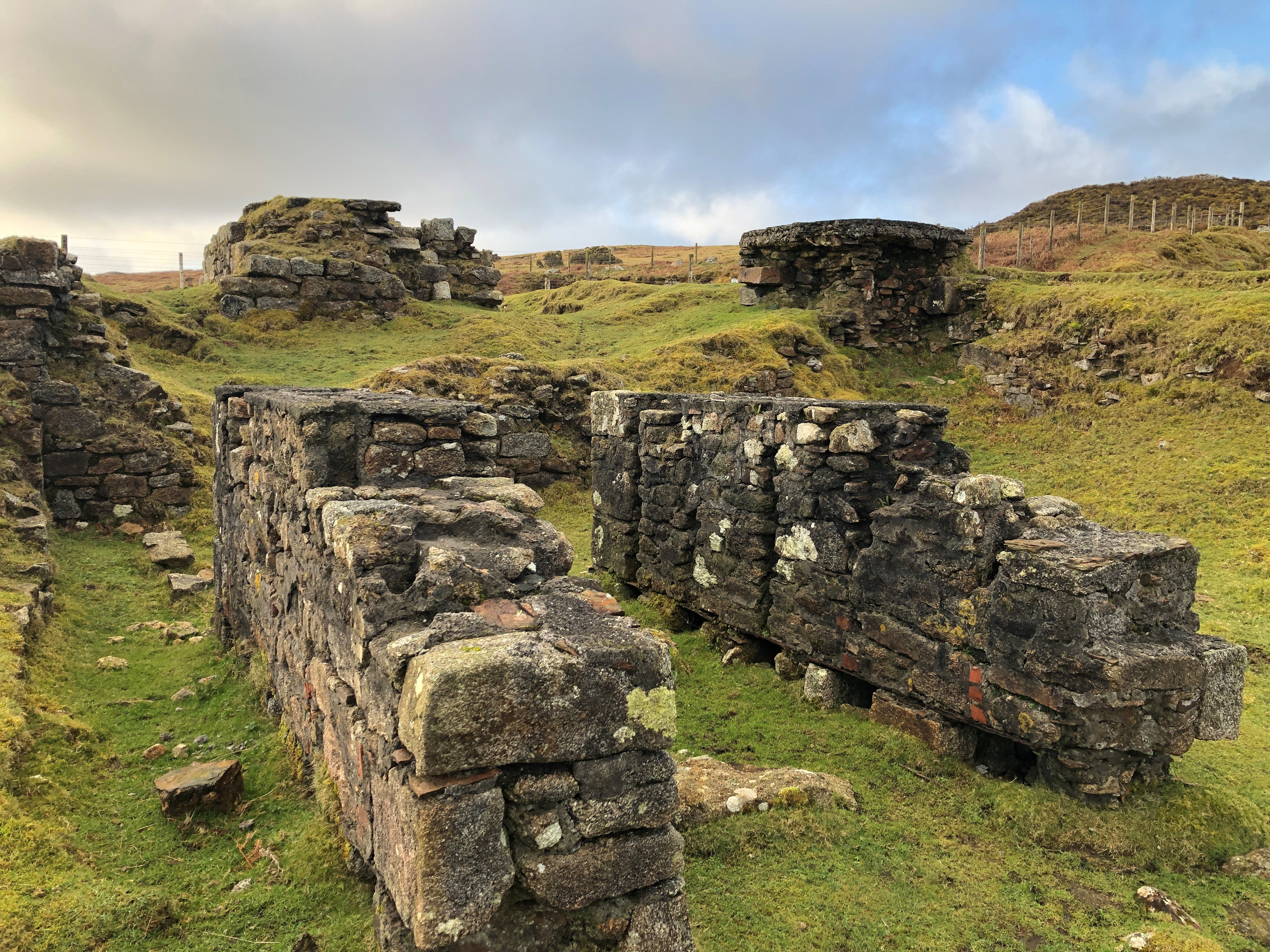
Engine mounts at mine works on Stowe's Hill above Sharptor

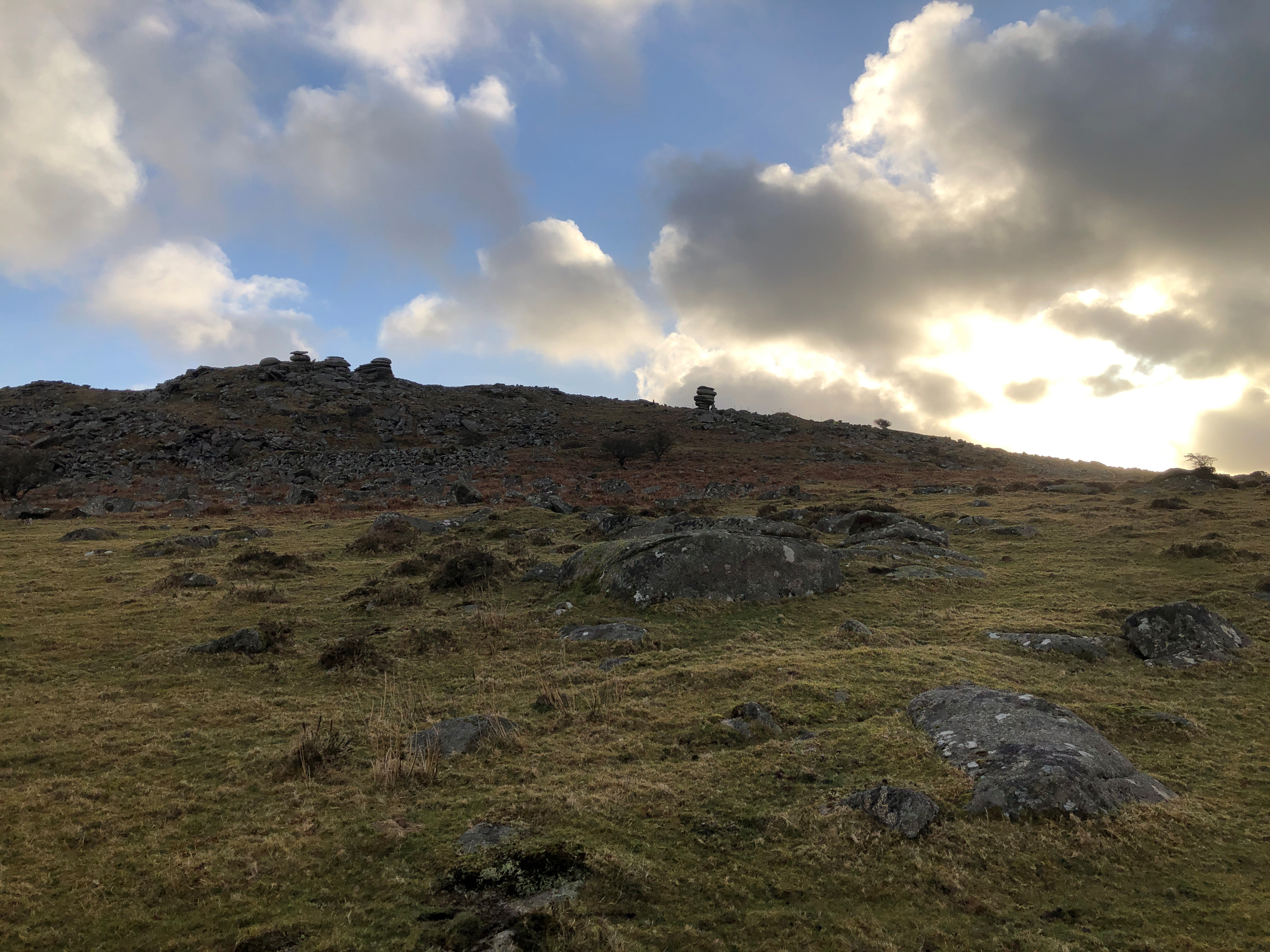
Stowe's Hill above Sharptor
