= Hydathode =

Water-secreting gland in plant leaf margins

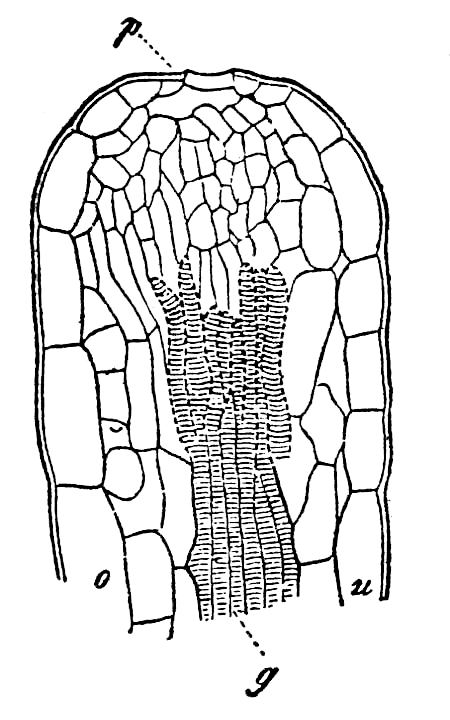
A section of hydathode in the leaf of Primula sinensis (Brockhaus and Efron Encyclopedic Dictionary)

A hydathode is a type of plant organ, commonly found in vascular plants, that secretes fluid through pores in the epidermis, usually at the tip or margin of a leaf. They are found in a wide variety of plants, from aquatic plants to ferns to flowering trees, where they play a primary role in guttation. Hydathodes help plants regulate fluid balance and filter nutrients, functioning somewhat like kidneys in leaves. They can also serve as entry points for pathogenic bacteria.

== Discovery and etymology ==
Initially observed and reported in 1877 by Anton de Bary, a German botanist, hydathodes were originally called "water pores." Later, between 1895 and 1897, Austrian botanist Gottlieb Haberlandt proposed the modern name combining the Greek words hydat (water) and hodos (way/road). Haberlandt later went on to describe the anatomy of hydathodes in greater detail in the third edition of his cornerstone book Physiological Plant Anatomy, differentiating them from simpler openings which are not actively involved in guttation.

== Structure and function ==
Hydathodes are composed of a group of cells spanning from the epidermal layer to the xylem vessels. They are primarily composed of modified bundle-end cells with few or no chloroplasts called the epithem. The epithem is found directly below the epidermis and is composed of thin-walled parenchyma which connect to the plant xylem via a dense network of tracheid cells. The epithem cells open out into one or more sub-epidermal chambers. These, in turn, communicate with the exterior through an open water stoma or water pore. The water pore structurally resembles an ordinary stoma, but is usually larger and has lost the power of movement (is permanently open).

Hydathodes are involved in the process of guttation, in which positive xylem pressure (due to root pressure) causes liquid to exude from the water pores. This process generally occurs at night. Guttation fluid can be taken up again by the plant as it sits on the underside of the leaf.

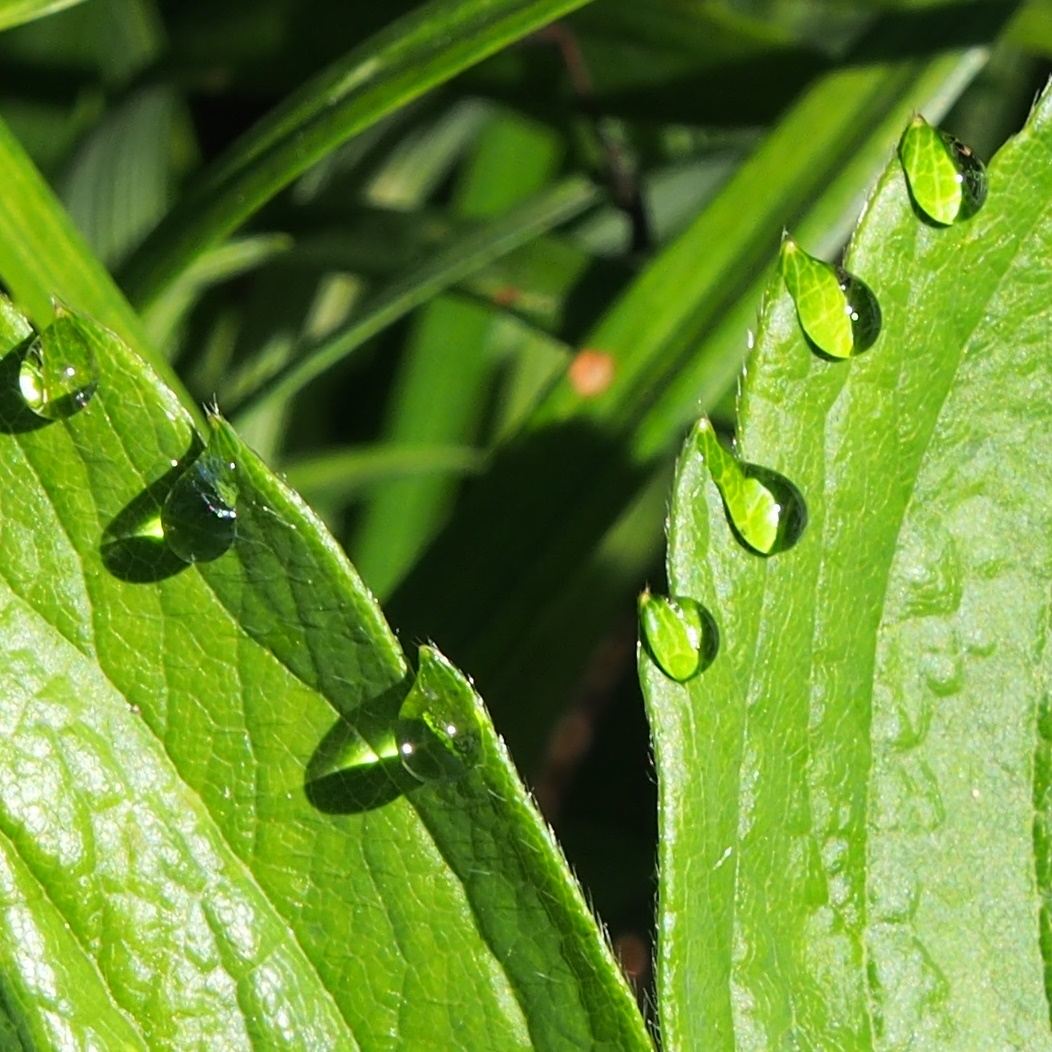
Guttation droplets on strawberry. Guttation occurs at the hydathodes.

Beyond their role in guttation, hydathodes also help regulate the composition of the xylem stream. Analyses of guttation fluid reveal a complex mixture of mineral ions, amino acids, sugars, vitamins and pathogenesis-related proteins, usually at lower concentrations than in the bulk sap. Additionally, transporter transcripts for phosphate, potassium, chloride and various organic solutes are highly expressed in the epithem, implying active retrieval before loss. The structure therefore functions like a kidney: excess water and undesirable solutes are released, while nutrients can be reclaimed, maintaining leaf osmotic balance and preventing mesophyll flooding when transpiration is low.

In one outlying case, hydathodes of plants in the succulent genus Crassula are utilized for the uptake of water, rather than just the exudation of water through guttation. This phenomenon appears widespread among Crassula, but has yet to be documented outside this genus.

== Occurrence and development ==
=== Occurrence in vascular plants ===
Hydathodes occur across most groups of vascular plants, from horsetails and ferns to flowering herbs and trees. They also occur in the leaves of submerged aquatic plants such as Ranunculus fluitans as well as herbaceous plants of drier habitats such as Campanula rotundifolia. Among different plants, hydathodes vary in structure with some having less-developed epithem tissue and others having a fully developed epithem. Some aquatic vascular plants lack hydathode pores entirely and instead have simple apical openings in lieu of true hydathodes.

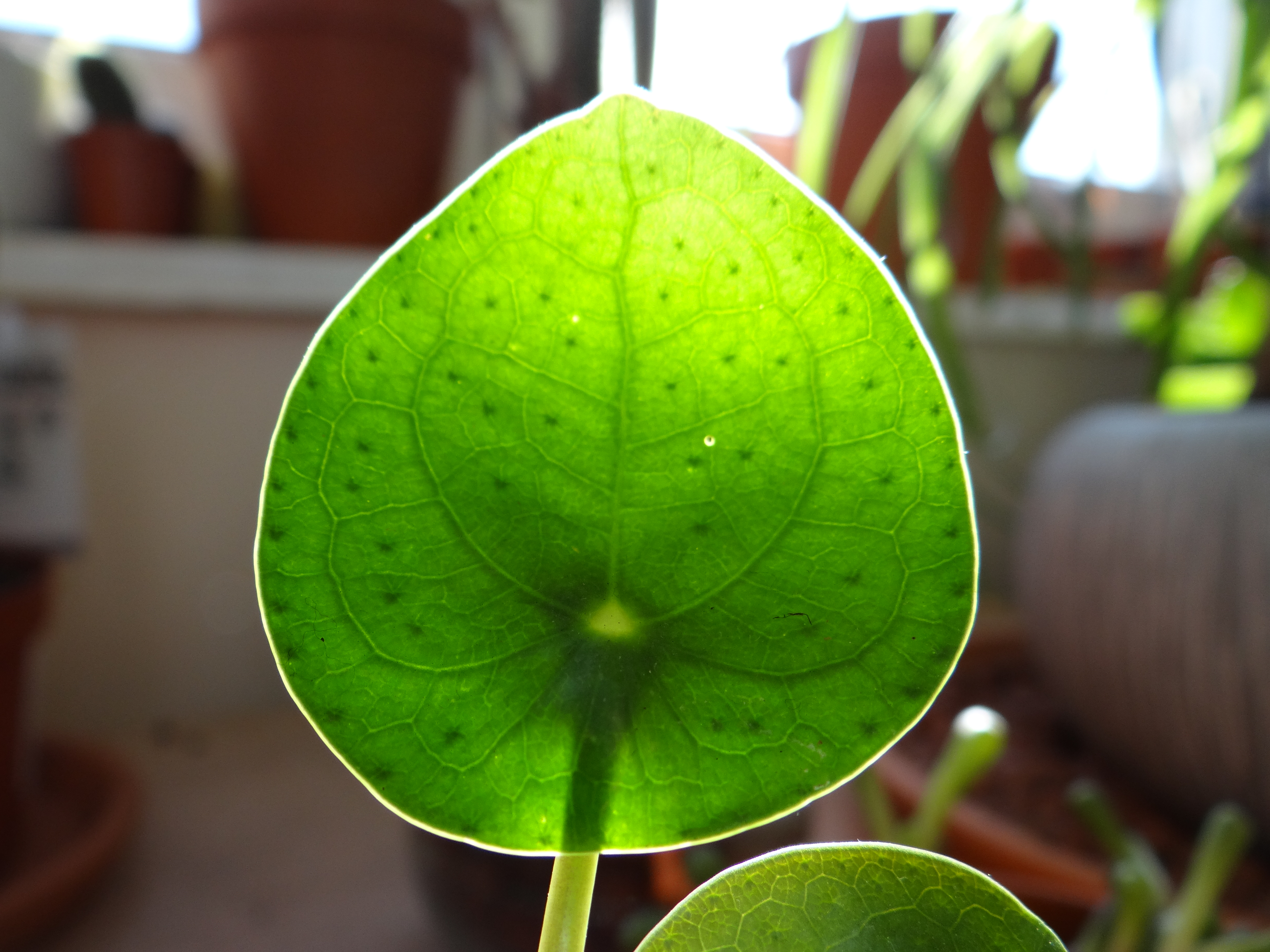
Close-up of a leaf of the houseplant Pilea peperomioides. The dark dots are the sites of hydathodes.

Though hydathodes are often found at the leaf tip or margin, they can also found on the leaf surface, such as on the underside of the leaf of the common houseplant, Pilea peperomioides (at right) and occasionally on the tendrils and coleoptiles of other plants. Hydathodes are typically categorized by their location on the leaf: those found at the leaf tip are called apical hydathodes, those at the leaf margin are called marginal hydathodes, and those found distributed on the leaf surface are called laminar hydathodes.

Most, if not all, all monocots have apical hydathodes, including grasses, such as Oryza sativa (rice) and the model organism Brachypodium distachyon, as well as aroids, such as Colocasia esculenta (taro). Some monocots also possess marginal hydathodes, including Zea mays (maize). Dicots, on the other hand, are more varied in the types of hydathodes they possess. Laminar hydathodes, for example, appear to be unique to a small selection of dicots, including the genera Crassula and Ficus and the species Myrothamnus flabellifolius and Pilea peperomioides. Dicots in general may have either apical hydathodes, marginal hydathodes, laminar hydathodes or a combination of two types.

=== Development ===
Research using Arabidopsis thaliana (a common laboratory plant) has shown that hydathodes form very early as leaves develop, appearing at predetermined spots along the leaf edges where plant hormones are most concentrated. Work in Arabidopsis also suggests that the pores of hydathodes share a common identity with stomatal guard cells, though functionally the two are differentiated. Hydathode water pores lack the machinery for full closure and display only a limited response to abscisic acid or darkness, unlike stomata. Mutations in genes known to be implicated in the development of stomata often cause similar effects in both stomata and the water pores of hydathodes, further suggesting a link in their developmental origin.

Auxin accumulation and distribution has been implicated as a potential candidate for the condition responsible for the differentiation of hydathodes and hydathode pores during leaf development. In Arabidopsis, polar auxin transport contributes to leaf margin growth and hydathode formation via the proteins PIN1 and CUC2. YUCCA-mediated auxin biosynthesis is also implicated in hydathode formation. The PIN1 and CUC2 auxin dynamic hypothesis has additionally been studied for its role in vein pattern formation around laminar hydathodes in Pilea peperomioides.

The development of hydathodes in plants is not well-studied and is often dependent on indirect evidence from research on the development of Arabidopsis marginal hydathodes. Hydathodes do not appear often in the literature, and much recent research is centered on their role in plant defense and pathogen entry. Thus, the mechanism of their development remains understudied.

== Plant defense and pathogen entry ==
Because water pores provide a nearly direct path from the external environment to the plant's vascular system, hydathodes also form a natural breach in the leaf's defenses. Upon guttation or the reuptake of guttation fluid, bacterial pathogens such as Xanthomonas campestris (black-rot of cabbages), Xanthomonas oryzae (rice leaf blight) and Clavibacter michiganensis (tomato canker) can enter through water pores, establish in the epithem and then spread systemically. Plants respond with reactive oxygen bursts, lignification of the epithem and secretion of antimicrobial proteins into the guttation droplets, but virulent strains of bacteria can deploy effectors to suppress these responses. Consequently, the evolutionary conservation of hydathodes represents a trade-off: they are essential for water management yet constitute a favored ingress route for vascular pathogens.

In addition to lignification, browning, and secretion of antimicrobial proteins to control infections at hydathodes, plants also employ hydathodes themselves as sites of preventative immunity. Studies in Arabidopsis suggest that hydathodes act as immune barriers which confine and halt the growth of bacterial pathogens. Similar observations have also been made in cauliflower. In this context, hydathodes are the location in which the plant immune system recognizes pathogens and prevents their systemic spread. The mechanism by which the plant halts pathogen growth and prevents infection is currently unknown, however.
