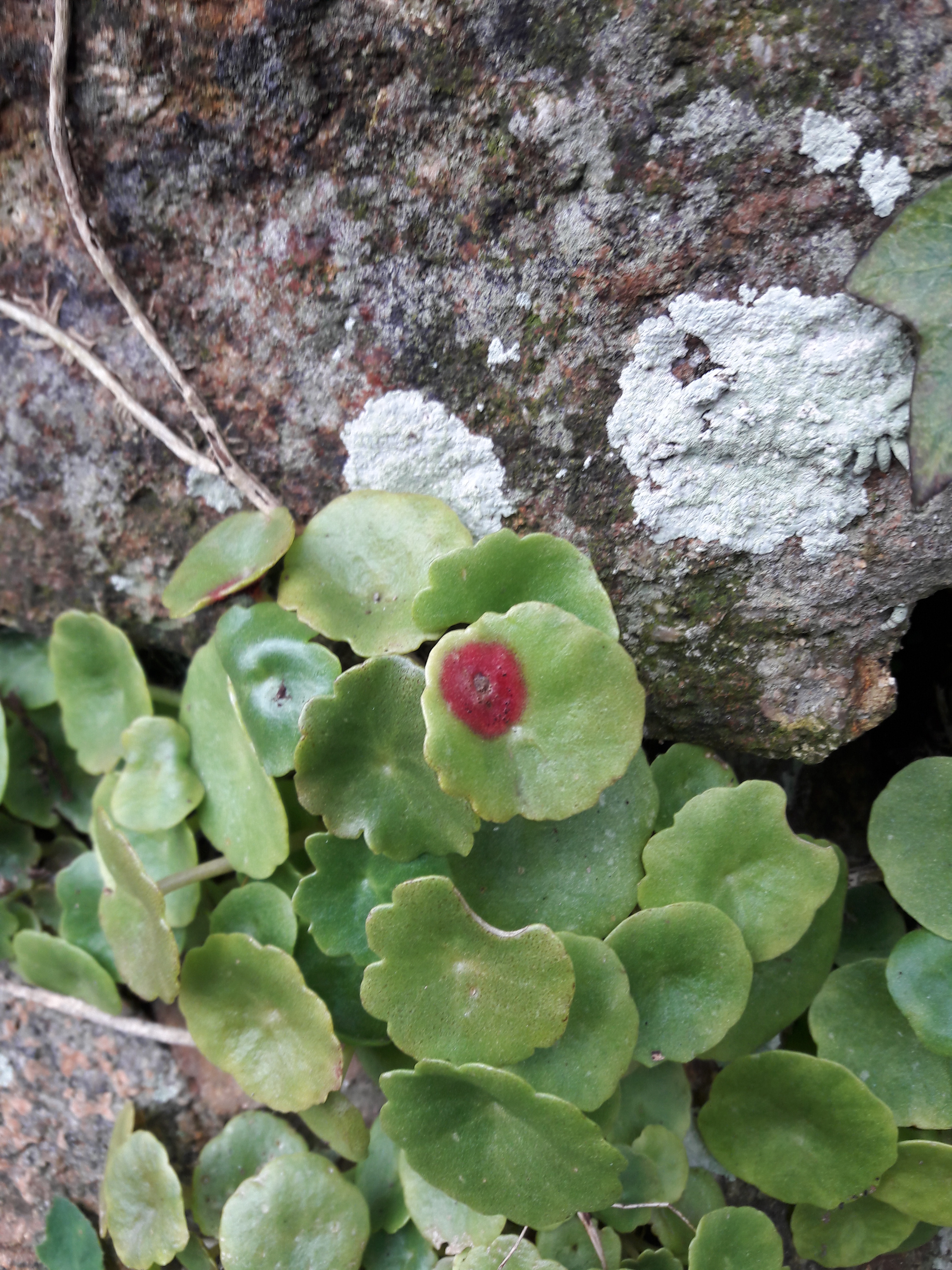

Scientific classification
- Domain: Eukaryota
- Kingdom: Fungi
- Division: Basidiomycota
- Class: Pucciniomycetes
- Order: Pucciniales
- Family: Pucciniaceae
- Genus: Puccinia
- Species: P. umbilici

Binomial name
- Puccinia umbilici Guépin, 1830

Synonyms
- List: Puccinia rhodiolae Berkeley & Broome, 1850; Puccinia cotyledonis Duby; Puccinia umbilici Duby; Puccinia rhodiolae Berk. & Broome

= Puccinia umbilici =

Species of fungus

Puccinia umbilici is a fungal plant pathogen which causes rust on navelwort (Umbilicus rupestris). It was originally found on the leaves of Umbilicus pendulinus in France. It is found in Europe, Japan, Russia and the United States.
