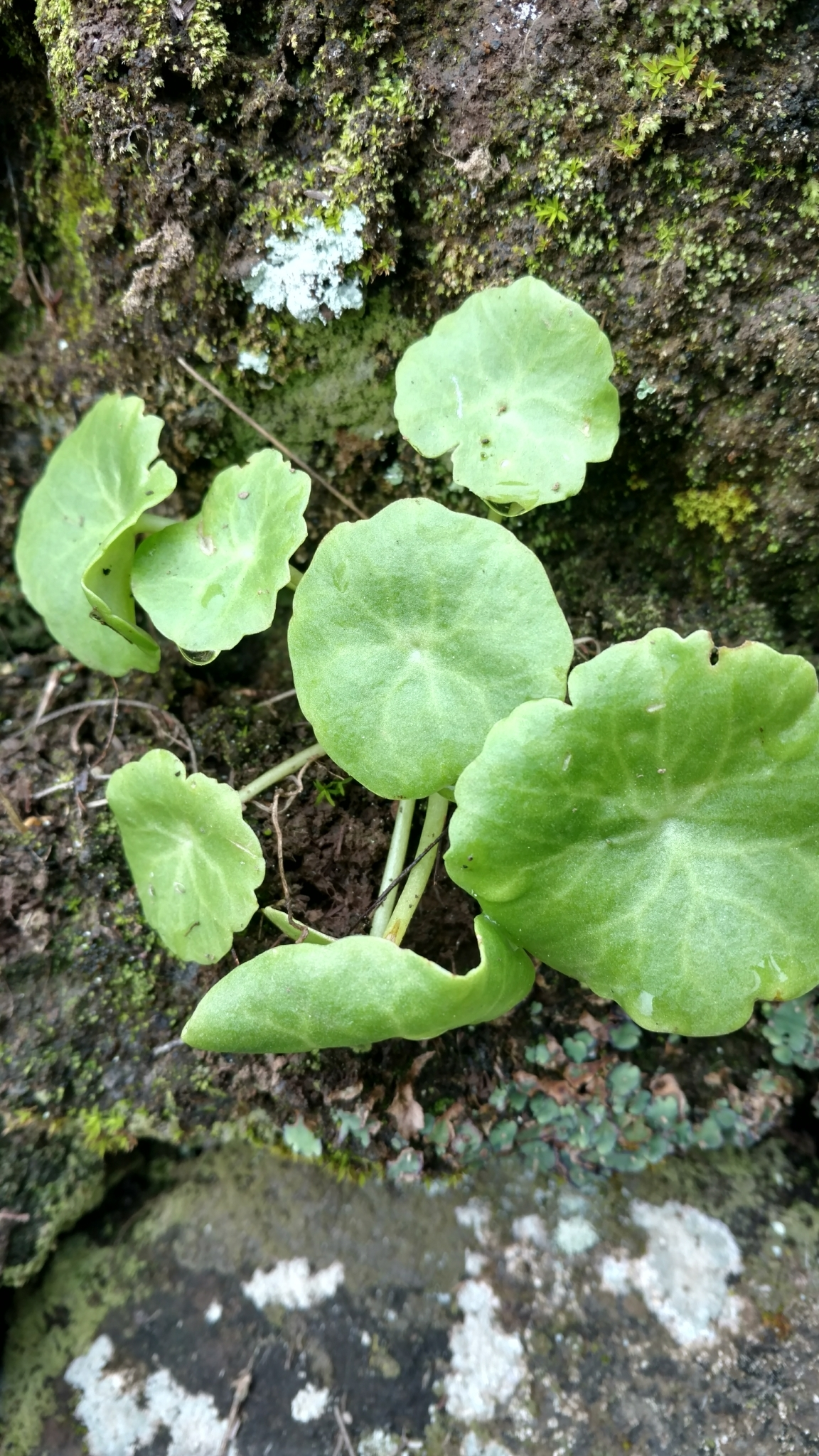

Conservation status
- Endangered (IUCN 3.1)

Scientific classification
- Kingdom: Plantae
- Clade: Tracheophytes
- Clade: Angiosperms
- Clade: Eudicots
- Order: Saxifragales
- Family: Crassulaceae
- Genus: Umbilicus
- Species: U. schmidtii

Binomial name
- Umbilicus schmidtii Bolle, 1859

= Umbilicus schmidtii =

Species of succulent

Umbilicus schmidtii is a flowering plant in the family Crassulaceae. The species is endemic to Cape Verde. It is listed as endangered by the IUCN.

== Description ==
Umbilicus schmidtii is an unbranched erect perennial herb up to 25 cm high, glabrous in all parts. Basal leaves orbicular, peltate, up to 6 cm in diameter, somewhat succulent, margin slightly crenate to almost entire, petioles long. Cauline leaves smaller, shortly petiolated to almost sessile. Inflorescence long many flowered terminal raceme. Calyx much shorter than the corolla. Corolla brownish yellow, tubular; lobes short, lanceolate, acuminate.

== Related taxa ==
The species is fairy similar to the Mediterranean Umbilicus horizontalis and also resembles the African U. botryoides. The taxonomic significance of U. schmidtii is uncertain.

== Distribution and ecology ==
Umbilicus scmidtii is a western hygrophyte occurring on Santo Antão, São Nicolau, Santiago and Fogo of the Cape Verde Islands. It is confined to small areas in the subhumid and humid zones, mainly between 800 m and 1600 m. The lower most records are 550 m on Fogo (Monte Palha, leg. Killian & Leyens) and at 600 m on Santo Antao (Sunding 1981) and the uppermost one at 2000 m on Fogo (Ormonde 1977). The plants grow on north to northeast facing, moist cliffs. Umbilicus schmidtii is infrequent even in suitable habitats and it is generally considered to be rare.

== The genus ==
Umbilicus comprises 18 species of annual and perennial herbs with a characteristic foliage. The genus is distributed from the mid-Atlantic archipelagos, W Europe, the Mediterranean to Iran. It also occurs in some African mountains. In the Cape Verde Islands, the genus is represented by a single species described as endemic to the archipelago.
