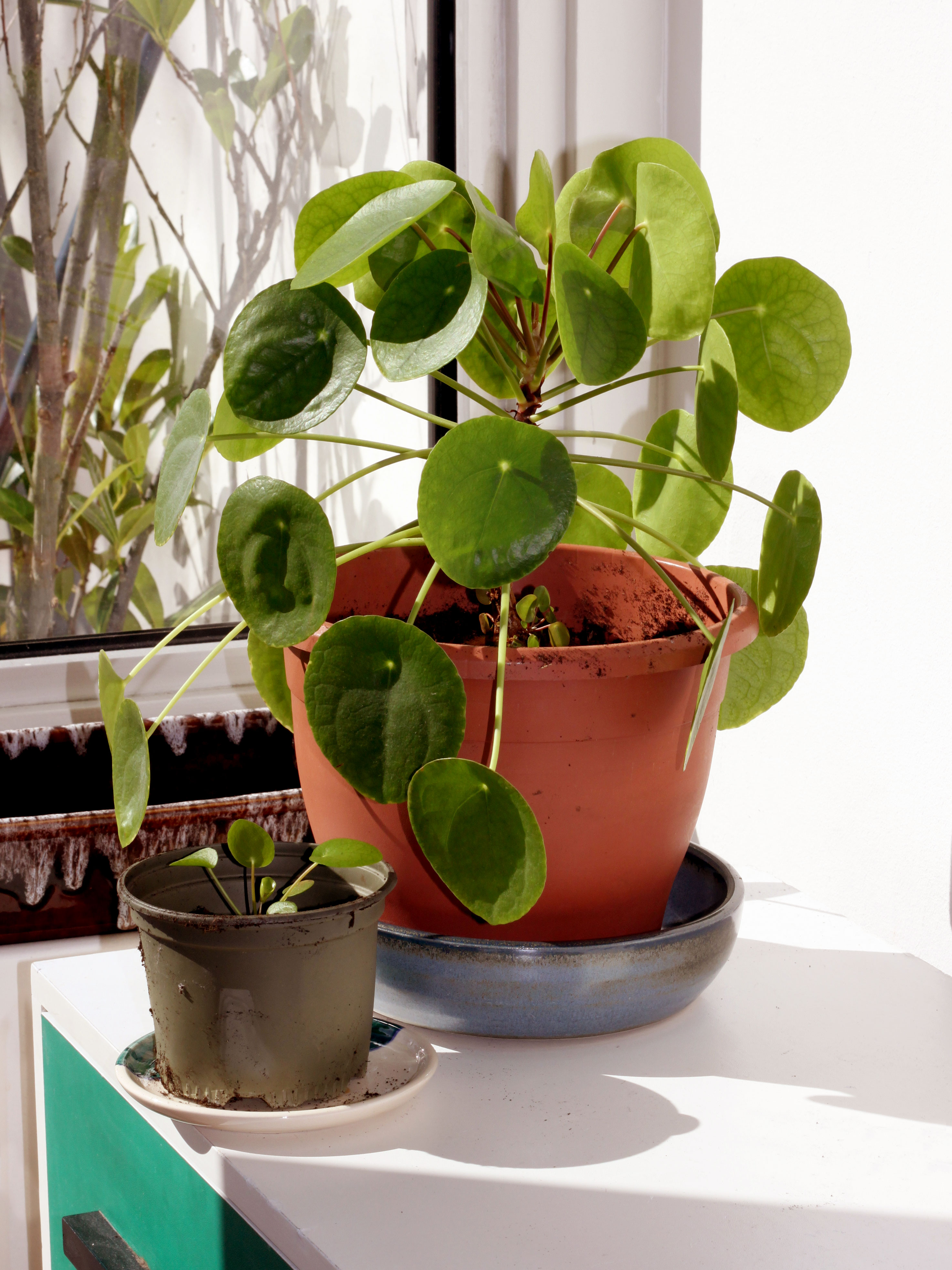
- Pilea peperomioides and offspring

Scientific classification
- Kingdom: Plantae
- Clade: Embryophytes
- Clade: Tracheophytes
- Clade: Spermatophytes
- Clade: Angiosperms
- Clade: Eudicots
- Clade: Rosids
- Order: Rosales
- Family: Urticaceae
- Genus: Pilea
- Species: P. peperomioides

Binomial name
- Pilea peperomioides Diels, 1912

= Pilea peperomioides =

Species of plant

Pilea peperomioides (/paɪˈliːə pɛpəˌroʊmiˈɔɪdiːz/), the Chinese money plant, UFO plant, pancake plant, lefse plant or missionary plant, is a species of flowering plant in the nettle family Urticaceae, native to Yunnan and Sichuan provinces in southern China.

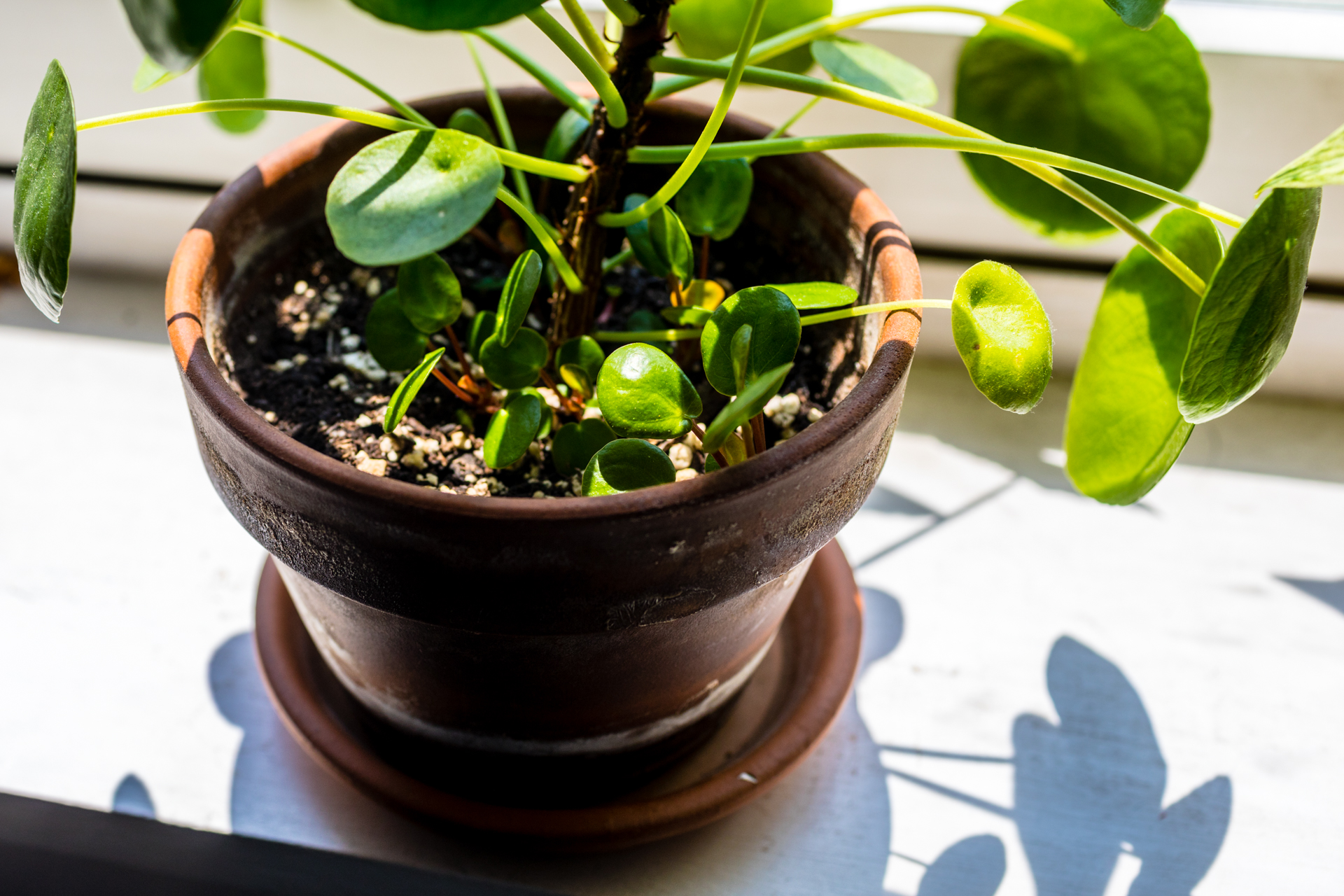
Pilea peperomioides and its pups

== History ==
The Scottish botanist George Forrest was the first westerner to collect Pilea peperomioides, in 1906 and again in 1910, in the Cang Mountain range in Yunnan Province.

In 1945, the species was found by Norwegian missionary Agnar Espegren in Yunnan Province when he was fleeing from Hunan Province. He took cuttings of P. peperomioides back to Norway, by way of India in 1946, and from there it was spread throughout Scandinavia.

Pilea peperomioides is an example of a plant that has been spread amongst amateur gardeners via cuttings, without being well known to western botanists until the late 20th century. This led to the plant earning the nickname of "friendship plant", or "pass-along plant". Many horticulturists and hobbyists were not aware of its true classification, in the nettle family Urticaceae, until the 1980s. The story of its identity and discovery in Western cultivation, along with its first published image, was detailed by Alan Radcliffe-Smith in 1984, and later in a more popular account by Phillip Cribb and Leonard Forman in 1987. Through the early 2010s and 2020s, P. peperomioides became widely available commercially, and is no longer a curiosity. The initial offerings for sale on the mainstream plant market saw great demand for the plant, with prices going as high as US$75 for a single unrooted cutting, advertised on Instagram, as late as 2019.

== Description ==
Pilea peperomioides is an erect, evergreen perennial plant, with shiny, dark green, circular leaves up to 10 cm (4 in) in diameter on long petioles. The leaves are described as peltate—circular, with the petiole attached near the centre. The plant is completely hairless. It grows to around 30 cm (12 in) tall and wide in the wild. Indoors, it has the potential to grow larger. The stem is greenish to dark brown, usually unbranched and upright, and lignified at the base when mature. In poor growing conditions, it loses its leaves in the lower part of the stem and assumes a distinctive habit. The flowers are inconspicuous. The species is monoecious. Male flowers are more common, and female flowers may not be produced.

The plant has a superficial resemblance to some species of Peperomia (hence the specific epithet peperomioides), also popular as cultivated plants but in a different family, the Piperaceae. It is also sometimes confused with other peltate-leaved plants such as Nasturtium, Umbilicus and Hydrocotyle.

== Range ==
This species occurs only in China: in the southwest of Sichuan province and the west of Yunnan province. It grows on shady, damp rocks in forests at altitudes from 1,500 to 3,000 m (4,900 to 9,800 ft). It is endangered in its native habitat. However, it is kept in China and worldwide as an ornamental plant.

== Cultivation ==
In temperate regions, P. peperomioides is treated as a houseplant, with cultivation recommended at a minimum temperature anywhere from 13 °C (55 °F) to 5 °C (41 °F). However, in its native range, the plant tolerates periods near or below freezing. Thus the plant could be kept in unheated indoor areas or even outdoors in temperate climates; the foliage may be killed back by frost, but regrows in spring. Wessel Marais, the Kew Gardens botanist who determined the identity of the plant in the 1980s, later grew the plant outdoors in Cazillac, France. He reported it surviving for 6 or 7 years with temperatures as low as −9 °C (16 °F), noting that "the stems above ground are killed but it comes again from below ground-level, so deep planting should do the trick".

P. peperomioides is propagated from plantlets that sprout on the trunk of the parent plant (these are called offshoots) or from underground shoots (called rhizomes). These offshoots are often passed on as a lucky plant ("lucky thaler") or friendship plant. Since constant temperatures and high humidity have a positive effect on plant growth, this plant species is suitable for planting terrariums.

Although the plant is endangered in its native habitat, it is among the most popular houseplants today. It is in high demand because it is slim, easy to grow, and tolerates dry environments. The plant is readily available in retail greenhouses, which in turn are supplied by industrial-scale farming enterprises.

This species has gained the Royal Horticultural Society's Award of Garden Merit.

There are three different cultivars which have appeared in the last few years 'Sugar', 'White Splash' and 'Mojito'.

== Propagation ==
P. peperomioides is propagated through divisions and stem cuttings.

Stem cuttings in Pilea peperomioides are often confused with leaf cuttings, as the propagation technique requires slicing off a leaf of the mother plant; however, the cutting must take place at the stem and include stem tissue for successful propagation. Hence it is technically a stem cutting not a leaf cutting.

== See also ==
- Hydrocotyle vulgaris, a similar looking plant
- Peperomia polybotrya, or raindrop plant, often sold as P. peperomioides
- Umbilicus rupestris, a succulent of similar appearance
