= Navelwort =

Navelwort is a common name for two different plant genera:-

- Omphalodes
- Umbilicus
