= Umbilicus chloranthus =

Scientific classification
- Kingdom: Plantae
- Clade: Tracheophytes
- Clade: Angiosperms
- Clade: Eudicots
- Order: Saxifragales
- Family: Crassulaceae
- Genus: Umbilicus
- Species: U. chloranthus

Binomial name
- Umbilicus chloranthus Heldr. & Sart. ex Boiss.

Synonyms
- Cotyledon chlorantha (Heldr. & Sart. ex Boiss.) Halácsy

Species of plant in the stonecrop family

Umbilicus chloranthus is a species of flowering plant in the Crassulaceae family. It is referred to by the common names green Venus' navel and ombelico di Venere verdastro. It is native to Albania, the East Aegean Islands, Greece, Turkey, and Yugoslavia.
