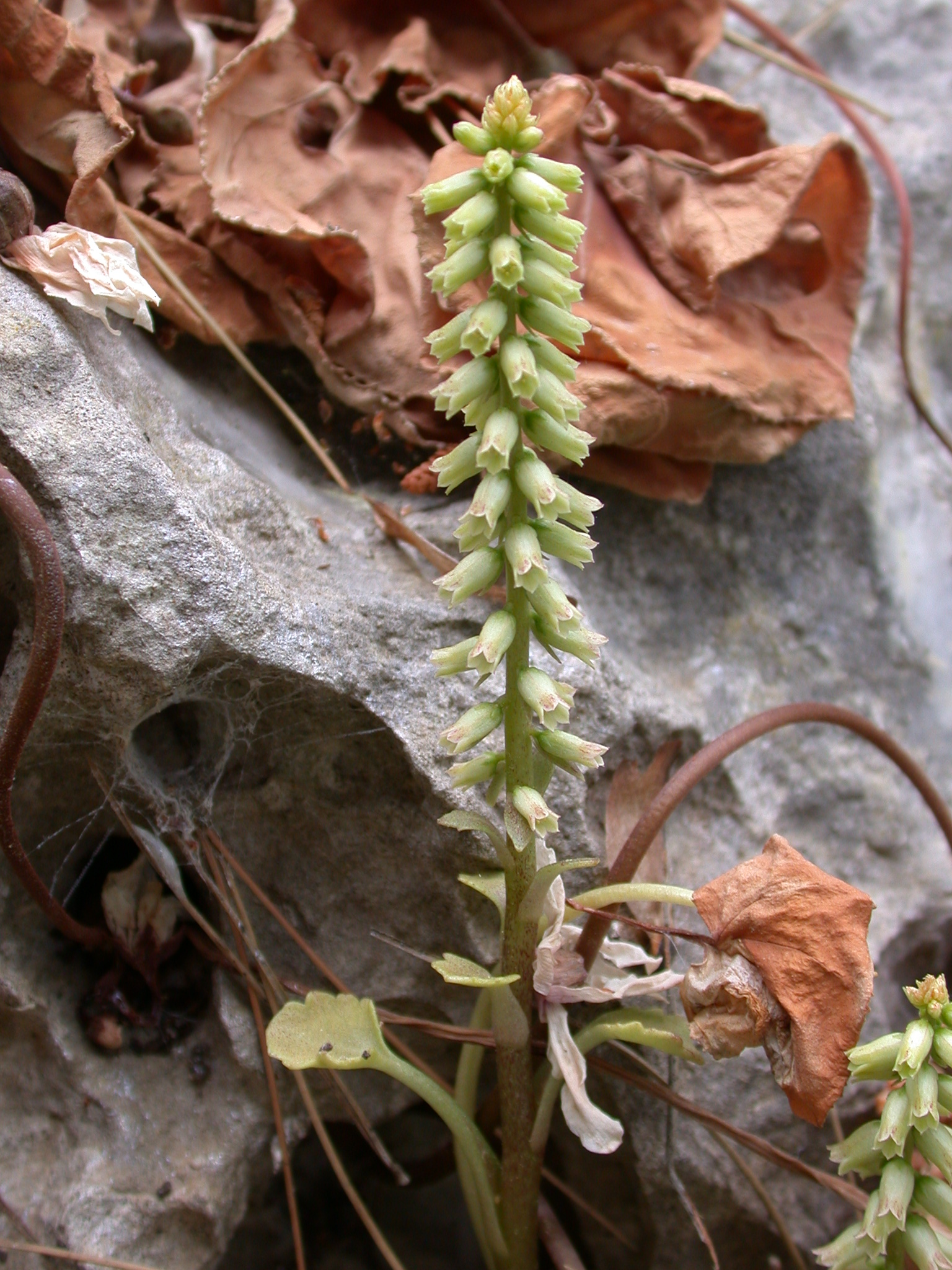

Scientific classification
- Kingdom: Plantae
- Clade: Embryophytes
- Clade: Tracheophytes
- Clade: Angiosperms
- Clade: Eudicots
- Order: Saxifragales
- Family: Crassulaceae
- Genus: Umbilicus
- Species: U. intermedius

Binomial name
- Umbilicus intermedius Boiss.

Synonyms
- Cotyledon intermedius (Boiss.) Bornm. Umbilicus horizontalis var. intermedius (Boiss.) D.F.Chamb. Umbilicus lineolatus Boiss.

= Umbilicus intermedius =

Species of flowering plant

Umbilicus intermedius, the intermediate navelwort or common pennywort, is a succulent, perennial flowering plant in the stonecrop family Crassulaceae found in the shrublands and deserts of Israel and Lebanon.

== Description ==
Intermediate navelwort grows to an average of 25 cm (10 in) high. The palid spikes of bell-shaped, greenish-pink flowers of this plant first appear between March and June. The plant grows on shady walls or in damp rock crevices that are sparse in other plant growth, where its succulent leaves develop in rosettes.

The leaves, when boiled, are said to help urinary tract infections.
