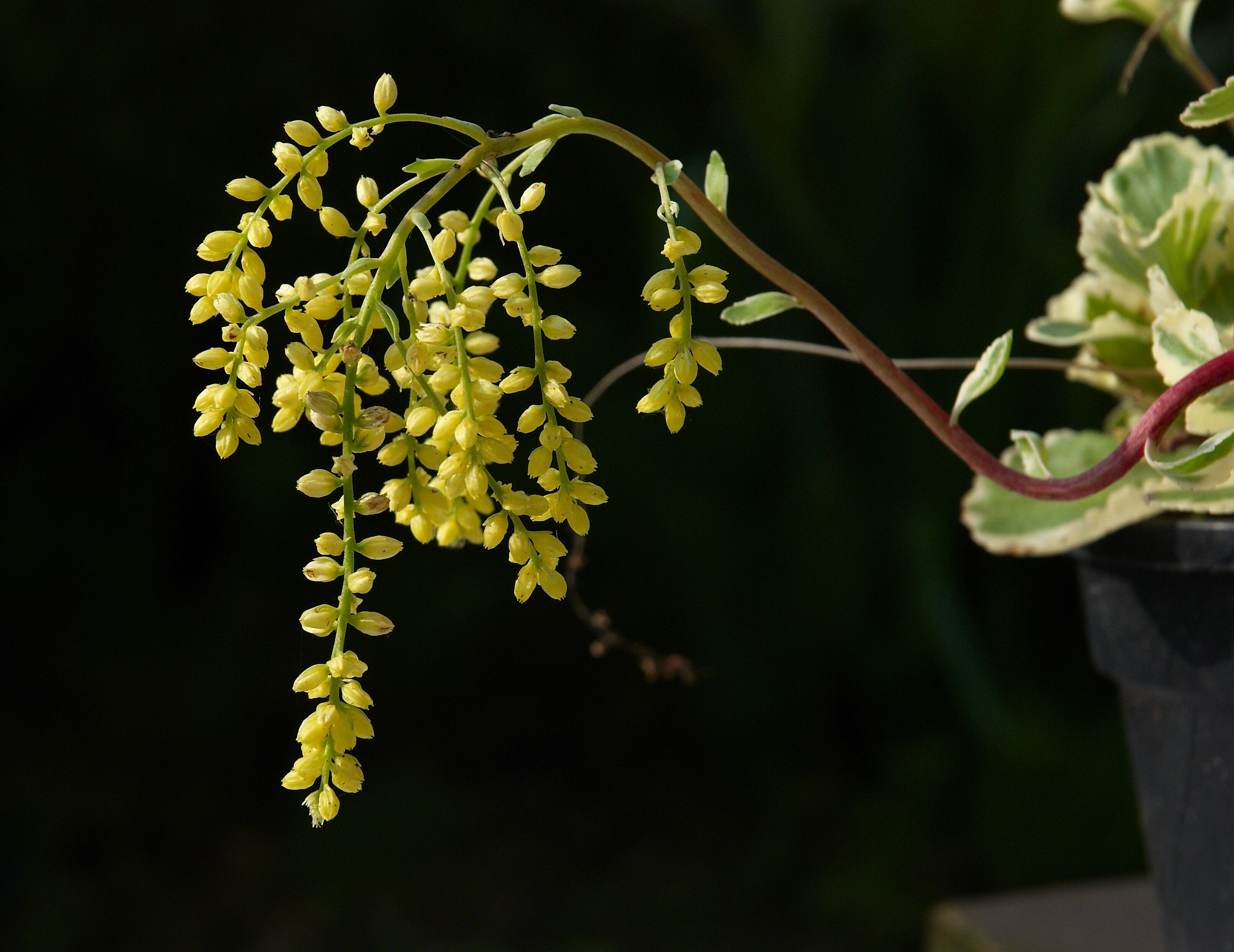
- In bud

Scientific classification
- Kingdom: Plantae
- Clade: Tracheophytes
- Clade: Angiosperms
- Clade: Eudicots
- Order: Saxifragales
- Family: Crassulaceae
- Genus: Umbilicus
- Species: U. oppositifolius

Binomial name
- Umbilicus oppositifolius Ledeb.

Synonyms
- Chiastophyllum oppositifolium

= Umbilicus oppositifolius =

Species of succulent

Umbilicus oppositifolius, common names lamb's-tail and gold drop, is a succulent, perennial flowering plant, a species in the genus Umbilicus of the family Crassulaceae. It is endemic to shady mountain areas in the Caucasus.

It is widely listed under its synonym Chiastophyllum oppositifolium.

It is a hardy, prostrate evergreen growing to 25 cm (10 in) with large fleshy leaves and racemes of tiny, sulphur-yellow flowers.

It has gained the Royal Horticultural Society's Award of Garden Merit.
