= Umbilicus chrysanthus =

Scientific classification
- Kingdom: Plantae
- Clade: Embryophytes
- Clade: Tracheophytes
- Clade: Spermatophytes
- Clade: Angiosperms
- Clade: Eudicots
- Order: Saxifragales
- Family: Crassulaceae
- Genus: Umbilicus
- Species: U. chrysanthus

Binomial name
- Umbilicus chrysanthus Boiss. and Heldr.

Species of succulent

Umbilicus chrysanthus is known for its wide umbilicus. It is a genus of more than 90 species of plants in the family Crassulaceae and its various species have many synonyms. The species may be known as Rosularia or Chiastophyllum.
