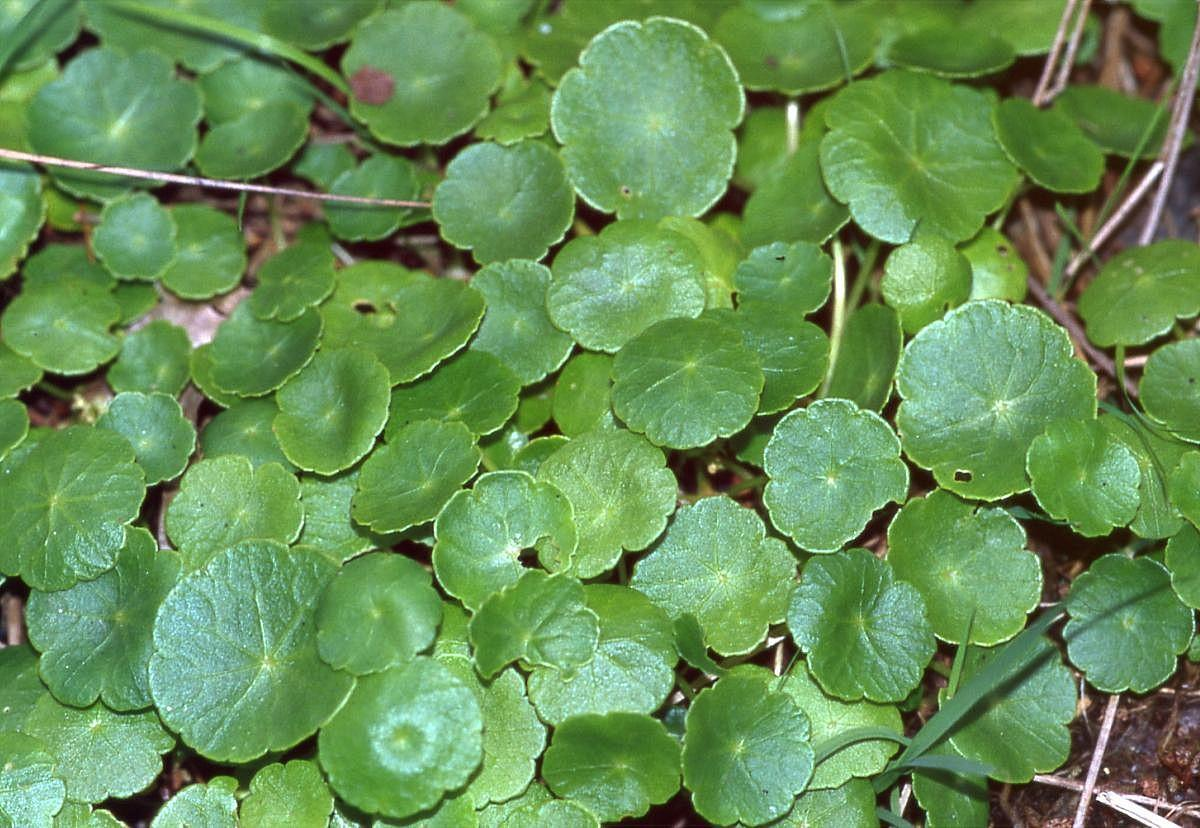

Conservation status
- Least Concern (IUCN 3.1)

Scientific classification
- Kingdom: Plantae
- Clade: Tracheophytes
- Clade: Angiosperms
- Clade: Eudicots
- Clade: Asterids
- Order: Apiales
- Family: Araliaceae
- Genus: Hydrocotyle
- Species: H. vulgaris

Binomial name
- Hydrocotyle vulgaris L.

= Hydrocotyle vulgaris =

Species of flowering plant

Hydrocotyle vulgaris, the marsh pennywort, common pennywort, water naval, money plant, lucky plant, dollarweed or copper coin, is a small creeping aquatic perennial plant native to North Africa, Europe, the Caucasus and parts of the Levant.

== Description ==
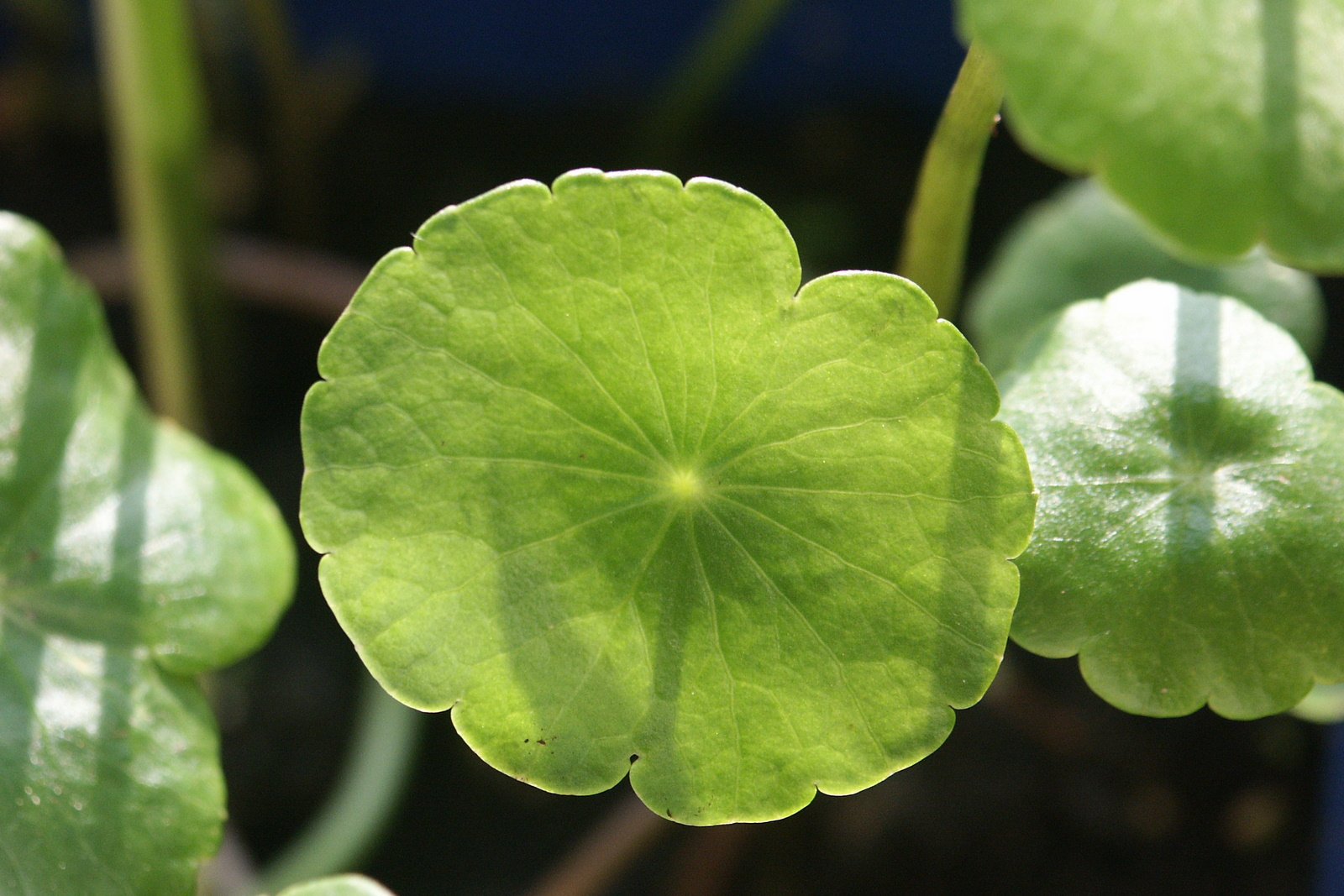
Shield-shaped leaf

The plant has an umbrella-like leaf and lives commonly in wet places such as wetlands, marshes and swamps, sometimes even in deeper water. It grows as a perennial herbaceous plant and only reaches stature heights of 5 to 20 centimeters. With a slight smell of carrot, it is edible.

This marsh plant forms numerous, up to 1 meter long, creeping offshoots. The serrated, rounded, shield-shaped leaves can have a diameter of up to 4 centimeters, but are often smaller. The approach of the long, hairy petioles is located in the middle of the leaf underside. The leaves are fresh green, shiny waxy and shows a clear, radially extending vein.

The tiny, inconspicuous, hermaphrodite flowers are in low-flowered doldigen? inflorescences or whorls, with the stems of the inflorescence about half as long as those of the leaves. The petals are greenish, white or reddish. The flowering period is from July to August. The fruits are flat, warty and winged.

== Cultivation ==
A low maintenance plant, it prefers to grow in reliably moist humus under a full sun or in part shade, indoors or outdoors, though it can tolerate full shade as well. It may also be grown as an aquatic plant in mud at the side of a pond or water garden in up to 2 inches of stagnant water. Despite its habitat in water, over-watering may still cause root rot.

== Population ==
The plant is distributed and plentiful throughout much of its range in Europe, North Africa and Western Asia. Nonetheless, it is classed as critically endangered in Croatia, vulnerable in Switzerland and near threatened in Norway. Furthermore, the plant is protected under regional legislation in France.

== Ecology ==
In Britain it is the only native Hydrocotyle, growing in wet places such as fens, swamps, bogs and marshes. For example, it is a component of purple moor grass and rush pastures – a type of Biodiversity Action Plan habitat. The flowers rarely bloom; mostly self-pollination takes place. Vegetative propagation occurs through foothills. In wild plant gardens, the marsh pennywort is used for the planting of garden ponds, and also as aquarium plant.

== Gallery ==
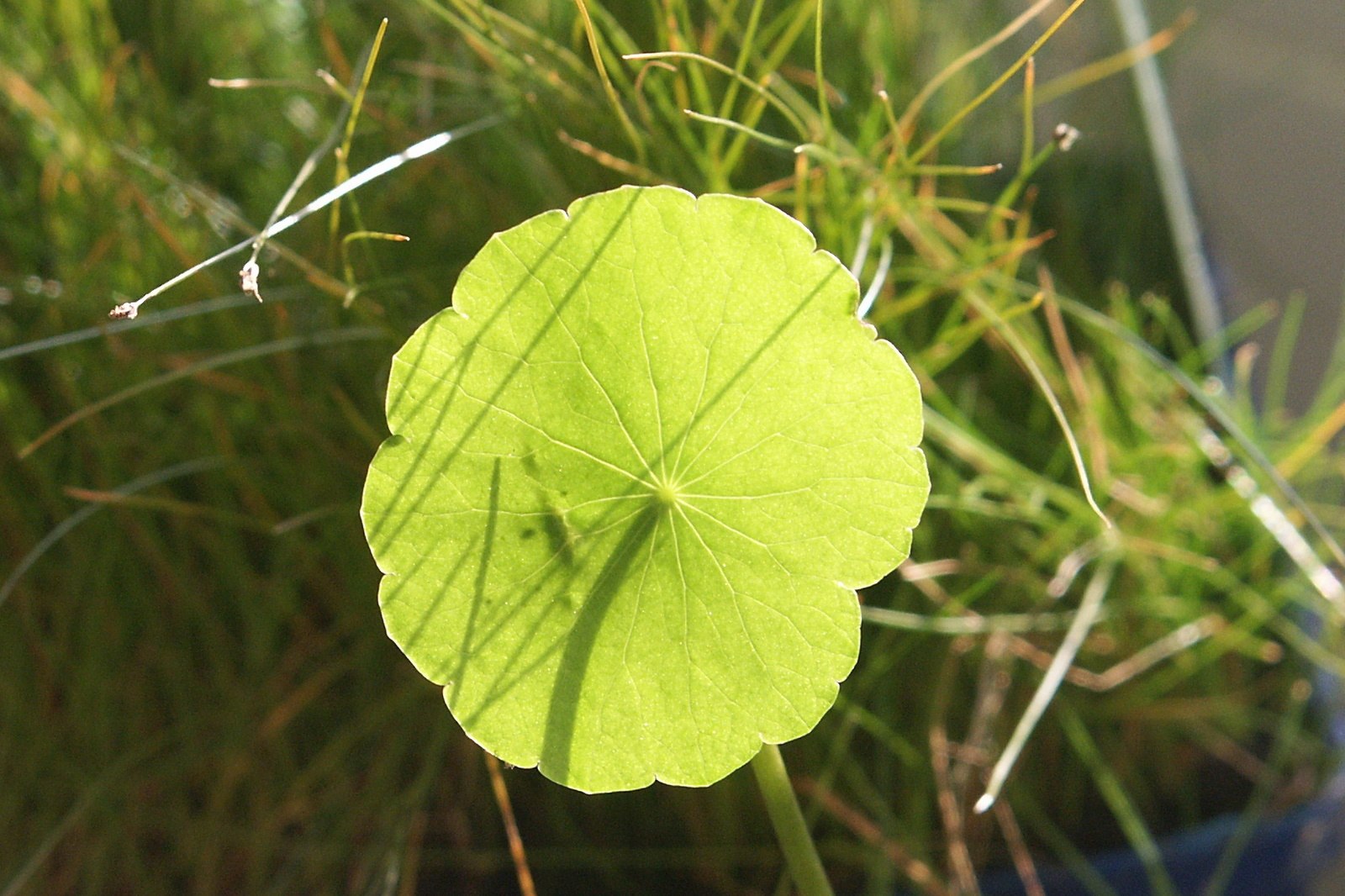
UFO-shaped leaf

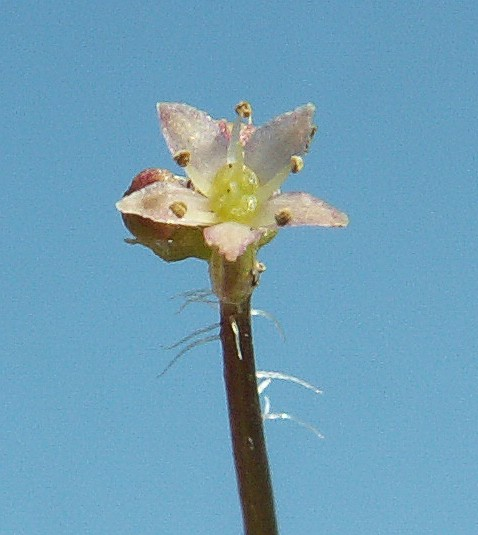
Flower

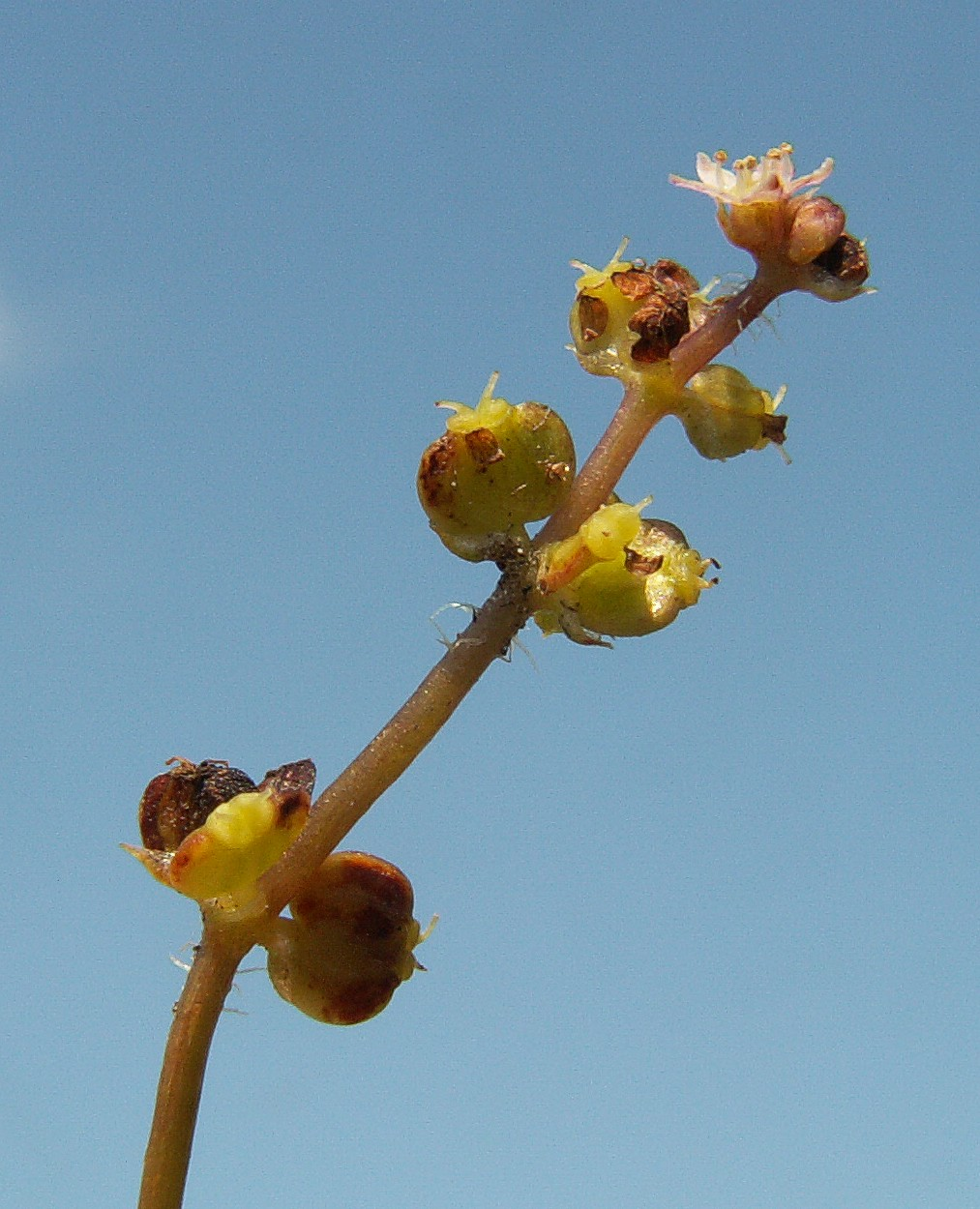
Inflorescence

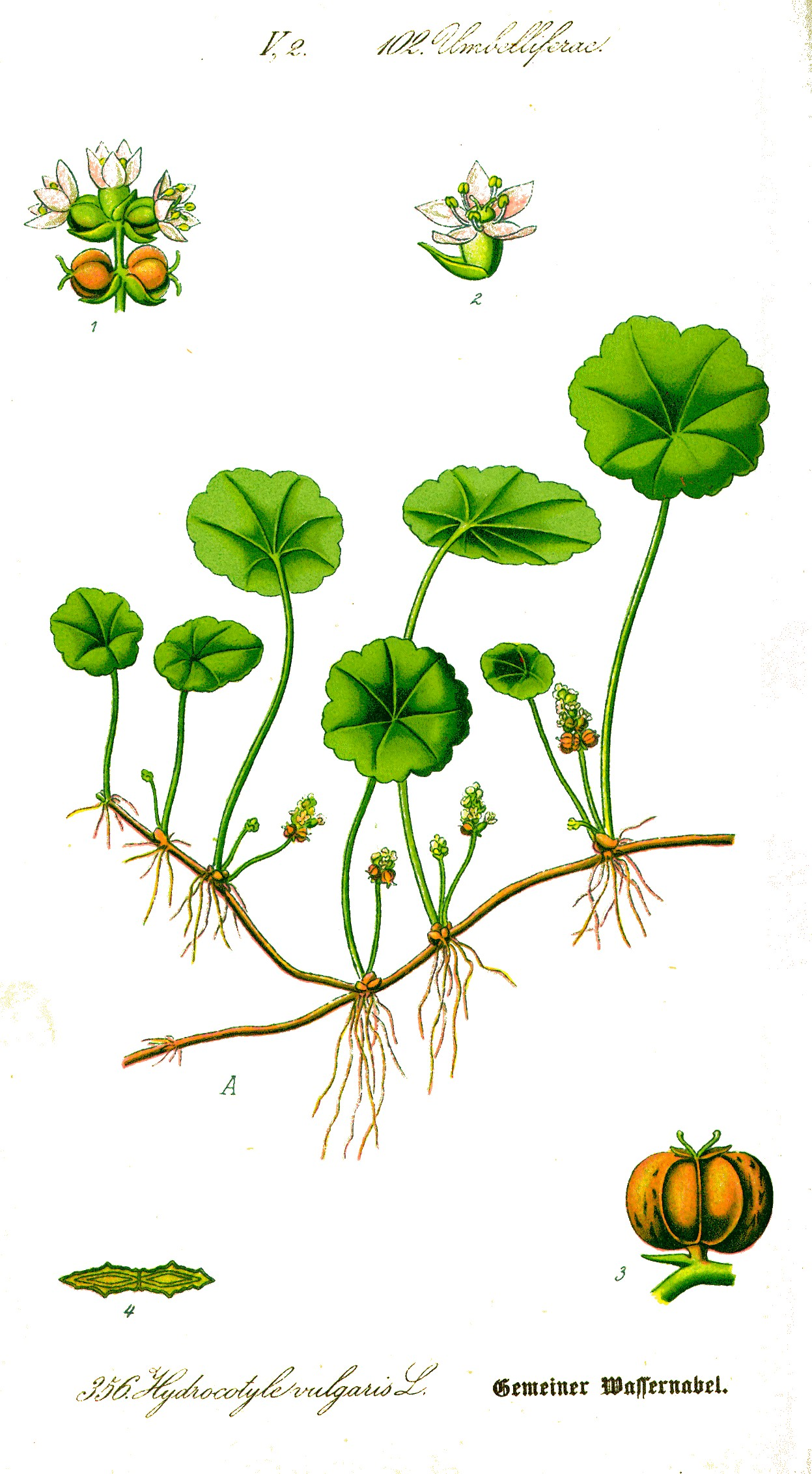
Botanical illustration by German botanist Otto Wilhelm Thomé

== See also ==
- Umbilicus rupestris, a similar looking succulent
- Pilea peperomioides, a similar looking rosales
