= Umbilicus luteus =

Reniform Venus' navel

Scientific classification
- Kingdom: Plantae
- Clade: Tracheophytes
- Clade: Angiosperms
- Clade: Eudicots
- Order: Saxifragales
- Family: Crassulaceae
- Genus: Umbilicus
- Species: U. l. (Huds.)

Binomial name
- Umbilicus luteus (Huds.) Huds.

Synonyms
- Umbilicus erectus DC.

Species of flowering plant

Umbilicus luteus, the reniform Venus' navel, is a succulent, perennial flowering plant in the family Crassulaceae, in the genus Umbilicus, found in the Southern Balkans and southern Italy.

Umbilicus luteus leaf extract had a highly virucidal effect to Acyclovir (ACV) resistant Herpes Simplex Virus Type 1 in vitro
