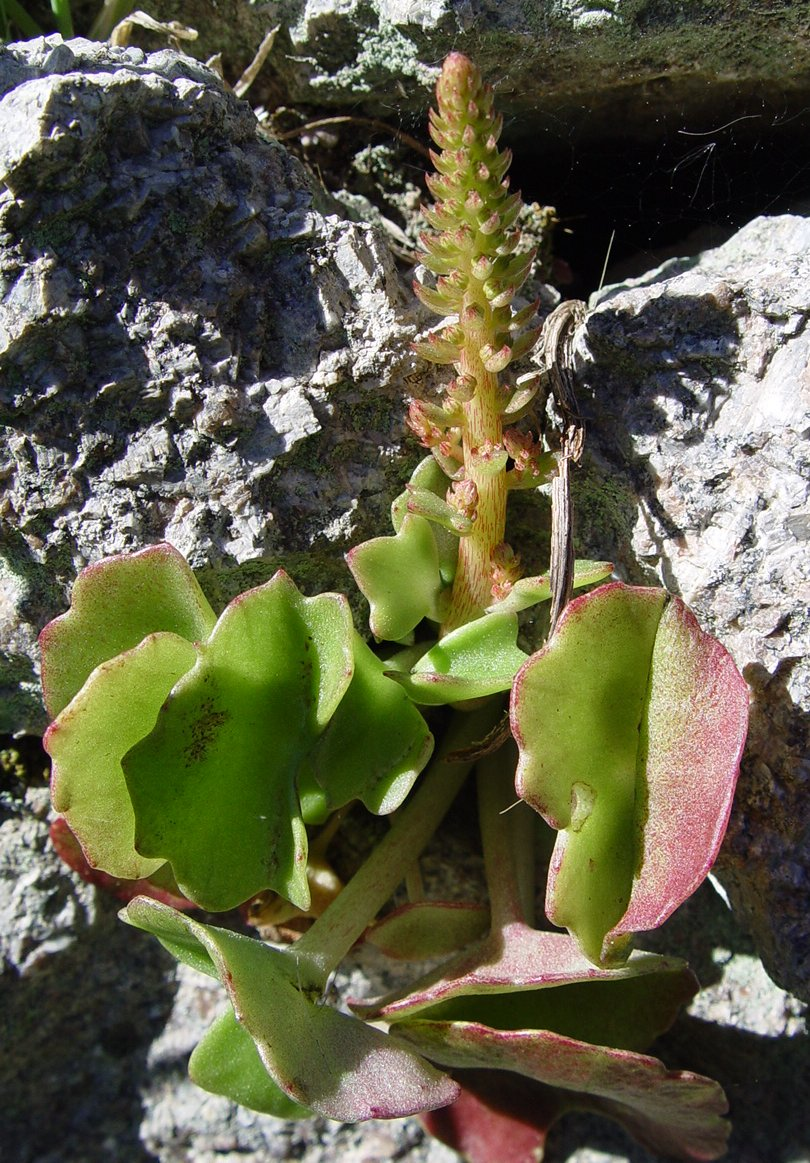
- Horizontal navelwort in bud

Scientific classification
- Kingdom: Plantae
- Clade: Tracheophytes
- Clade: Angiosperms
- Clade: Eudicots
- Order: Saxifragales
- Family: Crassulaceae
- Genus: Umbilicus
- Species: U. horizontalis

Binomial name
- Umbilicus horizontalis (Guss.) DC.

= Umbilicus horizontalis =

Species of succulent

Umbilicus horizontalis, the horizontal navelwort, is a fleshy perennial flowering plant in the family Crassulaceae (in the genus Umbilicus) native to the Mediterranean Basin and Middle East, from the Azores in the west to Oman in the east in rocky habitats.

Horizontal navelwort grows to an average of 25 cm (10 in) high. The thickly clustered, bell-shaped flowers are pale green, and grow in a raceme perpendicular to the spike, unlike common navelwort, whose flowers droop (thus the term "horizontal").

The plant often grows on shady walls or in damp rock crevices that are sparse in other plant growth, where its succulent, dark green leaves develop in rosettes that are about 7 cm (3 in) wide. Horizontal navelwort is similar to common navelwort in many respects, but is noticeably more succulent.

== Literature ==
- Mediterranean Wild Flowers, Marjorie Blamey & Christopher Grey-Wilson, HarperCollinsPublishers, 1993, ISBN 0 00 219901 7
