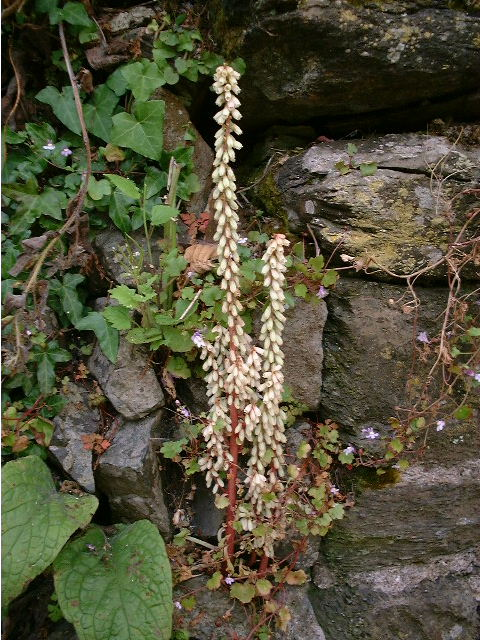
- Umbilicus rupestris in flower in coastal Devon

Scientific classification
- Kingdom: Plantae
- Clade: Embryophytes
- Clade: Tracheophytes
- Clade: Angiosperms
- Clade: Eudicots
- Order: Saxifragales
- Family: Crassulaceae
- Subfamily: Sempervivoideae
- Tribe: Umbiliceae
- Genus: Umbilicus; DC.

Species
- See text

= Umbilicus (plant) =

Genus of succulents

Umbilicus is a genus of over ninety species of flowering plants in the family Crassulaceae. Many of its species have been given synonyms under different genera such as Rosularia, Cotyledon, and Chiastophyllum. However, those that remain in Umbilicus are listed below:

- Umbilicus chloranthus (called green Venus' navel)
- Umbilicus chrysanthus (called Venus' navel)
- Umbilicus erectus (called reniform Venus' navel)
- Umbilicus horizontalis (called horizontal navelwort)
- Umbilicus intermedius (called intermediate navelwort)
- Umbilicus oppositifolius (called gold drop) (also as Chiastophyllum o.)
- Umbilicus rupestris (called navelwort)
- Umbilicus aetneus (Tornab)
- Umbilicus affinis (Schrenk)
- Umbilicus aizoon (Fenzl)
- Umbilicus albido-opacus (Carlström), sometimes referred to as opacus.
- Umbilicus alpestris (Karelin and Kirilov)
- Umbilicus botryoides (Hochstetter)
- Umbilicus citrinus (Wolley-Dod)
- Umbilicus coutinhoi (Mariz)
- Umbilicus cyprius (Holmboe)
- Umbilicus deflexus (Pomel, 1875)
- Umbilicus denticulatus (Turcz.)
- Umbilicus elymaiticus (Boiss. and Hauszknecht)
- Umbilicus erubescens (Maxim.)
- Umbilicus ferganicus (Popov)
- Umbilicus fimbriatus (Turcz.)
- Umbilicus gendjnamensis (Stapf)
- Umbilicus giganteus (Battandier)
- Umbilicus glaber (Regel and Winkler)
- Umbilicus globulariaefolius (Fenzl)
- Umbilicus haussknechtii / Umbilicus hauszknechtii (Boiss. and Reuter)
- Umbilicus heylandianus (Webb and Berthel.), found in Spain and Portugal
- Umbilicus hispidus (Lam.)
- Umbilicus lampusae (Kotschy)
- Umbilicus lassithiensis (Gandoger)
- Umbilicus leucanthus (G.Don)
- Umbilicus libanoticus (Labill.) — possibly Umbilicus glaber
- Umbilicus lievenii (Ledeb.)
- Umbilicus linearifolius (Franch.)
- Umbilicus lineatus (Boiss.)
- Umbilicus lineolatus (Boiss.)
- Umbilicus linifolius (Rupr.)
- Umbilicus luteus (Huds.)
- Umbilicus malacophyllus (Pall.)
- Umbilicus maroccanus (Gandoger)
- Umbilicus mexicanus (Schltdl., 1839)
- Umbilicus micranthus (Pomel)
- Umbilicus microstachyum (Kotschy)
- Umbilicus mirus (Pampan.)
- Umbilicus multicaulis (Boiss. and Buhse)
- Umbilicus multicaulis (Boiss. and Buhse)
- Umbilicus oreades (Decne.)
- Umbilicus oxypetalus (Boiss.)
- Umbilicus pallidiflorus (Holmboe)
- Umbilicus pallidus (Schott and Kotschy)
- Umbilicus paniculatus (Regel and Schmalh.)
- Umbilicus parviflorus (Desf.), found in Greece.
- Umbilicus patens (Pomel)
- Umbilicus patulus (Candargy)
- Umbilicus pendulinus (Wolley-Dod)
- Umbilicus persicus (Boiss.)
- Umbilicus pestalozzae (Boiss.)
- Umbilicus platyphyllus (Schrenk)
- Umbilicus praealtus (Brotero)
- Umbilicus pubescens (G.Don)
- Umbilicus pulvinatus (Rupr.)
- Umbilicus pulvinatus (Rupr.)
- Umbilicus radicans (Klotzsch)
- Umbilicus radiciflorus (Steud. and Boiss., 1872)
- Umbilicus ramosissimus (Maxim.)
- Umbilicus rodriguezii (Gandoger)
- Umbilicus samius (d'Urville)
- Umbilicus schmidtii (Bolle)
- Umbilicus sedoides (DC.)
- Umbilicus semenovii (Regel and Herder)
- Umbilicus semiensis (A.Rich.)
- Umbilicus sempervivum (Bieberstein)
- Umbilicus serpentinicus (Werdermann)
- Umbilicus serratus (DC.)
- Umbilicus sessilis (Dulac)
- Umbilicus seteveni (Ledeb. and A.Boriss.)
- Umbilicus simplex (C.Koch)
- Umbilicus spathulatus (Hook.)
- Umbilicus spinosus (DC.)
- Umbilicus sprunerianus (Boiss.)
- Umbilicus stamineus (Ledeb.)
- Umbilicus strangulatus (A.Berger)
- Umbilicus subspicatus (Freyn)
- Umbilicus subulatus (G.Don)
- Umbilicus thyrsiflorus (DC.)
- Umbilicus tropaeolifolius (Boiss., 1843)
- Umbilicus tuberculosus (DC. and Streud.)
- Umbilicus turkestanicus (Regel and Winkler)
- Umbilicus umbilicatus (Lam.)
- Umbilicus vulgaris (Batt. and Trabut)
- Umbilicus winkleri (Willkomm)

== Gallery ==
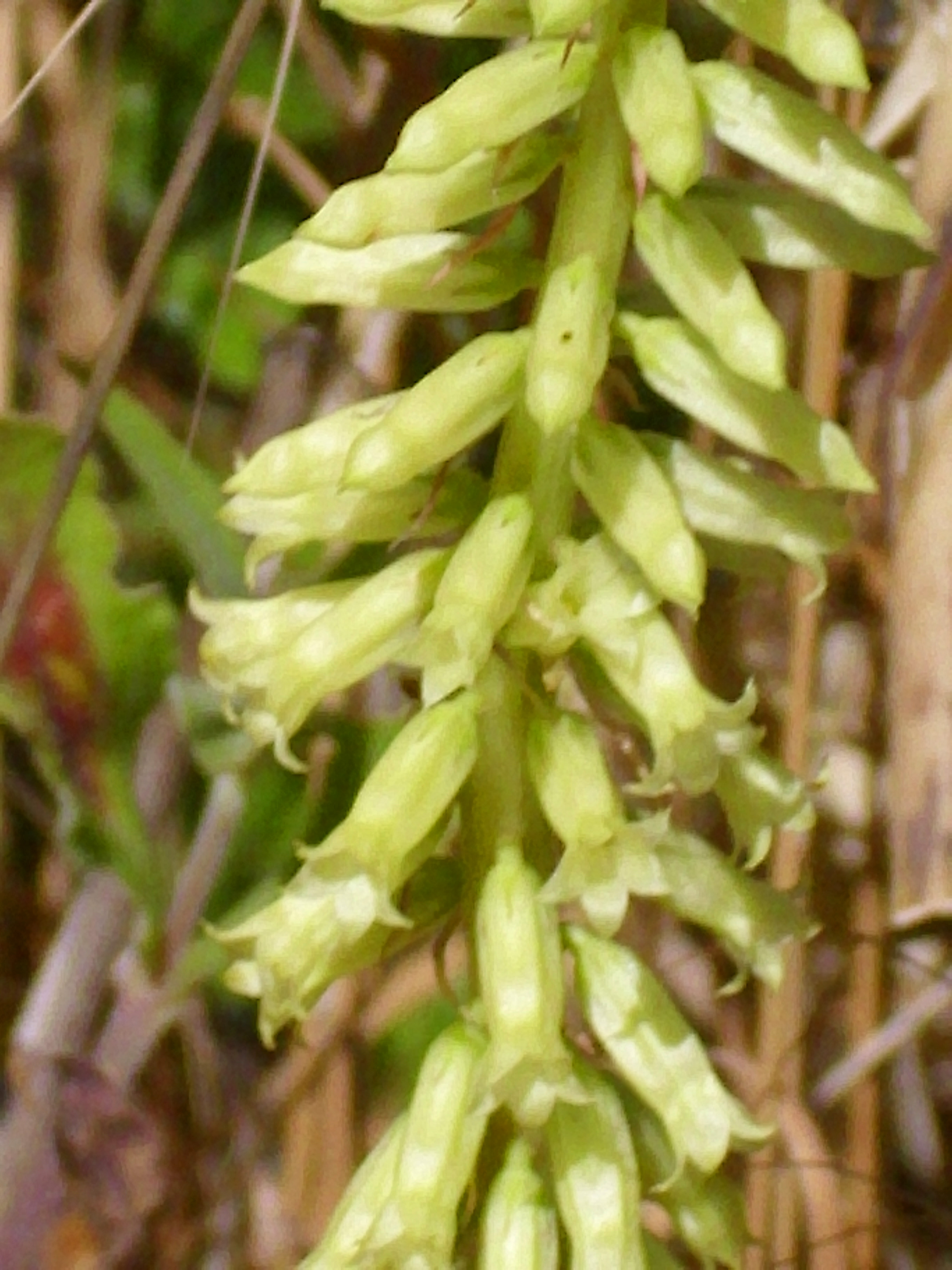

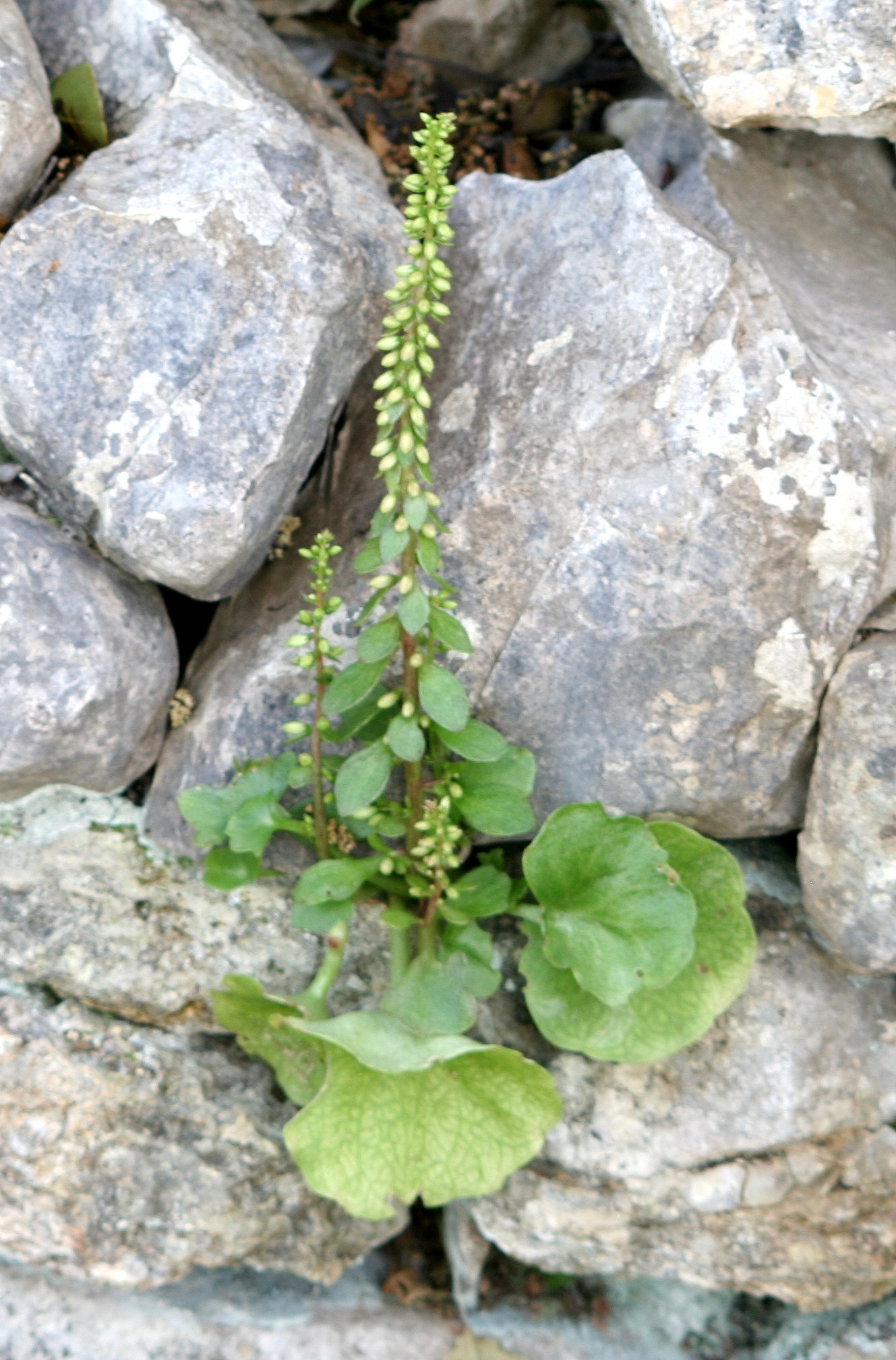

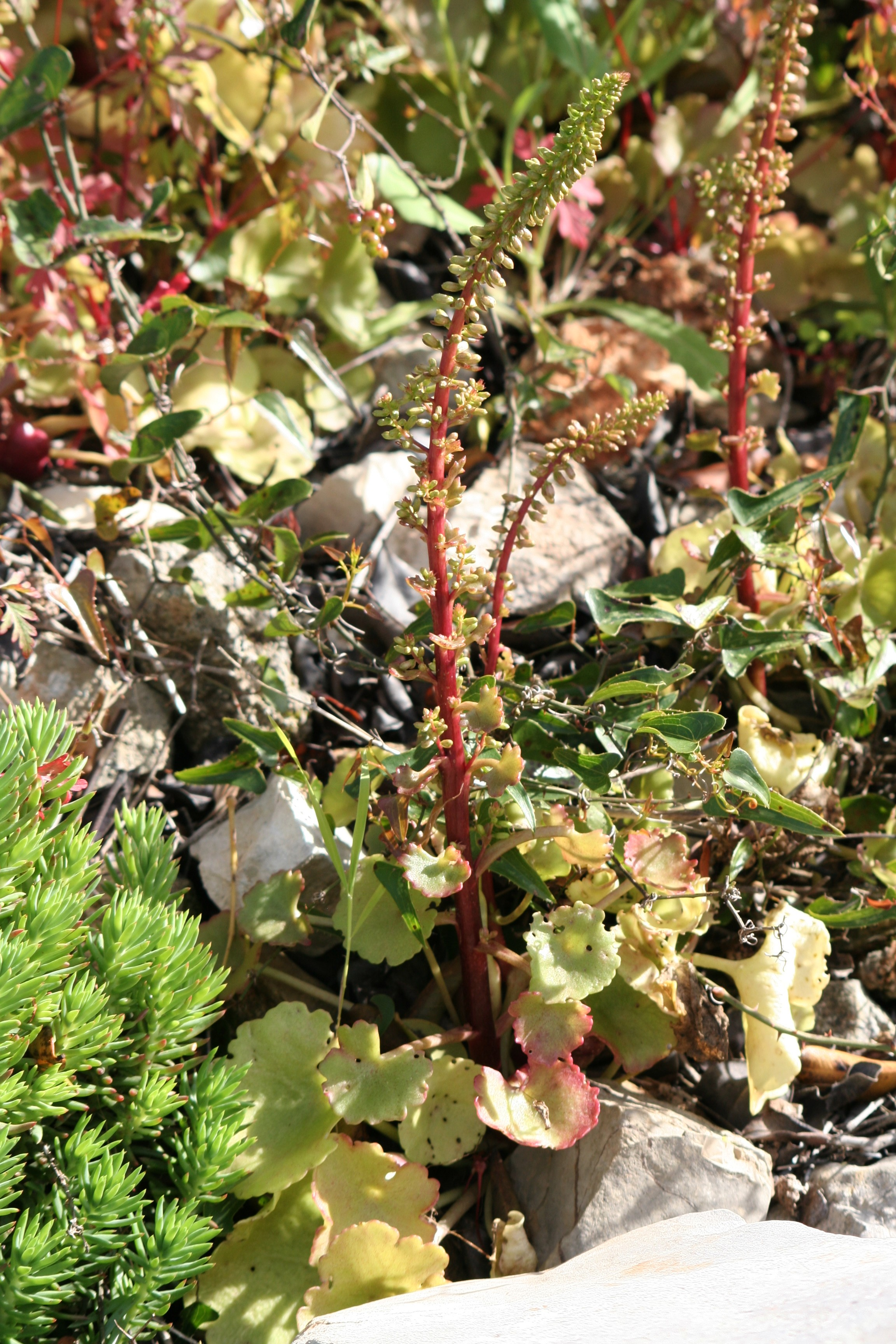

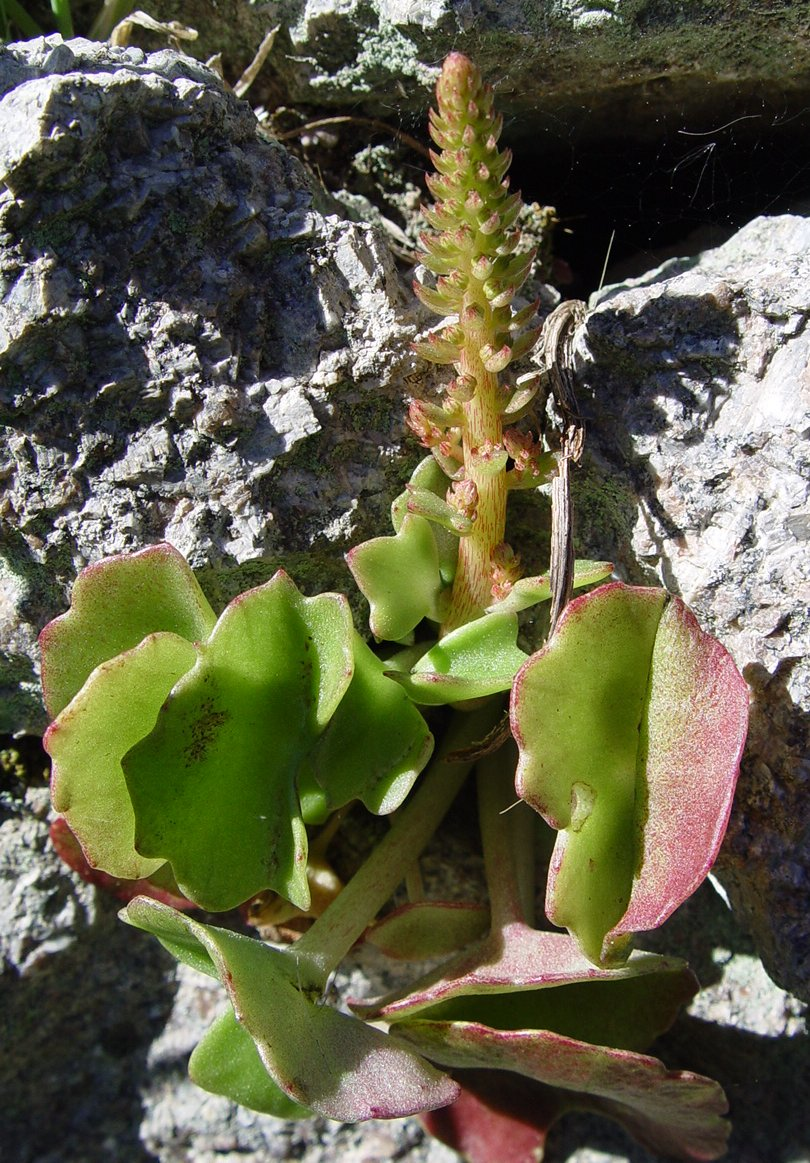

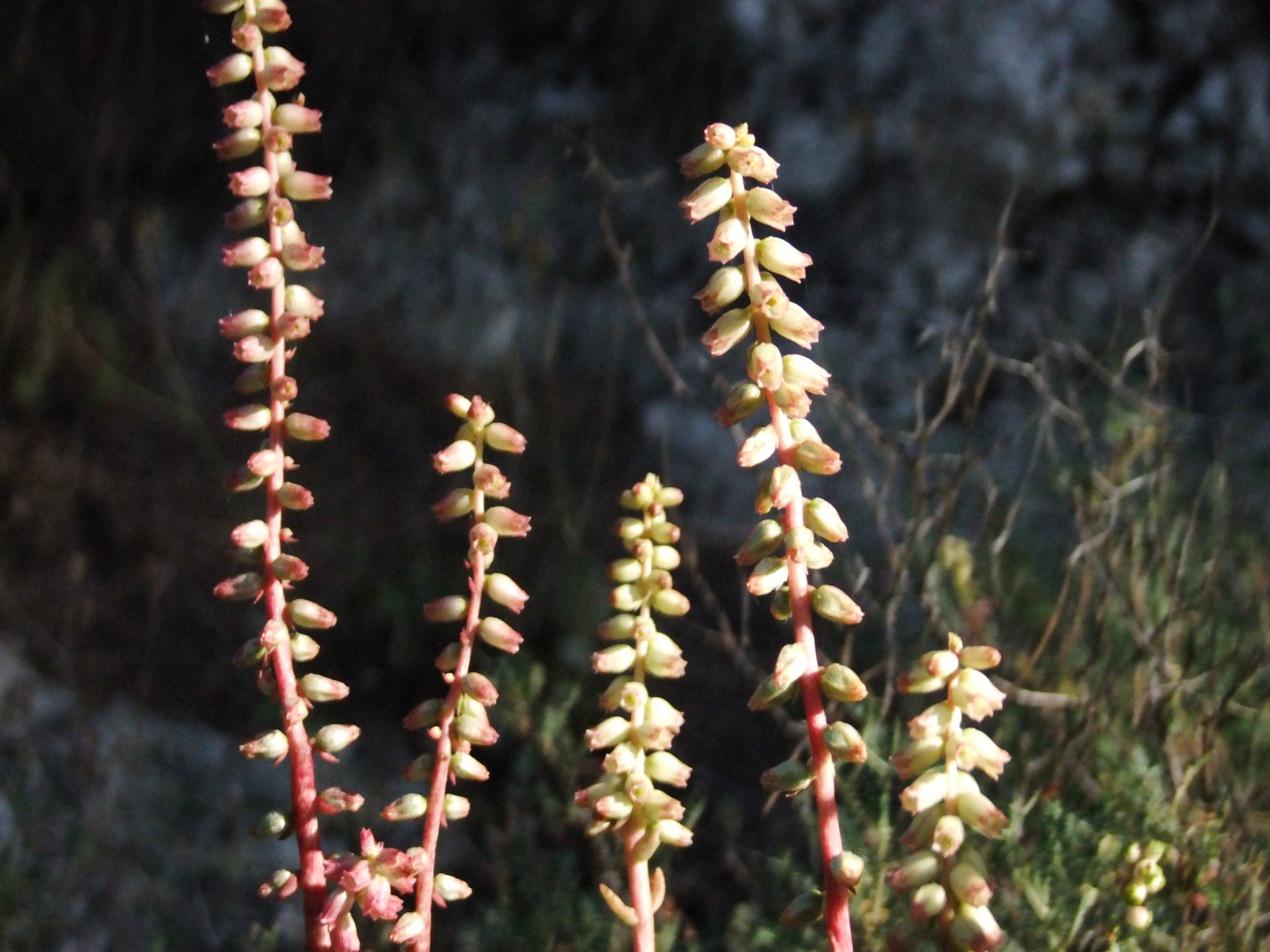

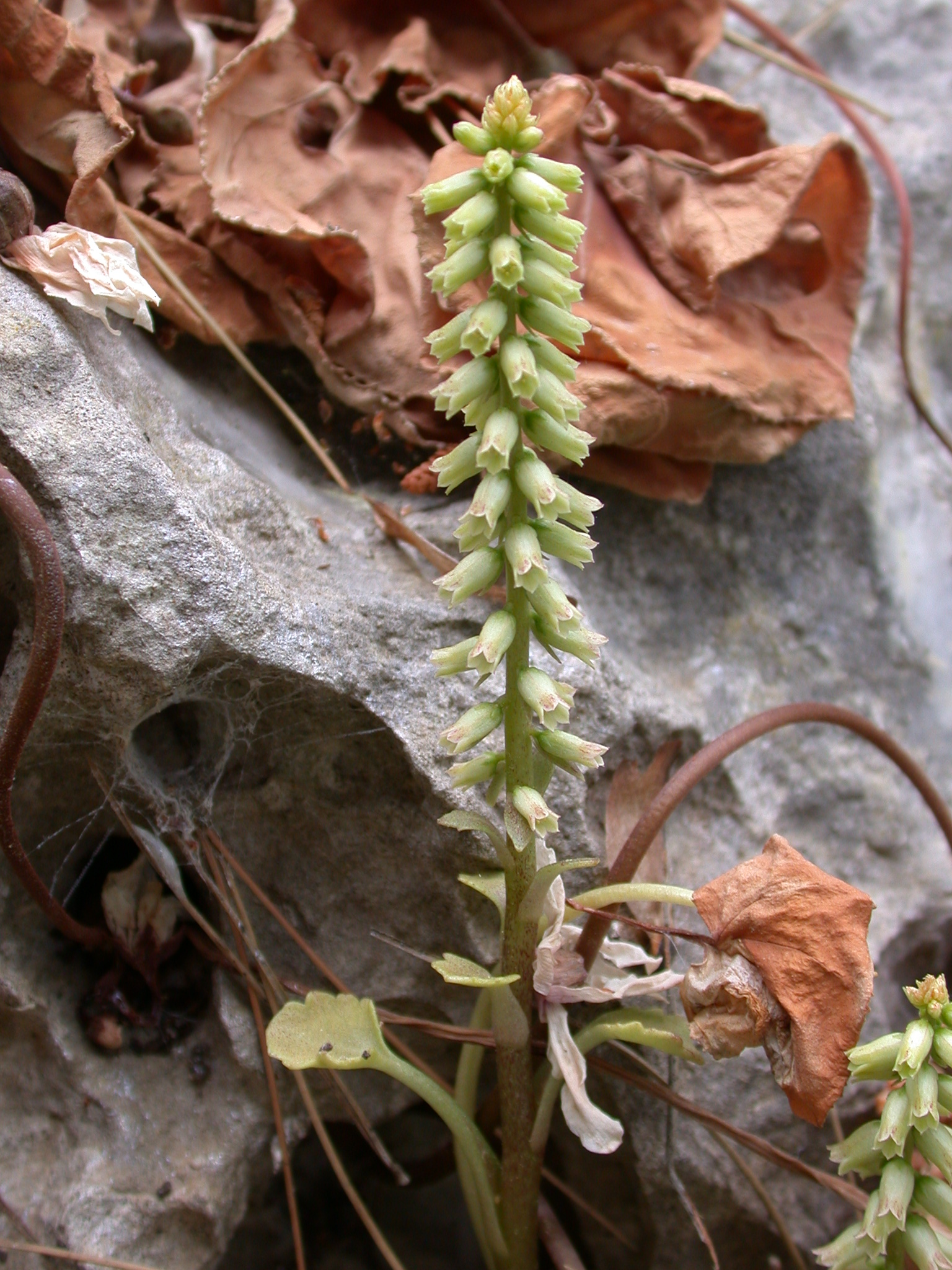

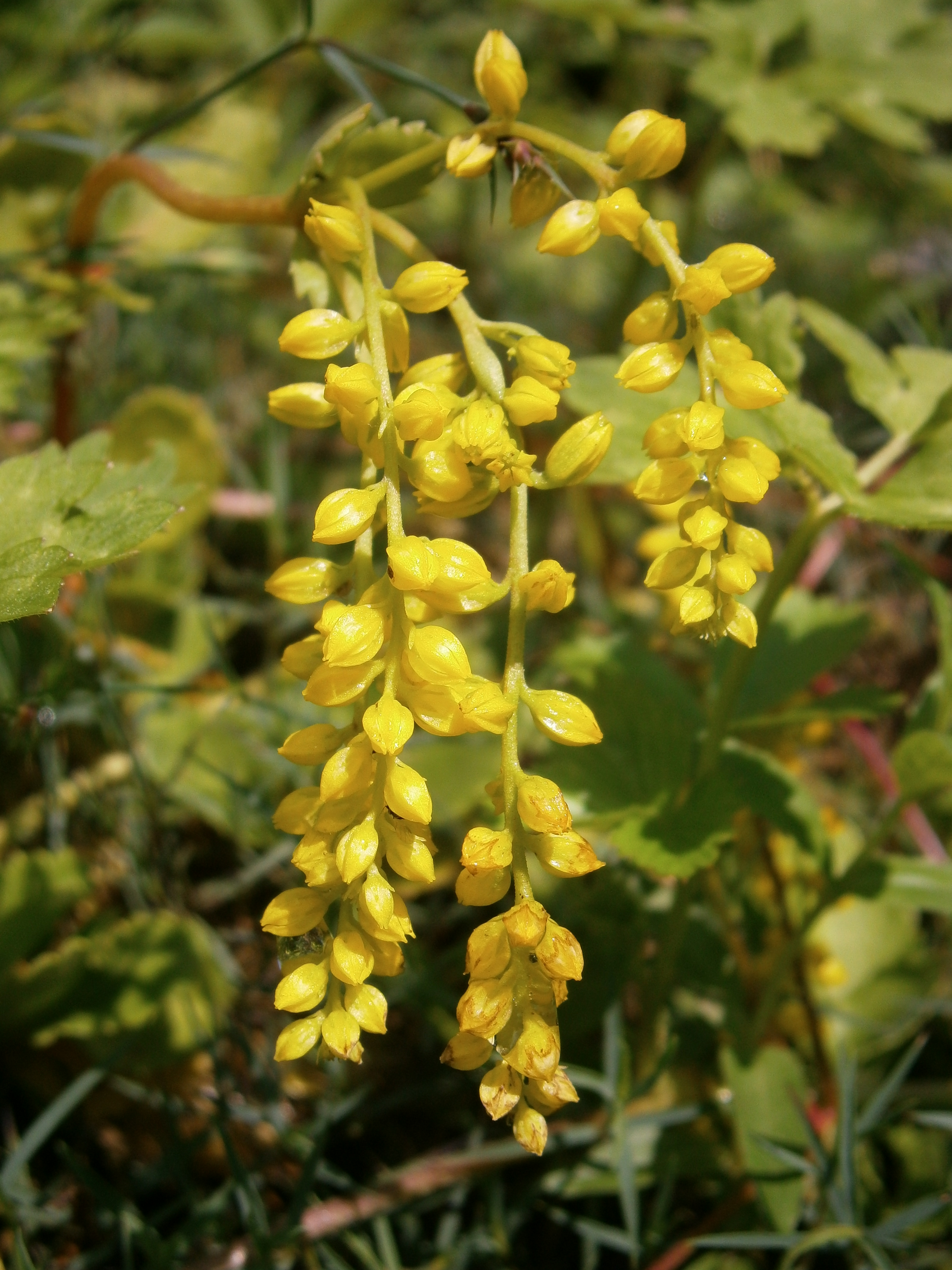

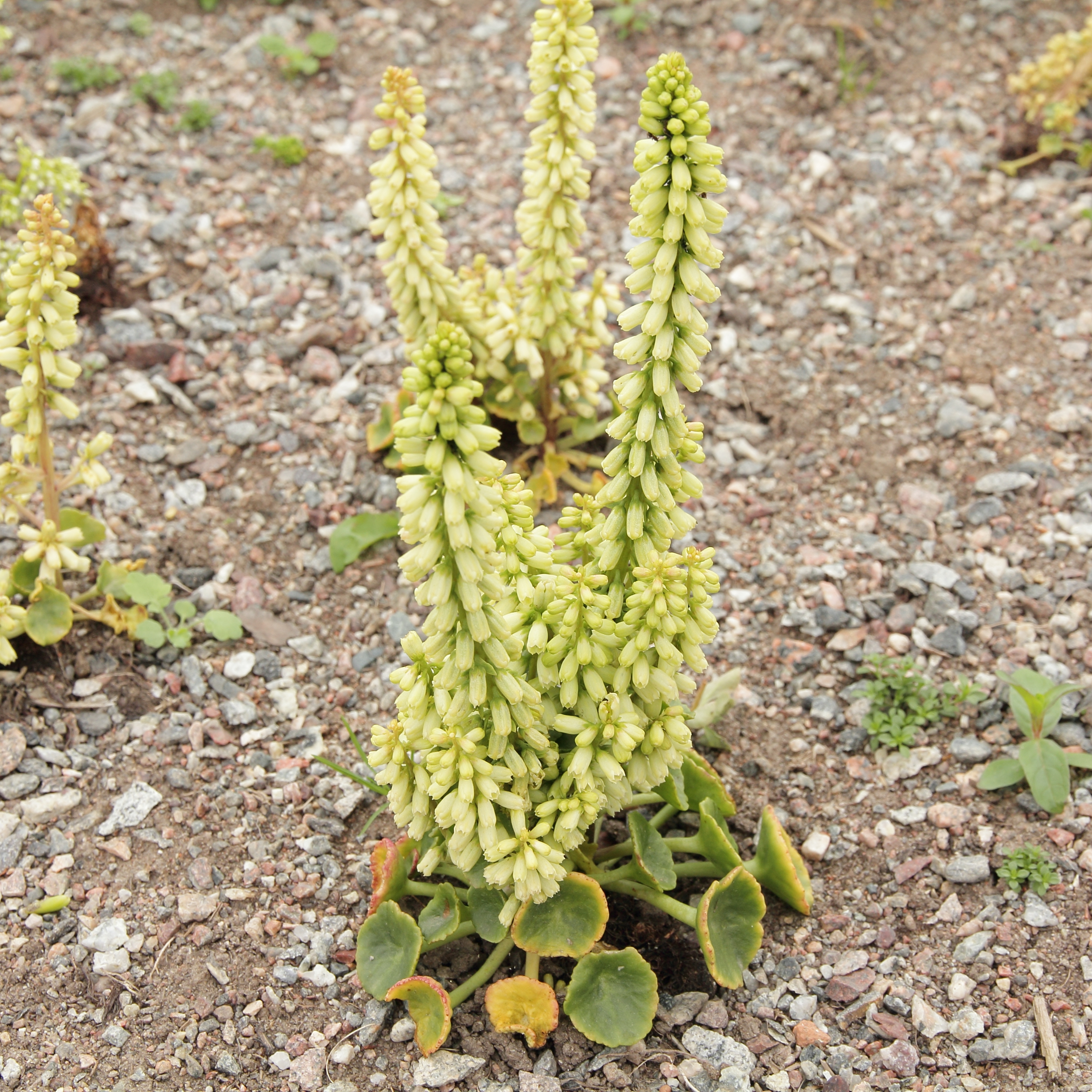
