= Physiological Plant Anatomy =

19th-century botany book

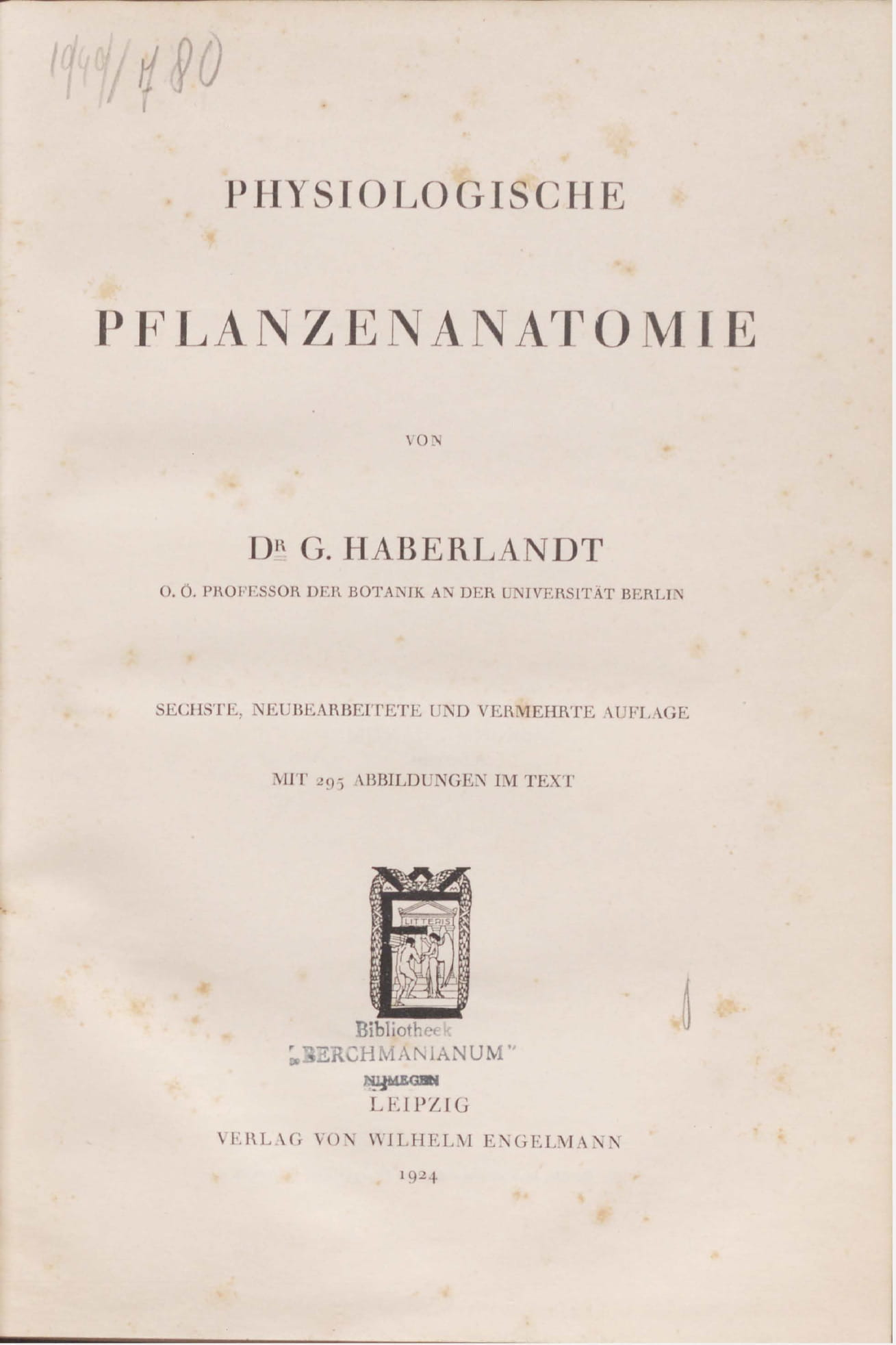
Book cover

Physiological Plant Anatomy (original German title: Physiologische Pflanzenanatomie) is a botany book first published in 1884 by Gottlieb Haberlandt (1854–1945). The textbook focuses on the investigation of each plant tissue layer and the final analysis of their physiological performance regarding the previous. With this book Haberlandt used a new viewpoint and motivation into combining different fields of science. He created an informative overview and a way of classifying plant tissues based upon their function.

== Context ==
At the end of the 19th century, the Austrian botanist Gottlieb Haberlandt (1854–1945) was well-known for his work regarding physiological plant anatomy. His interest for botany arose once he started university in Vienna at the age of nineteen. During his years at university he started his career by publishing papers. The first paper he published was about cellulose, a topic he referred to again later in his book. One year after his PhD, in 1877 he went to Tübingen to Simon Schwendener, a Swiss botanist who shared some of the same visions about plant anatomy as Haberlandt. There he started his own research regarding the evolution of the mechanical tissue systems (published as a book, Die Entwicklungsgeschichte des mechanischen Gewebesystems) which led to Schwendener calling him one of his best students and offering him a position as his successor as the chair of general botany in Berlin. It was the beginning of Haberlandt’s deep dive into the physiological aspects of plant anatomy, which later also led him in the publication of the book.

Two years after Haberlandt started his docentship at the University of Vienna, he was called to the Technische Hochschule Graz, now Graz University of Technology, to pursue his teachings as an acting professor of botany; simultaneously he became privatdocent at the university. The university saw his potential in teaching and wanted students to learn from him.

Through the publications of the Botanical Institute in Berlin, an institute founded by his coworker Schwendener, Haberlandt realised that the classification of tissue systems from a physiological plant anatomy point of view was missing. He took the opportunity and started working on the information and soon the book Physiologische Pflanzenanatomie was published. His previously-obtained knowledge made it easy to summarize all the information which would be useful for botany students. He started as a lecturer in Berlin in 1910 when Schwendener retired.

He founded a new institution for plant physiology (Pflanzen-physiologisches Institut) in Dahlem, which he was unable to resume working at after the First World War broke out. During the war he could not continue his normal jobs and work on his botanical projects. It took until the war was over until he was able to carry on with his botanical research and writing published papers.

The anatomy of plants is a key element for scientific classifications, which, in the 18th century with Carl von Linné, became the beginning of structure-based taxonomy. During the 19th century, the time when Haberlandt's Physiologische Pflanzenanatomie was published, the field started to grow even further. Haberlandt had a specific method of conducting his research; the same method was also carried out by A. F. W. Schimpfer. He tried to reach conclusions about the connection between functions and structures of tissues on the basis of purely anatomical investigation. With this defined method, he investigated many plant tissues and published all of his findings in the book Physiologische Pflanzenanatomie.

== Content ==
The book contains 14 chapters in 616 pages on the different mechanisms and parts of the plant's body. There are 264 drawings from Haberlandt himself included. In the prologue for the first edition, Haberlandt mentions that he wanted to combine the anatomy of plants with physiological performance.

It aimed to show his readers how to classify plants based on their function. It was intended to serve as a book for informative guidance and inspiration. The book gives more examples to explain concepts instead of listing them, which is suitable since he wanted to give advice as well as creating new ideas and viewpoints. Haberlandt wanted not only to create a comprehensive summary with this book, but he wanted to offer the target audience a new outlook into the possible future of botany.

The author was well aware of critics and he made sure to point out hypothetical statements as well as viewpoints that are pushed by certain scientists.

Haberlandt mentions in the prelude that he tried to be careful with his references and that he tried his best to hold back his own opinion and write from a neutral perspective.

Chapter 1-4: These chapters discuss cells and how the single components of a cell work and interact. Haberlandt then touches on topics like urmeristem, epidermis and mechanical cells (stereids). He explains the functions of the epidermis and how mechanical building principles work.

Chapter 5-10: Haberlandt describes how a plant absorbs organic and inorganic substances, and how the assimilation of cells and chloroplast work. He also covers the transport, uptake, storage and secretion of water and minerals and the tasks of vessels and different glands. How the photosynthetic system works is also described by Haberlandt.

Chapter 11-13: Haberlandt talks about the movement of plants and how tissues play an essential role. He also elaborates more on the effect of light stimuli on plants and their sensory organs and how signals are transmitted in plants..

Chapter 14: The last chapter discusses the secondary thickness growth of the trunks in different species. Haberlandt explains the basic parts of wood, the arrangement of the tissues in the wood body and how to read growth rings of a tree. This information is nicely supported by images.

== Scientific illustration ==
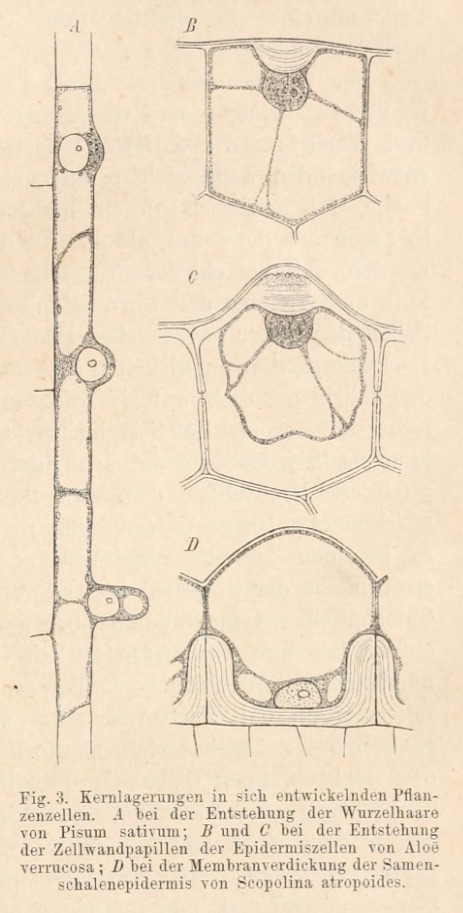
Das Assimilationsystem

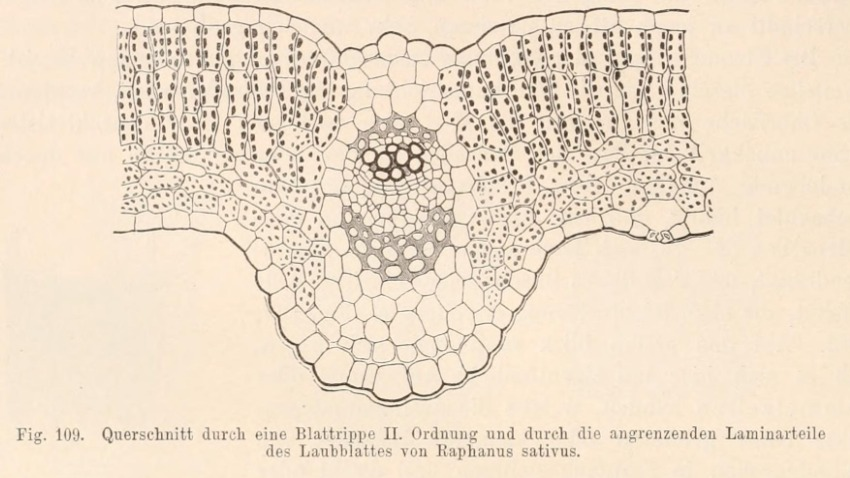
Die Zellen und Gewebe der Pflanzen

His botanical illustrations serve the idea of showing all parts of the plant in scientific accuracy to support the study and understanding of them. This can be seen throughout the book, where he used his drawings as a visual guide for his writings. His understanding of plant morphology is reflected by the scientific quality of his botanical illustrations. The illustrations included in his book are a tool of investigation and analysis. He himself used the medium of water colours and oil, while in his book he used graphite, which was then printed in ink. The characteristics of his illustrations include high accuracy and details. One of his wishes was to write a botany text-book for artists and craftsmen, to show the importance of scientific illustration. His work with watercolours could not be preserved since light most likely caused them to fade over the years. Some might also have been lost over the years. Graphite illustrations from the printed books are the only ones that we can still find in good condition today. These were also digitised and are available online.

== Publication ==
The book Physiologische Pflanzenanatomie has six editions. The first edition was published in May 1884 in Graz, Austria, the second in September 1896 also in Graz, the third in April 1904 in Naples, Italy. The book was published by the German bookseller Wilhelm Engelmann.

Between the first and second editions, the book underwent some changes. Ninety-five additional images were added, as well as ten additional pages as a result of new chapters that were added. The two chapters about normal and abnormal growth in girth (normales und das anormale Dickenwachstum) were combined into one chapter.

Between the second and third editions and between the first and second editions, some changes within the chapters took place and additional information was added. Twenty-nine new images were included in the book. Four additional pages were added.

== Reception ==
After the publication of Physiologische Pflanzenanatomie in 1884, the book received different opinions. Some people were enthusiastic about it, while others refused the new viewpoints. Seven years earlier, the book Vergleichende Anatomie der Vegetationsorgane der Phanerogamen und Farne ('Comparative anatomy of the vegetative organs of the phanerogams and ferns') by DeBarys was published. This book included twelve years of detailed research and was then thought to be the possible final statement on plant anatomy. Haberlandt was a young botanist with a new vision at the time, suggesting a connection between anatomy and physiology that cannot even be fully demonstrated through experiments. In those years science did not value analogies. Meanwhile analogies were a source of inspiration for Haberlandt. This book was intended mainly as an educational textbook. In the end it found resonance not only within Europe but also as far as Japan. After the first publications, Haberlandt's fellow scientists described the book as a botany novel and wanted to keep it away from their students to prevent heretical thoughts. This disagreement was also projected onto people who worked together with Haberlandt, like Schwendener. With each new edition of the book, Haberlandt referred back to those critics. The critics felt that it was too teleologically based and the author explained his distance from every form of vitalism multiple times.

By 1992 the book Physiologische Pflanzenanatomie was seen as one of the most successful books about plant anatomy, making it the most famous book by Haberlandt. It took over half a century for his ideas to be fully adopted by his fellow scientists. He took a point of view that was different to the standard procedures of other scientists; broad knowledge and his interest in the subject helped him receive acknowledgement after the publication of Physiologische Pflanzenanatomie.

In a review paper published in 1905, the author points out the scarcity of literature of the same quality as Haberlandt's in the English language. Non-German speakers were only presented with certain chapters which had been translated by this time, but were hoping for a full translation of the third edition, which was published in 1914 by Montagu Drummond.

For others, Haberlandt's use of his anatomy knowledge and the way he combined it with the field of botany was unique; it was one of the main points that set him apart from other writers. Readers were aware of Haberlandt's tendency to exaggerate the point he was trying to make, but they were pleased with his passion and creativity to think further. The book supported many students in their studies and it presented plant anatomy in much detail. Otto Haertel described Haberlandt as being known for his visionary approach, which was balanced between speculation and traditional inductive reasoning. One of his past students wrote, regarding Haberlandt, that the Germans called it a philosophical mind. The target audience for the book was broad. Haberlandt wanted to make it accessible and engaging for people with the same interests. A large part of the book is also a summary of the knowledge obtained up until the publication date, creating a solid viewpoint for the public. But for Haberlandt it was important to push it further and bring what were then-controversial topics into a different light.

In the 21st century Haberlandt is a known name in the field of plant anatomy and his ideas are still being discussed.The book can be found in different libraries around the world. For example, the third edition of the book Physiologische Pflanzenanatomie can be found in the Maastricht University Library; it is part of the special collection.
