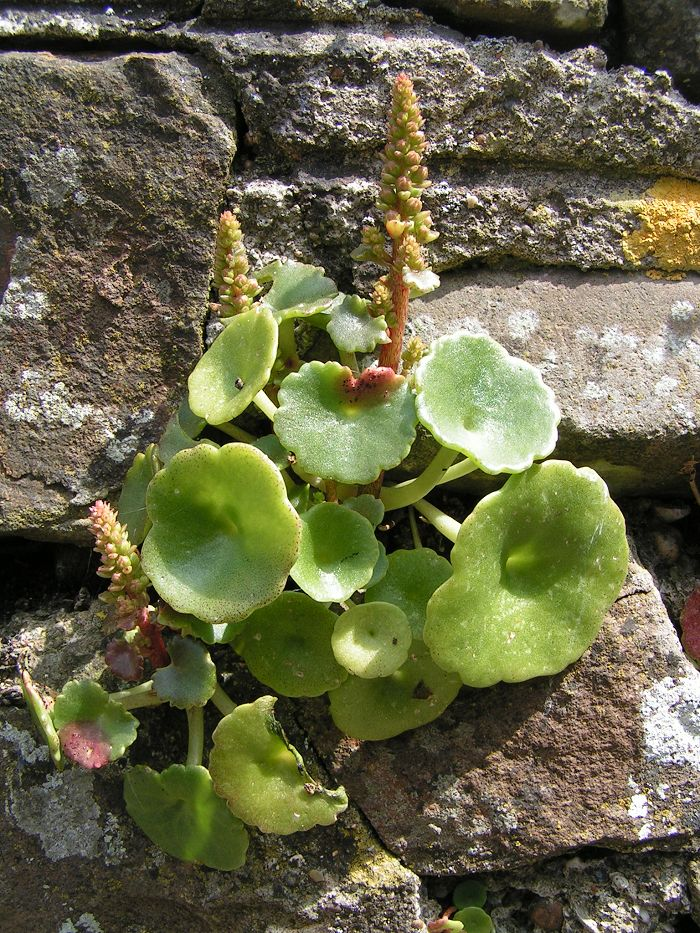
- Budding Umbilicus rupestris in Instow, North Devon

Scientific classification
- Kingdom: Plantae
- Clade: Tracheophytes
- Clade: Angiosperms
- Clade: Eudicots
- Order: Saxifragales
- Family: Crassulaceae
- Genus: Umbilicus
- Species: U. rupestris

Binomial name
- Umbilicus rupestris (Salisb.) Dandy

Synonyms
- Cotyledon umbilicus-veneris L. Cotyledon rupestris Salisb., nom. inval. Umbilicus pendulinus DC. Cotyledon neglecta Cout. Umbilicus neglectus (Cout.) Rothm. & P.Silva; Cotyledon umbilicus Britten

= Wall Pennywort =

Navelwort

Species of succulent

Wall pennywort (Umbilicus rupestris), also called navelwort,, hipwort or penny-pies, is a fleshy, perennial, edible flowering plant in the stonecrop family Crassulaceae in the genus Umbilicus so named for its umbilicate (navel-like) leaves.

== Etymology ==
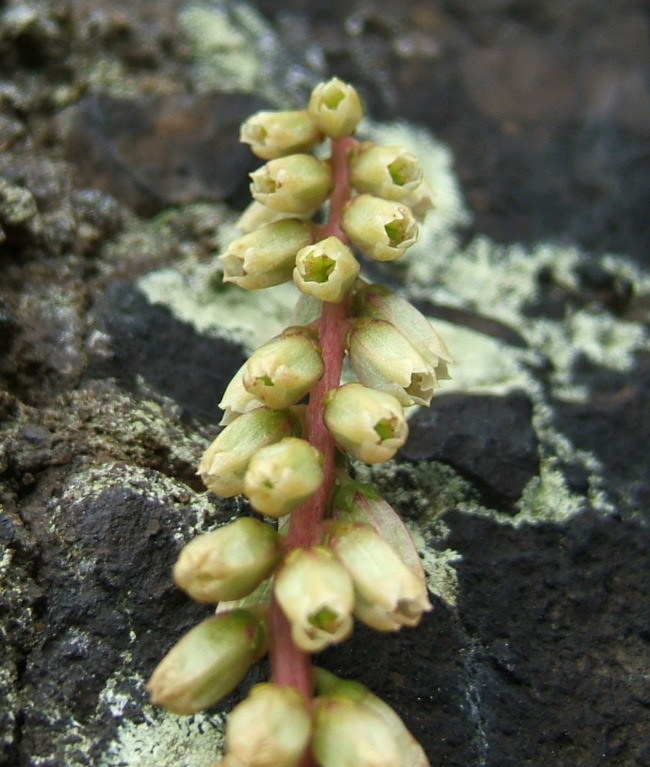
Detail of Umbilicus rupestris near Stirling, Scotland

Both the name "navelwort" and the scientific name Umbilicus come from the round shape of the leaves, which have a navel-like depression in the center.

== Description ==
Wall pennywort grows to an average of 25 cm (9.8 in) high. The pallid spikes of bell-shaped, greenish-pink flowers of this plant first appear in May, and the green fruits ripen through the summer.

== Distribution ==
The plant is found in southern and western Europe, often growing on shady walls or in damp rock crevices that are sparse in other plant growth (thus, "wall" pennywort), where its succulent leaves develop in rosettes.

It is not at present under threat.

== Medicinal usage ==
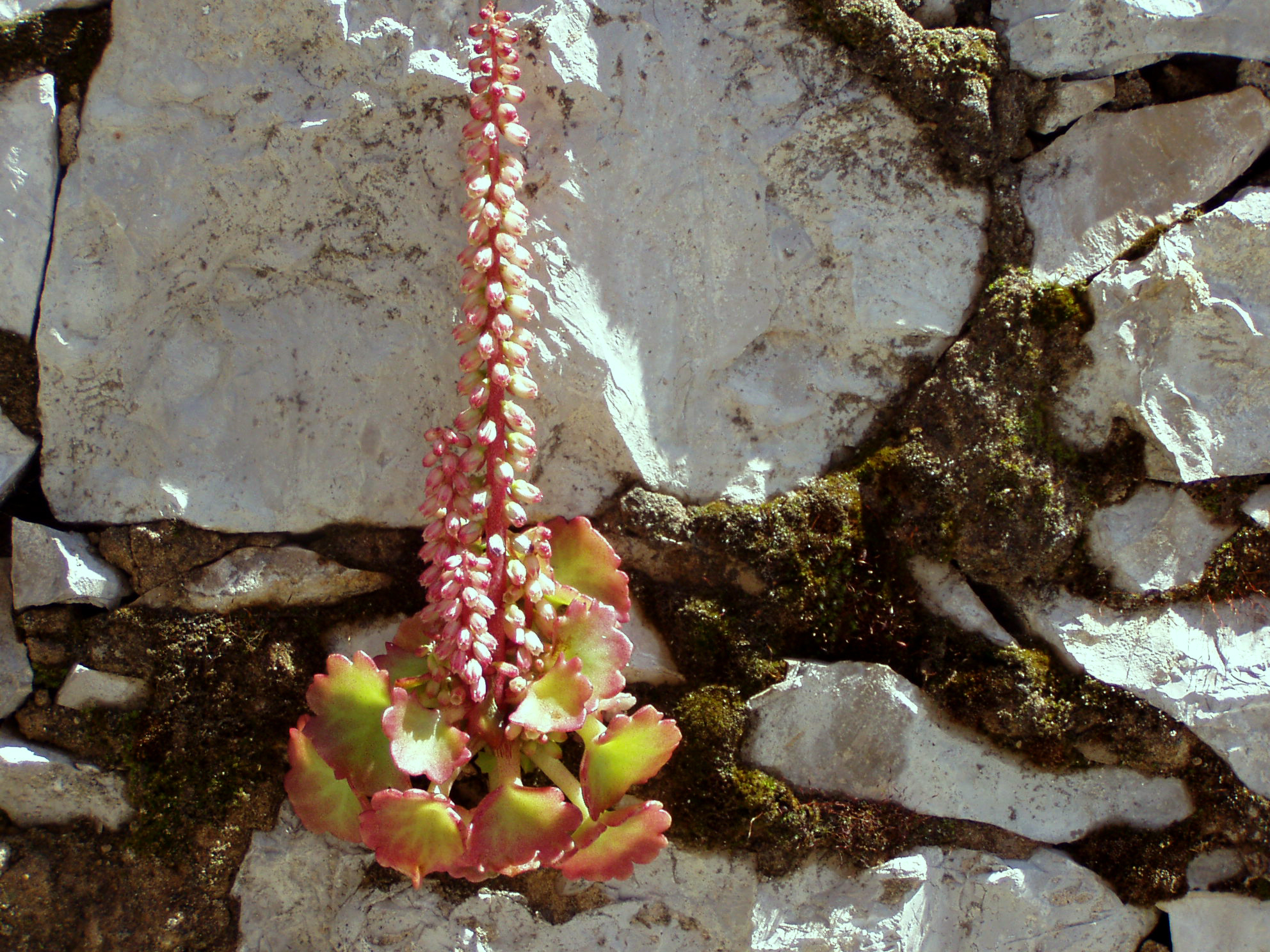
Umbilicus rupestris in bloom in Nazaré, Portugal. The flower can turn red in sunlight.

Umbilicus rupestris is not the same "Pennywort" as the one used in Asian medicine, which is the unrelated Asiatic Pennywort, Centella asiatica.

Navelwort is also assumed to be the "Kidneywort" referred to by Nicholas Culpeper in The English Physician, although it may actually refer to the unrelated Anemone hepatica. Culpeper used astrology, rather than science, to classify herbs, and as such is not a reliable source. He claimed:

The juice or the distilled water being drank, is very effectual for all inflammations and unnatural heats, to cool a fainting hot stomach, a hot liver, or the bowels: the herb, juice, or distilled water thereof, outwardly applied, heals pimples, St. Anthony's fire, and other outward heats. The said juice or water helps to heal sore kidneys, torn or fretted by the stone, or exulcerated within; it also provokes urine, is available for the dropsy, and helps to break the stone. Being used as a bath, or made into an ointment, it cools the painful piles or hæmorrhoidal veins. It is no less effectual to give ease to the pains of the gout, the sciatica, and helps the kernels or knots in the neck or throat, called the king's evil: healing kibes and chilblains if they be bathed with the juice, or anointed with ointment made thereof, and some of the skin of the leaf upon them: it is also used in green wounds to stay the blood, and to heal them quickly.

=== Properties ===
- Vulnerary: The plant is sometimes employed to ease pain on scratches by applying the leaf to the skin after removing the lower cuticle.

== See also ==
- Pilea peperomioides, similar looking rosid
- Hydrocotyle vulgaris, a similar looking asterid
