= Money tree =

Money tree may refer to:

== Culture ==
- Money tree (myth), a Chinese myth
- Money tree, an offering given to the Buddha in temples, particularly in the Kathina festival
- Money tree (Britain), a cultural offering found across Britain

== Plants ==
- Crassula ovata or jade plant, also referred to as "money tree"
- Hydrocotyle vulgaris, a small, creeping, perennial, aquatic herb native to Europe, North Africa and West Asia
- Lunaria, also referred to as "money plant", because the seedpods resemble a large coin
- Pachira glabra, commercially sold under the name "money tree", also known as lucky tree, Guinea peanut, French peanut, and Saba nut
- Pachira aquatica, a tree commonly grown with a braided trunk and sold under the name "money tree", also known as Malabar chestnut, French peanut, Guiana chestnut, provision tree, Saba nut, and money plant
- Pilea peperomioides, also known as "Chinese money tree"
- Theobroma cacao, because its beans were used as currency

== Arts and entertainment ==
=== Literature ===
- The Money Tree, a children's book by Sarah Stewart
- The Money Tree Myth: A Parents' Guide to Helping Kids Unravel the Mysteries of Money, a book by Gail Vaz-Oxlade

=== Songs ===
- "Money Trees", by Kendrick Lamar featuring Jay Rock
- "The Money Tree", by Margaret Whiting
- "The Money Tree", from The Act
- "The Money Tree", by Blue October from Any Man in America
- "The Money Tree", by Amy Krouse Rosenthal

=== Film ===
- The Moneytree, 1992 American film

== Other uses ==
- Moneytree, a Seattle-based business

== See also ==
- "All Around The Money Tree", a 1969 episode of American television detective series Mannix
- Money plant, several plants
- "Money Trees Deuce", a song by Jay Rock
- "No such thing as a free lunch", a popular adage
- Quantitative easing, an expansionary monetary policy
