= Lunaria telekiana =

Scientific classification
- Kingdom: Plantae
- Clade: Tracheophytes
- Clade: Angiosperms
- Clade: Eudicots
- Clade: Rosids
- Order: Brassicales
- Family: Brassicaceae
- Genus: Lunaria
- Species: L. telekiana

Binomial name
- Lunaria telekiana Jáv.

Species of plant

Lunaria telekiana is a flowering plant in the genus Lunaria and family Brassicaceae. It is a rare and poorly known species known from Albania, Montenegro, and Kosovo. It has been proposed for protection under international treaties on endangered species.

== Habitat and distribution ==
Lunaria telekiana is a European endemic species with a restricted distribution in the southeastern Dinaric Alps, specifically in the Prokletije Mountains (also known as the Albanian Alps or Bjeshkët e Nemuna). The species occurs in three countries: Albania, Montenegro, and Serbia (Kosovo).

Initially described from Mali i Shkëlzenit (Mount Shkelzen) near Tropojë in northeastern Albania in 1918, L. telekiana was long considered a narrow Albanian endemic. More recent field studies have confirmed its presence across a wider area spanning three countries, with documented localities in Albania, Montenegro, and Serbia. These locations span eight 10×10 km UTM grid squares, all within the Prokletije Mountains region, at elevations ranging from 500 to 1800 metres above sea level.

Lunaria telekiana primarily grows in open calcareous screes (limestone rubble slopes) in the altimontane and subalpine vegetation belts, typically at elevations between 1100 and 1600 metres. These habitats belong to the phytosociological class Thlaspietea rotundifolii and order Drypetalia spinosae, which characterise rocky, unstable slopes. The species can also be found in tall-herb communities (Mulgedio-Aconitetea class, Cicerbidetalia pancicianae order) dominated by species such as Cicerbita pancicii, Geum bulgaricum, Veratrum album, and Adenostyles alliariae, as well as subalpine beech forest margins and clearings. In all cases, L. telekiana grows on very shallow, skeletal soils derived from limestone. Its occasional presence in forest habitats appears to represent recent vegetation succession from open scree habitats toward more stable forest communities.

Field observations indicate variable population sizes across its range. The Montenegrin populations in the Karanfili massif above the Grebaja valley are relatively robust, with several hundred individuals observed in good reproductive condition. In the southern Prokletije (Parun mountain range), smaller populations of up to a hundred individuals have been recorded. The Tropoja valley in Albania hosts the largest known population, estimated at many hundreds to a few thousand individuals. Based on its restricted distribution and population assessments, L. telekiana is classified as Vulnerable across its entire European range, Endangered within Albania and Montenegro, and Critically Endangered in Serbia. The species is strictly protected by national legislation in all three countries where it occurs and is included in Annex I of the Berne Convention as a species of European conservation concern.
