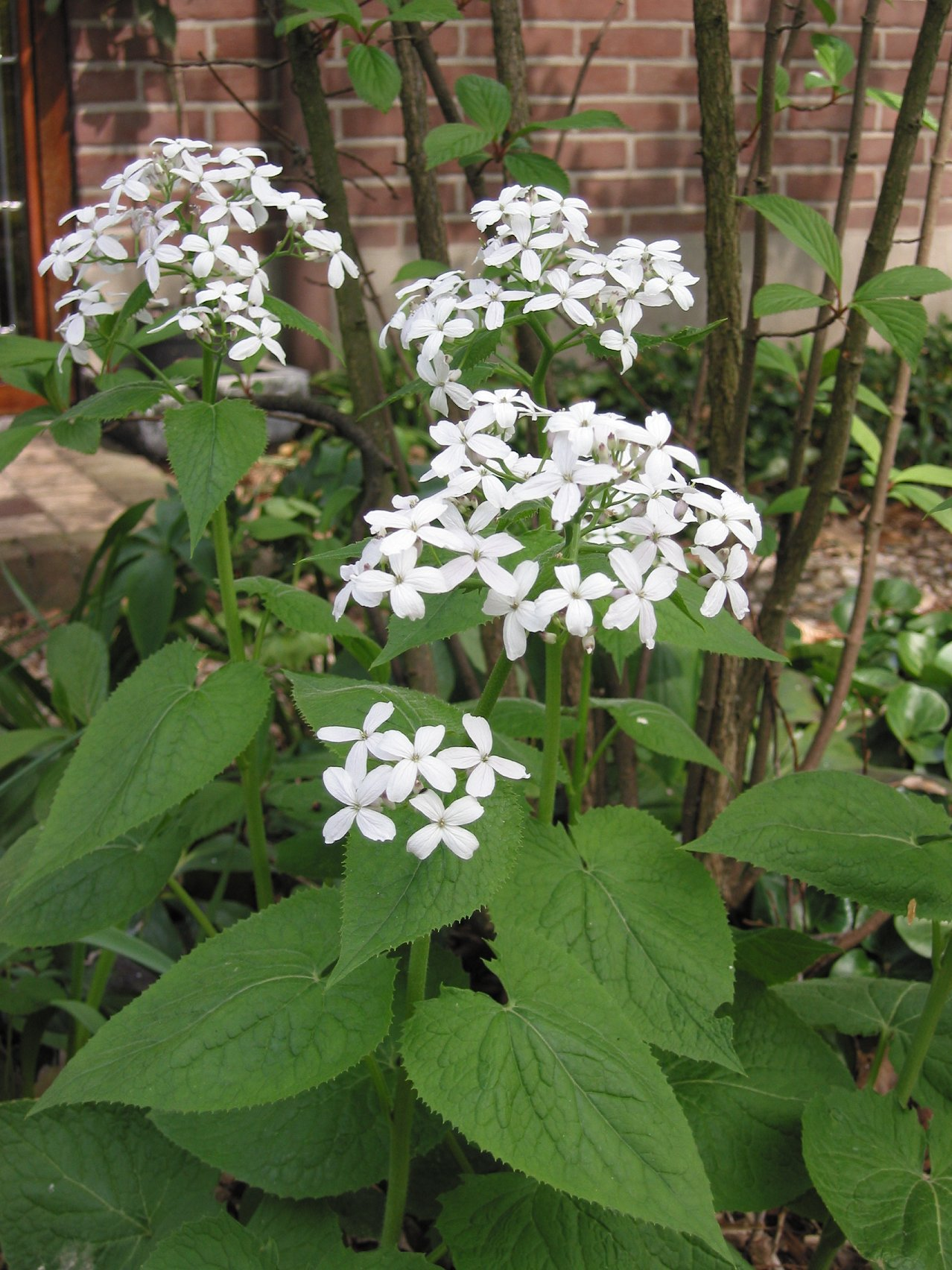

Scientific classification
- Kingdom: Plantae
- Clade: Tracheophytes
- Clade: Angiosperms
- Clade: Eudicots
- Clade: Rosids
- Order: Brassicales
- Family: Brassicaceae
- Genus: Lunaria
- Species: L. rediviva

Binomial name
- Lunaria rediviva L.

= Lunaria rediviva =

Species of flowering plant

Lunaria rediviva, known as perennial honesty, is a species of plant in the cabbage family Brassicaceae. This hairy-stemmed herbaceous perennial is found throughout Europe. It often grows in damp woods on lime substrates. Growing up to 1 m (3.3 ft) tall, it has large, pointed oval leaves with marked serrations. Clusters of fragrant, pale pink flowers are borne in spring, followed by translucent oval seedheads, often used in flower arranging. It is cultivated as a garden plant, and has gained the Royal Horticultural Society's Award of Garden Merit.

The Latin specific epithet rediviva means "growing again", "reviving", in reference to its perennial habit, which distinguishes it from its biennial or annual cousin, Lunaria annua.

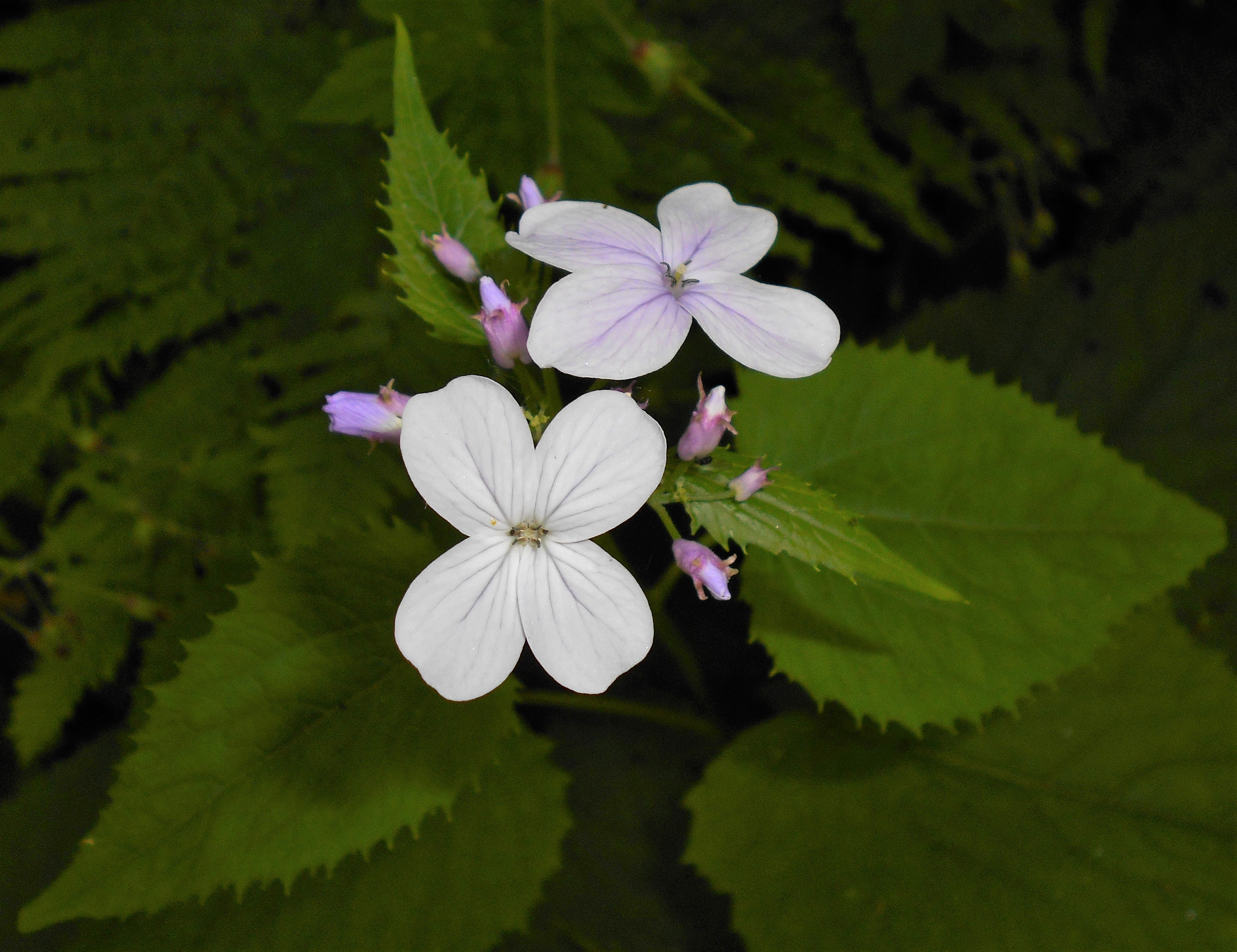

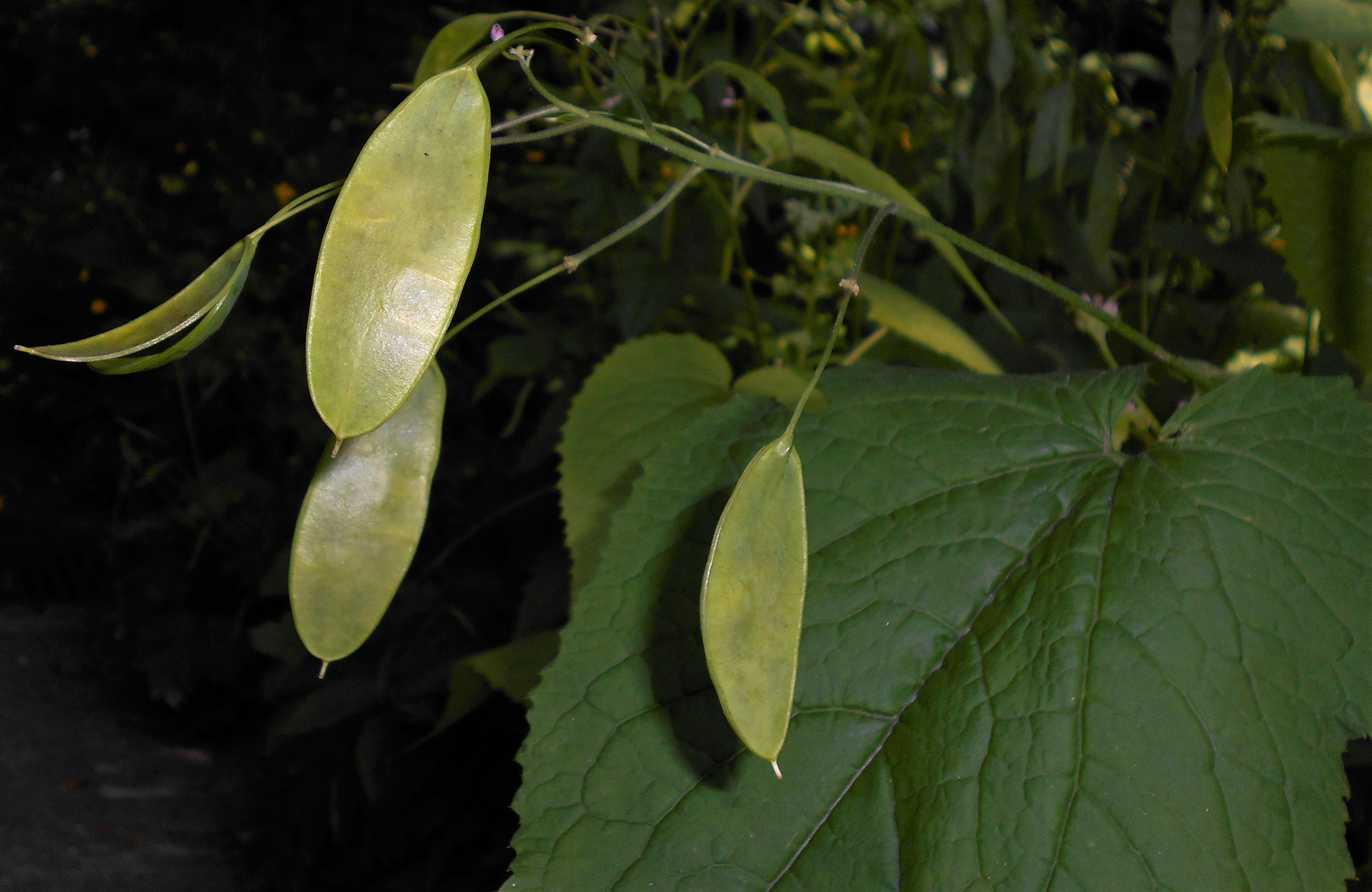

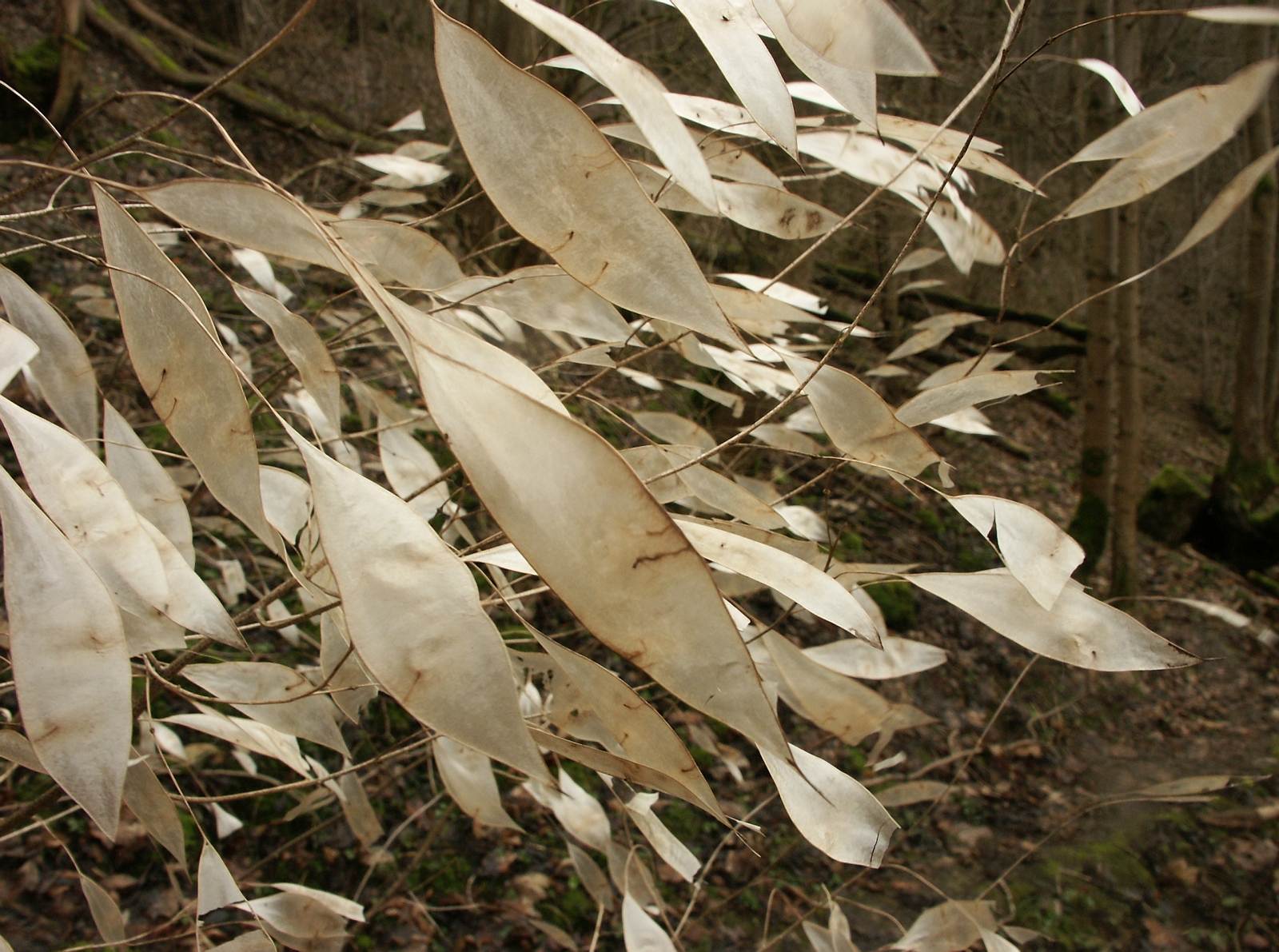
