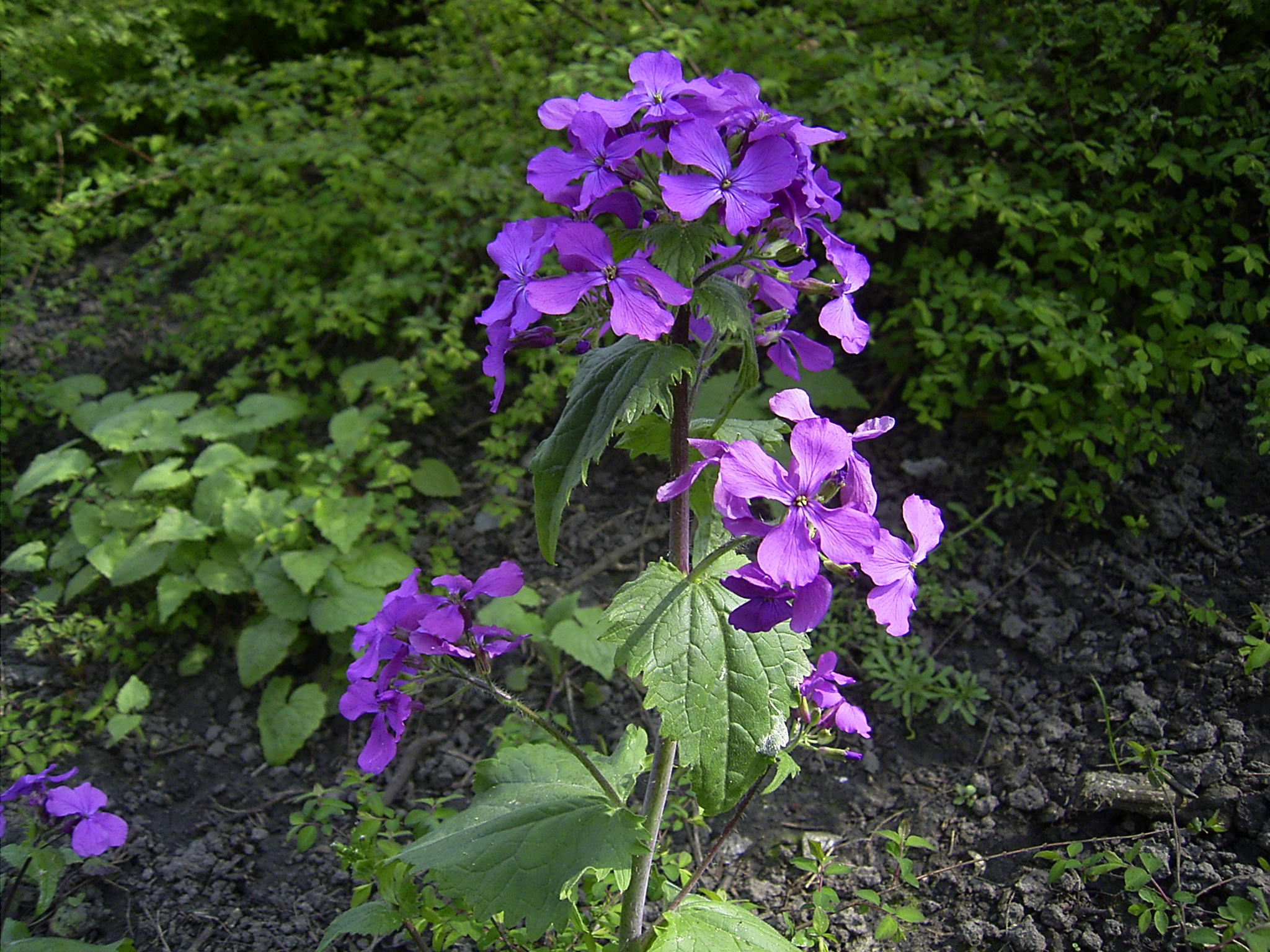

Scientific classification
- Kingdom: Plantae
- Clade: Embryophytes
- Clade: Tracheophytes
- Clade: Angiosperms
- Clade: Eudicots
- Clade: Rosids
- Order: Brassicales
- Family: Brassicaceae
- Genus: Lunaria
- Species: L. annua

Binomial name
- Lunaria annua L.

Synonyms
- List: Crucifera lunaria E.H.L.Krause; Lunaria annua f. elliptica (Schur) Beck; Lunaria annua var. oppositifolia Cheshm.; Lunaria annua f. orbiculata (Schur) Beck; Lunaria biennis Moench; Lunaria biennis var. elliptica Schur; Lunaria biennis var. orbiculata Schur; Lunaria inodora Lam.; Viola lunaria Garsault

= Lunaria annua =

Species of flowering plant

Lunaria annua, commonly called honesty or annual honesty, is a species of flowering plant in the cabbage and mustard family Brassicaceae. It is native to southern Europe, and cultivated throughout the temperate world.

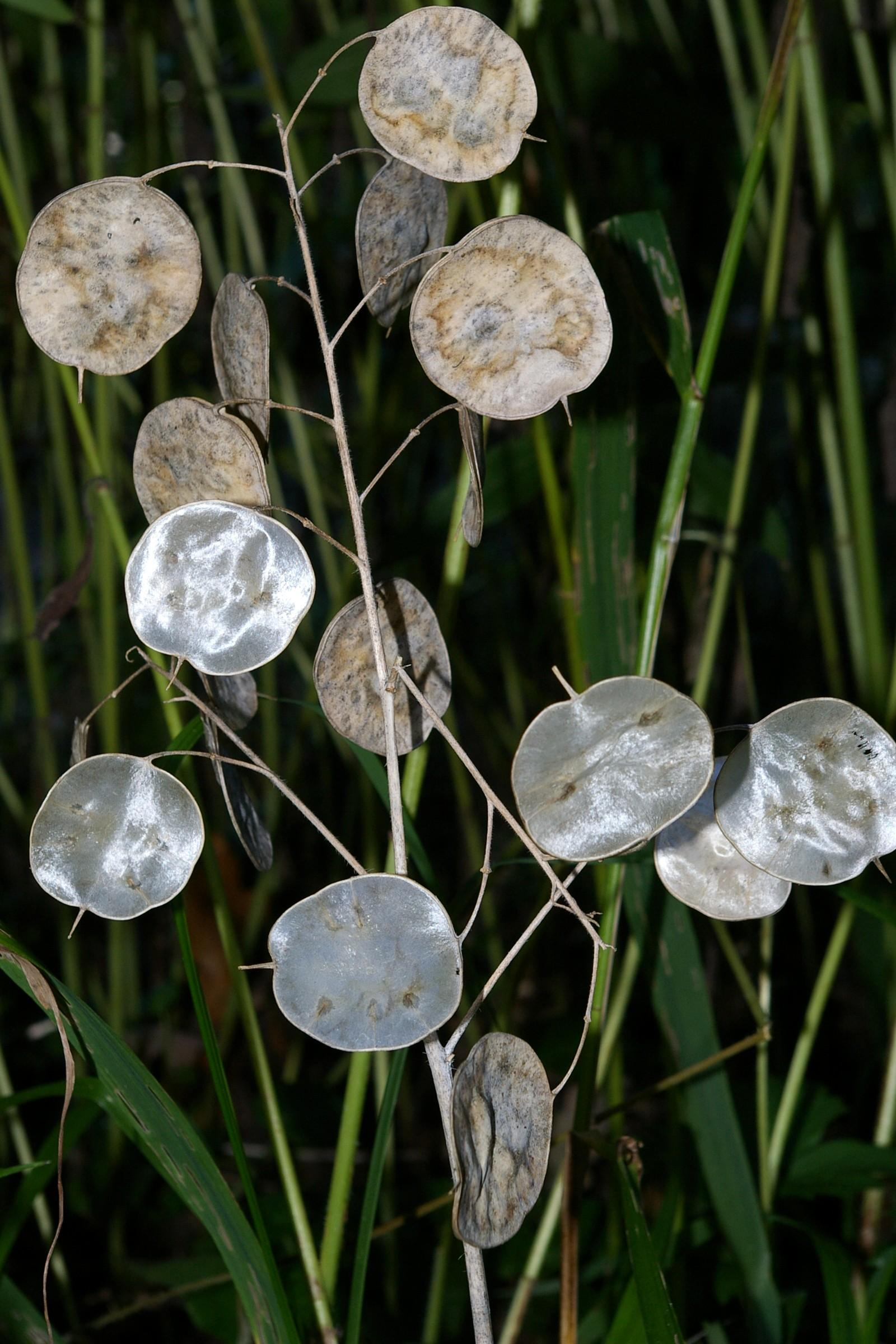
Ripe pods (siliques), some with seeds visible, some with only the central membrane remaining

== Description ==
It is an annual or biennial growing to 90 cm (35 in) tall by 30 cm (12 in) broad, with large, coarse, pointed oval leaves with marked serrations. The leaves are hairy, the lower ones long-stalked, the upper ones stalkless. In spring and summer it bears terminal racemes of white, pink or violet flowers, followed by a kind of showy, green-through-light-brown, translucent, disc-shaped silique called a sillicle (not true botanical seedpods), sometimes called moonpennies. When a silique is ripe and dry, a valve on each of its sides readily falls off, and its seeds fall off a central membrane which has a silvery sheen, 3–8 cm (1–3 in) in diameter; the membrane can persist on a plant throughout a winter depending on the weather. These sillicles are much used in dry floral arrangements.

== Distribution ==
Lunaria annua is native to southern Europe from Spain to Romania, and has been introduced to many other parts of the world with temperate climates.

== Names ==
The Latin name lunaria means 'moon-shaped' and refers to the shape and appearance of this species' siliques. The common name "honesty" arose in the 16th century and relates to the translucence of its silique membranes, which "truthfully" reveal their contents. Additional English names include money plant, moneywort, penny flower, silver dollar, and money-in-both-pockets, Chinese money, or Chinese coins. These, too, reference the silique membranes, which have the appearance of silvery coins. In French, it is known as monnaie du pape ("Pope's money"). In Denmark it is known as judaspenge and in Dutch-speaking countries as judaspenning (both meaning "coins of Judas"), an allusion to the story of Judas Iscariot and the thirty pieces of silver he was paid for betraying Christ.

== Symbolism ==
According to the Victorian era language of flowers published by American Sarah Josepha Hale, the plant represents fascination or sentiment. In other systems its meanings include honesty and money. In witchcraft, the honesty plant is considered protective, being thought to keep away monsters, evil spirits, and demons. The plant is also used in spells for prosperity, the flat pods (when ripe and silvery) resembling coins and therefore being seen as symbolising promises of wealth. In the earliest surviving recipe for a flying ointment (recorded by Bavarian physician Johannes Hartlieb circa 1440), Lunaria is included as the herbal ingredient corresponding astrologically to the moon and therefore to be picked on the lunar day of Monday.

== Cultivation ==
This plant is easy to grow from seed and tends to naturalize. It is usually grown as a biennial, being sown one year to flower the next. It is suitable for cultivation in a shady or dappled area, or in a wildflower garden, and the flowers and dried siliques are often seen in flower arrangements. Numerous varieties and cultivars are available, of which the white-flowered L. annua var. albiflora and the variegated white L. annua var. albiflora 'Alba Variegata' have won the Royal Horticultural Society's Award of Garden Merit.

== Gallery ==
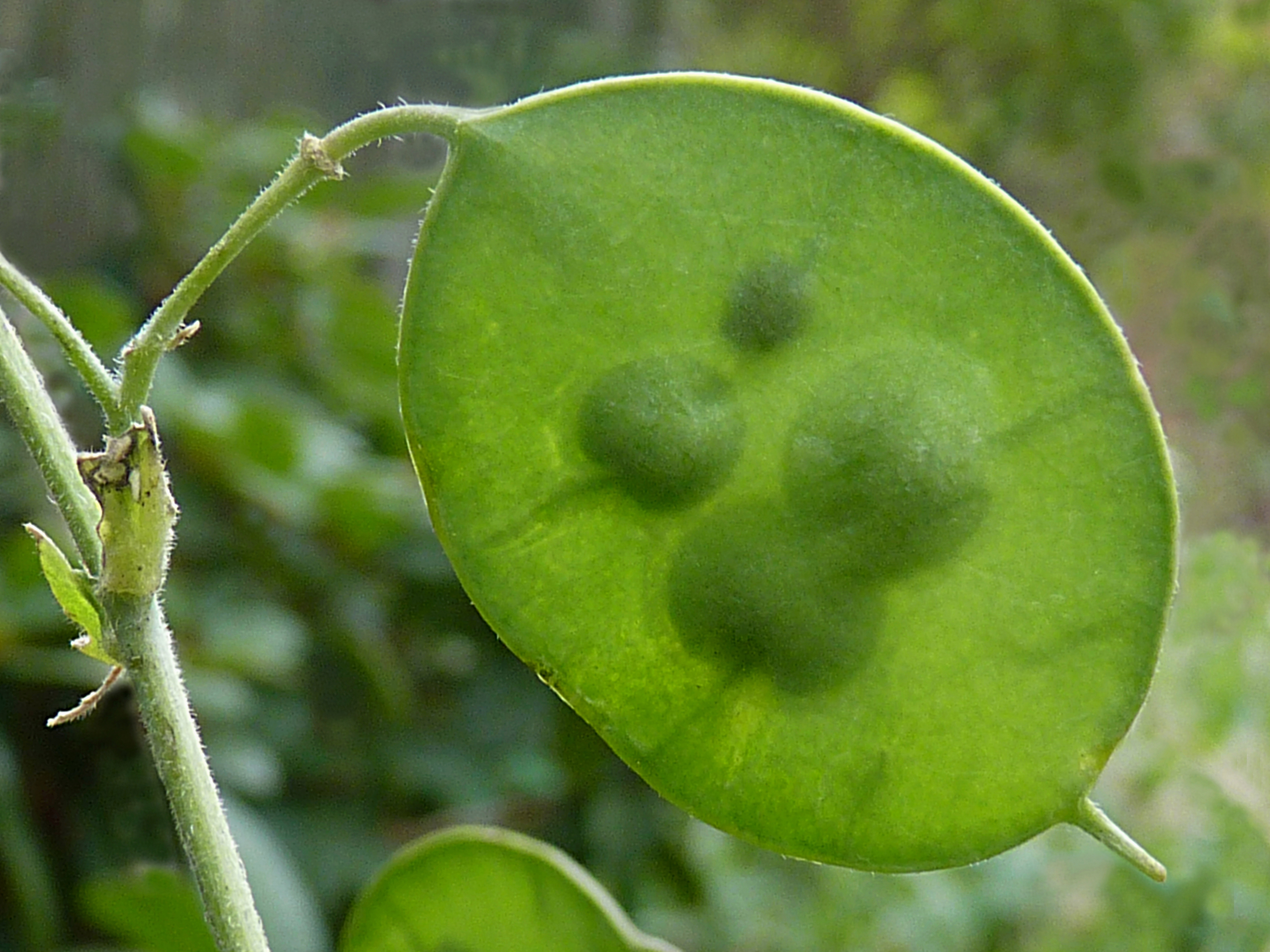
Unripe seedpod in July

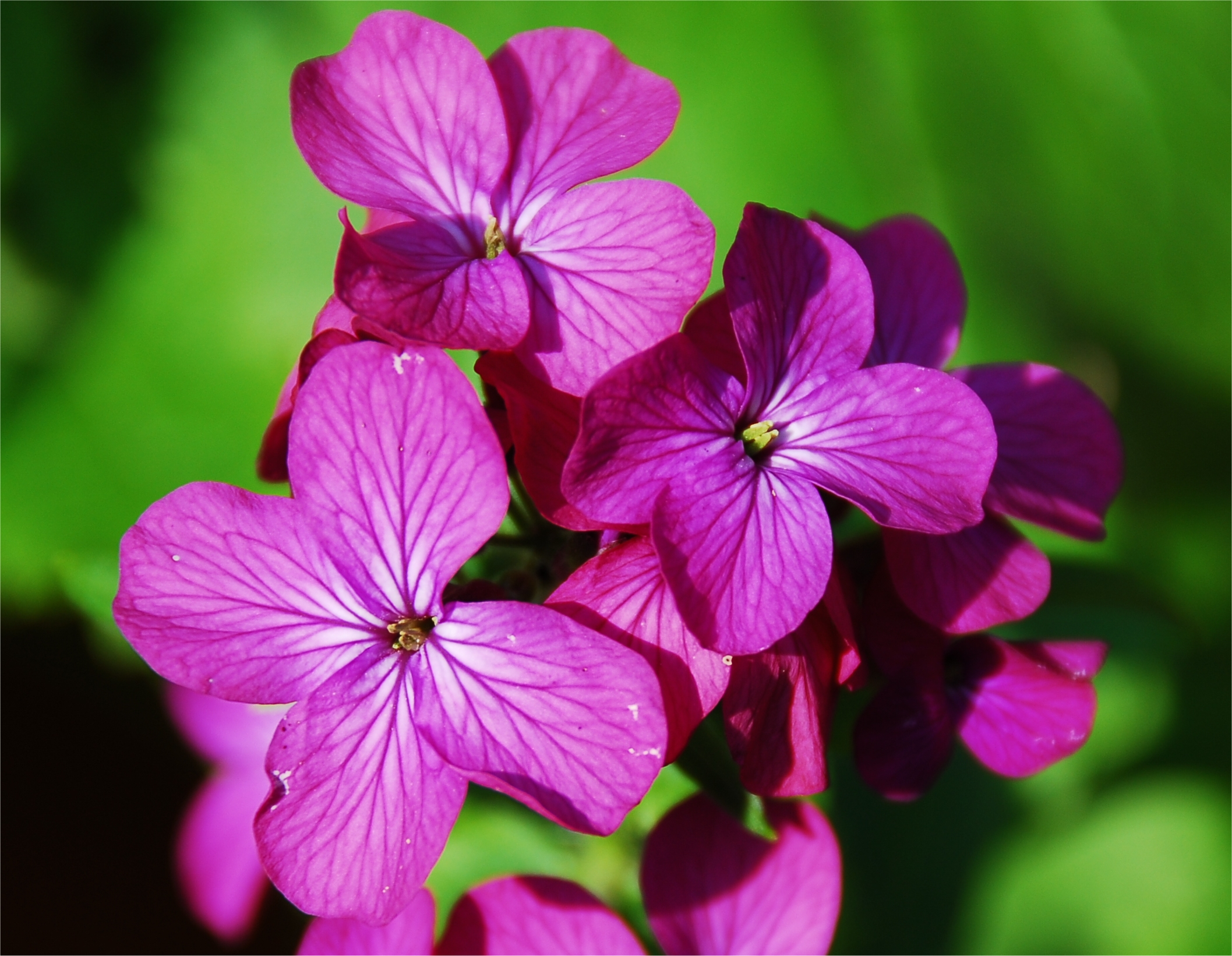
Detail of flower

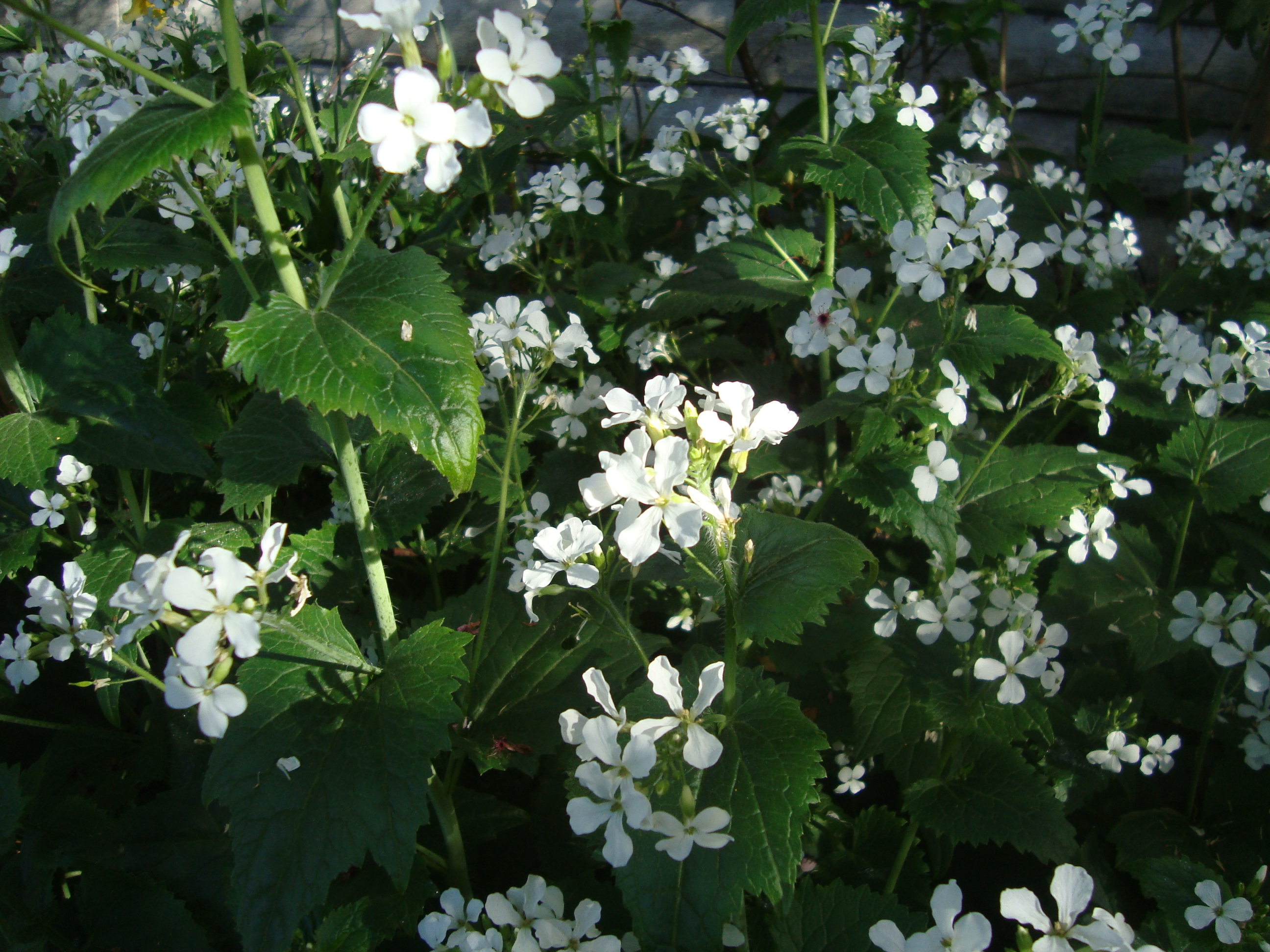
White-flowered form

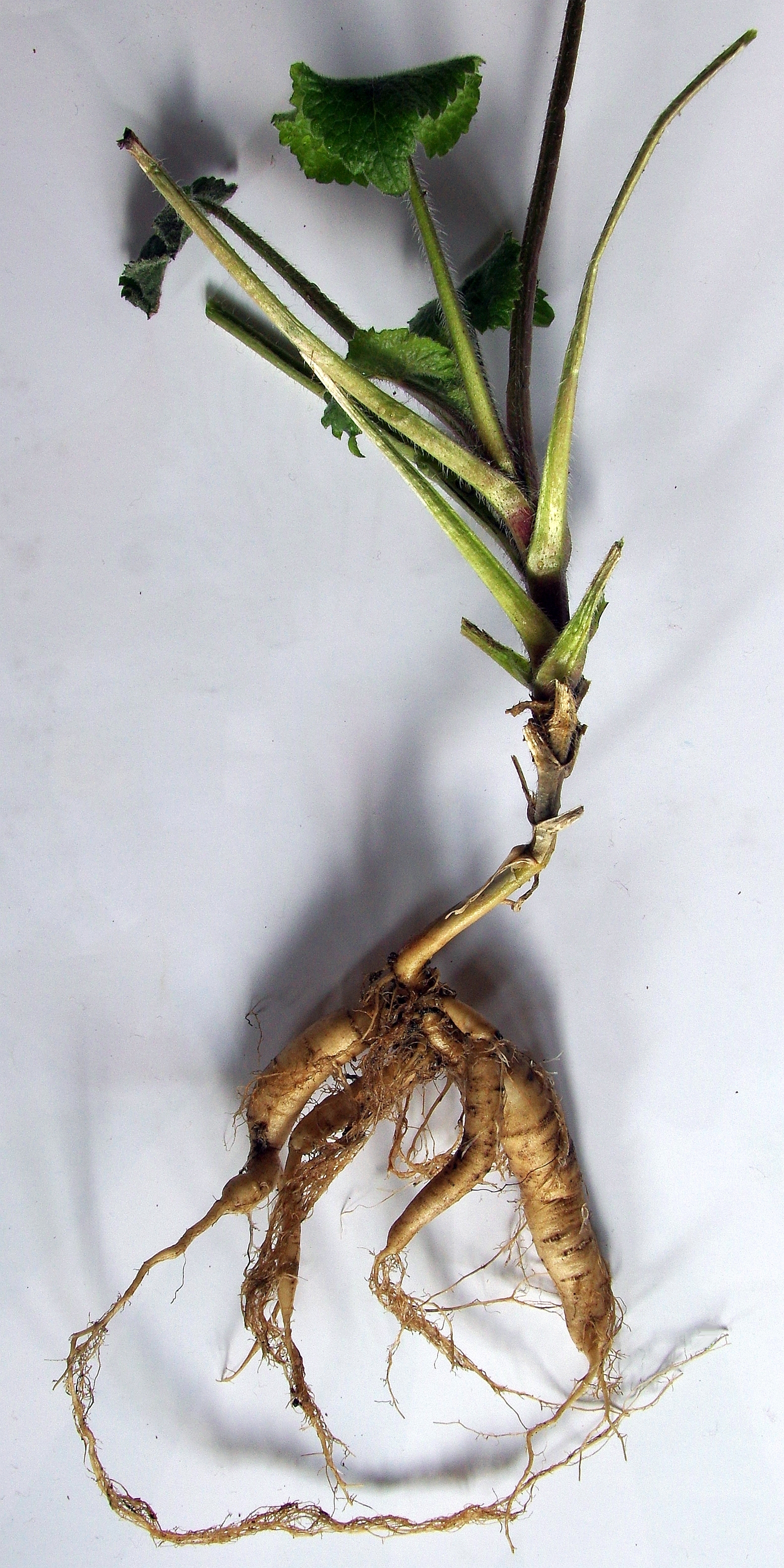
Storage roots at the end of first growth period

== See also ==
- Dame's violet, Hesperis matronalis, a similar and related plant, but with long cylindrical seedpods instead of flat papery disks
- Lunaria rediviva, perennial honesty
- Pilea peperomioides, another plant known colloquially as the Chinese money plant
