= Money plant =

Money plant may refer to several species, including:

| Epipremnum aureum – a tropical vining plant, in the Araceae, found in Northern Australia through Southeast Asia into China, Japan, Bangladesh, India and Pakistan. |
| Hydrocotyle vulgaris – a small, creeping, perennial, aquatic herb native to Europe, North Africa and West Asia. |
| Lunaria – herbaceous biennials in Brassicaceae, grown for their attractive spring flowering and dried silver seed pod middles, also referred to as "money tree" and "silver dollar plant", because the seedpods resemble a large coin. |
| Crassula ovata – a small plant with fleshy leaves in the Crassulaceae, also known as a jade plant or a friendship tree |
| Pilea peperomioides – a small plant in the Urticaceae, with very round, dark green leaves, also known as Chinese Money Plant, Lefse Plant, or Missionary Plant and is from the south of China |
| Pachira aquatica – a tropical wetland tree of the mallow family Malvaceae, native to Central and South America, known by a variety of common names including Malabar chestnut, French Peanut and provision tree, and is commercially sold under the names money tree and money plant. |

== See also ==
- Money tree
