= The Moneytree =

- Poster
- Directed by: Alan Dienstag
- Produced by: Christopher Dienstag
- Starring: Christopher Dienstag; Monica T. Caldwell
- Cinematography: Donatello Bonato
- Edited by: Susan Crutcher
- Music by: Lorin Rowan
- Release date: 1992
- Running time: 94 mins
- Country: United States
- Language: English

The Moneytree is an independent film that had a limited theatrical release in 1992 in the United States. It received reviews in several publications such as the Los Angeles Times, New York Times and the San Francisco Chronicle.

The Money Tree depicts the life of a Northern California marijuana grower during the Reagan years. David can't find work as an actor so he uses his mountain property located outside San Francisco to grow the illegal weed. His wealthy girl friend Erica disdains David's agrarian avocation and offers him a great opportunity to work for her father, but only if he stops growing weed. David loves growing pot and so turns her down. As his latest crop slowly matures, David has close scrapes with the law and brutal drug dealers. He also frequently argues for the legalization of marijuana with his friends and colleagues.

Black Sheep Films worked on a re-release of The Moneytree on April 20, 2012 with a new soundtrack and edit.

== References in popular culture ==
Arctic Monkeys reference the film in their song One Point Perspective in their 2018 album Tranquility Base Hotel & Casino, noting the film for its opening scene and impressive score.
