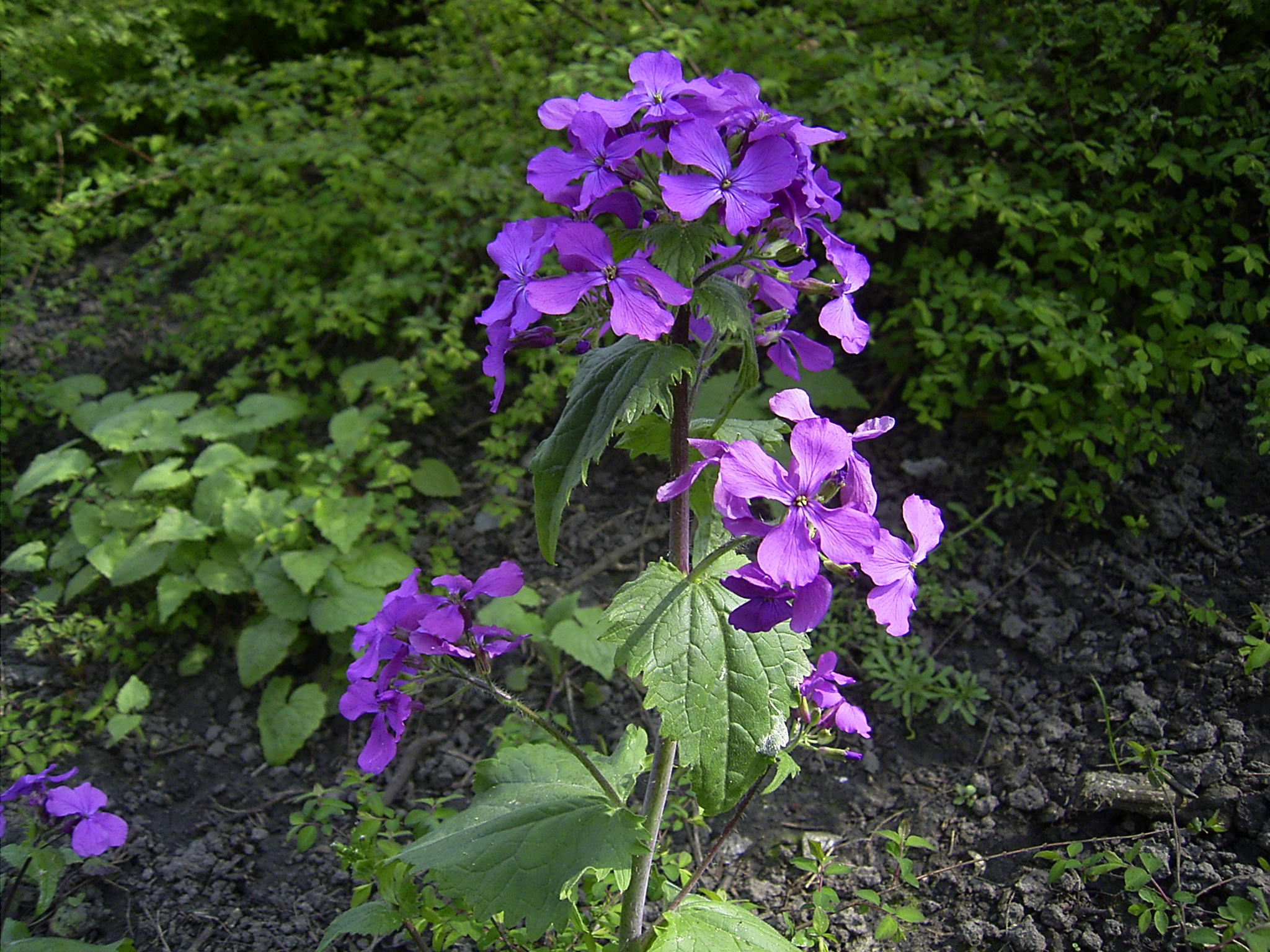
- L. annua

Scientific classification
- Kingdom: Plantae
- Clade: Embryophytes
- Clade: Tracheophytes
- Clade: Spermatophytes
- Clade: Angiosperms
- Clade: Eudicots
- Clade: Rosids
- Order: Brassicales
- Family: Brassicaceae
- Genus: Lunaria; L.

Species
- Lunaria annua - annual honesty Lunaria rediviva - perennial honesty Lunaria telekiana

= Lunaria =

Genus of flowering plants in the cabbage family

Lunaria is a genus of flowering plants in the family Brassicaceae. It is native to Europe and has been introduced to North America and elsewhere. Species include:

- L. annua (syn. L. biennis), annual or biennial
- L. rediviva, perennial
- L. telekiana. rare Balkan species

The Latin name Lunaria means "moon-like" and refers to the plants' decorative seedpods.

They have hairy toothed leaves and terminal racemes of white or violet flowers in Spring and Summer, followed by prominent, translucent, disc-shaped seedpods, which are frequently seen in flower arrangements.

They are widely grown as ornamental plants in gardens, and have become naturalised in many temperate areas away from their native habitat.

== Gallery ==
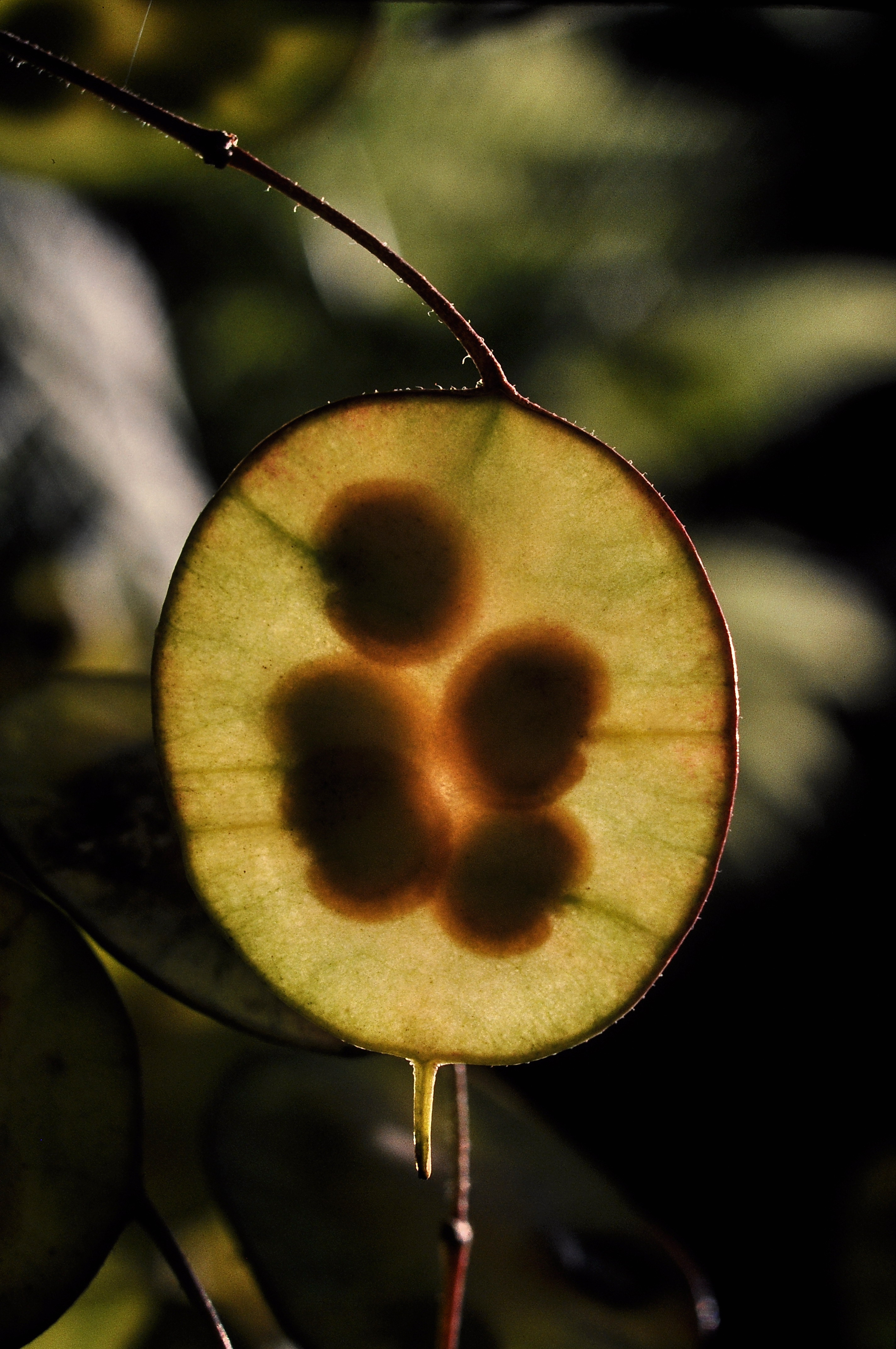
L. annua, with seeds

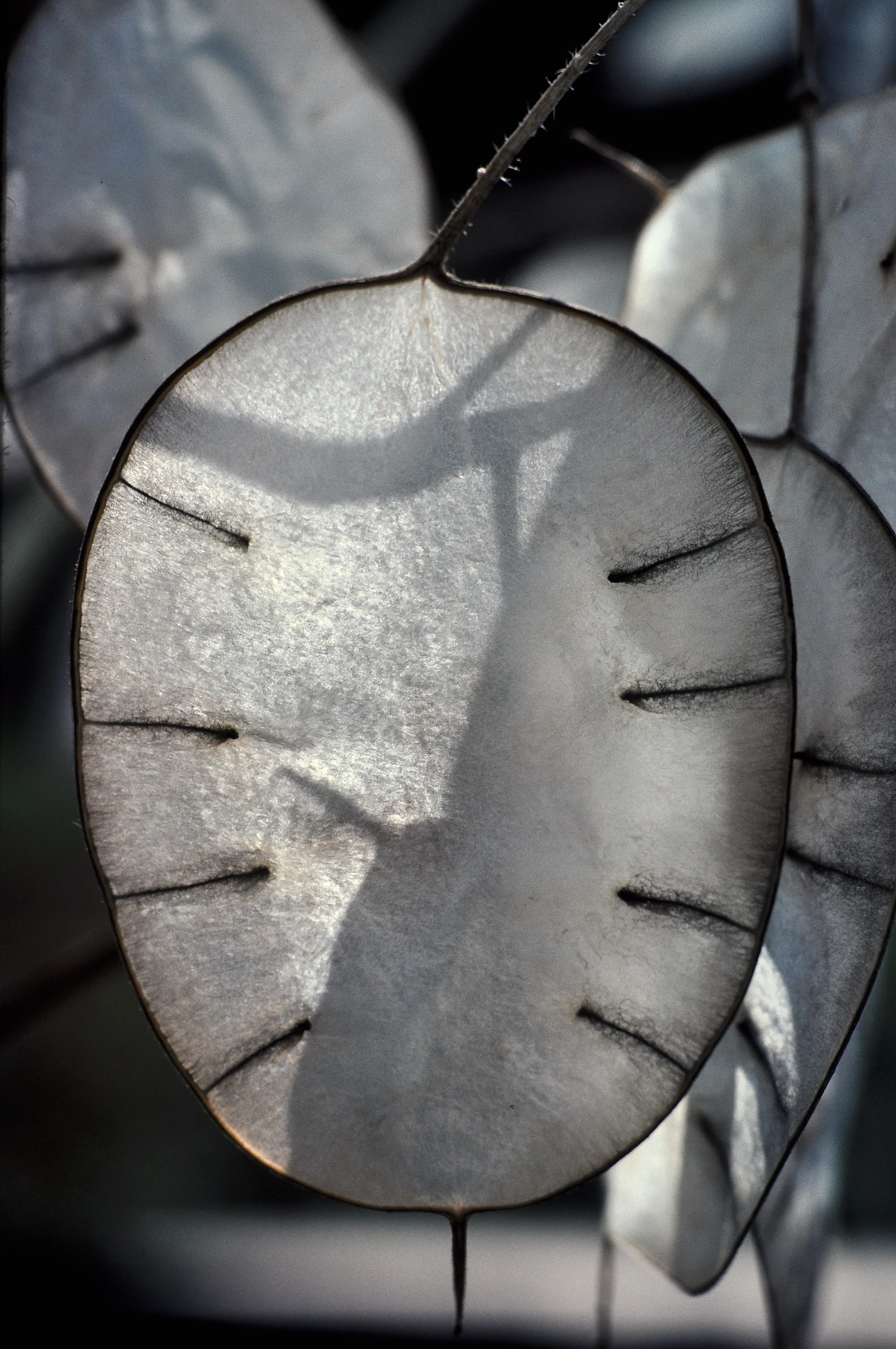
L. annua, without seeds

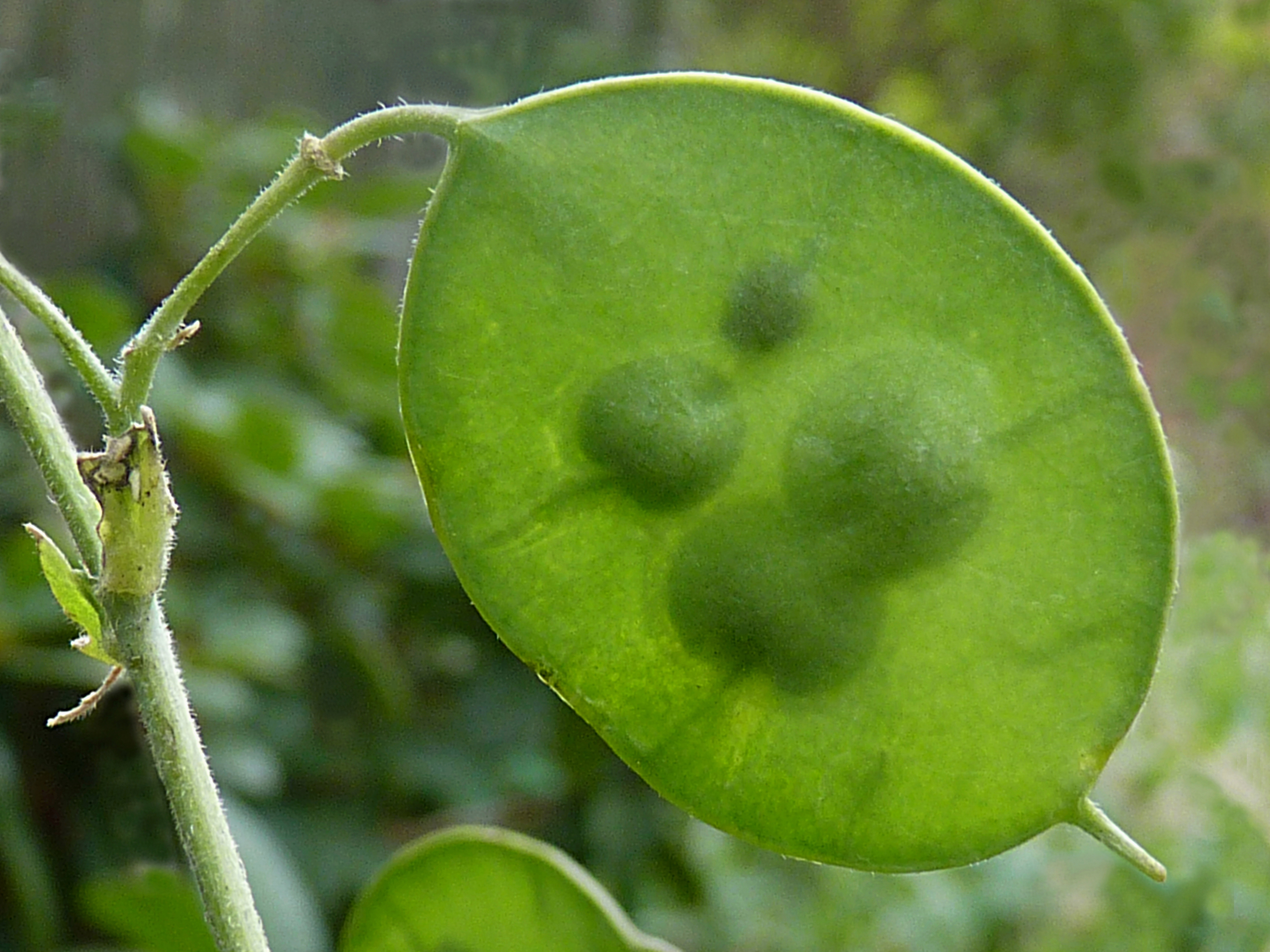
L. annua, unripe seedpod in July

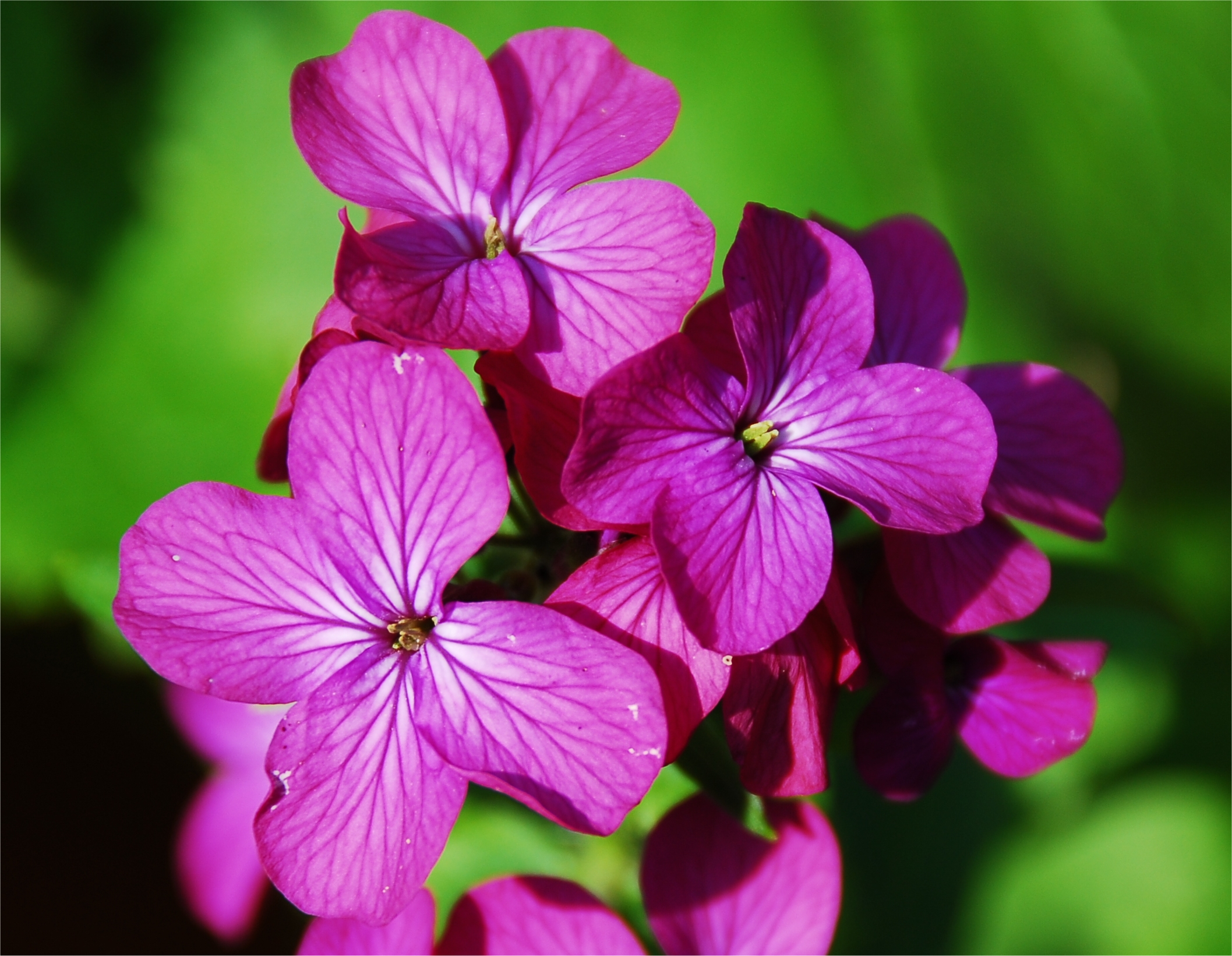
Detail of flower,
L. annua

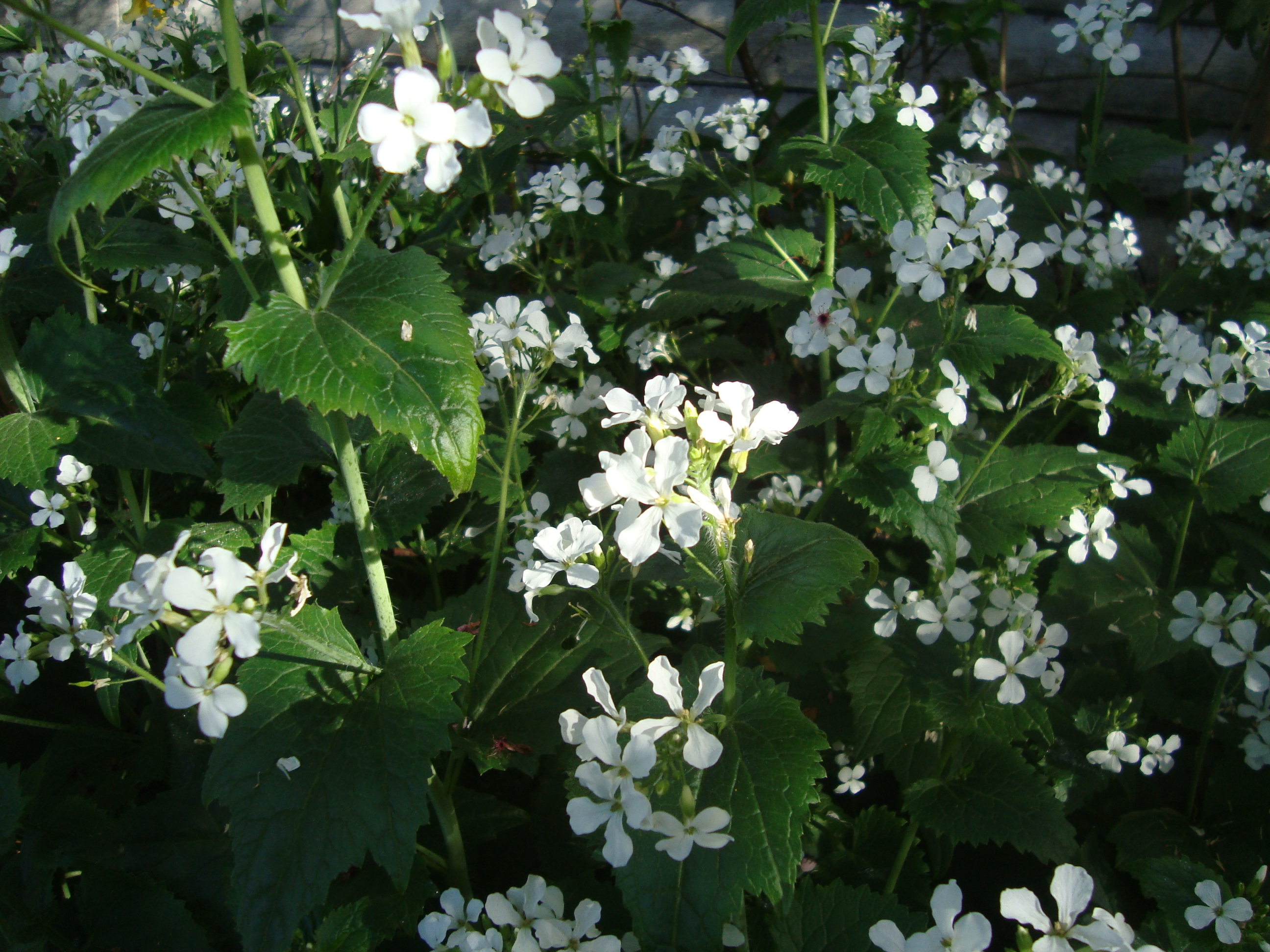
White-flowered form,
L. annua

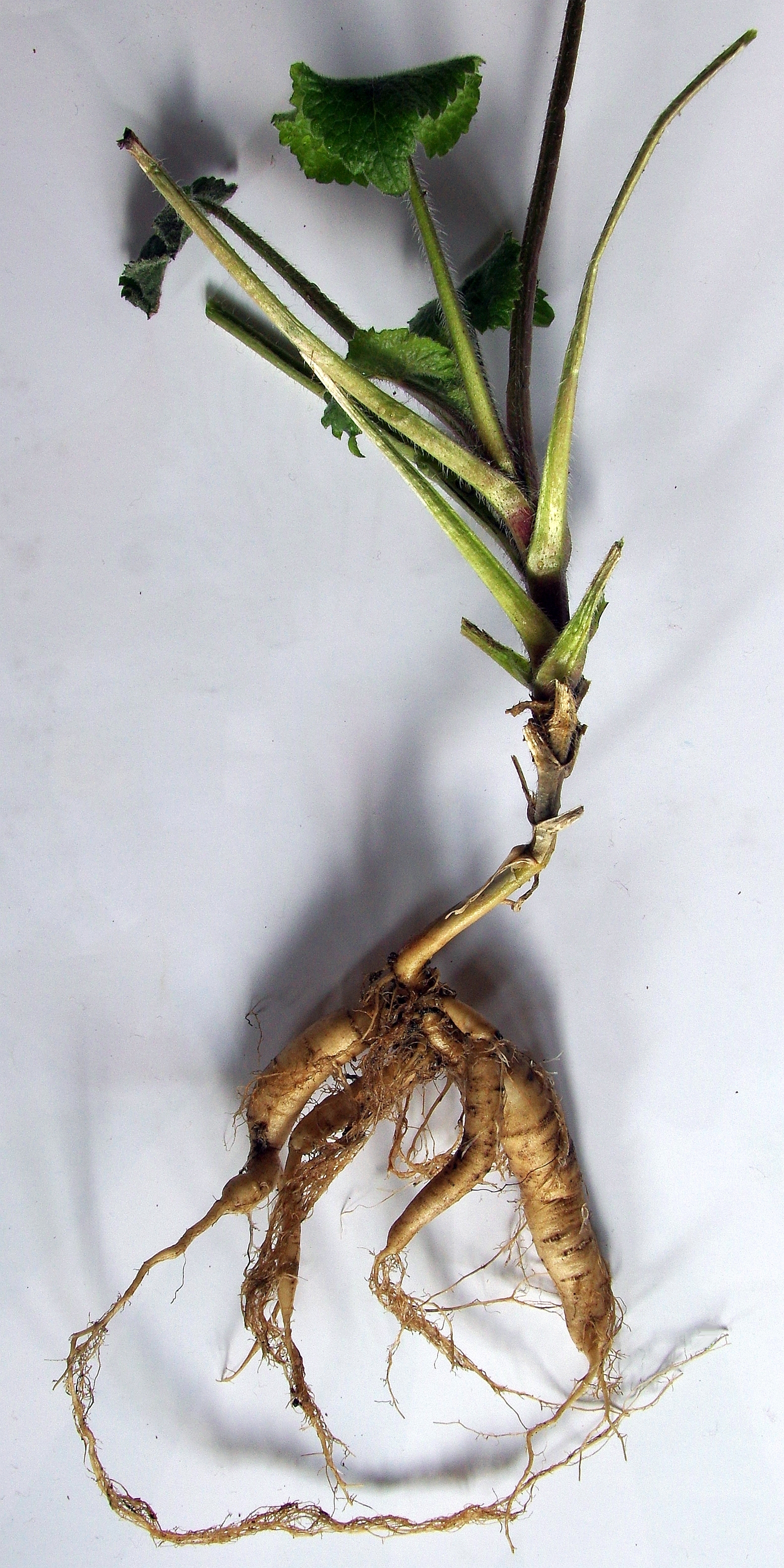
Storage roots at the end of first growth period,
L. annua

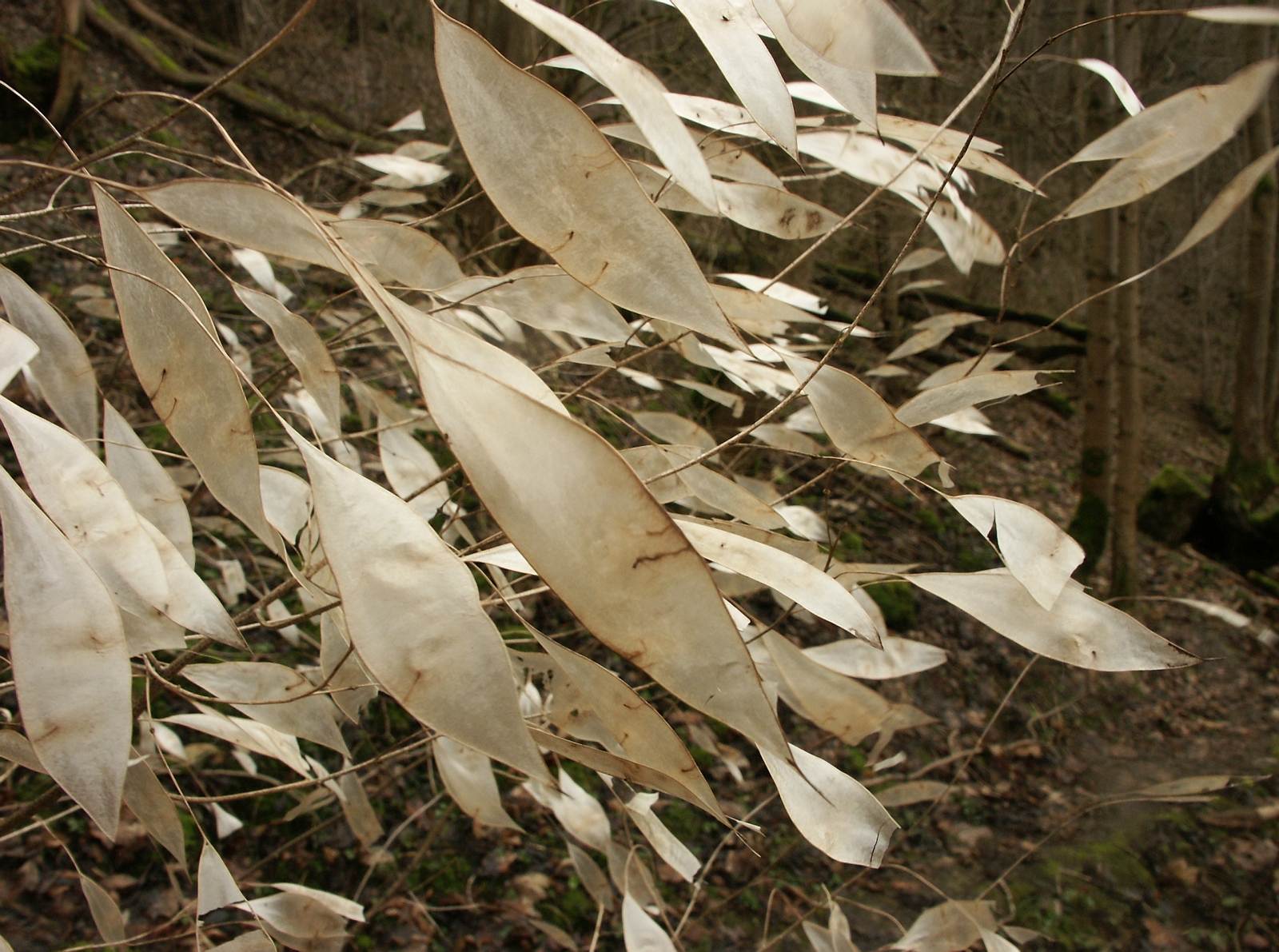
L. rediviva

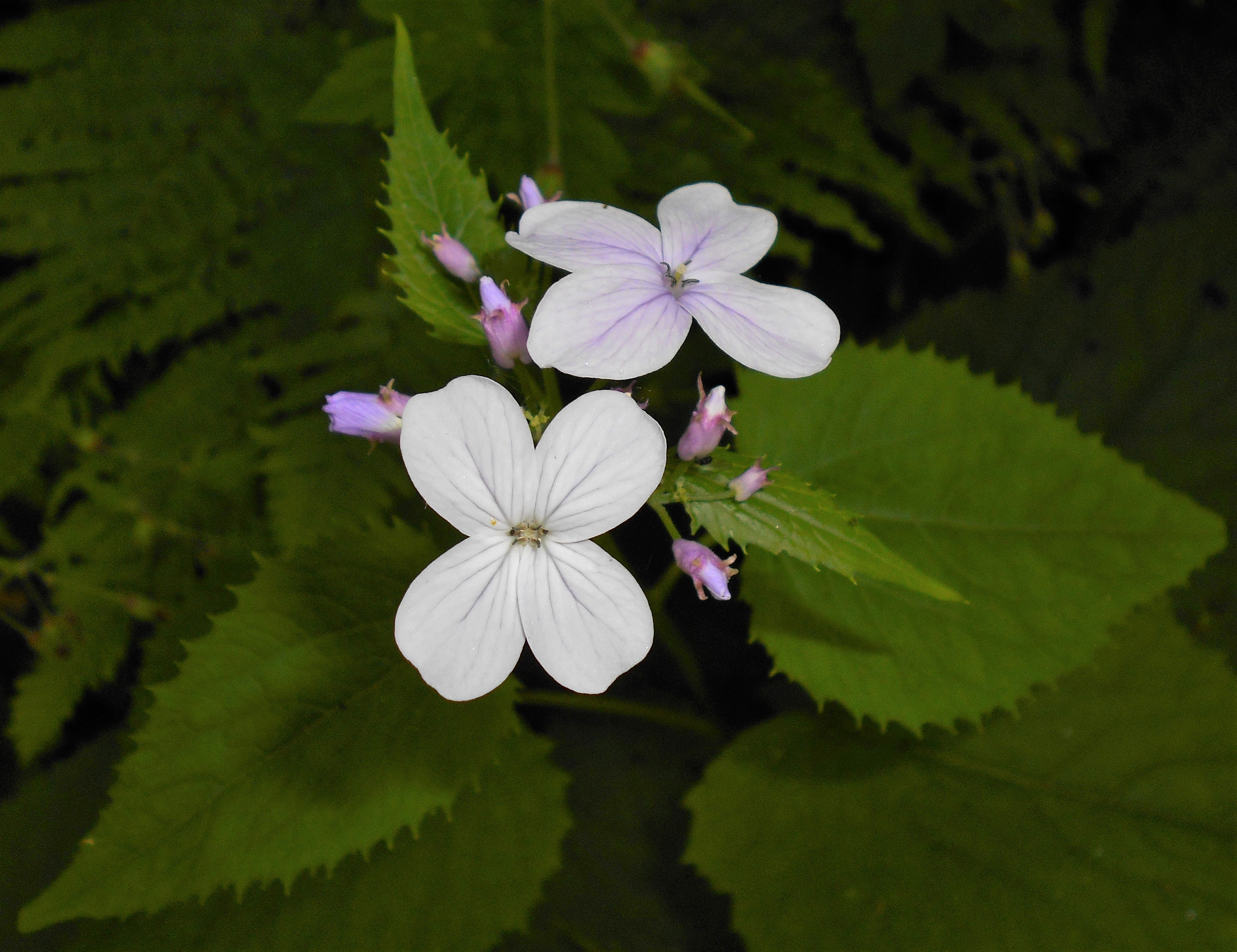
L. rediviva

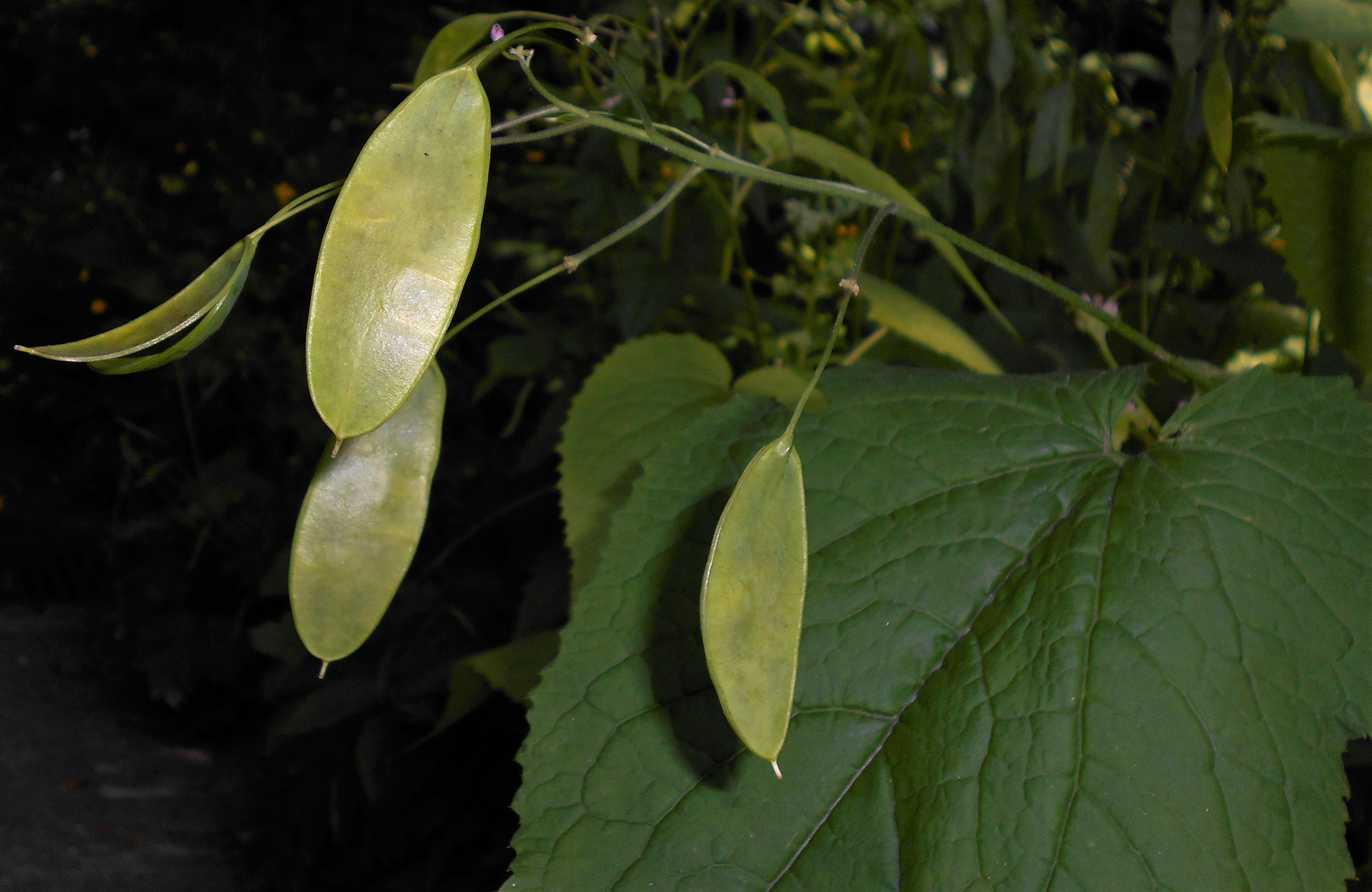
L. rediviva

== See also ==
- Money plant
