= Web =

Web most often refers to:

- Spider web, a silken structure created by the animal
- World Wide Web or the Web, an Internet-based hypertext system

Web, WEB, or the Web may also refer to:

== Computing ==
- Web (programming system), a literate programming system created by Donald Knuth
- GNOME Web, a Web browser
- Web.com, a web-design company
- Webs (web hosting), a Web hosting and website building service
- Web hosting service

== Engineering ==
- Web (manufacturing), continuous sheets of material passed over rollers
  - Web, a roll of paper in offset printing
- Web, the vertical element of an I-beam or a rail profile
- Web, the interior beams of a truss

== Films ==
- Web (2013 film), a documentary
- Webs (film), a 2003 science-fiction movie
- The Web (film), a 1947 film noir

== Literature ==
- Web (character), an MLJ comicbook character (created 1942)
- Web (novel), by John Wyndham (1979)
- World English Bible, a public-domain Bible translation (2000)

== Mathematics ==
- Web (differential geometry), a type of set allowing an intrinsic Riemannian-geometry characterisation of the additive separation of variables in the Hamilton–Jacobi equation
- Web, a linear system of divisors of dimension 3

== Music ==
- WEB Entertainment, a record label
- Web (album), 1995, by Bill Laswell and Terre Thaemlitz
- "The Web", a song by Marillion from Script for a Jester's Tear
- "The Web", a song by Neurosis from Souls at Zero
- "The Web", a song by Zao from The Crimson Corridor
- The Web (band), a British jazz/blues band active in the late 1960s and early 1970s

== People ==
- W. E. B. Du Bois (1868–1963), American sociologist and civil rights activist
- Warren Edward Buffett (born 1930), American business magnate and investor

== Radio ==
- WEBS (AM), a station licensed to Calhoun, Georgia, US
- West End Broadcast (WeB FM), a station in Newcastle, England, that was a forerunner of NE1fm

== Television ==
- The Web (1950 TV series), a 1950–1954 American mystery/suspense anthology television series that was broadcast on CBS
- The Web (1957 TV series), an American mystery/suspense anthology television series, similar to the 1950–1954 series, that aired on NBC in 1957 as a summer replacement series
- W.E.B., a 1978 American TV series
- The Web, a fictional region of space in the ReBoot television series (and game)
- "Web", an episode of season 7 of Law & Order: Special Victims Unit
- "The Web", an episode of Blake's 7
- "The Web", an episode of The Amazing World of Gumball

== Other uses ==
- West-East Bag, an international women artists network active from 1971 to 1973

== See also ==
- Cobweb (disambiguation)
- Spider Web (disambiguation)
- Webb (disambiguation)
- Webbing, a strong woven fabric
- Webbed feet, animal feet with membranes of skin between the digits
  - Interdigital webbing in mammals
  - Webbed toes in humans
- Webbed, a 2021 video game
- Webby (disambiguation)
- WWW (disambiguation)
