= Welcome-home-husband-though-never-so-drunk =

Welcome-home-husband-though-never-so-drunk is a common name for several succulent plants and may refer to:

- Sedum acre
- Sempervivum tectorum
