= Cobweb (disambiguation) =

A cobweb is a spider web.

Cobweb may also refer to:

== Animals ==
- Cobweb (horse) (1821–1848), a racehorse
- Cobwebbing, a pattern of fine lines on the face of a horse, zebra or other equid

== Films ==
- Cobweb (1936 film), Hungarian comedy film
- Cobweb (2023 American film), American horror film
- Cobweb (2023 South Korean film), South Korean film

== Literature ==
- Cobweb (comics), a comic book heroine
- Cobweb, a character in A Midsummer Night's Dream by William Shakespeare
- The Cobweb (novel), by Stephen Bury (a pseudonym), 1996

== Music ==
- Cobweb (band), a Nepalese hard rock group formed in 1993
- "Cobwebs", 2007, by the Coral from Roots & Echoes
- "Cobwebs", 1995, by Loudon Wainwright III from Grown Man
- "Cobwebs", 2010, by Motionless in White from Creatures
- "Cobwebs", 2008, by Ryan Adams & the Cardinals from Cardinology

== Other uses ==
- Cobwebs (audio drama), an audio drama based on Doctor Who
- Cobweb (clustering) (or COBWEB), a system for machine learning
- Cobweb, a British boat in the 1908 Summer Olympics

== See also ==
- The Cobweb (disambiguation)
- Cobweb Bridge or Spider Bridge, a bridge in Sheffield, South Yorkshire, England
- Cobweb model, an economic model of cyclical supply and demand
- Cobweb plot, a visual tool used in the dynamical systems field of mathematics to investigate the qualitative behaviour of one-dimensional iterated functions
- Cobweb spider or tangle web spider, any spider in the family Theridiidae
- Cobweb theory, an alternative to the state-centric approach to international relations
- Cobweb houseleek (Sempervivum arachnoideum)
- Spider Web (disambiguation)
- Cob (disambiguation)
- Web (disambiguation)
