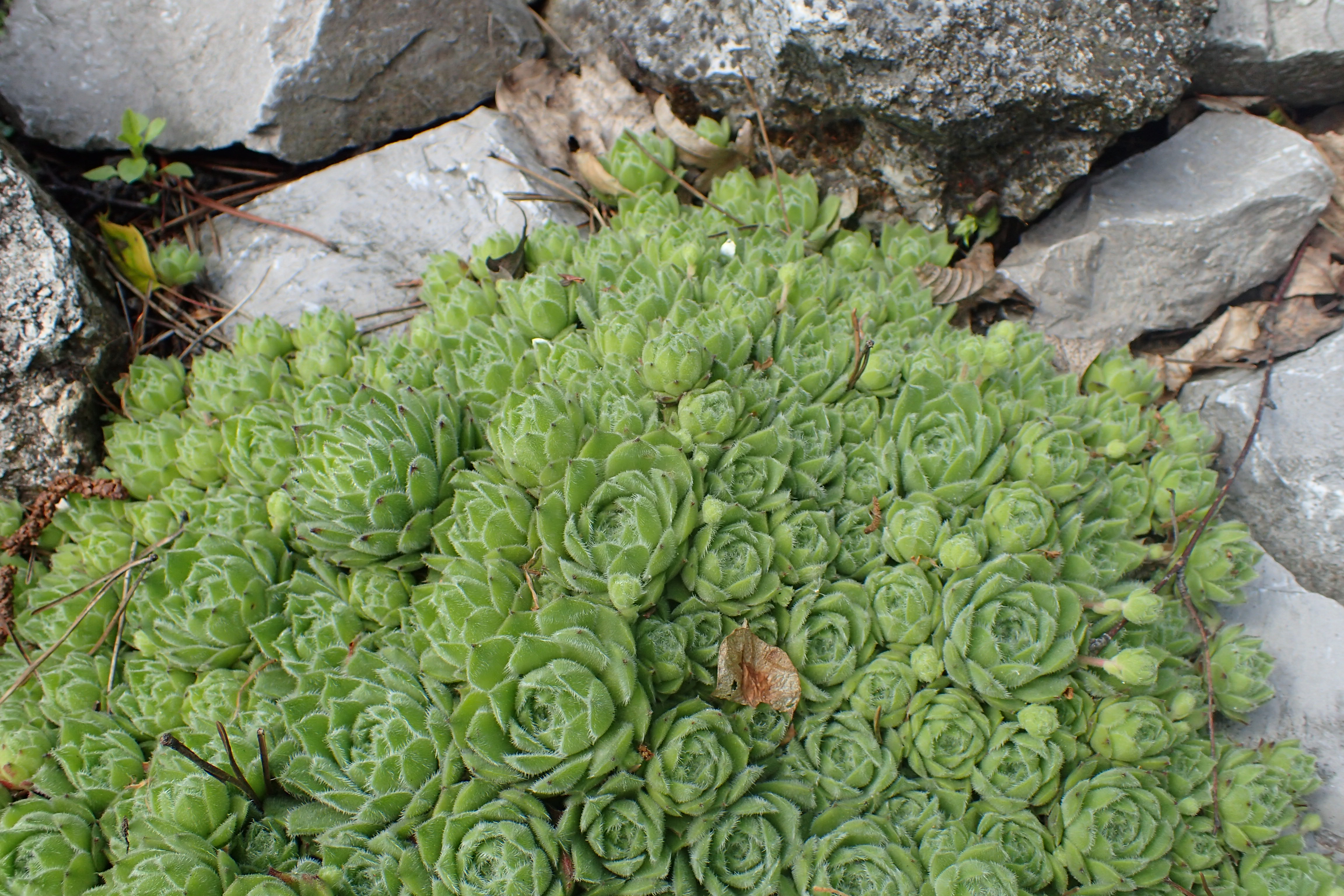
- Habit

Scientific classification
- Kingdom: Plantae
- Clade: Tracheophytes
- Clade: Angiosperms
- Clade: Eudicots
- Order: Saxifragales
- Family: Crassulaceae
- Genus: Sempervivum
- Species: S. × giuseppii

Binomial name
- Sempervivum × giuseppii Wale

= Sempervivum × giuseppii =

Hybrid species of flowering plant

Sempervivum × giuseppii, the roof houseleek, is a naturally occurring hybrid species of flowering plant in the family Crassulaceae, native to northwest Spain. Its parents are Sempervivum arachnoideum and Sempervivum cantabricum. A succulent, cold-hardy to USDA zone 7, it has gained the Royal Horticultural Society's Award of Garden Merit.
