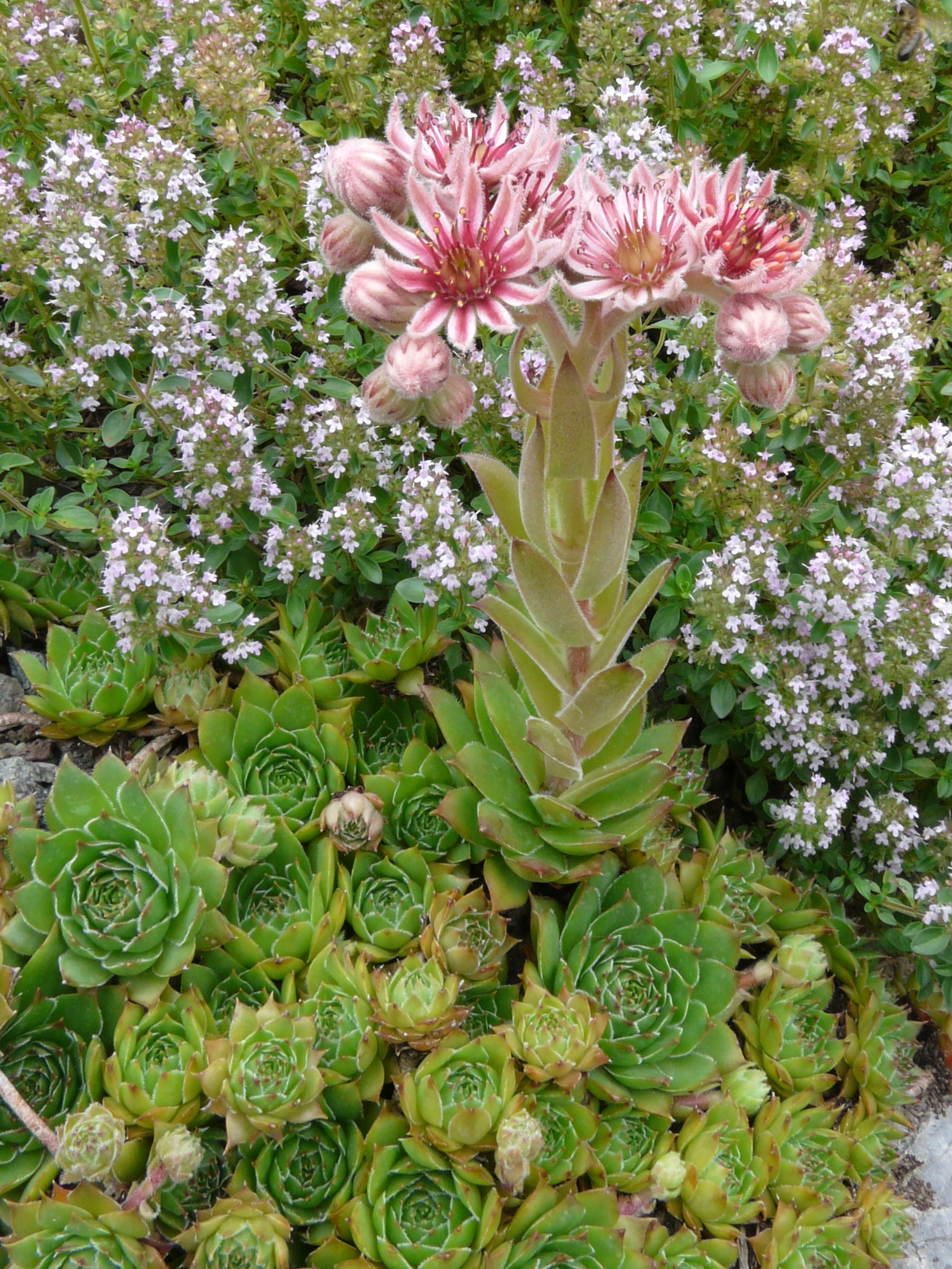

Conservation status
- Least Concern (IUCN 3.1)

Scientific classification
- Kingdom: Plantae
- Clade: Tracheophytes
- Clade: Angiosperms
- Clade: Eudicots
- Order: Saxifragales
- Family: Crassulaceae
- Genus: Sempervivum
- Species: S. marmoreum

Binomial name
- Sempervivum marmoreum Griseb.

= Sempervivum marmoreum =

Species of succulent

Sempervivum marmoreum is a species of flowering plant in the family Crassulaceae. It is a succulent native to south-eastern Europe (Bulgaria, Romania, Greece, North Macedonia, Serbia, etc.) and central Europe (Hungary, Slovakia). Sempervivum marmoreum naturally grows on rocky outcrops with southern exposure.

== Main subspecies ==
- Sempervivum marmoreum subsp. marmoreum (Balkans, Romania)
- Sempervivum marmoreum subsp. blandum
- Sempervivum marmoreum subsp. matricum (Hungary, Slovakia, Transylvania)
- Sempervivum marmoreum subsp. reginae-amaliae
