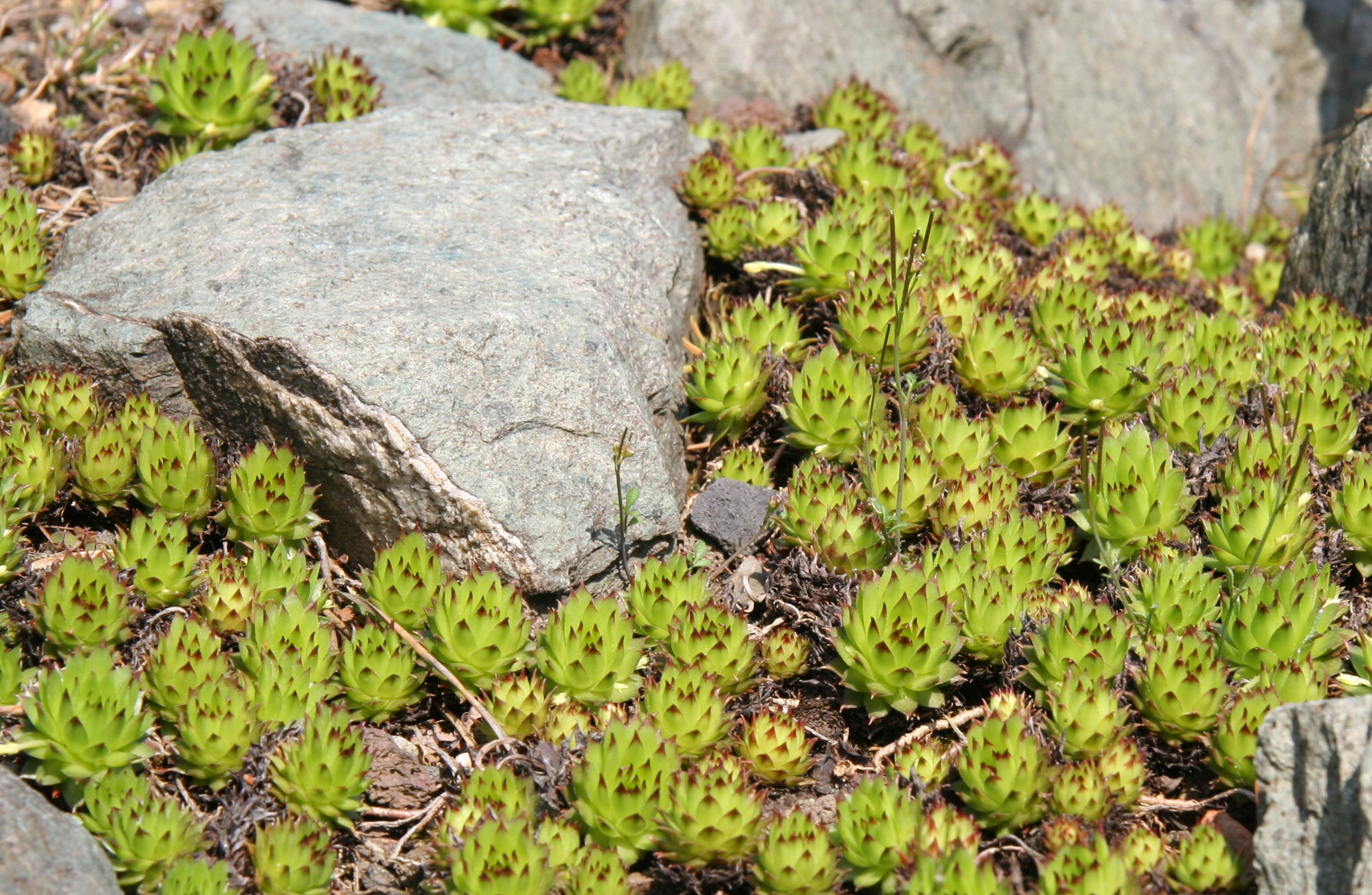

Scientific classification
- Kingdom: Plantae
- Clade: Tracheophytes
- Clade: Angiosperms
- Clade: Eudicots
- Order: Saxifragales
- Family: Crassulaceae
- Genus: Sempervivum
- Species: S. macedonicum

Binomial name
- Sempervivum macedonicum Praeger

= Sempervivum macedonicum =

Species of succulent

Sempervivum macedonicum is a perennial species of flowering plant in the family Crassulaceae. It is native to the Western Balkans.
