= Spider Web (disambiguation) =

A spider web is a silken web built by a spider.

Spider Web (or variations thereon) may also refer to:

== Film and television ==
- The Spider's Web (1926 film), an American silent film
- The Spider's Web (serial), 1938 Columbia Pictures film serial
- The Spider's Web (1960 film), 1960 film directed by Godfrey Grayson
- Web of the Spider, 1971 Italian horror film
- Spiderweb (film), 1976 short film starring Nigel Hawthorne
- Spider's Web (1982 film), a British television film based on Agatha Christie's play
- Spider's Web (1989 film), a West German film directed by Bernhard Wicki
- Spider's Web (2002 film), starring and produced by Kari Wuhrer
- "Spiderwebs" (Dawson's Creek), a 2002 television episode

== Music ==
- "Spiderwebs" (song), a 1995 song by No Doubt
- "Spider's Web" (song), a 2006 song by Katie Melua
- "Spider Web", a 1995 song by Joan Osborne from her album Relish
- "Spider Web", a 2023 song by Melanie Martinez from her album Portals

== Literature ==
- The Web of the Spider: A Tale of Adventure, an 1891 novel by H. B. Marriott Watson
- The Spider's Web, an Exposition of the Origin, Growth and Methods of German "World-Power"-madness, with Special Reference to Belgium, a 1915 non-fiction book by Raymond Colleye de Weerdt, published by the Iris Publishing Company
- The Spider's Web (German: Das Spinnennetz), a 1923 novel by Joseph Roth
- The Spider's Web, a 1945 novel by Winifred Duke
- Spider's Web (play), a 1954 play by Agatha Christie
  - Spider's Web (novel), a 2000 novelisation of the Agatha Christie play, by Charles Osborne
- The Spiderweb, a 1979 novel by Joseph E. Persico
- Web of the Spider, a 1981 novel by Richard K. Lyon and Andrew J. Offutt, the third installment in the War of the Wizards trilogy
- Spider Webs, a 1986 novel by Margaret Millar
- The Web of Spider, a 1989 novel by W. Michael Gear, the third installment in the Spider Trilogy
- The Spider's Web, a 1997 novel by Peter Berresford Ellis under the pseudonym Peter Tremayne, the fifth installment in the Sister Fidelma mystery series
- The Spider's Web, a 1999 novel by Nigel McCrery, the third novel based on the television series Silent Witness
- The Spider's Web, a 2010 novel by Margaret Coel, the fifteenth installment in the Wind River Reservation mystery series
- Spider Web, a 2011 novel by Earlene Fowler, the fifteenth installment in the Benni Harper series

== Other uses ==
- Spiderweb Software, an independent video game developer
- Operation Spider's Web, a military operation in the Russo-Ukrainian War

== See also ==
- Spider Webb (disambiguation), for a list of people nicknamed "Spider Webb"
- Cobweb (disambiguation)
- Spider (disambiguation)
- Web (disambiguation)
- Web of Spider-Man, the title of two respective comic book series published by Marvel Comics since 1985
