= Sempervivum ciliosum =

Scientific classification
- Kingdom: Plantae
- Clade: Embryophytes
- Clade: Tracheophytes
- Clade: Angiosperms
- Clade: Eudicots
- Order: Saxifragales
- Family: Crassulaceae
- Genus: Sempervivum
- Species: S. ciliosum

Binomial name
- Sempervivum ciliosum Craib

Synonyms
- Sempervivum borisii Degen & Urum.

Species of succulent

Sempervivum ciliosum is a species of flowering plant in the succulent stonecrop family, Crassulaceae, native to the Balkans and Southeastern Europe. A colony-forming evergreen perennial plant, each individual rosette can grow to around 7.5 cm (3.0 in) high and wide, forming dense mats of up to 50 cm (20 in) wide.

Houseleeks produce multiple baby plantlets ('chicks') from the sides of a mature 'mother' ('hen') plant, which are attached by an 'umbilical cord'-like appendage until they take root and become reliably self-sufficient. A plantlet's goal is to take root and spread the colony, either by breaking themselves off of the mother plant via flooding events, erosion or animal damage, or by simply taking root wherever they happen to be. The leaves are a teal-green colour, slightly pointed, succulent and slightly hairy (an adaptation against sunburn).

Being a monocarpic (hapaxanth) plant, as are several other genera of succulents (such as aeoniums, agaves, and certain kalanchoes), it houseleek will eventually begin preparing to flower by turning its leaves inward and then up and out, changing form from a rosette plant into a flowering stalks up to 10 cm (3.9 in), topped with yellowish, star-shaped flowers.

The Latin specific epithet ciliosum means "with a small fringe".

Sempervivum ciliosum has gained the Royal Horticultural Society's Award of Garden Merit. Although hardy down to −20 °C (−4 °F), it requires a semi-sheltered position with several hours of full sun, in a well-drained and well-amended substrate, or even plain sphagnum moss. As they are native to rocky outcrops and cliff faces, houseleeks grow exceptionally well when displayed vertically—at times, better than in standard potting soil—, and thrive when mounted onto driftwood, rocks, wooden posts, trees, moss poles or other elevated structures, as this facilitates maximum drainage and aeration. This plant will not survive indoors or in excessively shady, stagnant conditions, nor in overly wet soils. In nature, houseleeks simply take root amidst the leaf litter and moss that has accumulated in-between and around rocks on exposed slopes. In these alpine locations, airflow, sunlight and drainage are optimal; any precipitation event that occurs is welcomed by the plant, but the water ideally drains-away quickly from the roots, lest root rot develops.
