= Spider Webb =

Spider Webb may refer to:

- Graham Webb (broadcaster) (1936–2024), Graham "Spider" Webb, an Australian radio and TV broadcaster and producer
- Travis Webb, Travis "Spider" Webb, American racecar driver
- Spider Webb (jazz drummer) (1944–2026), American jazz drummer and session musician
- Spider Webb (tattoo artist) (1944–2022), American tattoo artist
- Ellsworth Webb (1931–2017), American professional boxer, nicknamed "Spider"
- Rhys Webb (organist / bassist), bassist for English band The Horrors
- The drummer of the fictional band Bad News
- "Spider" (Aloysius) Webb, main character of a series of science fiction books by K. A. Bedford

== See also ==
- Spider Web (disambiguation)
