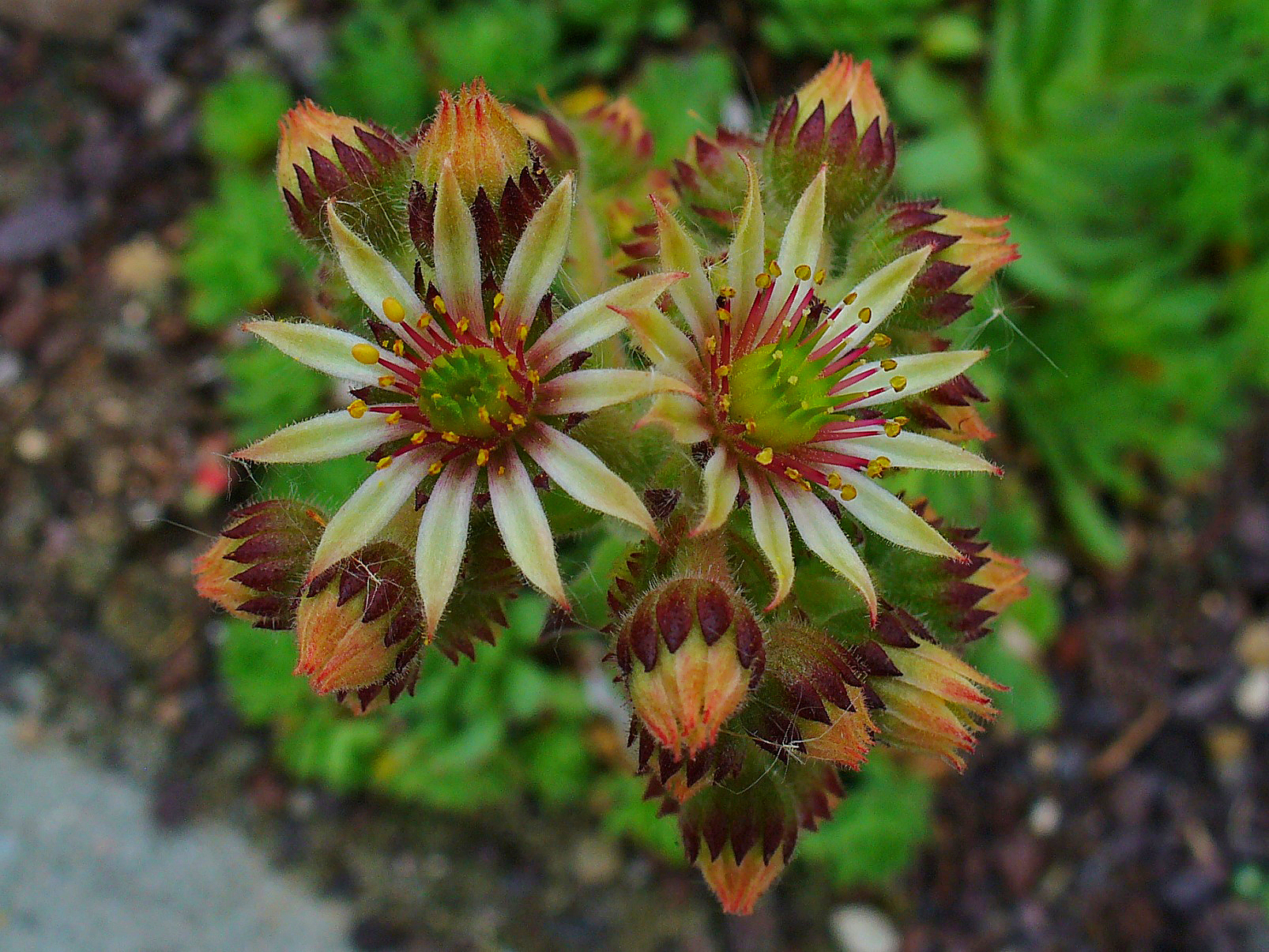
- Close-up of flowers

Scientific classification
- Kingdom: Plantae
- Clade: Embryophytes
- Clade: Tracheophytes
- Clade: Angiosperms
- Clade: Eudicots
- Order: Saxifragales
- Family: Crassulaceae
- Genus: Sempervivum
- Species: S. pittonii

Binomial name
- Sempervivum pittonii Schott, Nyman & Kotschy

= Sempervivum pittonii =

Species of flowering plant

Sempervivum pittonii, called the Pittoni houseleek, is a species of flowering plant in the genus Sempervivum, native to the eastern Alps of Austria. It is a local endemic of two mountains in Styria, where it occurs exclusively on serpentine rock. A perennial, cold hardy, rosette-forming succulent, it has gained the Royal Horticultural Society's Award of Garden Merit.

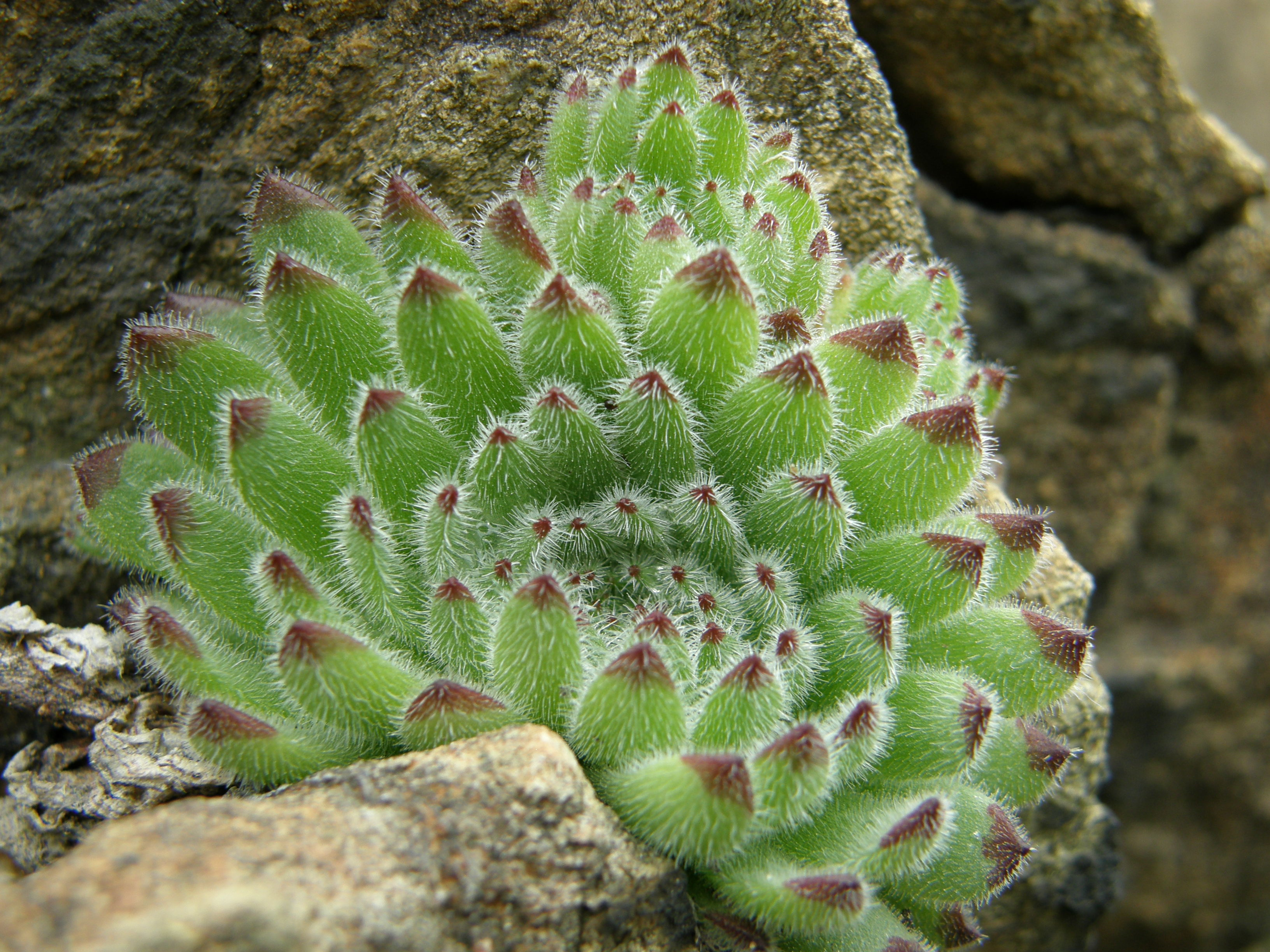
Rosette in the wild in Styria

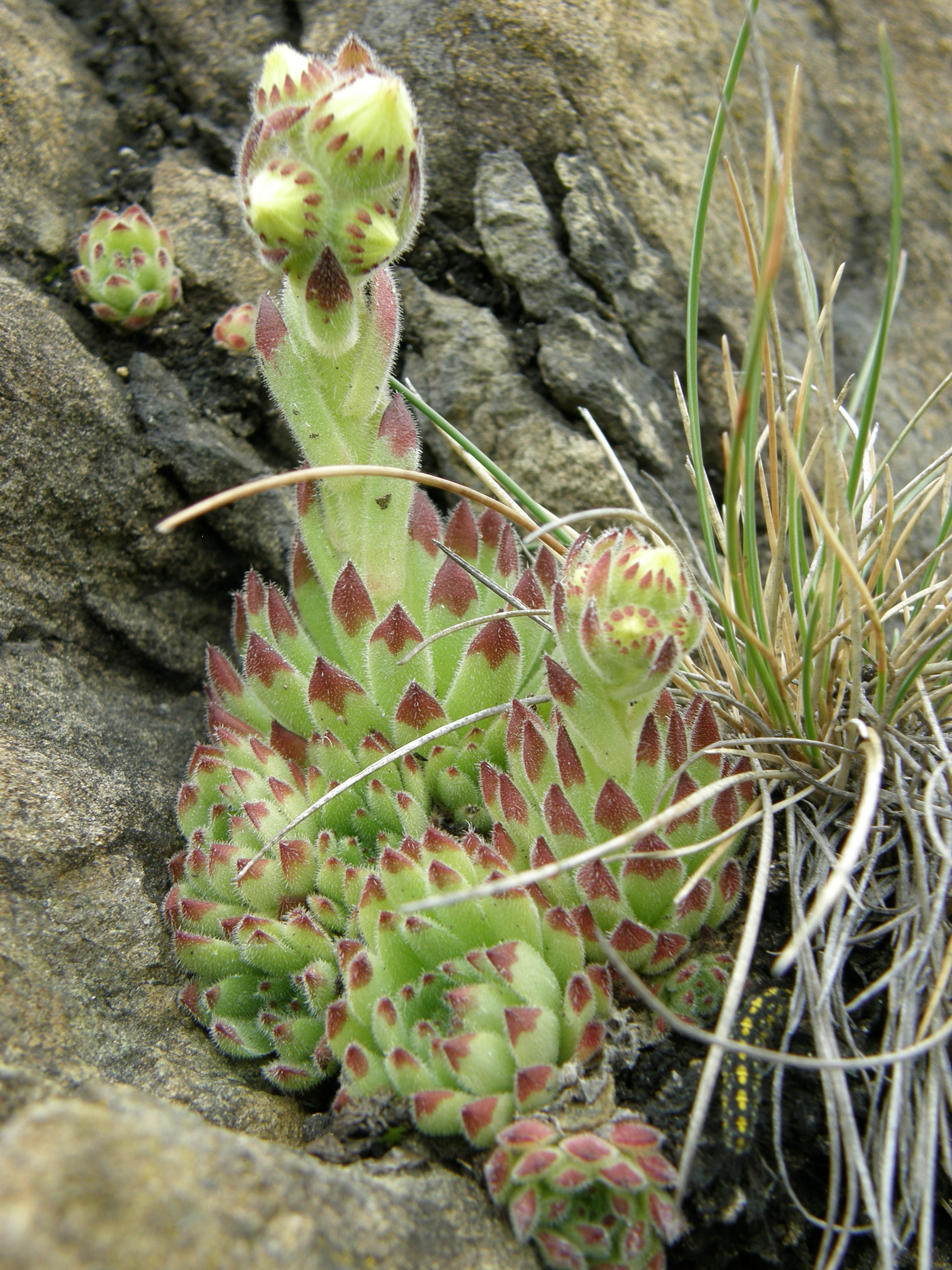
Budding inflorescences in the wild

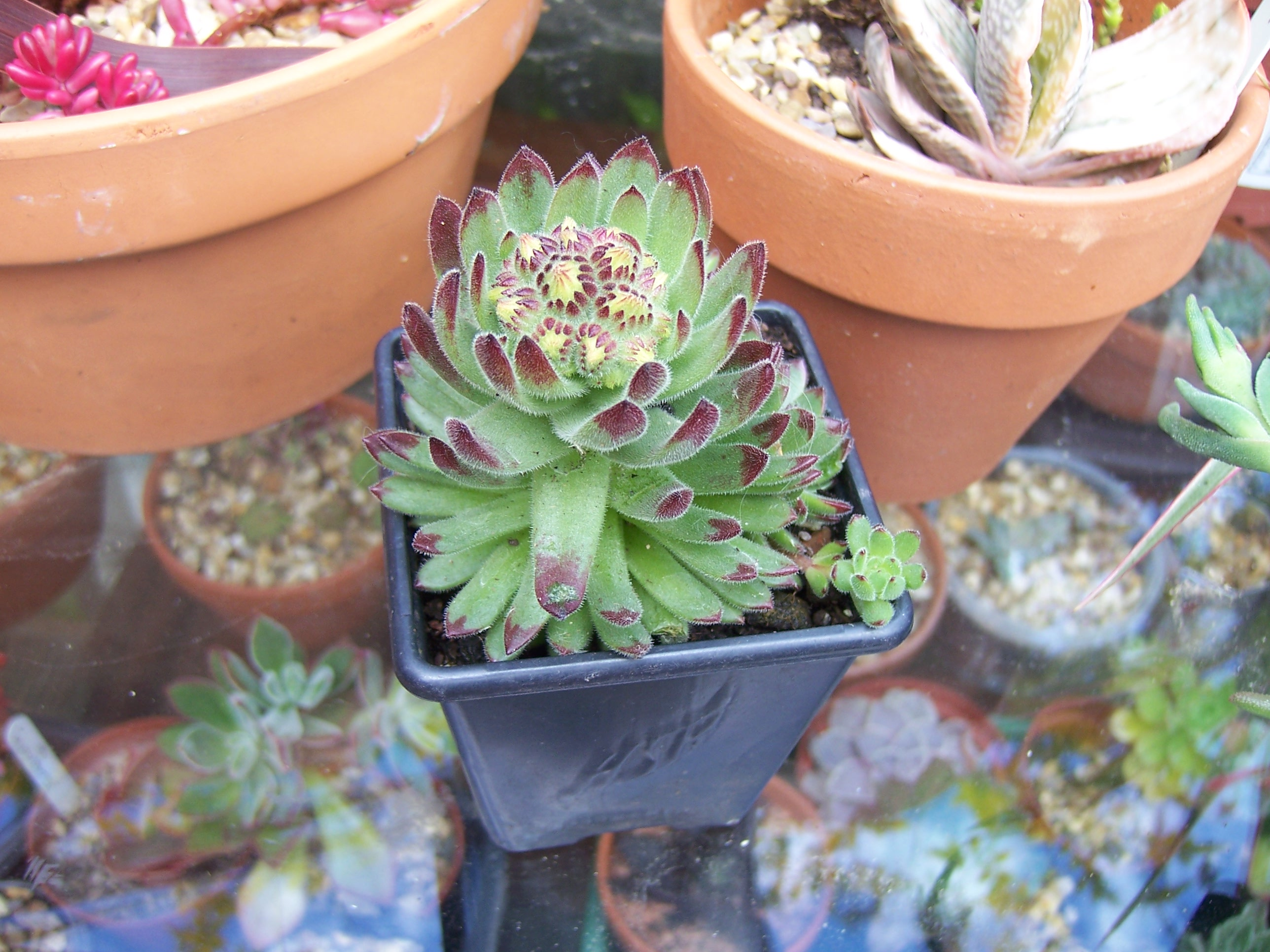
A specimen showing scale

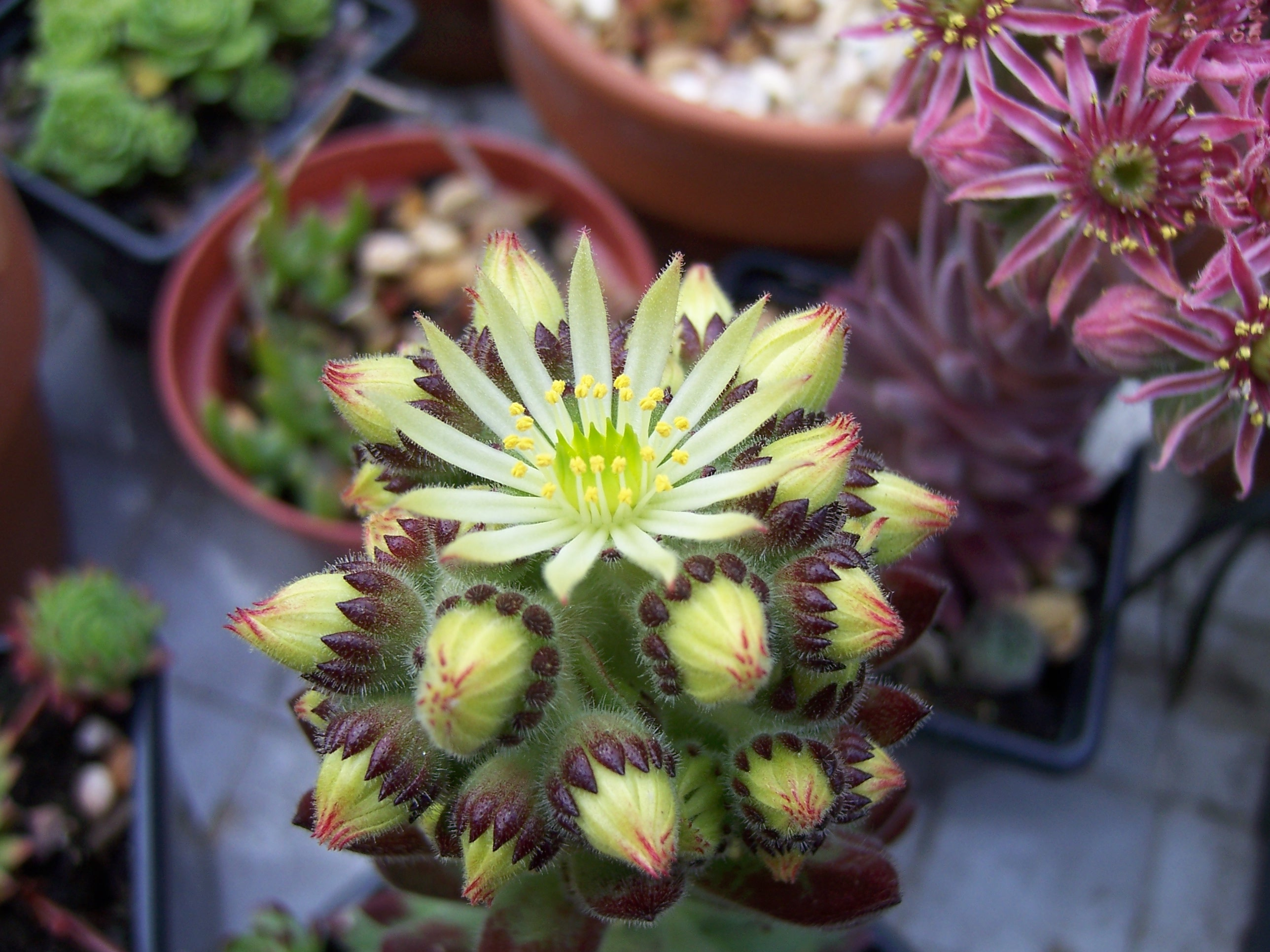
A variety with white flowers
