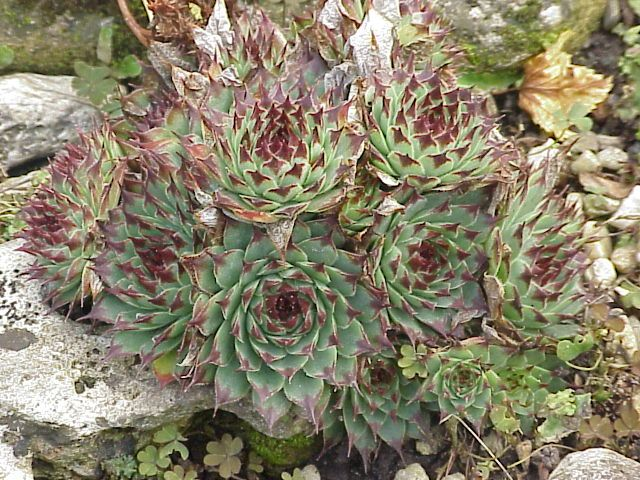

Scientific classification
- Kingdom: Plantae
- Clade: Tracheophytes
- Clade: Angiosperms
- Clade: Eudicots
- Order: Saxifragales
- Family: Crassulaceae
- Genus: Sempervivum
- Species: S. calcareum

Binomial name
- Sempervivum calcareum Jord.

Synonyms
- List: Sempervivum californicum K.Koch; Sempervivum columnare Jord. & Fourr.; Sempervivum greenii Baker; Sempervivum racemosum Jord. & Fourr.; Sempervivum tectorum var. calcareum (Jord.) St.-Lag.; Sempervivum tectorum subsp. calcareum (Jord.) Rouy & E.G.Camus; Sempervivum tectorum var. columnare (Jord. & Fourr.) Rouy & E.G.Camus; Sempervivum tectorum var. racemosum (Jord. & Fourr.) Rouy & E.G.Camus

= Sempervivum calcareum =

Species of succulent

Sempervivium calcareum, the houseleek, is a species of flowering plant in the stonecrop family Crassulaceae, native to the southern Alps in Europe. An evergreen succulent perennial, it has a rosette with thick leaves that store water. The leaves are usually green with reddish-purple tips. This plant reproduces with asexual budding and monocarpic sexual reproduction.

Sempervivum calcareum is cultivated as an ornamental garden plant. It is suitable for a well-drained spot in full sun, such as a rockery. The cultivars 'Extra', 'Guillaumes' and 'Sir William Lawrence' have gained the Royal Horticultural Society's Award of Garden Merit.
