= The Cobweb =

The Cobweb may refer to:

- The Cobweb, a novel by William Gibson
- The Cobweb (1955 film), a film starring Richard Widmark, based on the Gibson novel
- The Cobweb (1917 film), a film by Cecil Hepworth
- The Cobweb (novel), a 1996 novel by Neal Stephenson

== See also ==
- Cobweb (disambiguation)
