= Sempervivum altum =

Scientific classification
- Kingdom: Plantae
- Clade: Tracheophytes
- Clade: Angiosperms
- Clade: Eudicots
- Order: Saxifragales
- Family: Crassulaceae
- Genus: Sempervivum
- Species: S. altum

Binomial name
- Sempervivum altum Turrill

Species of succulent

Sempervivum altum is a species of flowering plant in the family Crassulaceae, native to the Caucasus Mountains. Like other members of the houseleek genus, it grows succulent leaves in rosettes. The rosettes of S. altum are 1–5 cm across, and the leaves are pubescent or pilose. The flowers are pink edged with white, with yellow anthers, growing on a stem 30–40 cm tall. The species was described in 1936 by William Bertram Turrill based on specimens collected by P.L. Giuseppi in a 1935 expedition to the Caucasus Mountains. It is closely related to S. ingwersenii and S. ossetiense from the same region. As of June 2013, the name is not accepted by the World Checklist of Selected Plant Families.
