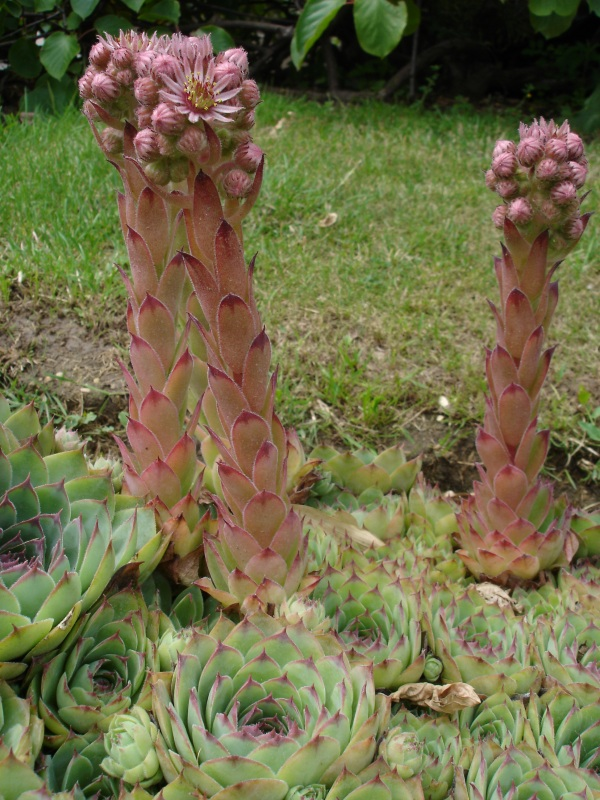
- Flowering Sempervivum tectorum

Scientific classification
- Kingdom: Plantae
- Clade: Embryophytes
- Clade: Tracheophytes
- Clade: Angiosperms
- Clade: Eudicots
- Order: Saxifragales
- Family: Crassulaceae
- Subfamily: Sempervivoideae
- Tribe: Semperviveae
- Genus: Sempervivum; L.

Species
- List: Sempervivum × alatum Scheele; Sempervivum altum Turrill; Sempervivum annae Gurgen.; Sempervivum arachnoideum L.; Sempervivum armenum Boiss. & A.Huet; Sempervivum artvinense Muirhead; Sempervivum atlanticum (Ball ex Hook.f.) Baker; Sempervivum atropatanum J.Parn.; Sempervivum balcanicum Stoj.; Sempervivum × barbulatum Schott; Sempervivum borissovae Wale; Sempervivum brevipilum Muirhead; Sempervivum calcareum Jord.; Sempervivum carpathicum Wettst. ex Prodan; Sempervivum caucasicum Rupr. ex Boiss.; Sempervivum cernochii Niederle; Sempervivum charadzeae Gurgen.; Sempervivum × christii W.Wolf; Sempervivum ciliosum Craib; Sempervivum × comollii Rota; Sempervivum davisii Muirhead; Sempervivum dolomiticum Facchini; Sempervivum dzhavachischvilii Gurgen.; Sempervivum ekimii Karaer; Sempervivum ermanicum Gurgen.; Sempervivum erythraeum Velen.; Sempervivum × feigeanum Neeff; Sempervivum × fimbriatum Schnittsp. & C.B.Lehm.; Sempervivum × funckii F.Braun ex W.D.J.Koch; Sempervivum gillianiae Muirhead; Sempervivum × giuseppii Wale; Sempervivum glabrifolium Boriss.; Sempervivum globiferum L.; Sempervivum grandiflorum Haw.; Sempervivum guillemotii Lamotte; Sempervivum herfriedianum Neeff; Sempervivum heuffelii Schott; Sempervivum ingwersenii Wale; Sempervivum iranicum Bornm. & Gauba; Sempervivum ispartae Muirhead; Sempervivum kosaninii Praeger; Sempervivum leucanthum Pančić; Sempervivum × luisae L.Gallo; Sempervivum macedonicum Praeger; Sempervivum marmoreum Griseb.; Sempervivum minus Turrill ex Wale; Sempervivum minutum (Kunze ex Willk.) Nyman ex Pau; Sempervivum montanum L.; Sempervivum × morelianum Viv.-Morel; Sempervivum ossetiense Wale; Sempervivum pisidicum Peşmen & Güner; Sempervivum pittonii Schott, Nyman & Kotschy; Sempervivum × praegeri G.D.Rowley; Sempervivum pumilum M.Bieb.; Sempervivum × rupicola A.Kern.; Sempervivum ruthenicum Schnittsp. & C.B.Lehm.; Sempervivum soculense D.Donati & G.Dumont; Sempervivum sosnowskyi Ter-Chatsch.; Sempervivum staintonii Muirhead; Sempervivum × stenopetalum Schnittsp. & C.B.Lehm.; Sempervivum tectorum L.; Sempervivum × thompsonianum Wale; Sempervivum transcaucasicum Muirhead; Sempervivum × vaccarii Wilczek ex Vacc.; Sempervivum vicentei Pau; Sempervivum wulfenii Hoppe ex Mert. & W.D.J.Koch

Synonyms
- Diopogon Jord. & Fourr.; Jovibarba (DC.) Opiz); × Jovivum G.D.Rowley

= Sempervivum =

Genus of flowering plants

Sempervivum (/sɛmpəˈvaɪvəm/) is a genus of about 40 species of flowering plants in the family Crassulaceae, commonly known as houseleeks. Other common names include liveforever (the source of the taxonomical designation Sempervivum, literally "always/forever alive") and hen and chicks, a name shared with plants of other genera as well. They are succulent perennials forming mats composed of tufted leaves in rosettes. In favourable conditions they spread rapidly via offsets, and several species are valued in cultivation as groundcover for dry, sunny locations.

== Habitat ==
Houseleeks exist from Morocco to Iran, through the mountains of Iberia, the Alps, Carpathians, Balkan mountains, Turkey, the Armenian mountains, in the northeastern part of the Sahara Desert, and the Caucasus. Their ability to store water in their thick leaves allows them to live on sunny rocks and stony places in the mountain, subalpine and alpine belts. Most are hardy to US zone 4, and will handle warm climates to about zone 9.

== Subtropical origin ==
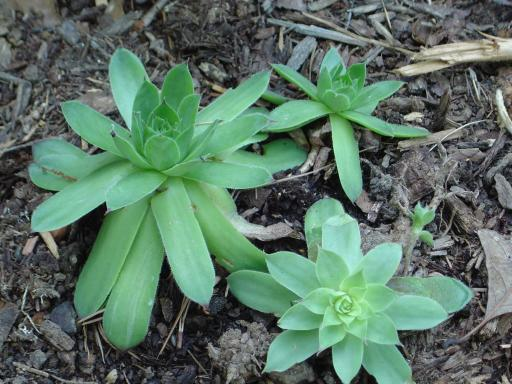
Sempervivum tectorum (common houseleek)

Morphologically, they are similar to the genera Jovibarba, Aeonium, Greenovia, Aichryson, and Monanthes, occurring mainly in Macaronesia (Azores, Canary Islands, Cape Verde, Madeira). Some botanists include some or all of these genera within a wider interpretation of Sempervivum, particularly Jovibarba.

== Origin of name ==
The name Sempervivum has its origin in the Latin semper ("always") and vivus ("living"), a calque of Ancient Greek ἀείζωον ("houseleek", literally "(the) forever-living (one)"), because this perennial plant keeps its leaves in winter and is very resistant to difficult conditions of growth. The common name "houseleek" comes from the Anglo-Saxon word leac, meaning "plant", since these are literally plants that grow on houses. Some Europeans believed it would ward off fire and lightning strikes. A Welsh tradition holds that having it grow on the roof of the house brings health and prosperity to those who live there. The plant is not closely related to the true leek, which belongs to the Allium genus.

Other common names reflect the plant's ancient association with Thor, the Norse god of thunder, and the Roman Jupiter, hence names such as "Jupiter's beard" and the German Donnerbart ("thunder beard").

== Growth and reproduction ==
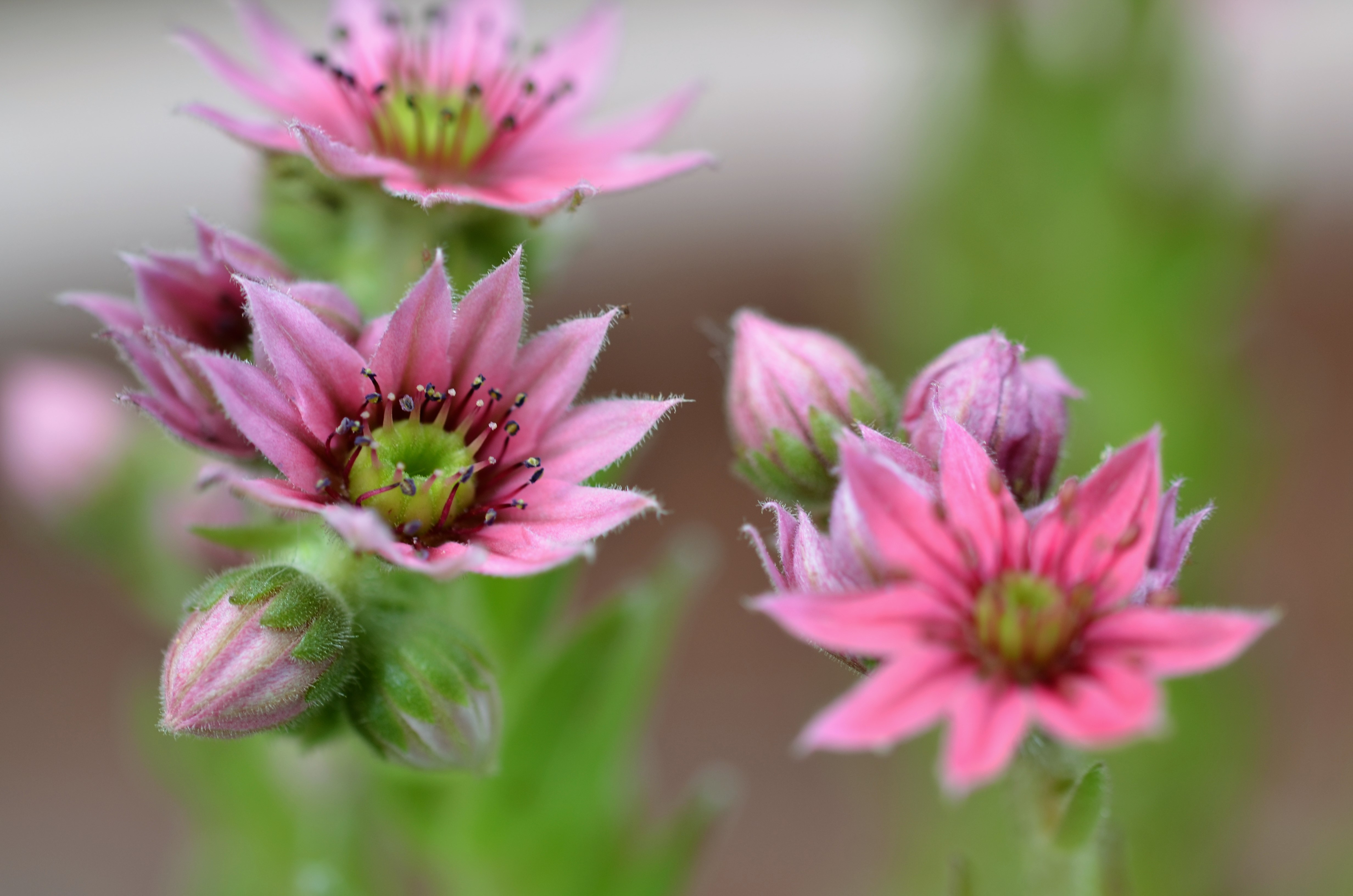
Flowering Sempervivum

Houseleeks grow as tufts of perennial but monocarpic rosettes. Each rosette propagates asexually by lateral rosettes (offsets, "hen and chicks"), by splitting of the rosette (only Jovibarba heuffelii) or sexually by tiny seeds.

Typically, each plant grows for several years before flowering. Their hermaphrodite flowers have first a male stage. Then the stamens curve themselves and spread away from the carpels at the center of the flower, so self-pollination is rather difficult. The colour of the flowers is reddish, yellowish, pinkish, or—seldom—whitish. In Sempervivum, the flowers are actinomorphic (like a star) and have more than six petals, while in Jovibarba, the flowers are campanulate (bell-shaped) and are pale green-yellow with six petals. After flowering, the plant dies, usually leaving many offsets it has produced during its life.

== Identification ==
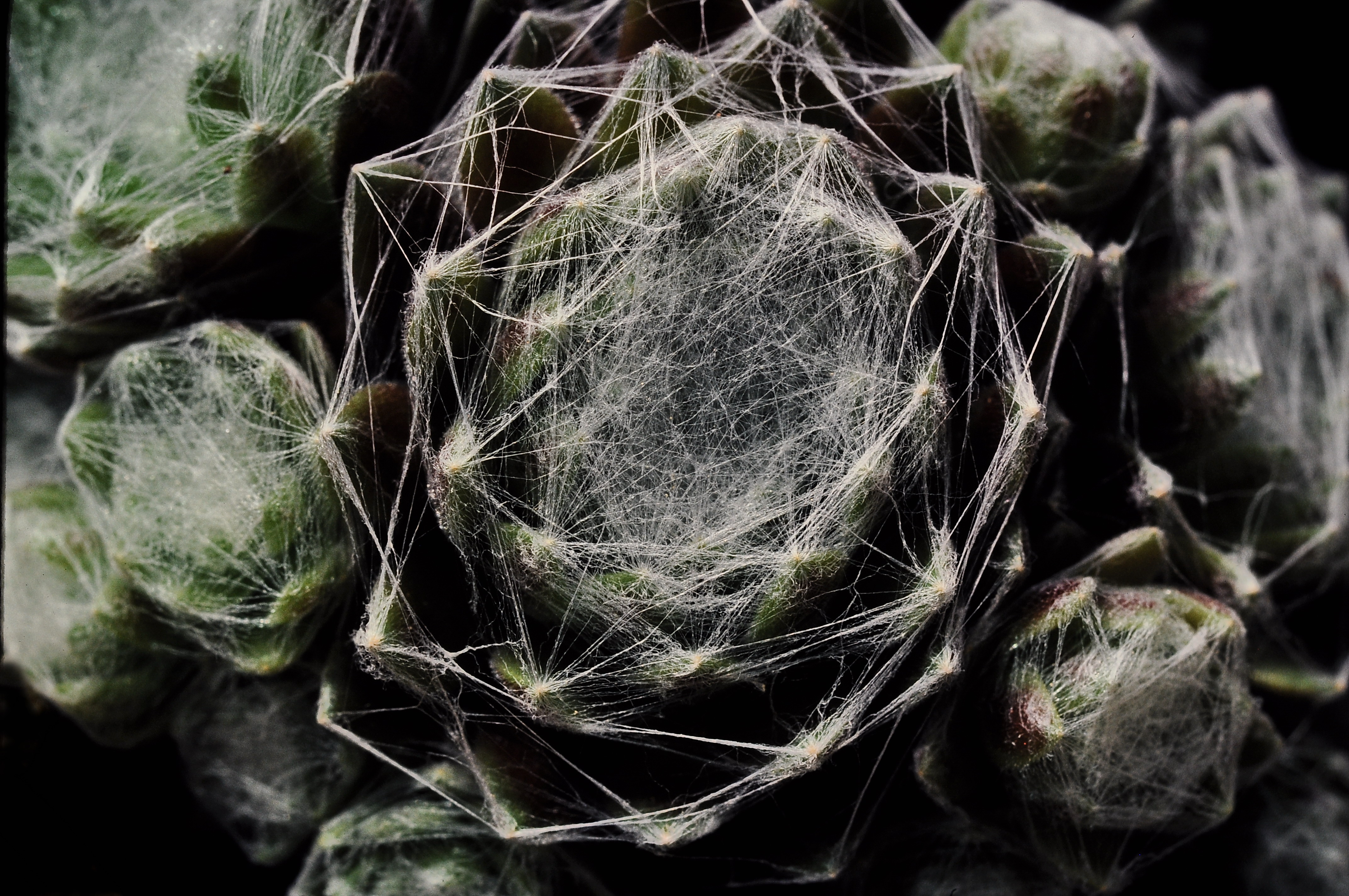
Sempervivum arachnoideum

The genus Sempervivum is usually easy to recognize, although it may sometimes be confused with the genus Echeveria. However, its species are often not easy to identify. Even one single clone can look very different under various growth conditions (modifications) or different times of the year. The members of this genus are very similar and closely linked to each other. As a consequence, many subspecies, varieties, and forms were described, without well-defined limits between them. As a second consequence, there is a high frequency of natural hybrids in this genus and the possibility of back-crossings of these. However, more or less 40 species can be individualized in the whole area of the genus, but there are many more local populations, without nomenclatural valour but sometimes with their own characters.

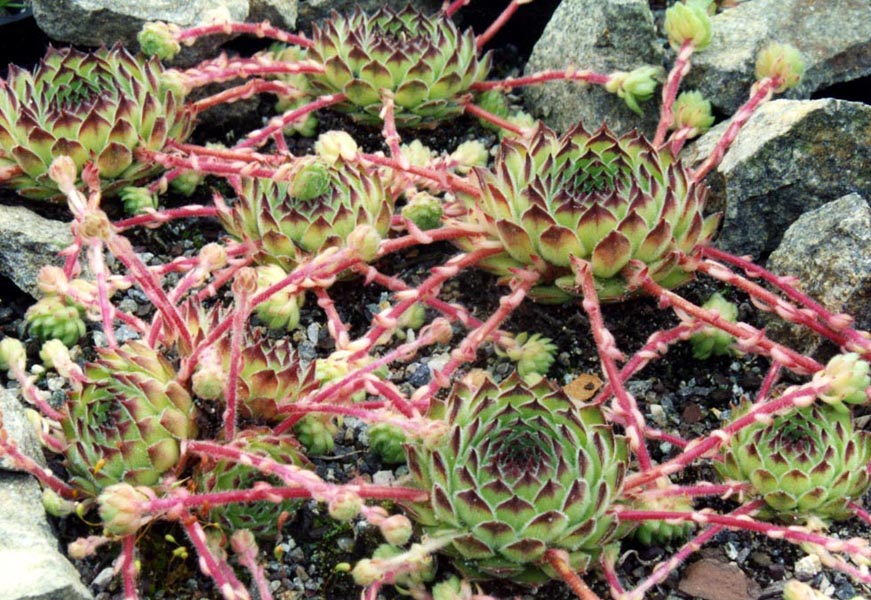
Sempervivum kosanini

In the Alps, the most distributed species are S. tectorum (common houseleek, sometimes called S. alpinum), S. montanum (mountain houseleek) and S. arachnoideum (cobwebbed houseleek), each one with several subspecies. More local are the yellow-flowered S. wulfenii and S. grandiflorum, and the limestone houseleek (S. calcareum). More rare are S. dolomiticum and S. pittonii, the latter which is endemic to Eastern Austria.

Outside of its native geographic range, Sempervivum tectorum frequently grows in a naturalized or spontaneous state on anthropogenic structures such as residential roofs and old stone walls. The species has a long-documented history in traditional herbal medicine and European folklore, where it was historically categorized alongside plants associated with folk magic and protective rituals. Within these regional cultural traditions, certain superstitious beliefs held that cultivating the plant directly on top of a home would safeguard the household and the building from being struck by lightning.

== Herbalism ==
It has been used historically and is used presently for purported health benefits. It has no known side effects (aside from being an emetic in large doses) or drug interactions. Common herbal uses are stopping bad cases of diarrhea by drinking the juice of the leaf or eating the leaves directly, and the juice is commonly applied directly to the skin for many of the same uses as aloe vera such as burns, warts and insect bites. It is furthermore said to bring relief in cases of swellings and water retention.

The famous English herbalist Culpepper says 'Our ordinary Houseleek is good for all inward heats, as well as outward, and in the eyes or other parts of the body: a posset made of the juice is singularly good in all hot agues, for it cooleth and tempereth the blood and spirits and quencheth the thirst; and is also good to stay all deflection or sharp and salt rheums in the eyes, the juice being dropped into them. If the juice be dropped into the ears, it easeth pain.... It cooleth and restraineth all hot inflammations St. Anthony's fire (Erysipelas), scaldings and burnings, the shingles, fretting ulcers, ringworms and the like; and much easeth the pain and the gout.'

== In Food ==
Ibn Sayyar al-Warraq mentions the juice of houseleek (by the medieval Arabic name bustan abrawiz) as a source of pink coloring for food; furthermore, it can be mixed with saffron to create a deeper yellow color than saffron alone.

== Garden and container plants ==
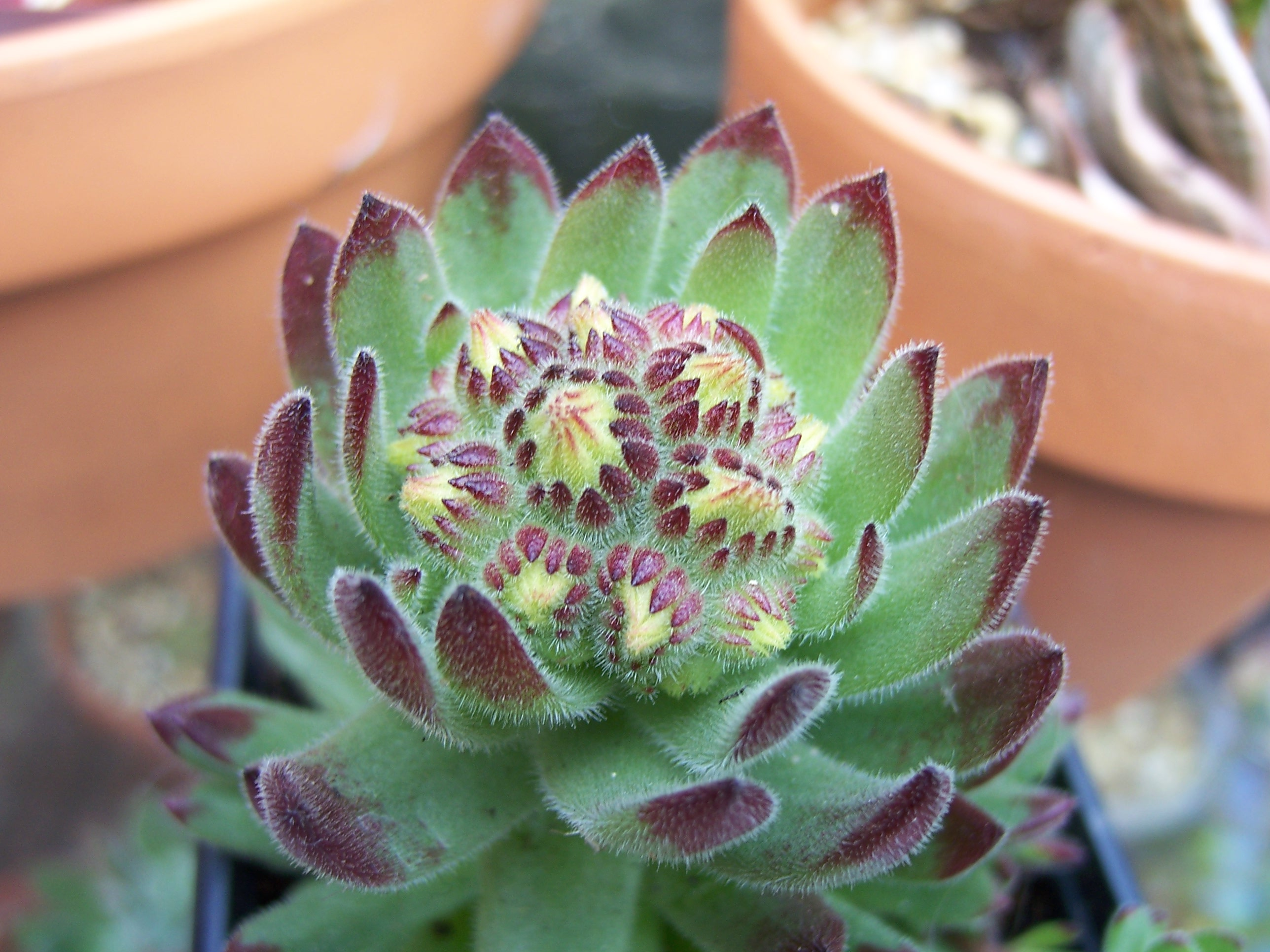
Sempervivum pittonii

Although their subtropical cousins are very frost-sensitive, sempervivums are among the most frost-resistant succulents, making them popular garden plants. They tend to grow best in dry conditions with well-draining, sandy soil to prevent soggy roots. They require only moderate watering, especially during warmer months, with occasional protection from extreme sun exposure.

Sempervivums also make suitable plants for containers, and do well in breathable terracotta, concrete, and cement pots. They have also been known to grow in rock crevices, metal containers, succulent wreaths, roof shingles, and anywhere else that allows adequate root drainage.

=== Cultivars ===
Collectors are numerous and often have many different cultivars in their collections. Sempervivums are very variable plants and hence hundreds, maybe thousands of cultivars have been created, but a lot of them are not much different from each other. The main interest of these cultivars is not their flowers, but form and color of the rosette-leaves.

The following species and cultivars—some of mixed or uncertain parentage—have gained the Royal Horticultural Society's Award of Garden Merit:-

- Sempervivum arachnoideum
- Sempervivum arachnoideum subsp. tomentosum
- 'Bronco'
- Sempervivum calcareum 'Extra'
- Sempervivum calcareum 'Guillaume'
- Sempervivum ciliosum
- 'Lilac Time'
- 'Othello'
- Sempervivum pittonii
- 'Reinhard'
- Sempervivum tectorum

== Gallery ==
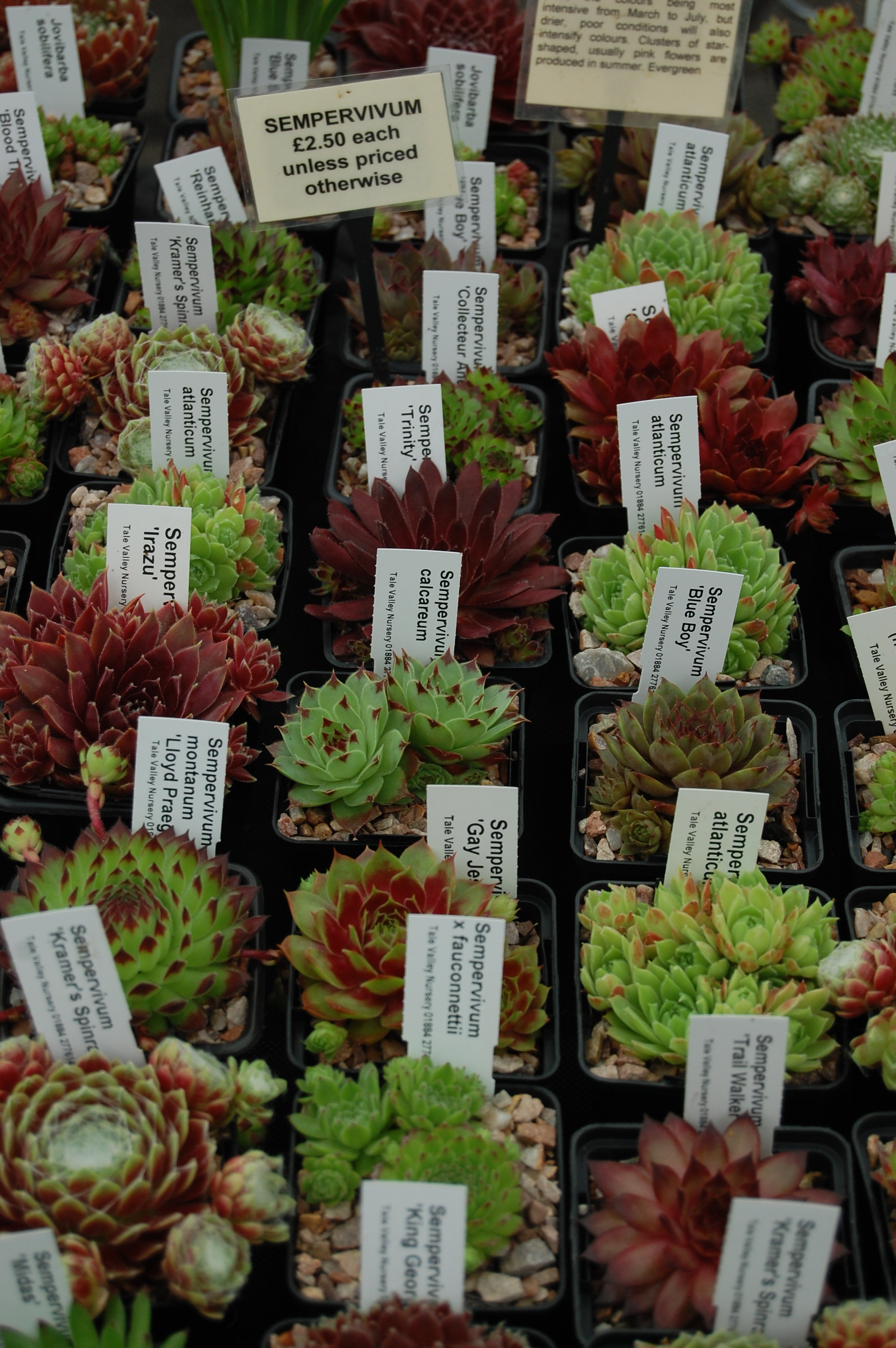
A selection of Sempervivum cultivars, for sale at Gardeners' World Live 2012

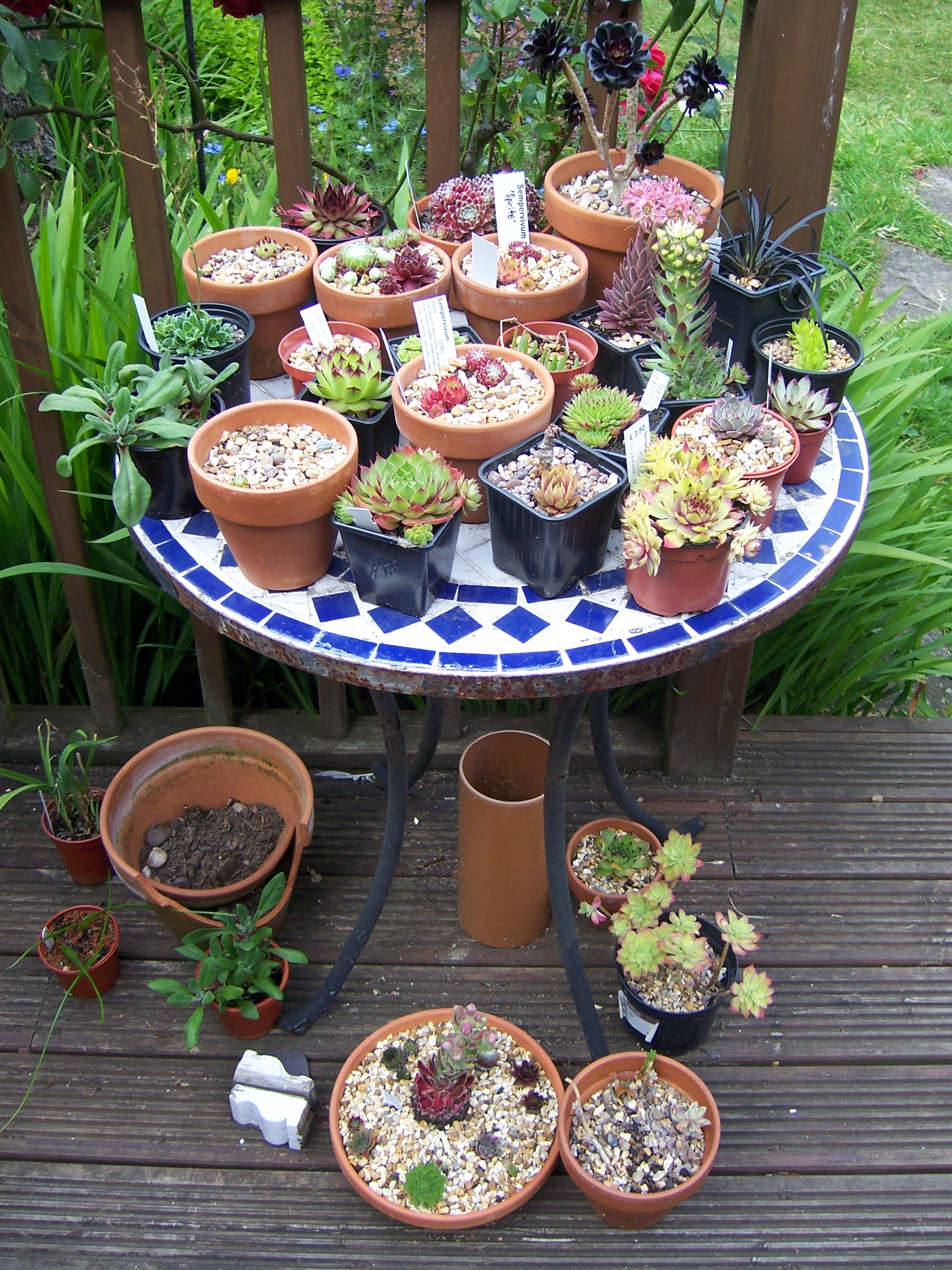
A personal collection of potted sempervivums

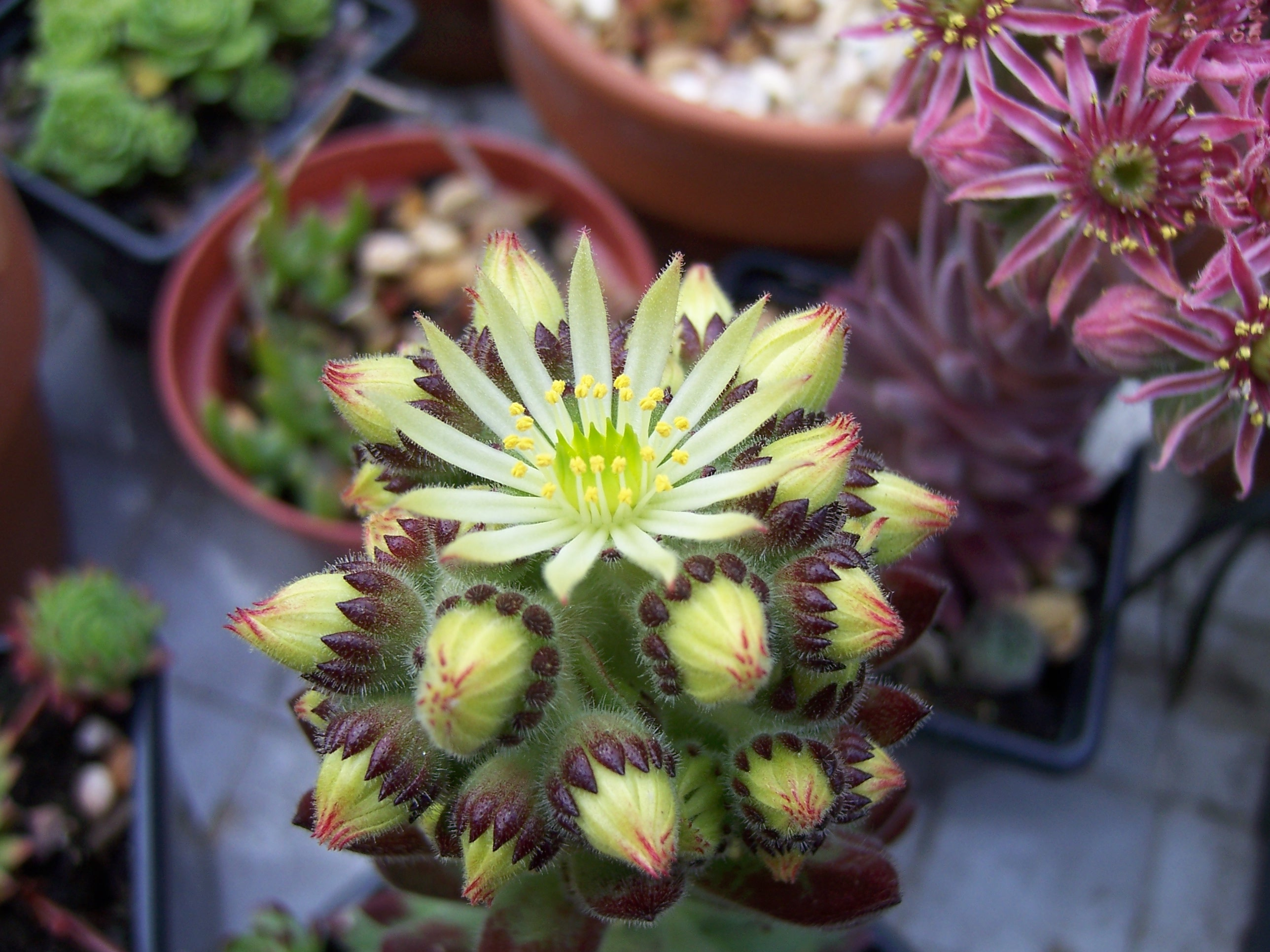
Sempervivum pittoni

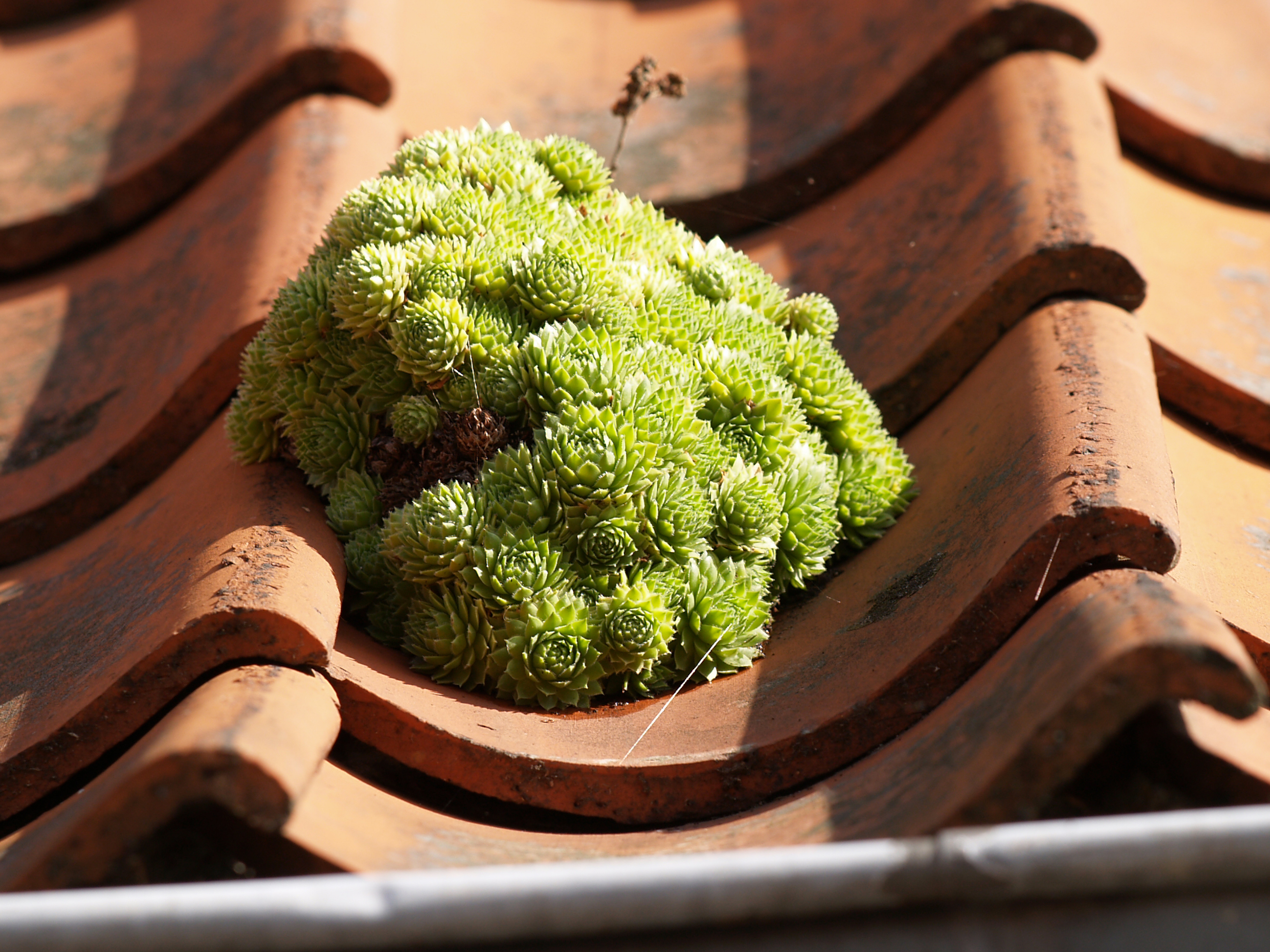
Sempervivum on a roof

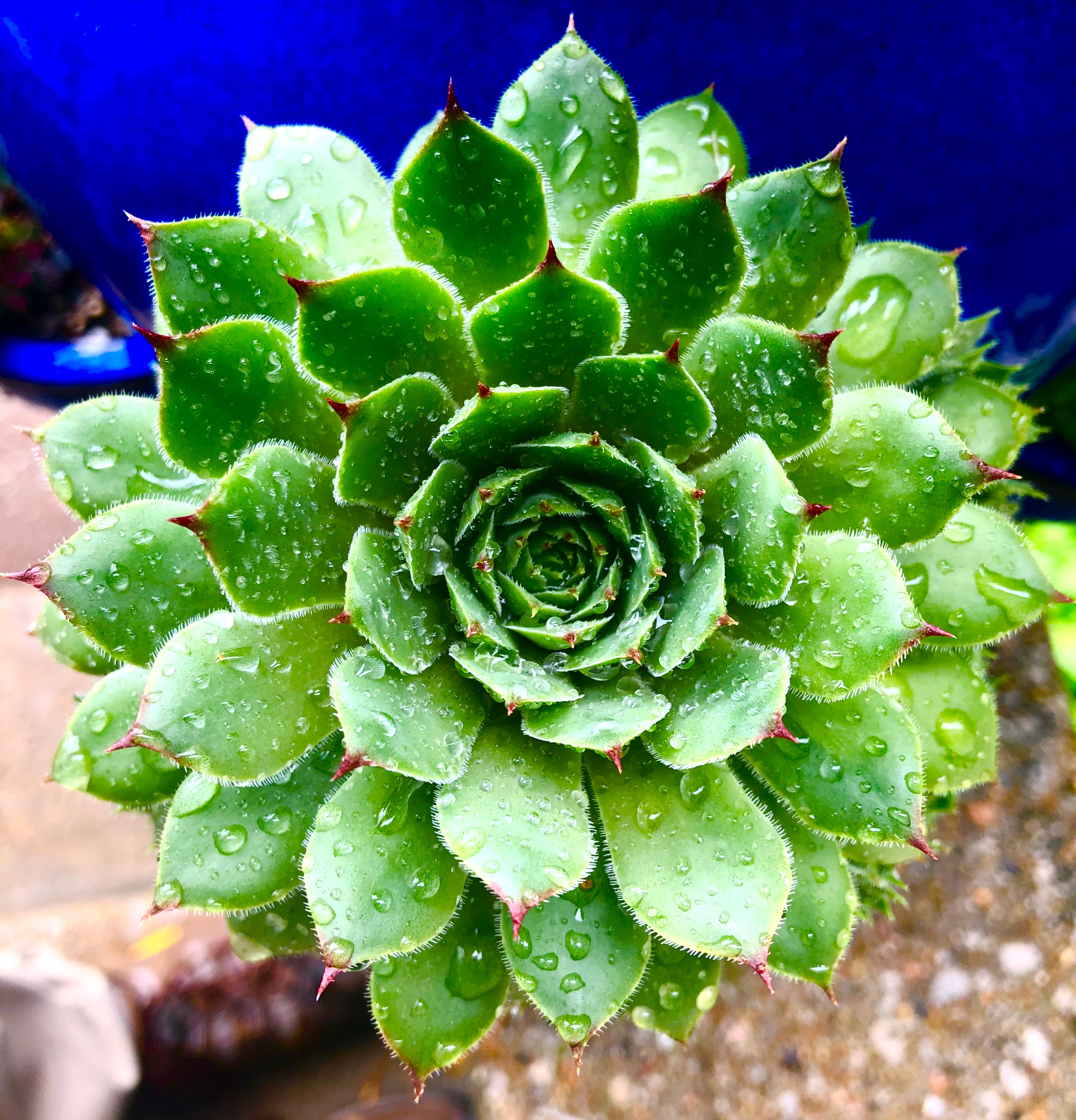
Close up of large sempervivum

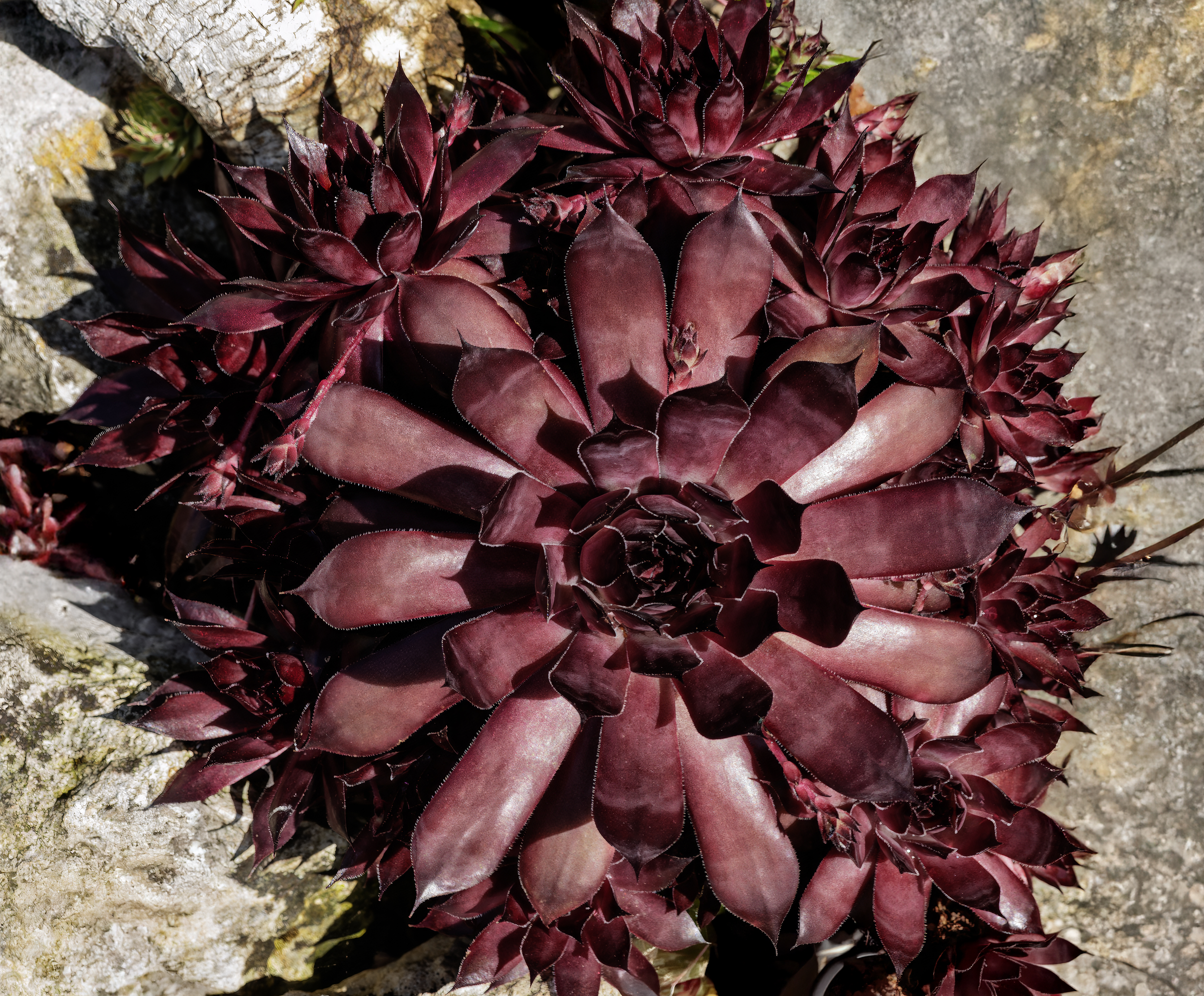
Sempervivum 'Borscht'

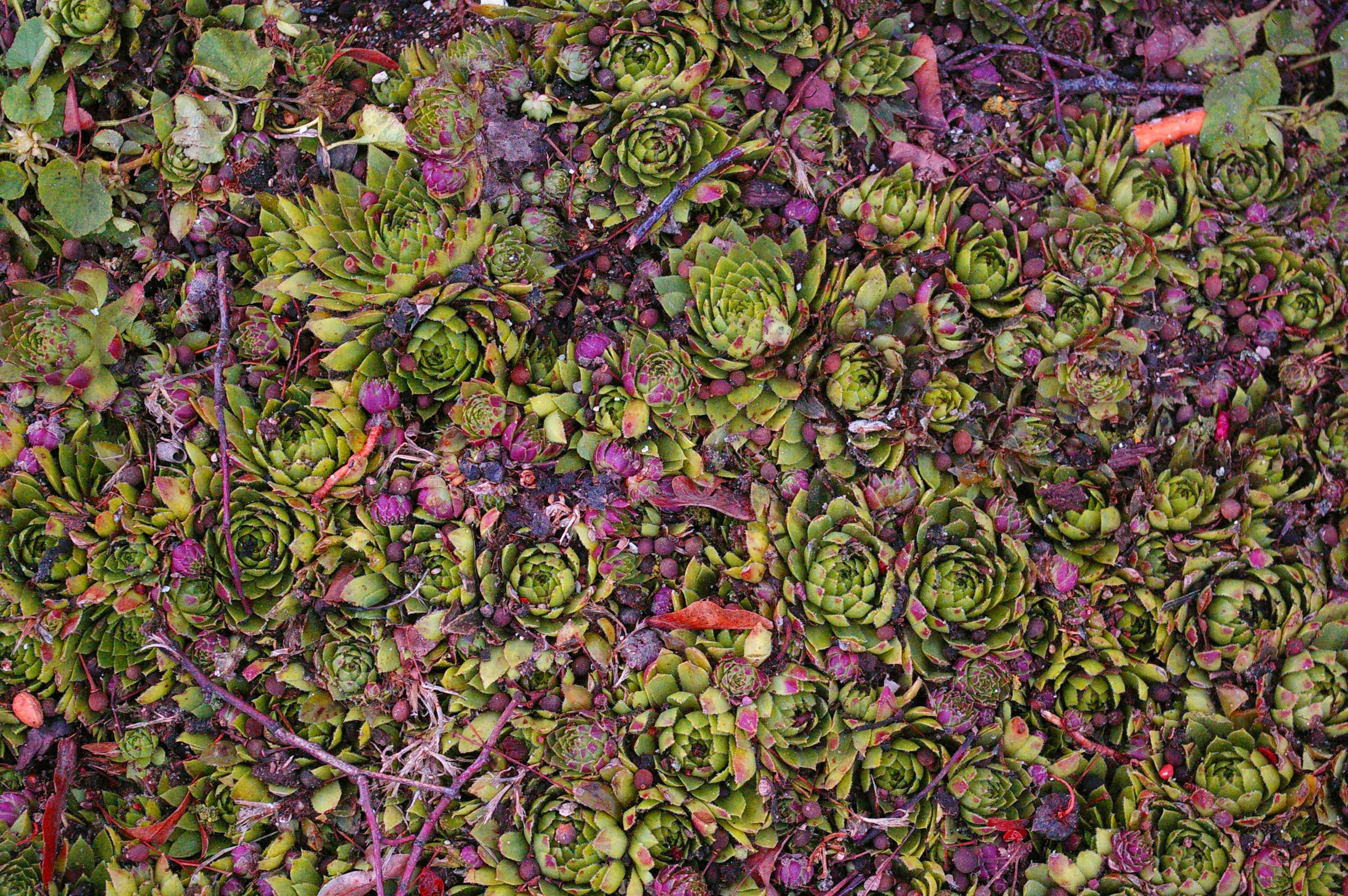
Sempervivum as a lawn
