= Interdigital webbing in mammals =

Membranes of skin between fingers and toes of animals

Interdigital webbing refers to the presence of skin membranes. Normally, in mammals, webbing is present but resorbed later in development, but in various mammal species, it occasionally persists in adulthood. In humans, it can be found in those suffering from LEOPARD syndrome and from Aarskog–Scott syndrome.

Webbing between the digits of the hindfoot is also present in several mammals that spend part of their time in the water. Webbing accommodates movement in the water.

Interdigital webbing is not to be confused with syndactyly, which is a fusing of digits and occurs rarely in humans. Syndactyly specifically affecting feet occurs in birds (such as ducks), amphibians (such as frogs), and mammals (such as the kangaroo).

== Mammals with interdigital webbing ==
=== Rodents ===
In oryzomyines, a mainly South American rodent group, the marsh rice rat, Pseudoryzomys simplex, and Sigmodontomys alfari all have small webs, which do not extend to the end of the proximal phalanges, whereas Amphinectomys savamis, Lundomys molitor and the members of the genera Holochilus and Nectomys have more expansive webbing, which extends beyond the proximal phalanges. Webbing apparently developed several times in oryzomyines and may also have been lost in some groups. Most ichthyomyines, an exclusively semiaquatic South and Central American rodent group, have small webbing, but members of the genus Rheomys have more expansive webs. Webbing is also present in the Australasian semiaquatic hydromyines (subfamily Murinae) of the genera Baiyankamys, Hydromys, and Crossomys; in the latter, it is most well-developed. The African semiaquatic rodents Colomys goslingi and Nilopegamys plumbeus, also members of the Murinae, lack interdigital webbing. Webbing is present in the hind feet of the coypu (Myocastor coypus) of South America, which is currently classified in its own family.

=== Soricomorphs ===
Among shrews, the members of the genera Chimarrogale of southeastern Asia and Neomys of western Eurasia have interdigital webbing, as does the American water shrew (Sorex palustris) of North America, but it is more well-developed in Nectogale elegans of montane Asia. Webbing is also present in the Pyrenean desman (Galemys pyrenaicus).

=== Tenrecs ===
The tenrec family, which occurs in Africa and mainly on Madagascar, includes several semiaquatic forms, and the small otter-shrews (Micropotamogale) and the aptly named web-footed tenrec (Limnogale mergulus) have developed interdigital webbing.

=== Opossums ===
The water opossum (Chironectes minimus) of South America is the only opossum with interdigital webbing.

=== Carnivorans ===
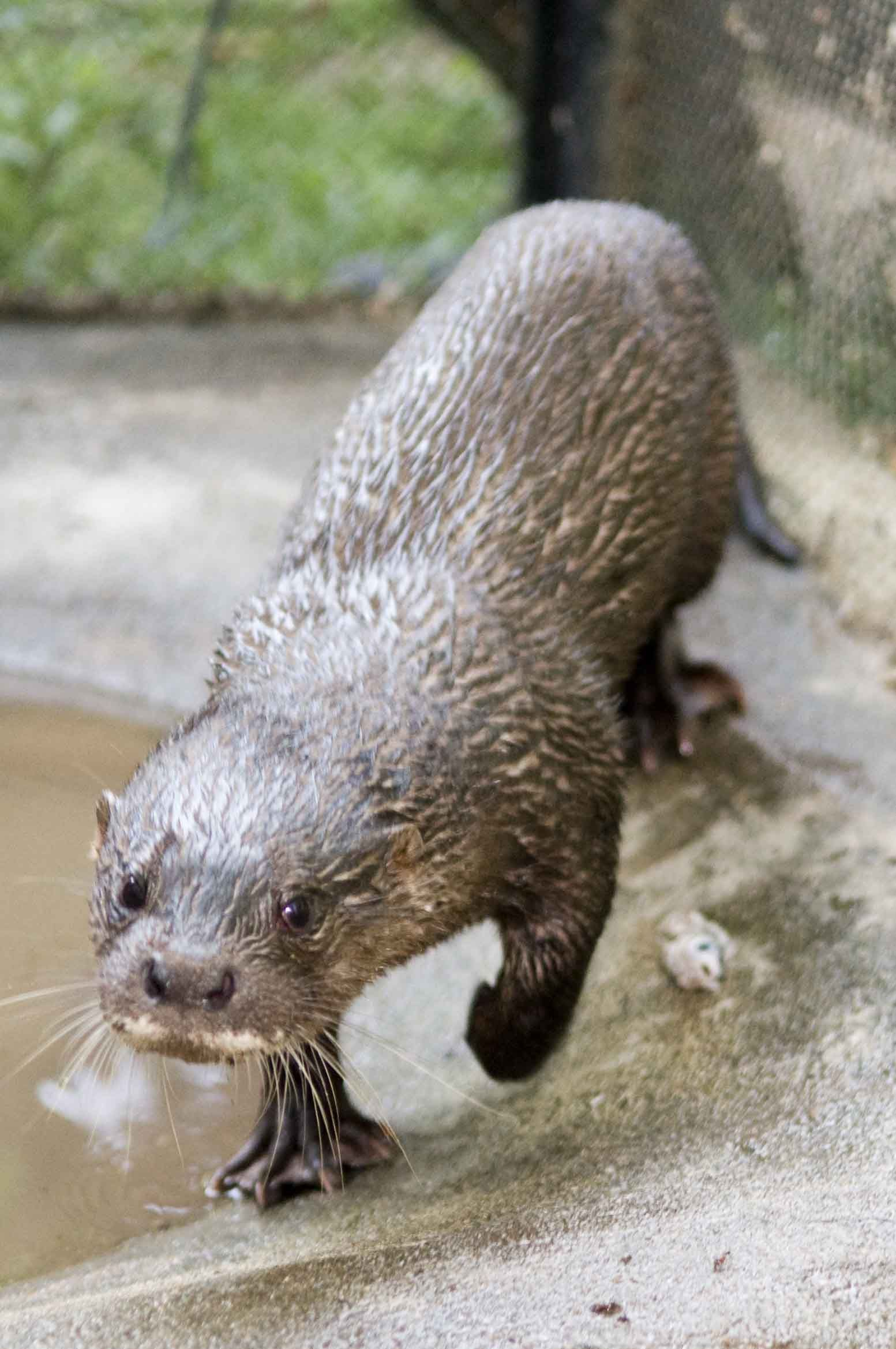
This hairy-nosed otter is leaning weight onto its webbed foot.

Several semiaquatic carnivorans have interdigital webbing, including the greater grison (Galictis vittata), the Colombian weasel (Neogale felipei), the Amazon weasel (Neogale africana), and the American mink (Neogale vison).

All otters have interdigital webbing, in the fore or hind limbs or both, to aid in aquatic propulsion. In sea otters, the webbing is covered with hair, at a density of 3300 hairs per square centimeter.

=== Whales ===
Pits present on the sides of fossil proximal phalanges of pakicetids, ancestral whales, suggest that these animals had interdigital webbing, a development hypothesized to lead to the fluke, spurred by FGF8, a fibroblast growth factor.

== Literature cited ==
- Braun, J.K. and Díaz, M.M. 1999. Key to the native mammals of Catamarca Province, Argentina. Occasional papers of the Oklahoma Museum of Natural History 4:1–16.
- Cooper, L.N., and J.G.M. Thewissen. 2009 The role of FGF-8 in the origin of interdigital webbing in cetaceans. Presentation, Society of Integrative and Comparative Biology, Boston, Massachusetts.
- Fish, Frank E. Biomechanical Perspective on the Origin of Cetacean Flukes. J. G. M. Thewissen, ed. The emergence of whales: evolutionary patterns in the origin of Cetacea. Springer, 1998. ISBN 9780306458538. 303-24.
- Harding, Larisa E.; Smith, Felisa A. (2009). "Mustela or Vison? Evidence for the taxonomic status of the American mink and a distinct biogeographic radiation of American weasels". Molecular Phylogenetics and Evolution. 52 (3): 632–42. Bibcode:2009MolPE..52..632H. doi:10.1016/j.ympev.2009.05.036. PMID 19501660.
- Kerbis Peterhans, J.C.; Patterson, B.D. (1995). "The Ethiopian water mouse Nilopegamys Osgood, with comments on the evolution of semi-aquatic adaptations in African Muridae". Zoological Journal of the Linnean Society. 113 (3): 329–349. doi:10.1111/j.1096-3642.1995.tb00937.x.
- Madar, S.I. (2007). "The postcranial skeleton of early Eocene pakicetid cetaceans". Journal of Paleontology. 81 (1): 176–200. doi:10.1666/0022-3360(2007)81[176:TPSOEE]2.0.CO;2. S2CID 86353851.
- Orrico, Alfredo; Galli, Lucia; Cavaliere, Maria Luigia; Garavelli, Livia; Fryns, Jean-Pierre; Crushell, Ellen; Rinaldi, Maria Michela; Medeira, Ana; Sorrentino, Vincenzo (2003). "Phenotypic and molecular characterisation of the Aarskog–Scott syndrome: a survey of the clinical variability in light of FGD1 mutation analysis in 46 patients". European Journal of Human Genetics. 12 (1): 16–23. doi:10.1038/sj.ejhg.5201081. PMID 14560308.
- Perrin, William F.; Würsig, Bernd; Thewissen, J. G. M. (2008). Encyclopedia of Marine Mammals. Academic Press. ISBN 978-0-12-373553-9.
- Rumbaugh, D.M. and Chiarelli, A.B. 1972. Evolution, ecology, behavior, and captive maintenance. S. Karger, 263 pp. ISBN 978-3-8055-1362-3
- Tate, G.H.H. 1951. The rodents of Australia and New Guinea. Bulletin of the American Museum of Natural History 97:187–430.
- Voss, R.S. 1988. Systematics and ecology of ichthyomyine rodents (Muroidea) : patterns of morphological evolution in a small adaptive radiation. Bulletin of the American Museum of Natural History 188:260–493.
- Voss, R.S. and Jansa, S.A. 2009. Phylogenetic relationships and classification of didelphid marsupials, an extant radiation of New World metatherian mammals. Bulletin of the American Museum of Natural History 322:1–177.
- Weksler, M. 2006. Phylogenetic relationships of oryzomyine rodents (Muroidea: Sigmodontinae): separate and combined analyses of morphological and molecular data. Bulletin of the American Museum of Natural History 296:1–149.
- Yensen, E.; Tarifa, T. (2003). "Galictis vittata" (PDF). Mammalian Species. 727: 1–8. doi:10.1644/727. S2CID 198121748. Archived from the original (PDF) on 2006-08-30.
