= Webby =

Webby may refer to:

== People ==
- Chris Webby (born 1988), American rapper
- Elizabeth Webby (1942–2023), Australian academic scholar
- Kirk Webby (born 1970), New Zealand equestrian
- William Neill (rugby league) (1884–1964), Australian rugby league footballer

== Other uses ==
- Webby Award, an Internet award
- Webbigail "Webby" Vanderquack, a character in DuckTales

== See also ==
- Webbie (born 1985), American rapper
