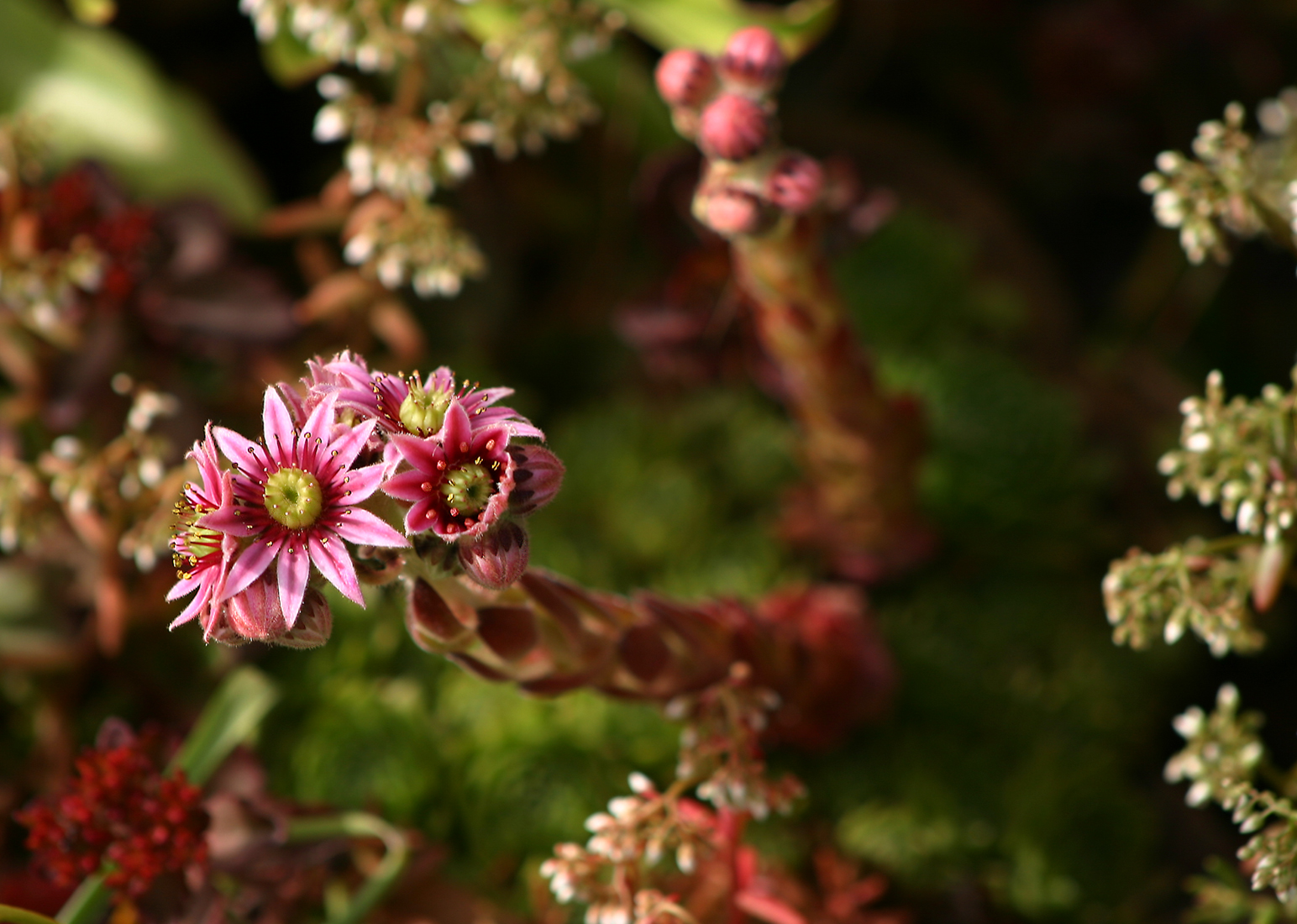

Scientific classification
- Kingdom: Plantae
- Clade: Embryophytes
- Clade: Tracheophytes
- Clade: Angiosperms
- Clade: Eudicots
- Order: Saxifragales
- Family: Crassulaceae
- Genus: Sempervivum
- Species: S. tectorum

Binomial name
- Sempervivum tectorum L.

= Sempervivum tectorum =

Common houseleek

Species of succulent

Sempervivum tectorum, the common houseleek, is a species of flowering plant in the family Crassulaceae, native to the mountains of southern Europe, cultivated in the whole of Europe for its appearance and a Roman-era tradition claiming that it protects buildings against lightning strikes.

== Description ==
Growing to 15 cm (6 in) tall by 50 cm (20 in) broad, it is a rosette-forming succulent evergreen perennial, spreading by offsets. It has grey-green, tufted, sessile leaves, 4–10 cm (2–4 in) in diameter, which are often suffused with rose-red. In summer it bears clusters of reddish-purple flowers, in multiples of 8–16, on hairy erect flat-topped stems. The species is highly variable, in part because hundreds of cultivars have been propagated, sold, and traded for nearly 200 years.

Sempervivum tectorum was described in 1753 by Linnaeus, who noted that its leaves are ciliate, that is, fringed with hairs.

== Names ==
This plant has been known to humans for thousands of years, and has attracted many common names and traditions. In addition to common houseleek, names include variations of the following:

- bullock's beard
- devil's beard
- earwort
- fuet
- healing blade
- homewort
- imbroke
- Jove's beard
- Jupiter's eye
- poor Jan's leaf
- red-leaved houseleek
- roof foil
- roof houseleek
- St. George's Beard
- St. Patrick's cabbage
- sengreen (its name in heraldry, as used in the arms of Gonville & Caius College, Cambridge)
- Thor's beard
- thunderplant
- Welcome-home-husband-though-never-so-drunk—a name it sometimes shares with Sedum acre.
- hen and chicks - a name shared with several other plants

The specific epithet tectorum means "of house roofs", referring to a traditional location for these plants.

== Cultivation and propagation ==
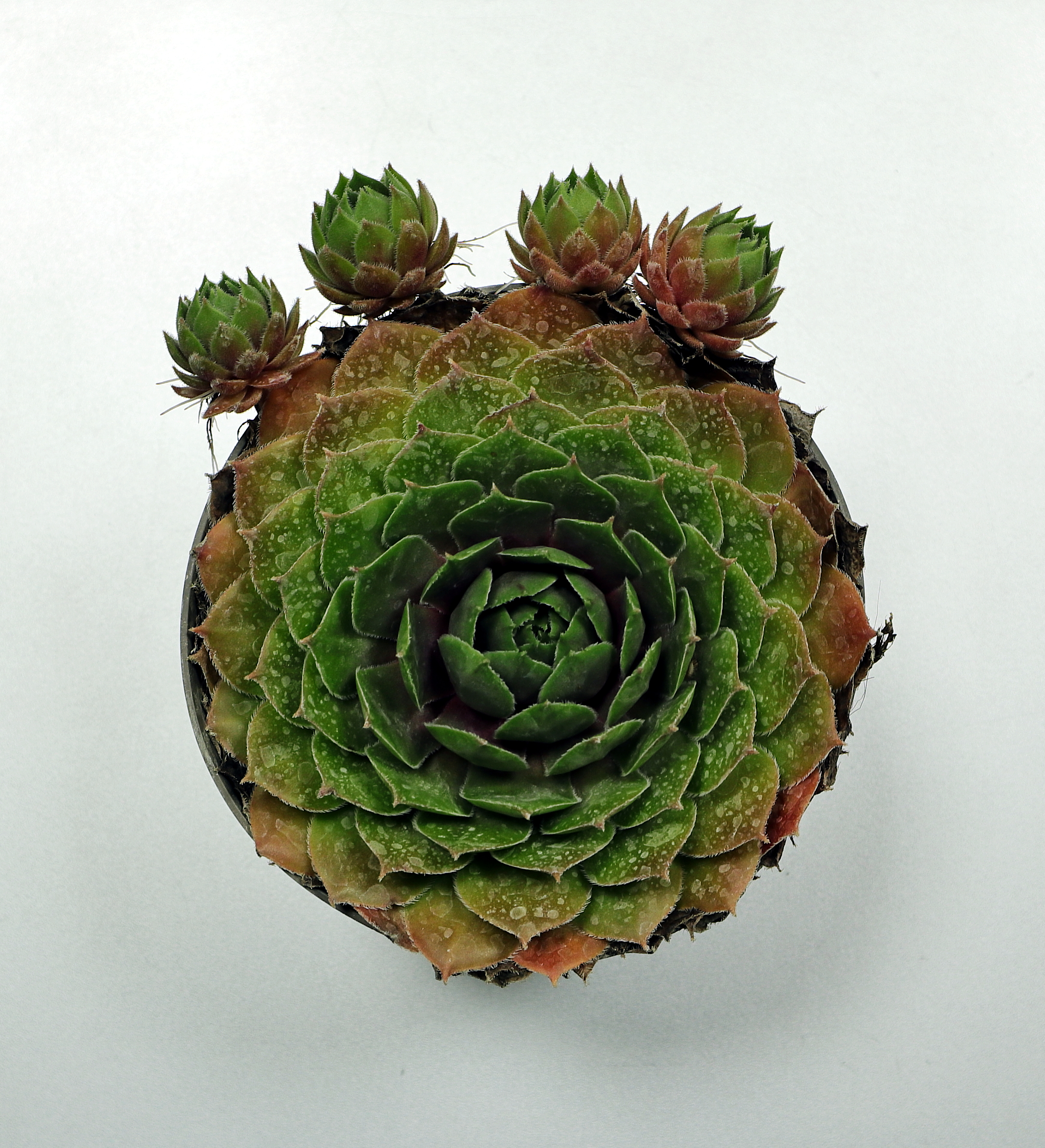
Propagation of a healthy Sempervivum tectorum's plant

Sempervivum tectorum is one of several houseleek species to be cultivated. It is valued as groundcover for hot, dry places. It has gained the Royal Horticultural Society's Award of Garden Merit.
Sempervivum tectorum multiplies horizontally by propagation of underground roots. Propagation occurs in the spring, when budding occurs. From each mother plant up to four or, on good days, ten new ones can be harvested. They come off easily when taking care not to break the roots. Seed propagation works in spring.

== Folklore and herbalism ==
The plant has been traditionally thought to protect against thunderstorms, and grown on house roofs for that reason, which is why it is called House Leek. Many of its popular names in different languages reflect an association with the Roman thunder-god Jupiter, notably the Latin barba Jovis (Jupiter's beard), referred to in the Floridus traditionally attributed to Aemilius Macer, and its French derivative joubarbe, which has in turn given rise to jubard and jo-barb in English; or with the Norse thunder-god Thor as in German Donnerbart. It is also called simply thunder-plant. Anglo-Saxon þunorwyrt may have either meaning. However, the association with Jupiter has also been derived from a resemblance between the flowers and the god's beard; in modern times, it has also been called St. George's beard.

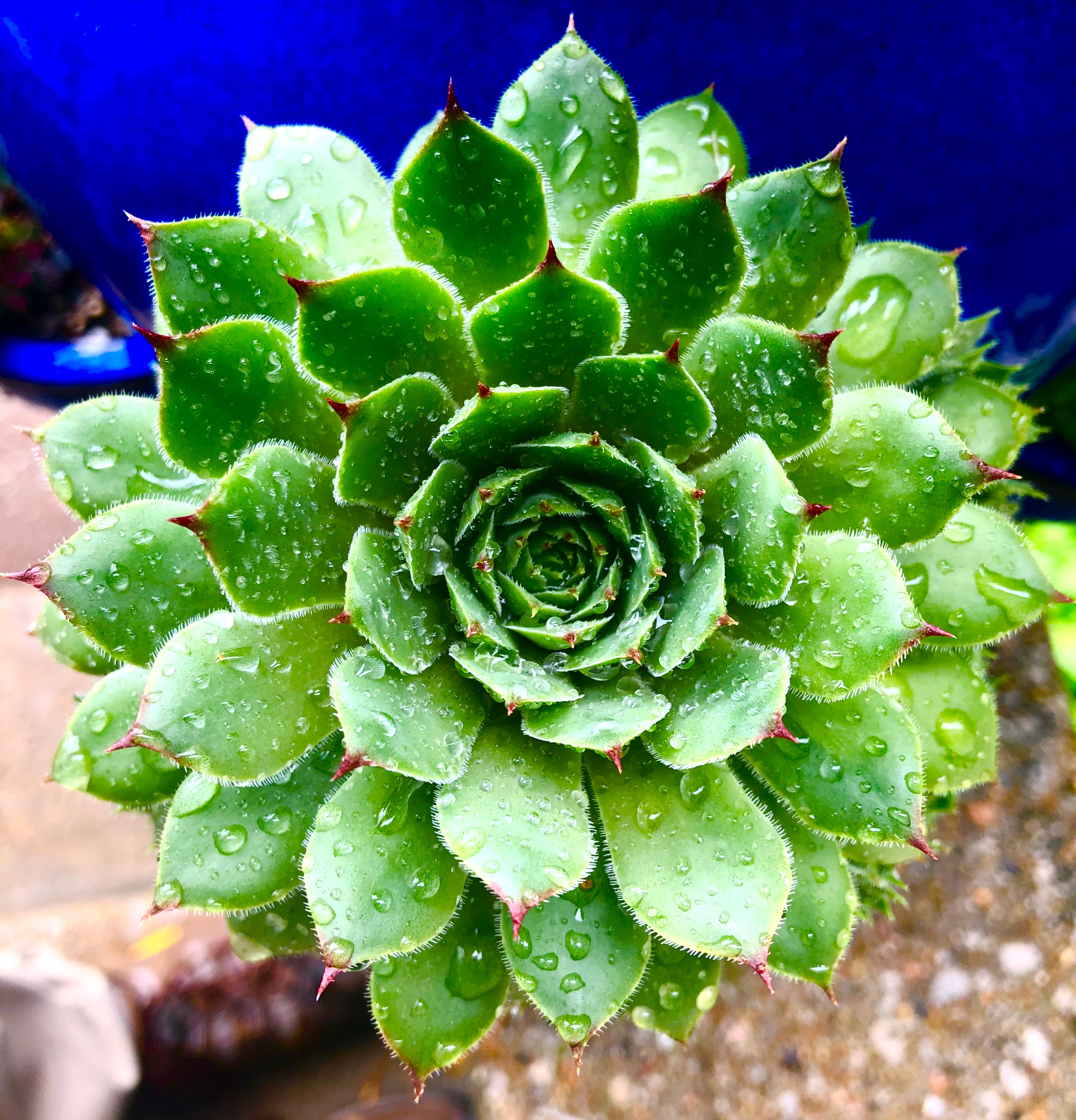
The hairs that fringe the leaves can be seen on close inspection

Other common names, such as Anglo-Saxon singrēne, Modern English sigrim, sil-green, etc. and aye-green, refer to its longevity. William Fernie tells a tale in support of this:

History relates that a botanist tried hard for eighteen months to dry a plant of the House Leek for his herbarium, but failed in this object. He afterwards restored it to its first site when it grew again as if nothing had interfered with its ordinary life.

It has been believed to protect more generally against decay and against witchcraft. Jacob Grimm quotes a Provençal troubadour: "e daquel erba tenon pro li vilan sobra lur maiso" — "and that plant they keep against evil atop their house." In his Capitulare de villis vel curtis imperii, Charlemagne recommended it be grown on top of houses. In some places, S. tectorum is still traditionally grown on the roofs of houses.

In Ireland, the houseleek was known as tóirpín and was placed over doorways and in cow-dung; it was believed to protect a house from lightning-strike or burning. Other names included buachaill tí ("house-boy"), roofleek, waxplant or luibh a’ tóiteáin ("herb of the fire").

The juice has been used in herbal medicine as an astringent and treatment for skin and eye diseases, including by Galen and Dioscorides, to ease inflammation and, mixed with honey, to treat thrush; however, large doses have an emetic effect. Pliny also mentions it, and Marcellus Empiricus listed it as a component in external treatments for contusions, nervous disorders, intestinal problems and abdominal pain, and mixed with honey, as part of the antidotum Hadriani (Hadrian's antidote), a broad-spectrum palliative for internal complaints.

Romans grew the plant in containers in front of windows and associated it with love medicine.

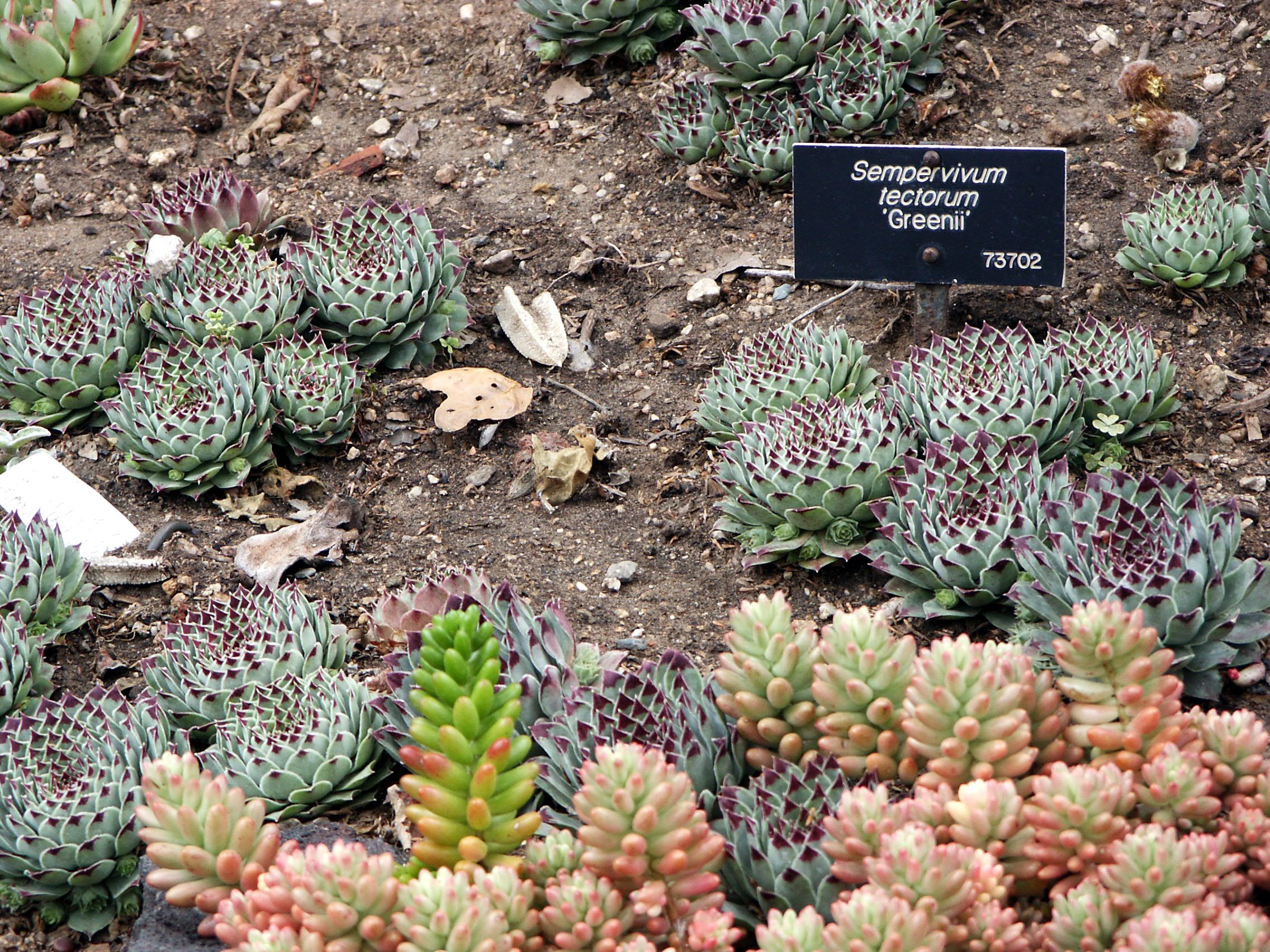
Sempervivum tectorum "Greenii", Huntington Desert Garden

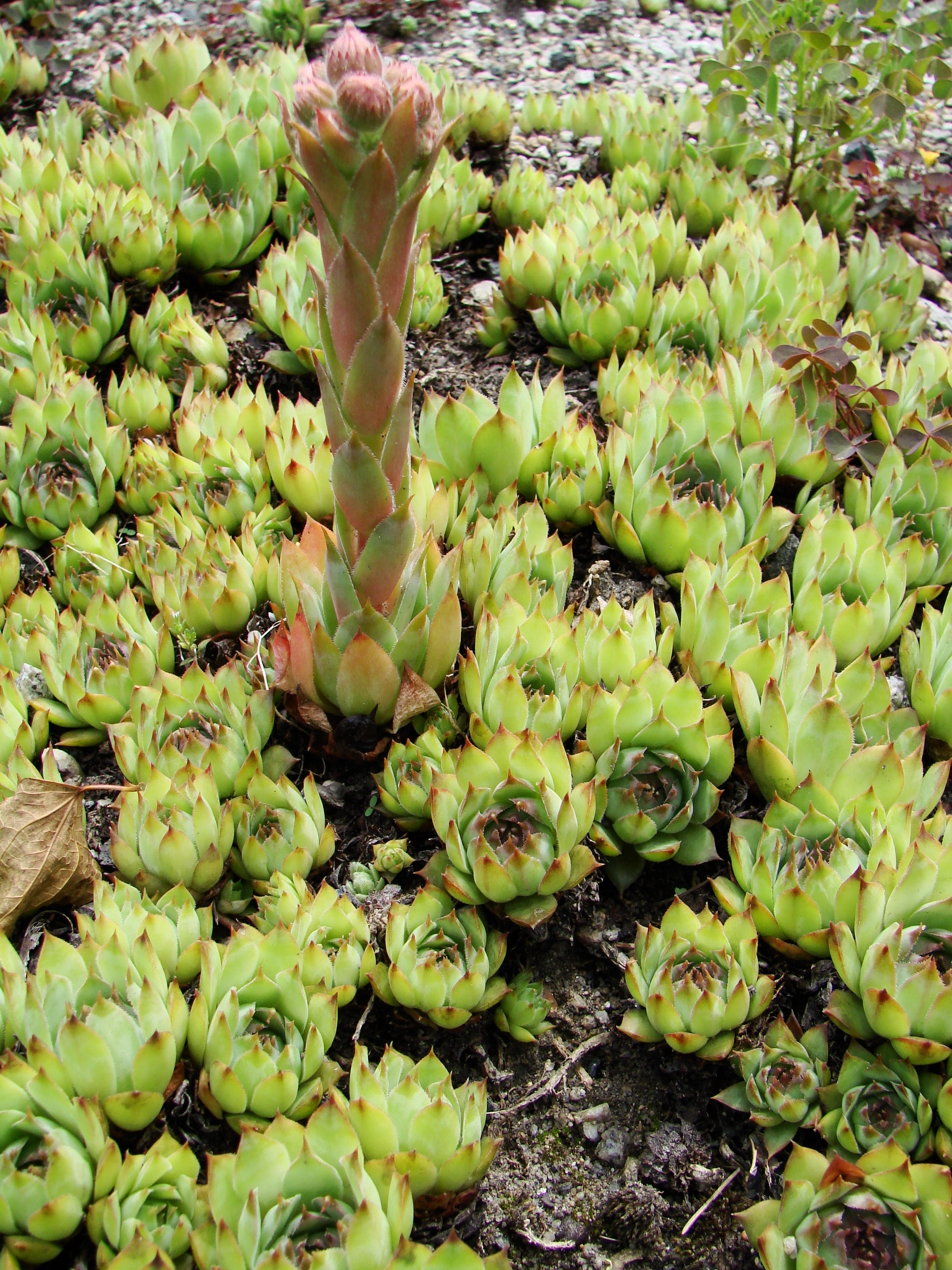
Sempervivum tectorum boutignyanum in flower

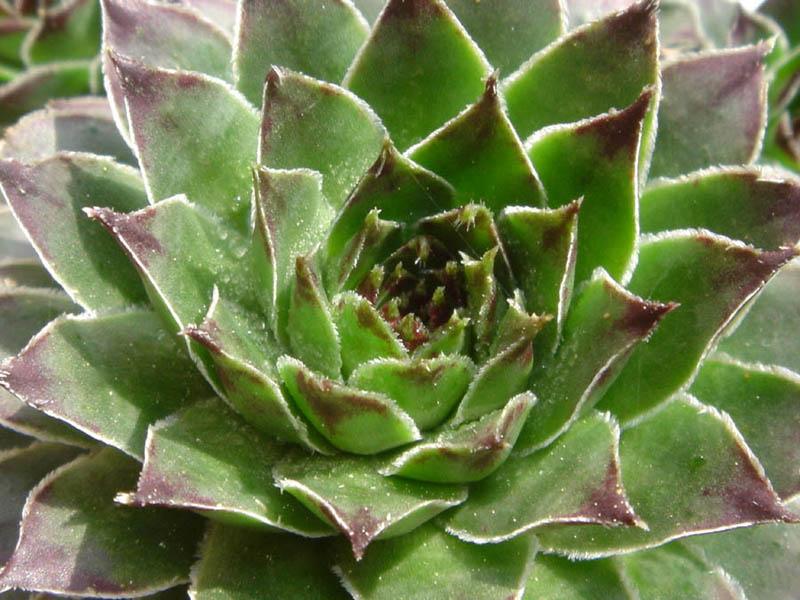
Rosette with drops of dew

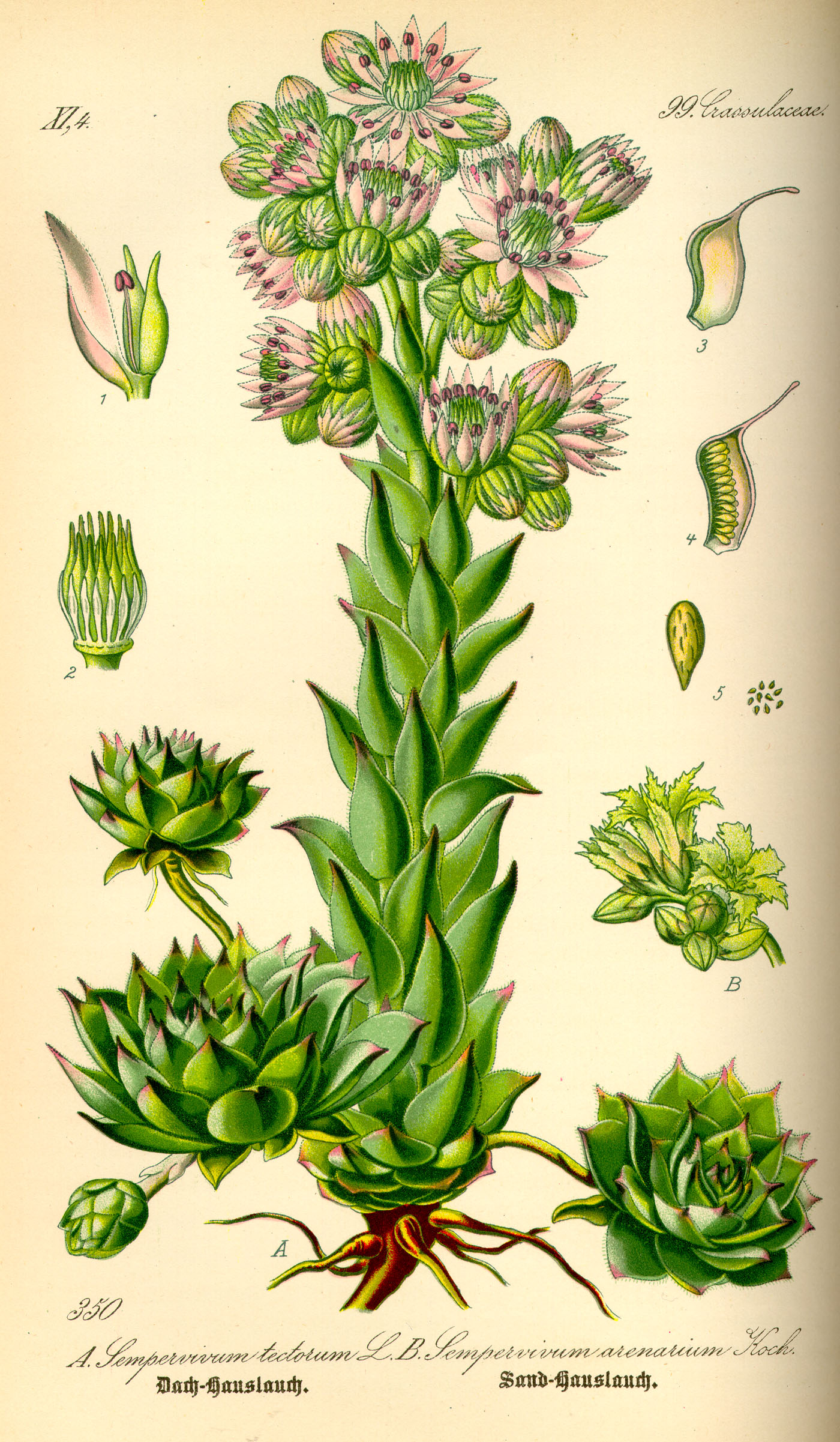
Illustration from Otto Wilhelm Thomé, Flora von Deutschland, Österreich und der Schweiz, 1885

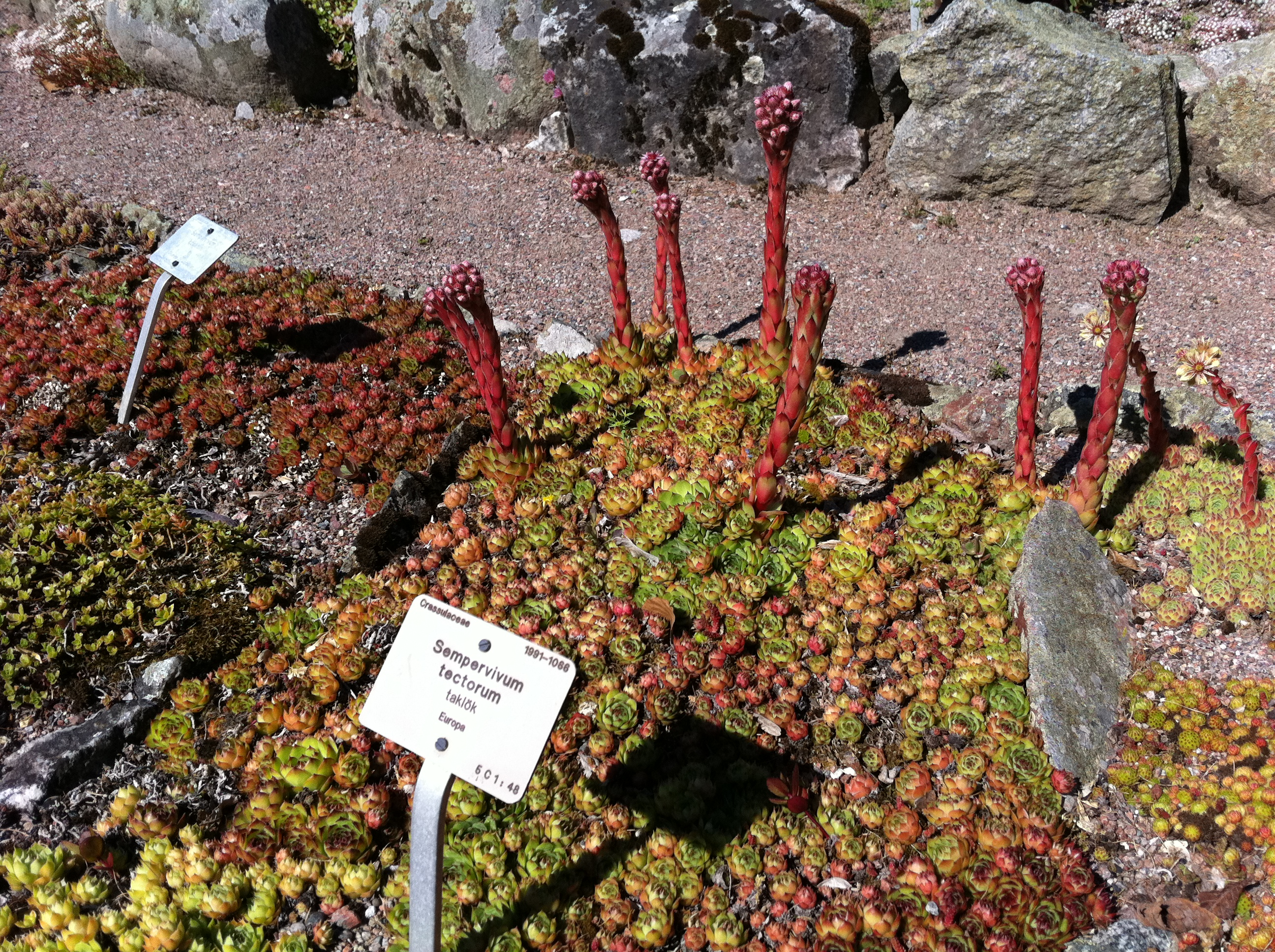
Sempervivum tectorum with flowers in Uppsala Botaniska Trädgården

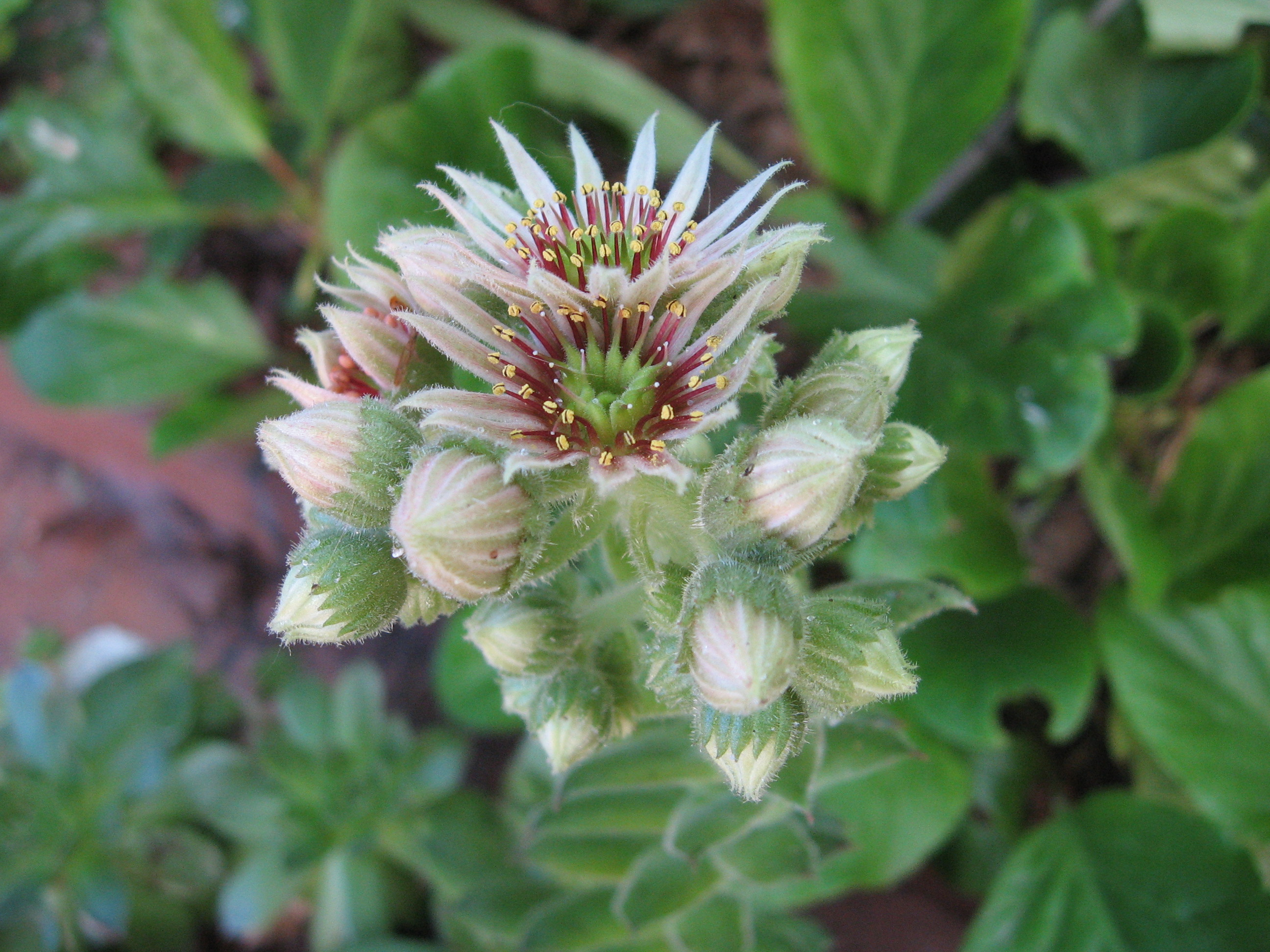
Flower of cultivated variety, photographed in Spain
