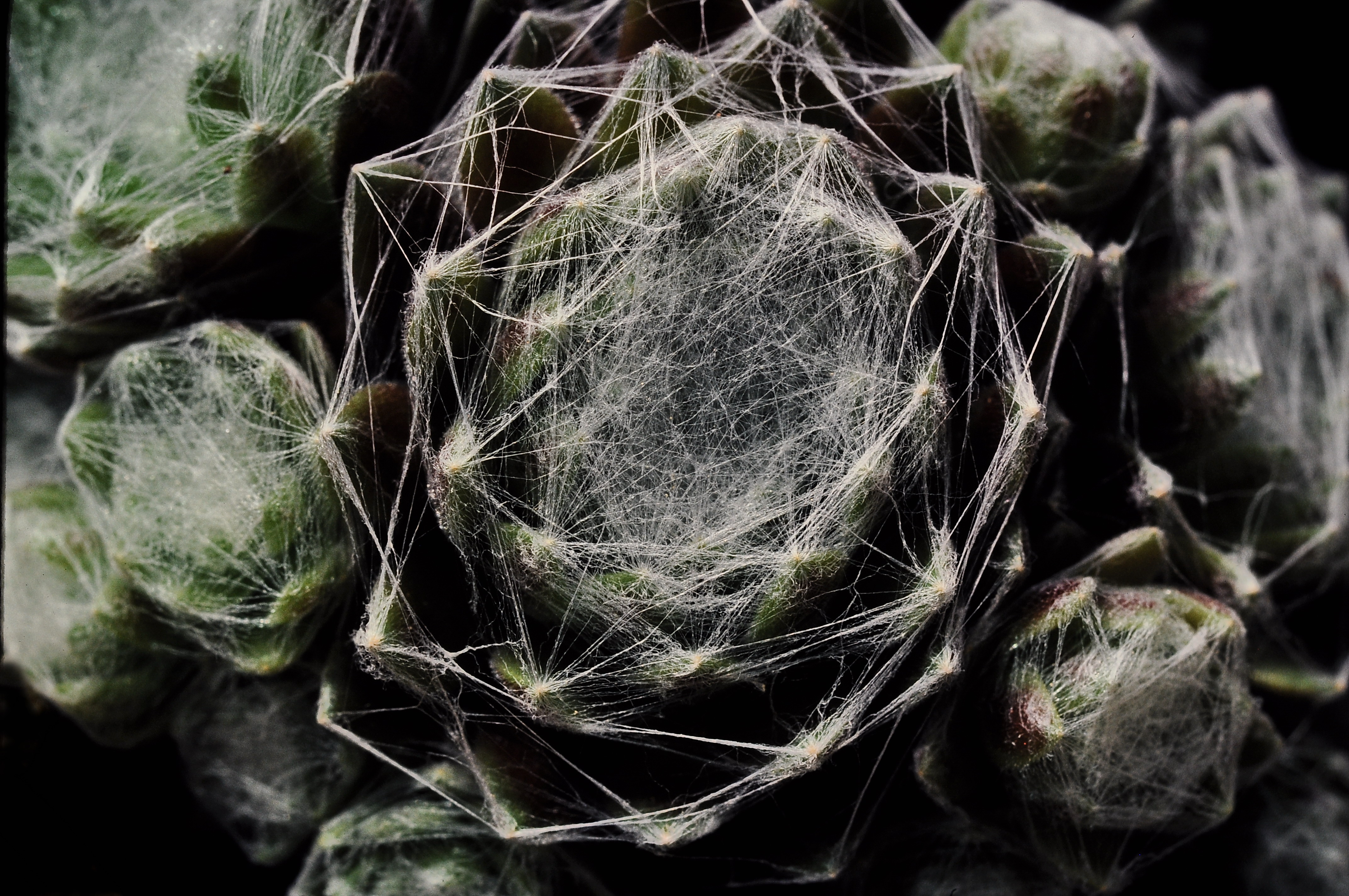

Scientific classification
- Kingdom: Plantae
- Clade: Tracheophytes
- Clade: Angiosperms
- Clade: Eudicots
- Order: Saxifragales
- Family: Crassulaceae
- Genus: Sempervivum
- Species: S. arachnoideum

Binomial name
- Sempervivum arachnoideum L.

= Sempervivum arachnoideum =

Species of succulent

Sempervivum arachnoideum, the cobweb house-leek, is a species of flowering plant in the family Crassulaceae, native to European mountains, in the Alps, Apennines and Carpathians. Growing to 8 cm (3 in) tall by 30 cm (12 in) wide, it is a rosette-forming succulent perennial, valued in cultivation for its ability to colonise hot, dry areas via offsets.

The specific epithet arachnoideum refers to its furry central rosettes (long ciliate leaf margins), resembling spider webs.

It flowers in July, with pink flowers that are raised on stems and are hermaphroditic (having both male and female organs).

This plant, and the subspecies Sempervivum arachnoideum subsp. tomentosum, have gained the Royal Horticultural Society's Award of Garden Merit.
