= Hen and chicken =

Hen and chicken, or variations thereof, may refer to:

== Places ==
- Hen and Chicken Bay, Sydney, Australia
- Hen and Chicken Islands, New Zealand
- Hen and Chicken Islands (Raquette Lake), New York state, US
- Hen and Chickens (reef), Florida, US

== Plants ==
- Hen and chicken fern, a plant (Asplenium bulbiferum) also known as mother spleenwort
- Hen and chicken plant, a common name for several unrelated groups of plants
- Hen and chicks, a common name for a group of small succulent plants

== Structures ==
- Hen and Chickens Shoal Light, Florida, US
- Hen and Chickens Theatre, London, UK
- Hen and Chickens, a former lightship station now protected by the Buzzards Bay Entrance Light, Massachusetts, U.S.

== Other ==
- Pentacycle, a human-powered five-wheeled vehicle also called "hen and chickens"
