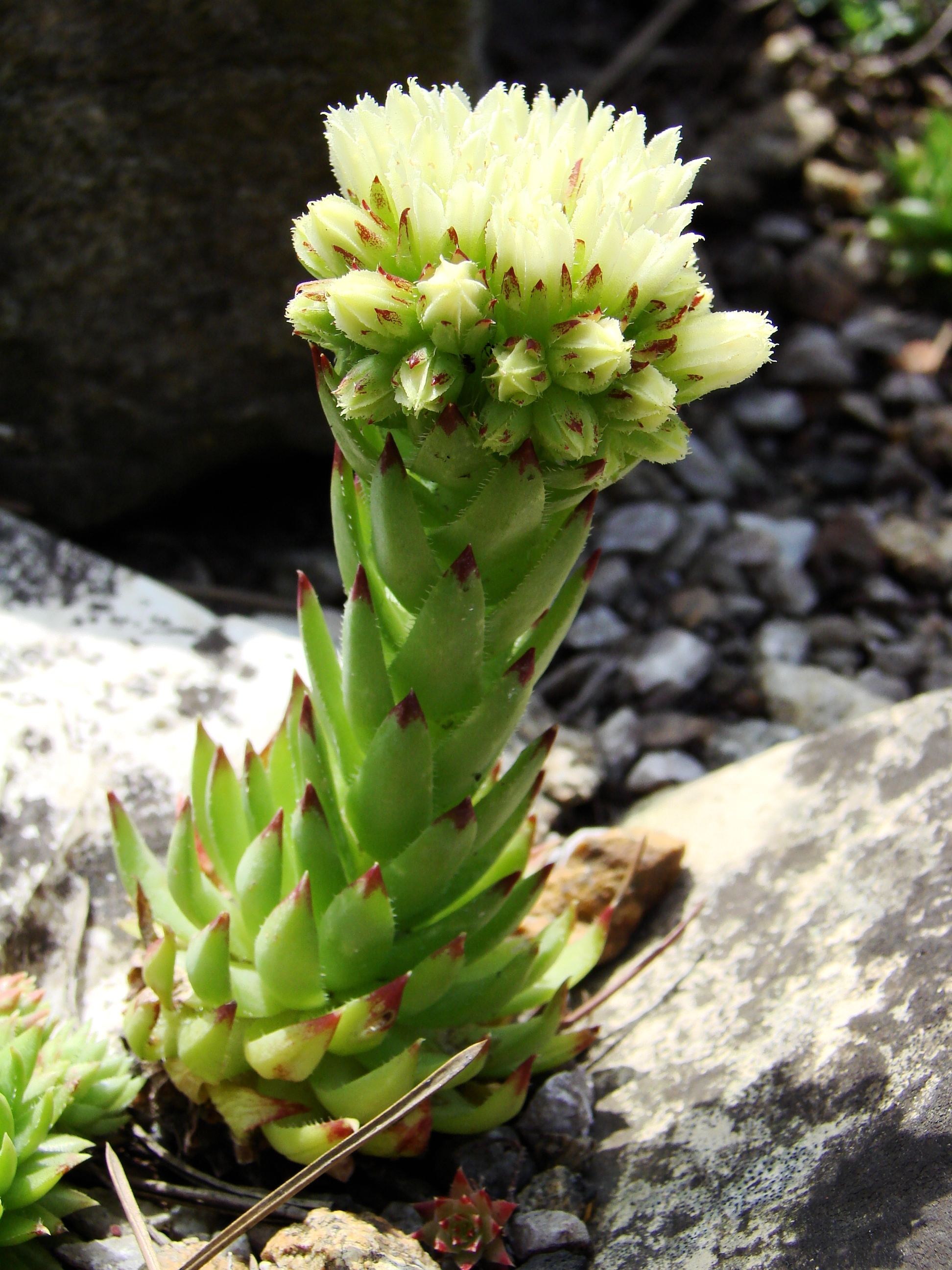
- Flower of Jovibarba globifera subsp. globifera
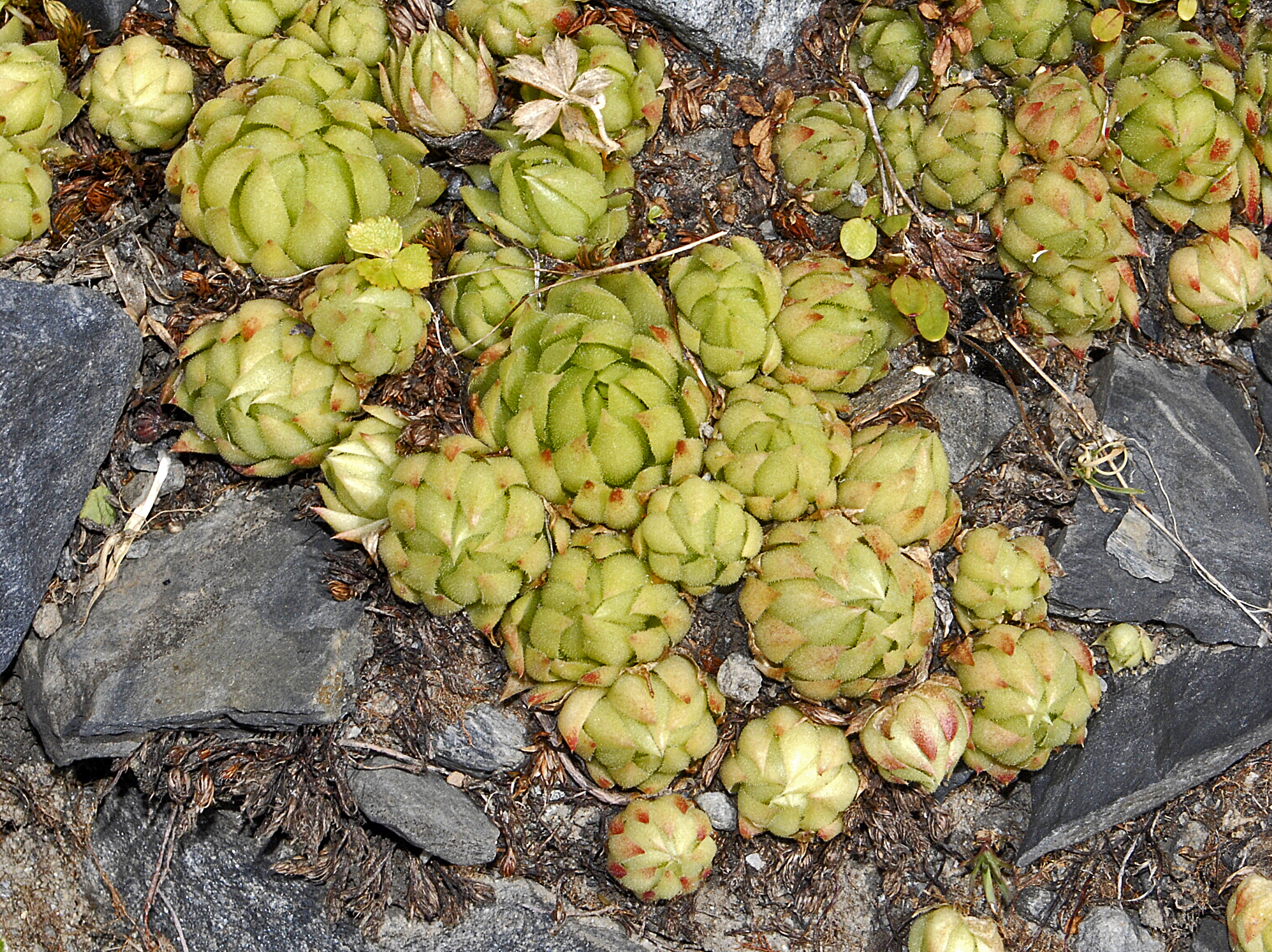
- rosettes of Jovibarba globifera subsp. allionii at the Giardino Botanico Alpino Chanousia

Scientific classification
- Kingdom: Plantae
- Clade: Tracheophytes
- Clade: Angiosperms
- Clade: Eudicots
- Order: Saxifragales
- Family: Crassulaceae
- Genus: Jovibarba
- Species: J. globifera

Binomial name
- Jovibarba globifera (L.) J. Parn.

Synonyms
- Jovibarba sobolifera; Sempervivum globiferum

= Jovibarba globifera =

Species of succulent

Jovibarba globifera, common name rolling hen-and-chicks, is a species of succulent flowering plant in the family Crassulaceae.

== Subspecies ==
- Jovibarba globifera subsp. allionii (Jord. & Fourr.) J. Parnell
- Jovibarba globifera subsp. arenaria (W. D. J. Koch) J. Parn.
- Jovibarba globifera subsp. globifera - Hens-and-chickens House-leek
- Jovibarba globifera subsp. hirta (L.) J. Parn.
- Jovibarba globifera subsp. lagariniana Gallo

== Description ==
Jovibarba globifera is a perennial herb with a hemispherical rosette of leaves of 2.5–4 centimetres (0.98–1.57 in) wide and a flower stem of 10–20 centimetres (3.9–7.9 in). Rosette leaf blades are spatulate, curved, fleshy, with entire margin, usually with reddish-brown tips, while stem leaf blades are ovate. These plants have pale-greenish-yellow or yellow actinomorphic campanulate flowers with six petals, about 1 centimetre (0.39 in) wide. They bloom from June to August.

Rolling hen-and-chicks produce small globe-shaped offsets ("globi") that are lightly attached and easily pop off and roll away from the mother plant. Offsets survive the main rosette, which is monocarpic. They reproduce via offsets in addition to producing seeds via sexual reproduction.

== Distribution ==
Jovibarba globifera lives in the eastern and southern Alps, the Carpathians and the western Balkans south to northern Albania.

== Habitat ==
This species can be found in mountainous regions in rocky areas at elevation of 1,100–2,200 metres (3,600–7,200 ft) above sea level.
