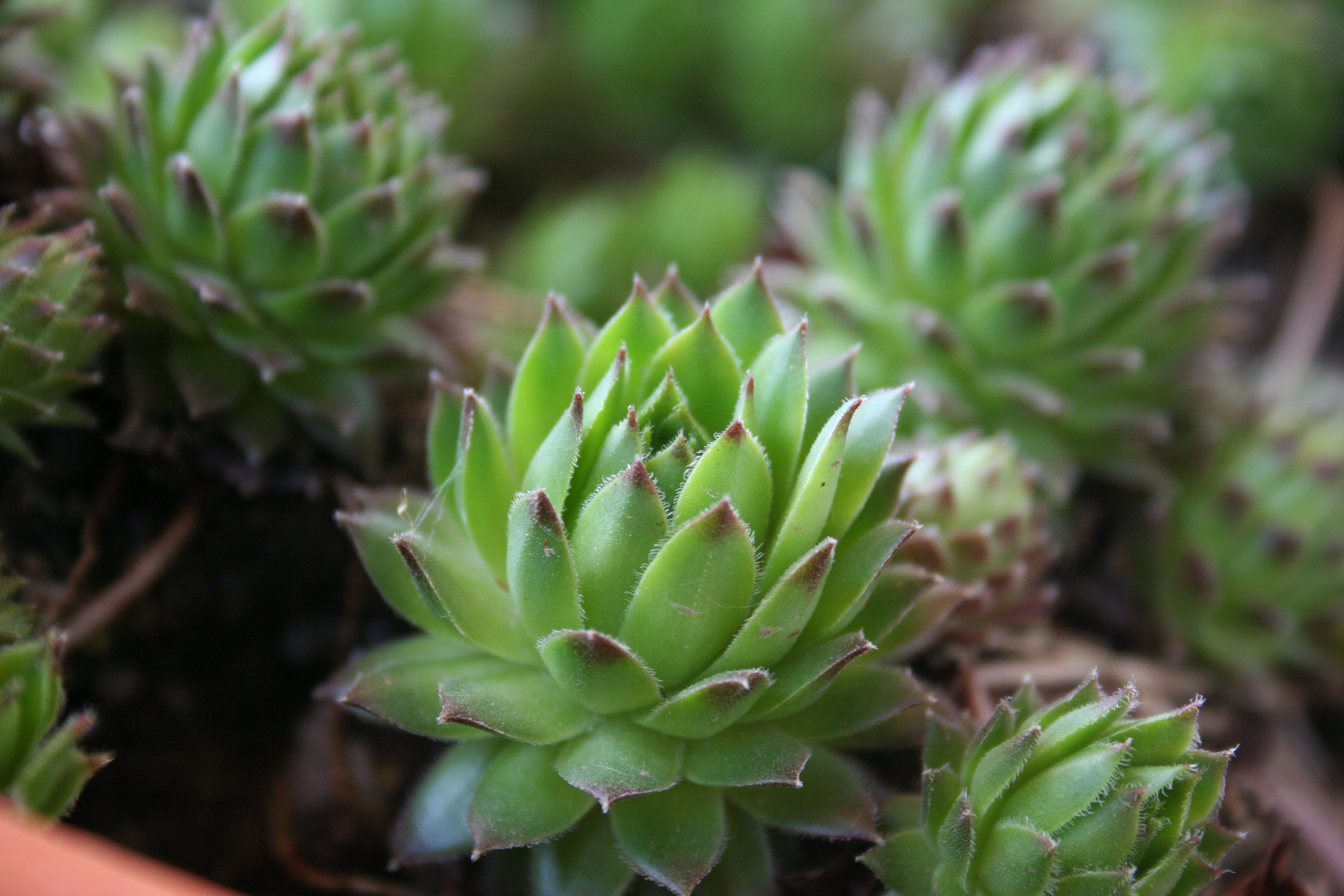
- Jovibarba globifera subsp. globifera (= Sempervivum globiferum subsp. globiferum), showing larger mother plants and smaller, globe-shaped offsets ("globi")

Scientific classification
- Kingdom: Plantae
- Clade: Embryophytes
- Clade: Tracheophytes
- Clade: Spermatophytes
- Clade: Angiosperms
- Clade: Eudicots
- Order: Saxifragales
- Family: Crassulaceae
- Genus: Jovibarba; Opiz

Species
- See text.

= Jovibarba =

Genus of succulents

Jovibarba ("beard of Jupiter") is a small genus of three species of succulent flowering plants in the family Crassulaceae, endemic to mountainous regions in the southeastern quadrant of Europe. The genus is sometimes classified as a subgenus of Sempervivum, to which it is closely related. Jovibarba have pale-greenish-yellow or yellow actinomorphic flowers with about six petals, while Sempervivum have generally pinkish flowers with around twice as many petals, which open more widely than jovibarba flowers. The common name hen and chicks is applied to some Jovibarba species (and also species in several other genera).

Most jovibarbas, like sempervivums, reproduce via offsets in addition to producing seeds via sexual reproduction. Jovibarba heuffelii does not produce offsets on stolons. Instead the offspring of this plant are produced within the mother plant. To propagate it must be split with a knife. The other two jovibarba species are commonly called rollers. They produce offsets that are lightly attached and easily pop off and roll away from the mother plant. Offsets survive the main rosette, which is monocarpic.

== Species ==
Only three species are accepted as distinct by the Flora Europaea:

- Jovibarba globifera (syn. J. sobolifera; Sempervivum globiferum)
- Jovibarba heuffelii (syn. J. velenovskyi; Sempervivum heuffelii)
- Jovibarba hirta (syn. Sempervivum hirtum)

Jovibarba globifera and its subspecies (subsp. hirtum, subsp. allionii, subsp. arenaria) live in the eastern and southern Alps, the Carpathians and the western Balkans south to northern Albania. J. heuffelii occurs in the remainder of the Balkans and the eastern Carpathians, southeast of J. globifera. J. hirta occurs further west, in the southwestern Alps.
