= Mother plant =

A mother plant is a plant grown for the purpose of taking cuttings or offsets in order to grow more quantity of the same plant.
