= Cutting (plant) =

Method of propagating plants

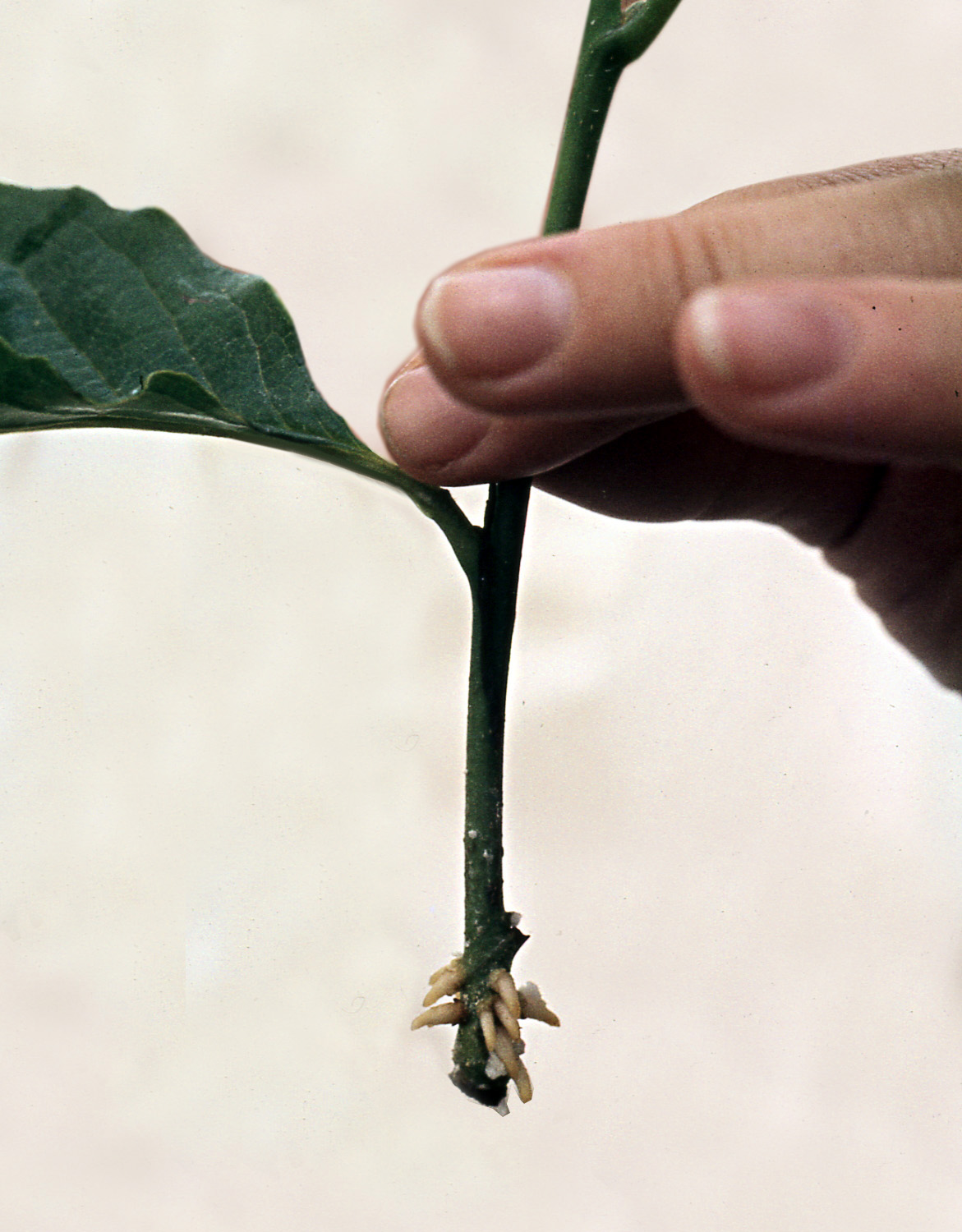
A magnolia stem cutting has been coaxed to form new roots, and is now a complete plant.

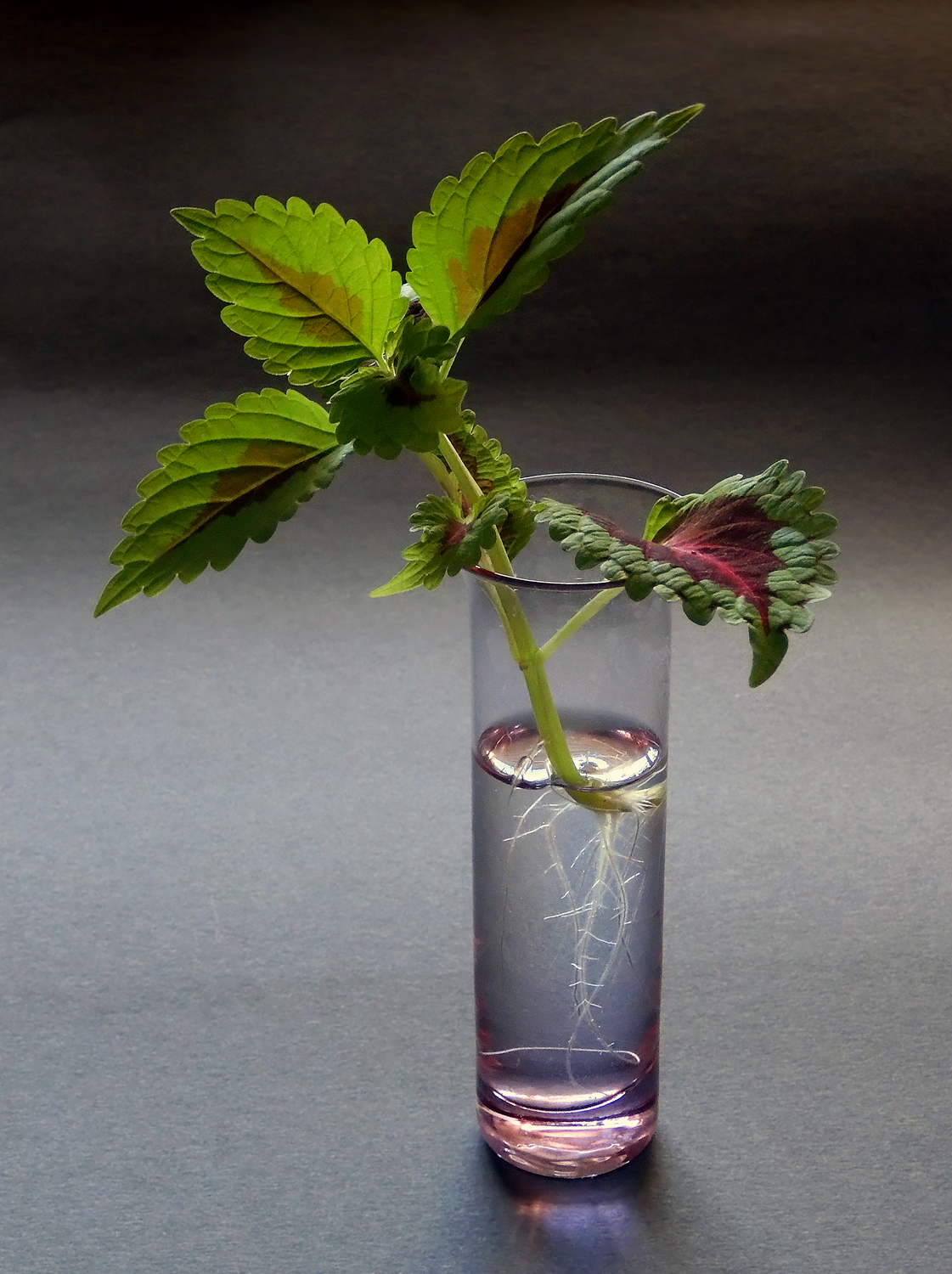
Cutting from Coleus scutellarioides – after 14 days the roots are 6 cm long.

A plant cutting is a piece of a plant that is used in horticulture for vegetative (asexual) propagation. A piece of the stem or root of the source plant is placed in a suitable medium such as moist soil. If the conditions are suitable, the plant piece will begin to grow as a new plant independent of the parent, a process known as striking. A stem cutting produces new roots, and a root cutting produces new stems. Some plants can be grown from leaf pieces, called leaf cuttings, which produce both stems and roots. The scions used in grafting are also called cuttings.

Propagating plants from cuttings is an ancient form of cloning. There are several advantages of cuttings, mainly that the produced offspring are practically clones of their parent plants. If a plant has favorable traits, it can continue to pass down its advantageous genetic information to its offspring. This is especially economically advantageous as it allows commercial growers to clone a certain plant to ensure consistency throughout their crops.

== Evolutionary advantage: Succulents ==
Cuttings are used as a method of asexual reproduction in succulent horticulture, commonly referred to as vegetative reproduction. A cutting can also be referred to as a propagule. Succulents have evolved with the ability to use adventitious root formation in reproduction to increase fitness in stressful environments. Succulents grow in shallow soils, rocky soils, and desert soils. Seedlings from sexual reproduction have a low survival rate; however, plantlets from the excised stem cuttings and leaf cuttings, broken off in the natural environment, are more successful.

Cuttings have both water and carbon stored and available, which are resources needed for plant establishment. The detached part of the plant remains physiologically active, allowing mitotic activity and new root structures to form for water and nutrient uptake. Asexual reproduction of plants is also evolutionarily advantageous as it allows plantlets to be better suited to their environment through retention of epigenetic memory, heritable patterns of phenotypic differences that are not due to changes in DNA but rather histone modification and DNA methylation. Epigenetic memory is heritable through mitosis, and thus advantageous stress response priming is retained in plantlets from excised stem.

== Physiology ==
Adventitious root formation refers to roots that form from any structure of a plant that is not a root; these roots can form as part of normal development or due to a stress response. Adventitious root formation from the excised stem cutting is a wound response.

At a molecular level when a cutting is first excised at the stem there is an immediate increase in jasmonic acid, known to be necessary for adventitious root formation. When the cutting is excised from the original root system the root-inhibiting hormones, cytokinin and strigolactone, which are made in the root and transported to the stem, decrease in concentration. Polyphenol degradation decreases, increasing auxin concentration. The increased auxin concentration increases nitric oxide concentration which initiates root formation through a MAPK signal cascade and a cGMP-dependent pathway that both regulate mitotic division and are both necessary for the initiation of adventitious root formation. The root primordia form from cambial cells in the stem. In propagation of detached succulent leaves and leaf cuttings, the root primordia typically emerges from the basal callous tissue after the leaf primordia emerges.

It was known as early as 1935 that when indolyl-3-acetic acid (IAA), also known as auxin, is applied to the stem of root cuttings, there is an increase in the average number of adventitious roots compared to cuttings that are not treated. Researchers also applied this compound to stems without leaves that normally would not have any root formation and found that auxin induced root formation, thus determining auxin is necessary for root formation. Identification of this hormone has been important to industries that rely on vegetative propagation, as it is sometimes applied to fresh cuttings to stimulate root growth.

== Technique ==
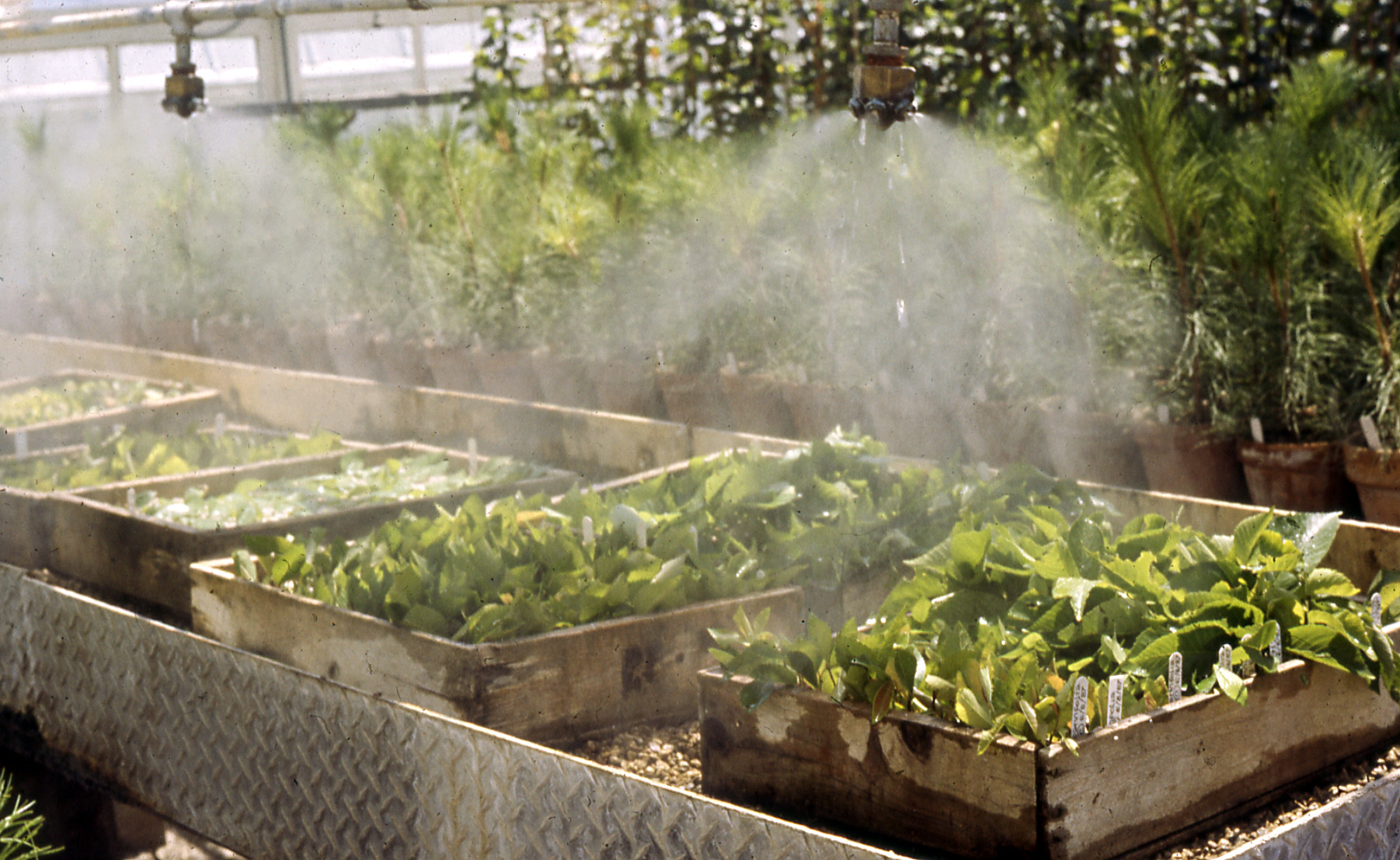
Softwood cuttings of elm (Ulmus) are kept under a water mist to prevent them from drying out while they form roots.

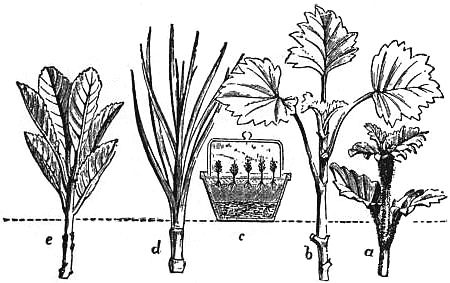
Cuttings from a variety of plants.

Some plants form roots much more easily than others. Stem cuttings from woody plants are treated differently, depending on the maturity of the wood:

- Softwood cuttings come from stems that are rapidly expanding, with young leaves. In many species, such cuttings form roots relatively easily.
- Semi-hardwood cuttings come from stems that have completed elongation growth and have mature leaves.
- Hardwood cuttings come from fully matured stems, and are often propagated while dormant.

Most plant cuttings are stem pieces, and have no root system of their own, and are therefore likely to die from dehydration if the proper conditions are not met. They require a moist medium, which, however, cannot be too wet lest the cutting rot. A number of media are used in this process, including but not limited to soil, perlite, vermiculite, coir, rock wool, expanded clay pellets, and even water given the right conditions. Most succulent cuttings can be left in open air until the cut surface dries, which may improve root formation when the cutting is later planted.

In temperate countries, stem cuttings may be taken of soft (green or semi-ripe) wood and hard wood, which have specific differences in practice. Certain conditions lead to more favorable outcomes for cuttings; timing, size, location on the plant, and amount of foliage are all important. Stem cuttings of young wood should be taken in spring from the upper branches, while cuttings of hardened wood should be taken in winter from the lower branches. Common bounds on the length of stem cuttings are between 5 and 15 centimetres (2.0 and 5.9 in) for soft wood and between 20 and 25 centimetres (7.9 and 9.8 in) for hard wood. Soft wood cuttings do best when about two thirds of the foliage are removed, while hard wood stem cuttings need complete foliage removal. The cut needs to be done either immediately below a node, or up to 1/2 inch below a node.

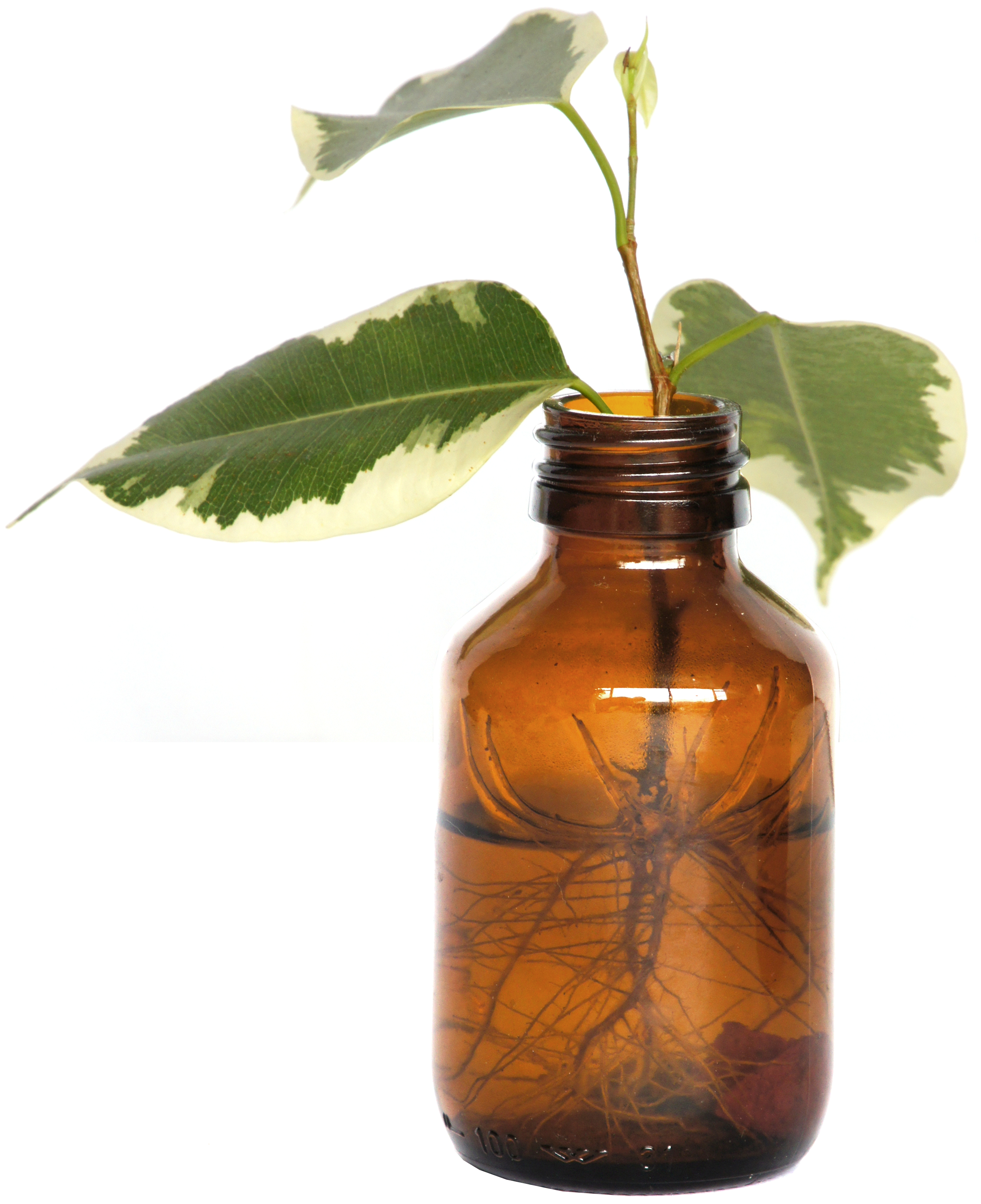
Ficus cuttings rooting in water

Besides placing the cuttings directly into soil, it is also possible to root cuttings in water. The water needs to be replaced often, to prevent bacteria buildup and the possibility of root rot. It also requires enough oxygen in the water for the same reason. A moist atmosphere (use of plastic sheeting) is hence not needed with this technique.

The environment for softwood and semi-hardwood cuttings is generally kept humid—often attained by placing the cuttings under a plastic sheet or in another confined space where the air can be kept moist—and in partial shade to prevent the cutting from drying out. Cuttings in the medium are typically watered with a fine mist to avoid disturbing the plants. Following the initial watering, the aim is to keep the soil moist but not wet or waterlogged; the medium is allowed to almost dry out before misting again.

A rooting hormone may be administered to "encourage" growth and can increase the success rate of plant growth. Though not essential, several compounds may be used to promote the formation of roots through the signaling activity of plant hormone auxins. Among the commonly used chemicals is indole-3-butyric acid (IBA) used as a powder, liquid solution, or gel. This compound is applied either to the cut tip of the cutting or as a foliar spray. Rooting hormone can be manufactured naturally, such as soaking the yellow-tipped shoots of a weeping willow tree in water, or by preparing a tea from the bark of a willow tree. Shoots or bark do better when soaked for 24 hours prior to using. The extract obtained from the crushing of leaves and bulbs of coco-grass (Cyperus rotundus) is used as an excellent rooting trigger for cuttings and seedlings of various plant species. Honey, though it does not contain any plant hormones, can also aid in rooting success through its natural antiseptic and antifungal properties. Cinnamon or an Aspirin tablet in water can also aid the rooting process.

== Types ==
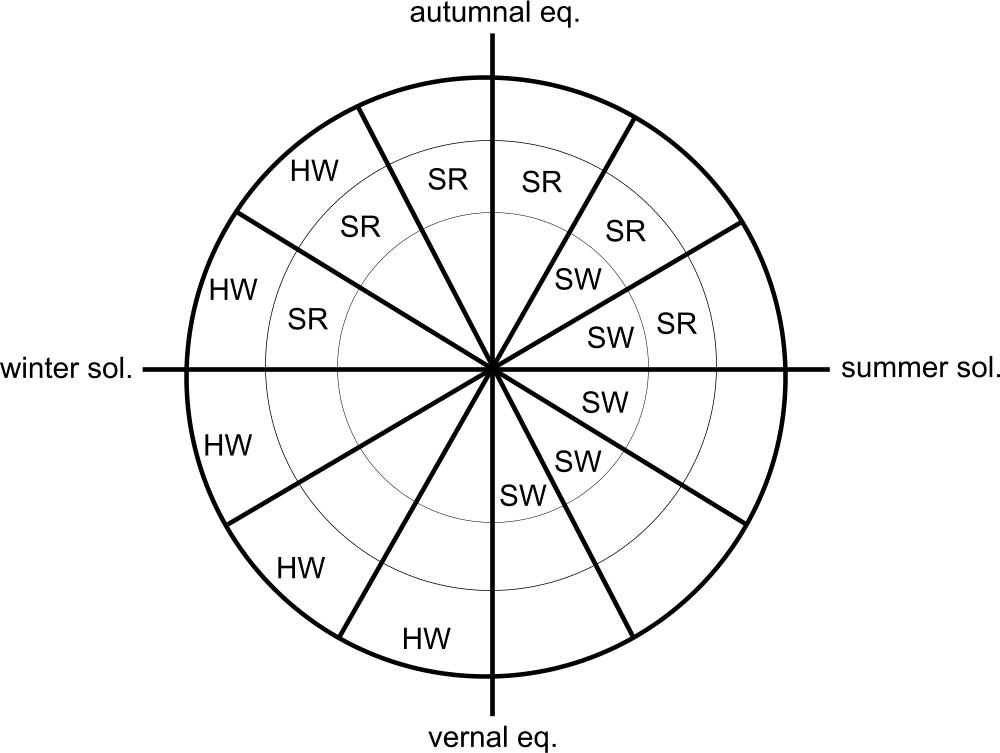
Scheme of appropriate type of stem cuttings according to season. Key: eq.:equinox, sol.: solstice, HW: hardwood, SR: semi-ripe, SW: softwood.

Many vegetative parts of a plant can be used. The most common methods are:

- Stem cuttings, in which a piece of stem is part buried in the soil, including at least one leaf node. The cutting is able to produce new roots, usually at the node.
- Root cuttings, in which a section of root is buried just below the soil surface, and produces new shoots.
- Scion cuttings are used in grafting.
- Leaf cuttings, in which a leaf is placed on moist soil. These have to develop both new stems and new roots. Some leaves will produce one plant at the base of the leaf. In some species, multiple new plants can be produced at many places on one leaf, and these can be induced by cutting the leaf veins. The leaf cutting method is commonly used with succulents.

Although some species, such as willow, blackberry and pelargoniums can be grown simply by placing a cutting into moist ground, the majority of species require more attention. Most species require humid, warm, partially shaded conditions to strike, thus requiring the approach above to be followed. Particularly difficult species may need cool air above and warm soil. In addition, with many more difficult cuttings, one should use the type of cutting that has the most chance of success with that particular plant species.

== Improving results ==
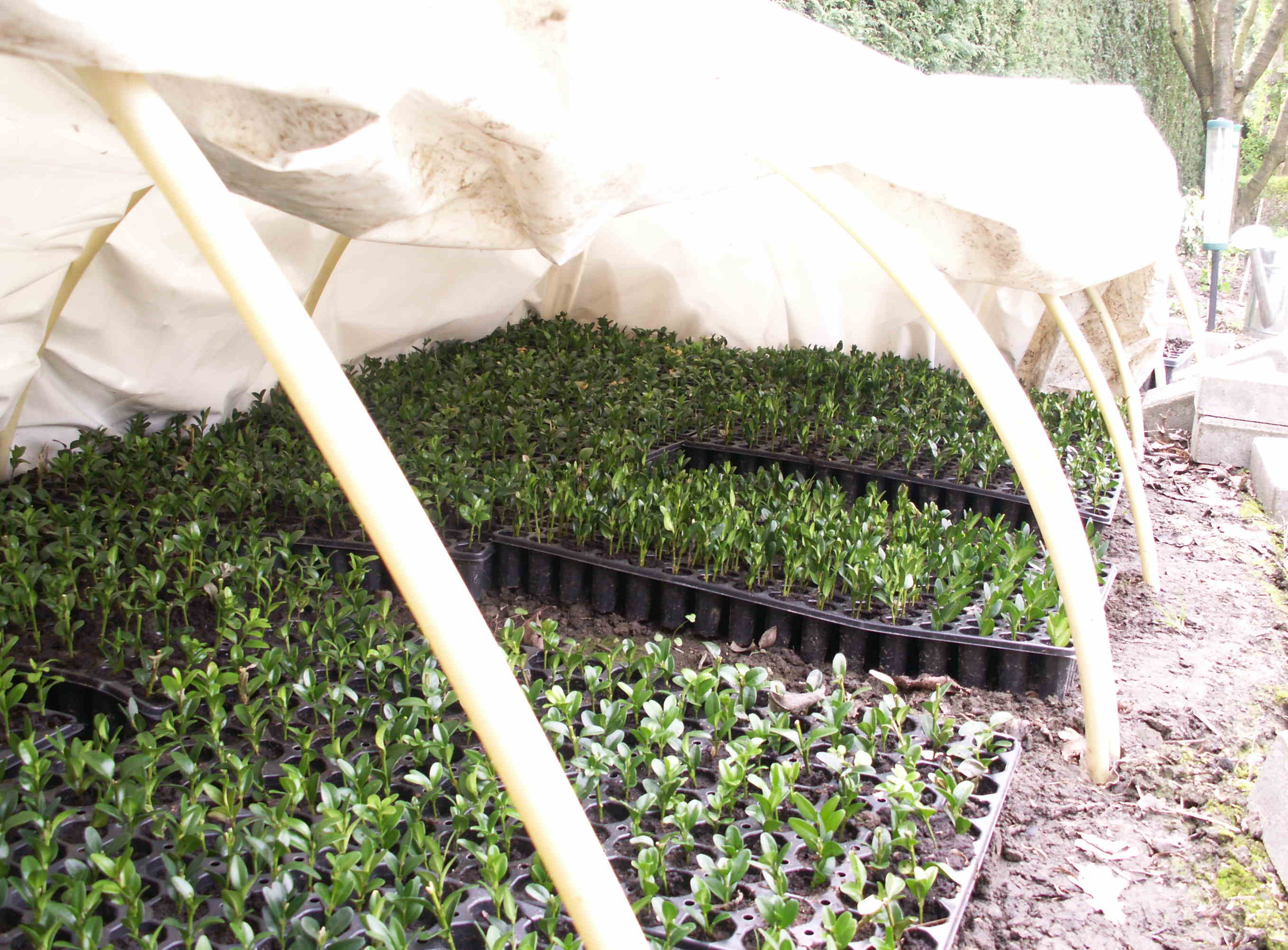
A plastic cold frame with semi-white plastic, used to keep the cuttings humid and semi-shaded

There are ways of improving the growth of stem cutting propagations. Intensifying light allows cuttings to root and sprout faster, though the heat thus generated could cause the propagation material distress. Azalea cuttings can be mildly heated in water to disinfect it from the fungus pathogen Rhizoctonia, and this could potentially be used for other plants.

=== Soil ===
Depending on the type of cutting (i.e. tree, shrub, succulent, cacti) different potting soil mixes can be used. Many commercial companies sell medium specifically for growing cuttings.

=== Air and soil humidity ===
Although several options can be used here, usually plastic is used to cover the softwood and semi-hardwood cuttings. The soil below the trays (to increase air moisture) and the soil in the trays themselves is kept moist but not waterlogged (=completely saturated). The trays the cuttings sit in are best placed on stones to prevent capillary action (as this can keep the soil inside the trays too wet). Soil in the trays should be kept at 85 to 95% saturation. Automated (overhead) misting systems, boom systems or fog systems can be used in greenhouses.

A typical misting frequency during sticking and callusing includes misting for 5–8 seconds every 5–10 minutes over a 24-hour period. After 3 to 4 days, misting is reduced to 3–5 seconds every 10–20 minutes during the day and less frequently at night. When roots become visible (stage 3) misting can be reduced, and by stage 4 (toning), little to no misting should be done (by day 10 to 14 for most species). When using plastic tents, far less misting is needed (once or twice a day). The greenhouse or cold frame should be ventilated once in a while to prevent formation of molds (manually).

=== Air and soil temperature ===
Air temperature for softwood and semi-hardwood cuttings is optimal at around 70 °F (21.1 °C) but temperatures as low as 55 °F (12.7 °C) are acceptable. Heating the air above 75 °F (23.8 °C) stimulates the growth of pathogens. Ventilating (manually or through automatic window openers) the greenhouse or cold frame can lower the air temperature. Automated thermostat systems can also be used in greenhouses to keep the heat at a specific temperature. Bottom heating (soil) tends to be ideal for root initiation since growing media temperature is best maintained at 20-22 °C.

=== Sunlight ===
Whereas cuttings need to be kept warm and some amount of light needs to be provided, it needs to be kept out of direct sunlight. Some ways to accomplish this include using white wash, semi-white plastic, retractible shade curtains (which can be deployed if the sun temporarily pierces through).

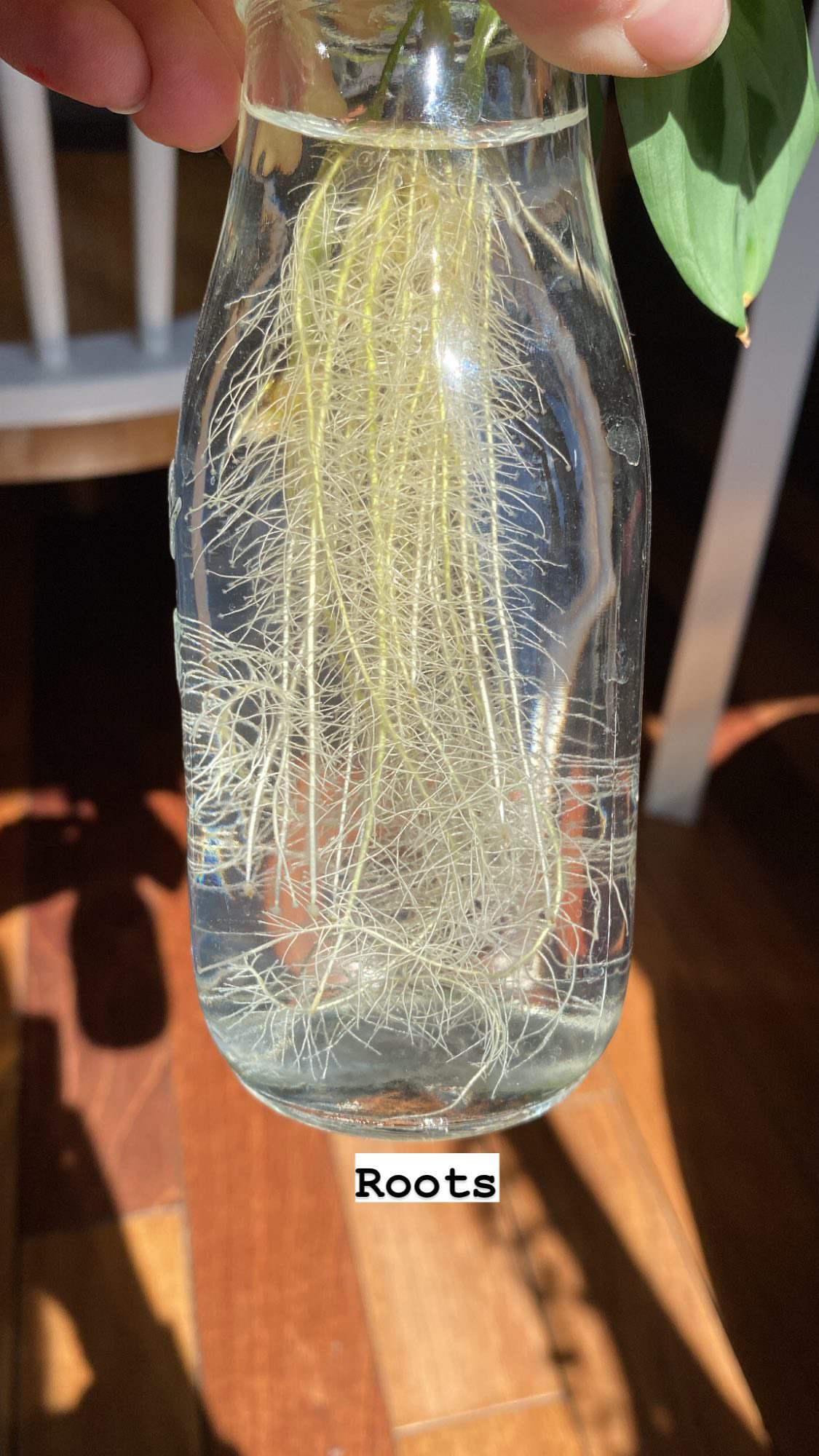

== Examples of plants that allow propagation from stem cuttings ==
- Fittonia (nerve plant)
- Ficus (fig)
- Maranta (prayer plant)
- Monstera (swiss cheese plant)
- Begonia

== Examples of plants that allow propagation from root cuttings ==
- Papaver (poppy)
- Rubus idaeus (red raspberry)
- Rubus allegheniensis (common blackberry)
- Phlox sp.
- Acanthus sp.

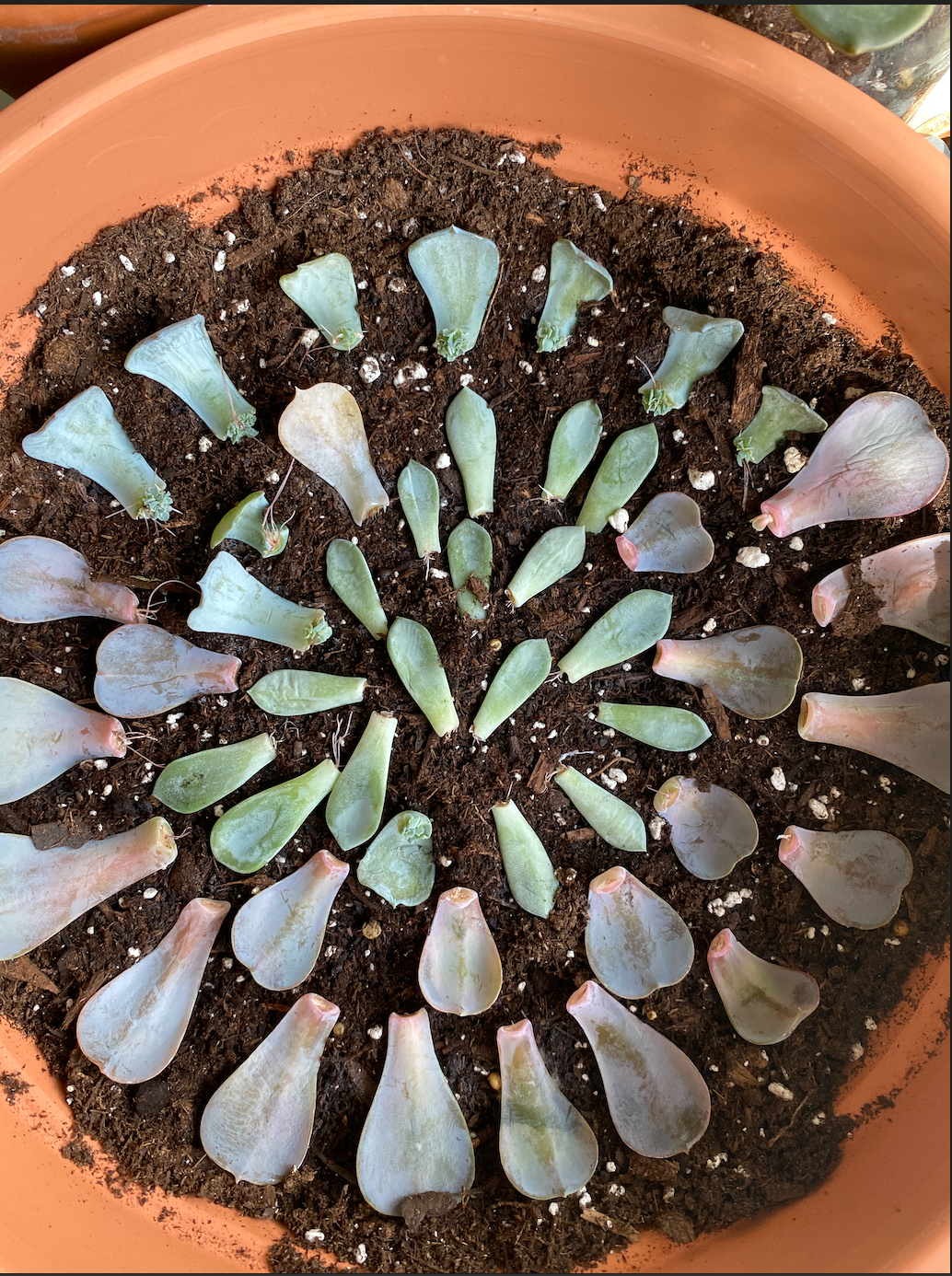

== Examples of plants that allow propagation from leaf cuttings ==
- Streptocarpus sect. Saintpaulia (African violet)
- Begonia sp.
- Echeveria sp. (hens and chicks)
- Dracaena trifasciata (snake plant)
- Hoya sp. (waxflower)

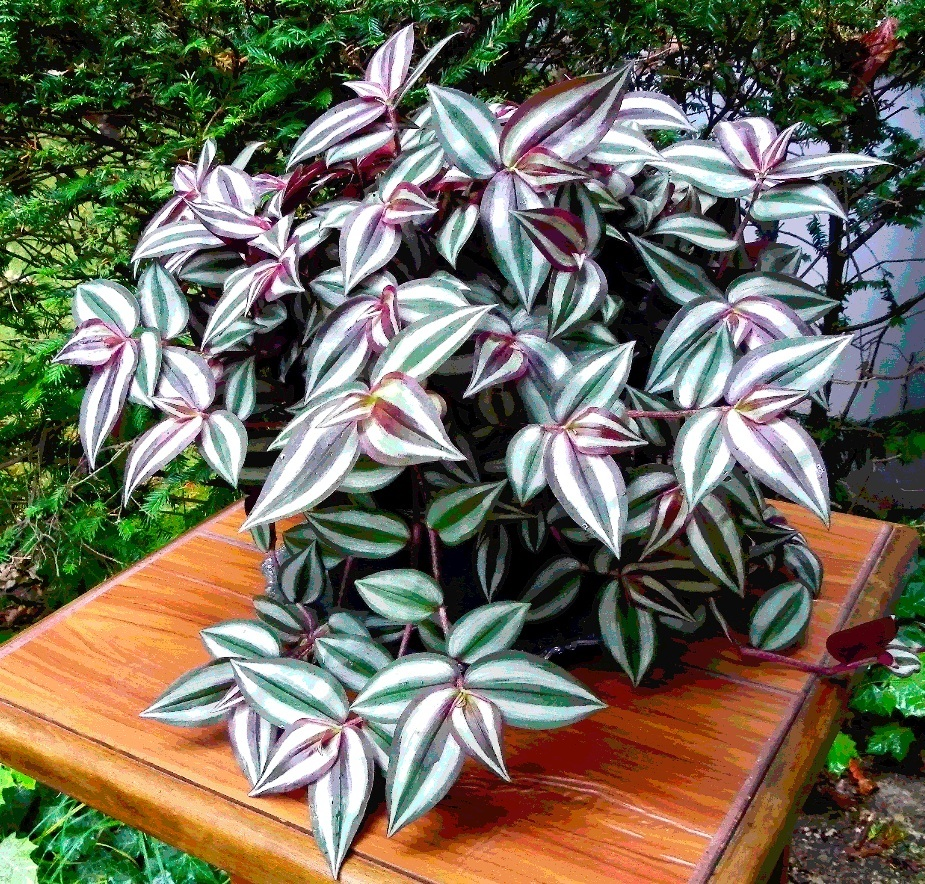
Propagated by cuttings, Inch Plants can be moved easily as its stolons cling lightly to the ground.

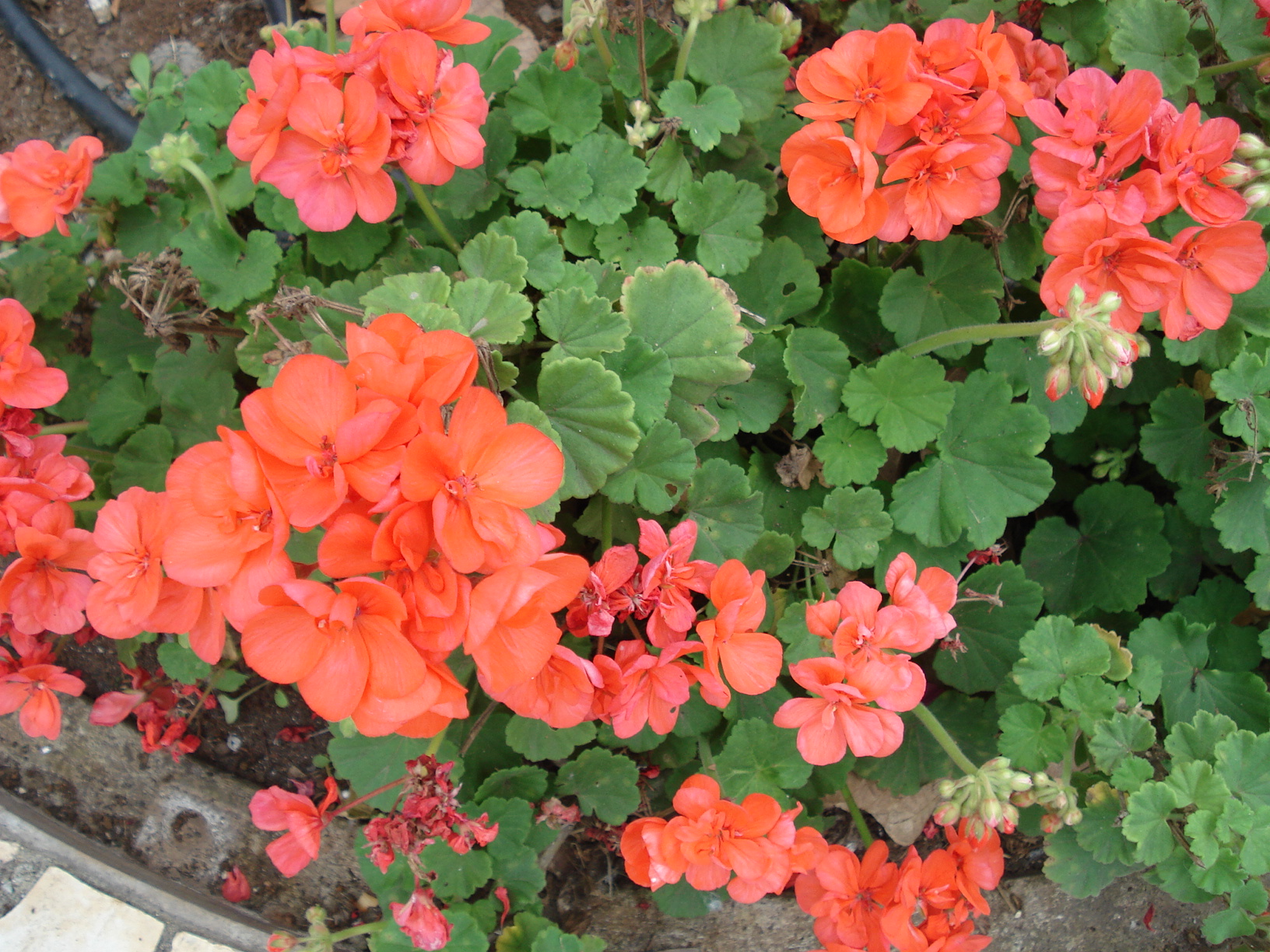
Pelargonium x hortorum (garden geraniums) are propagated by seeds and cuttings.

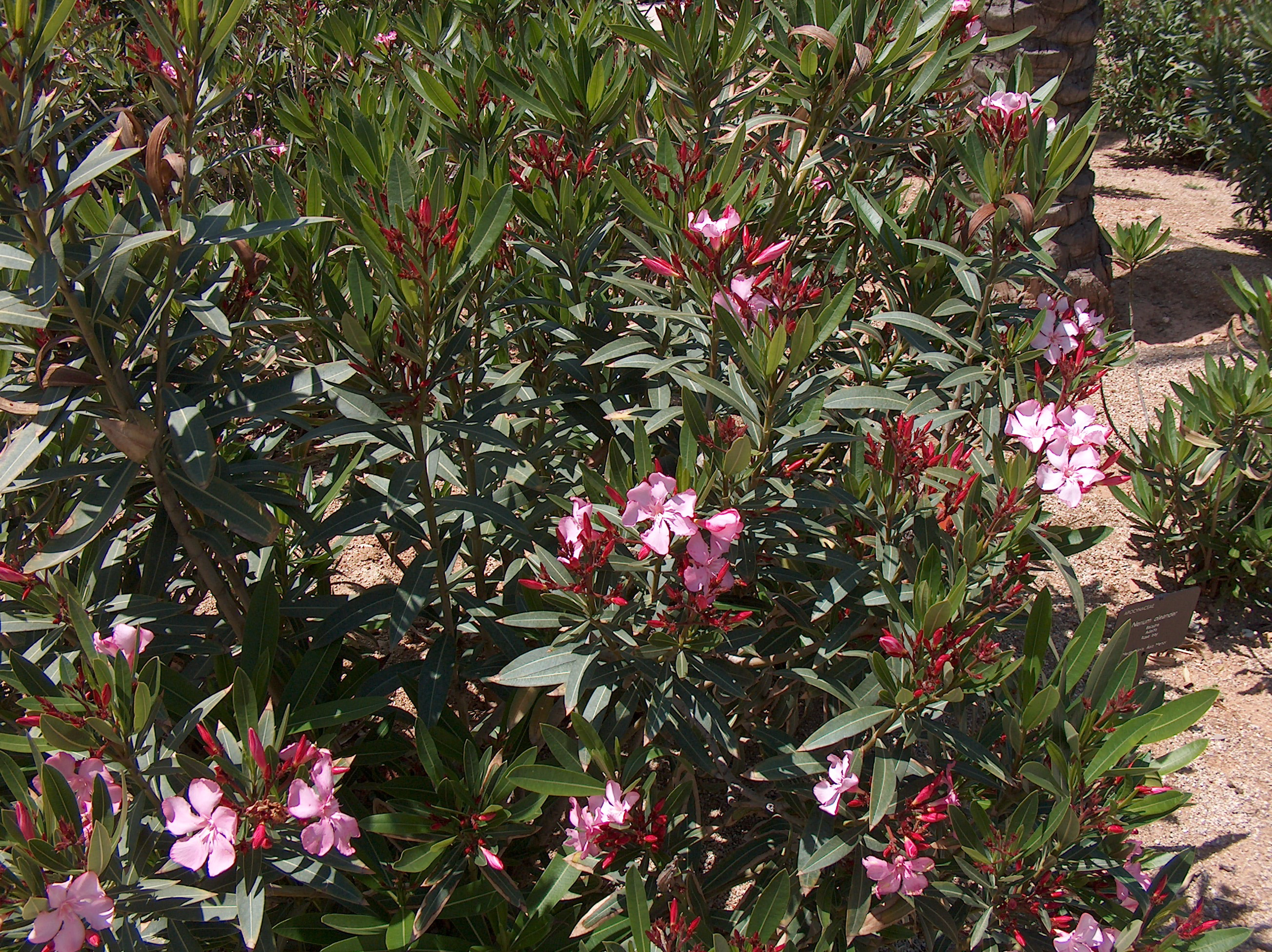
Nerium can readily root after being placed in water or in compost.

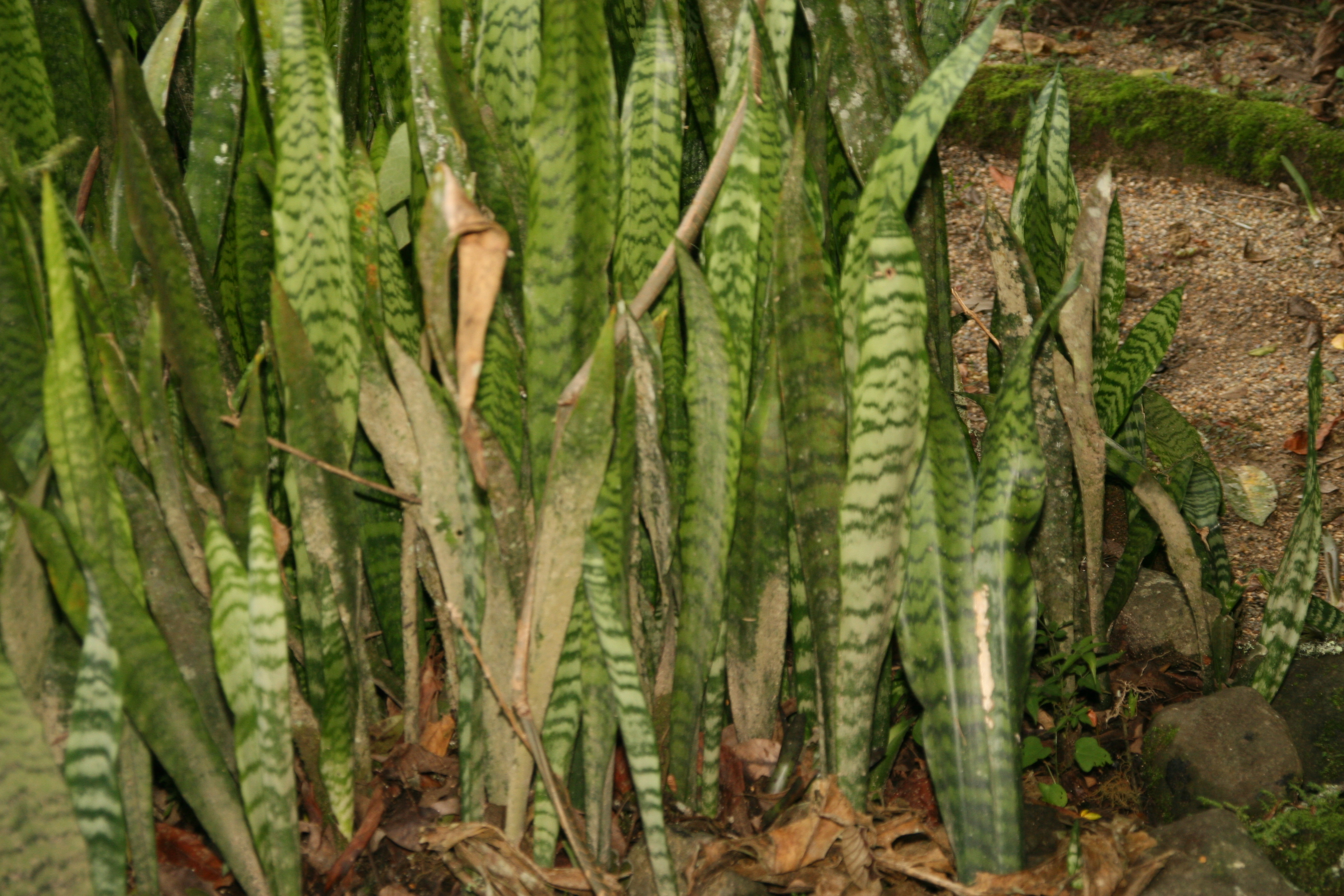
Snake plants are propagated by leaf cuttings or by dividing the rhizome (variegated plants will keep their yellow edges only by division).

== In popular culture ==
The poet Theodore Roethke wrote about plant cuttings and root growth behavior in his poems "Cuttings" and "Cuttings (Later)" found in his book The Lost Son: And Other Poems.

== See also ==
- Division (horticulture)
- Grafting
- Hemerochory
- Potting soil
- Propagule
- Propagation of grapevines
