= Hen and chicks =

Hens of chicks

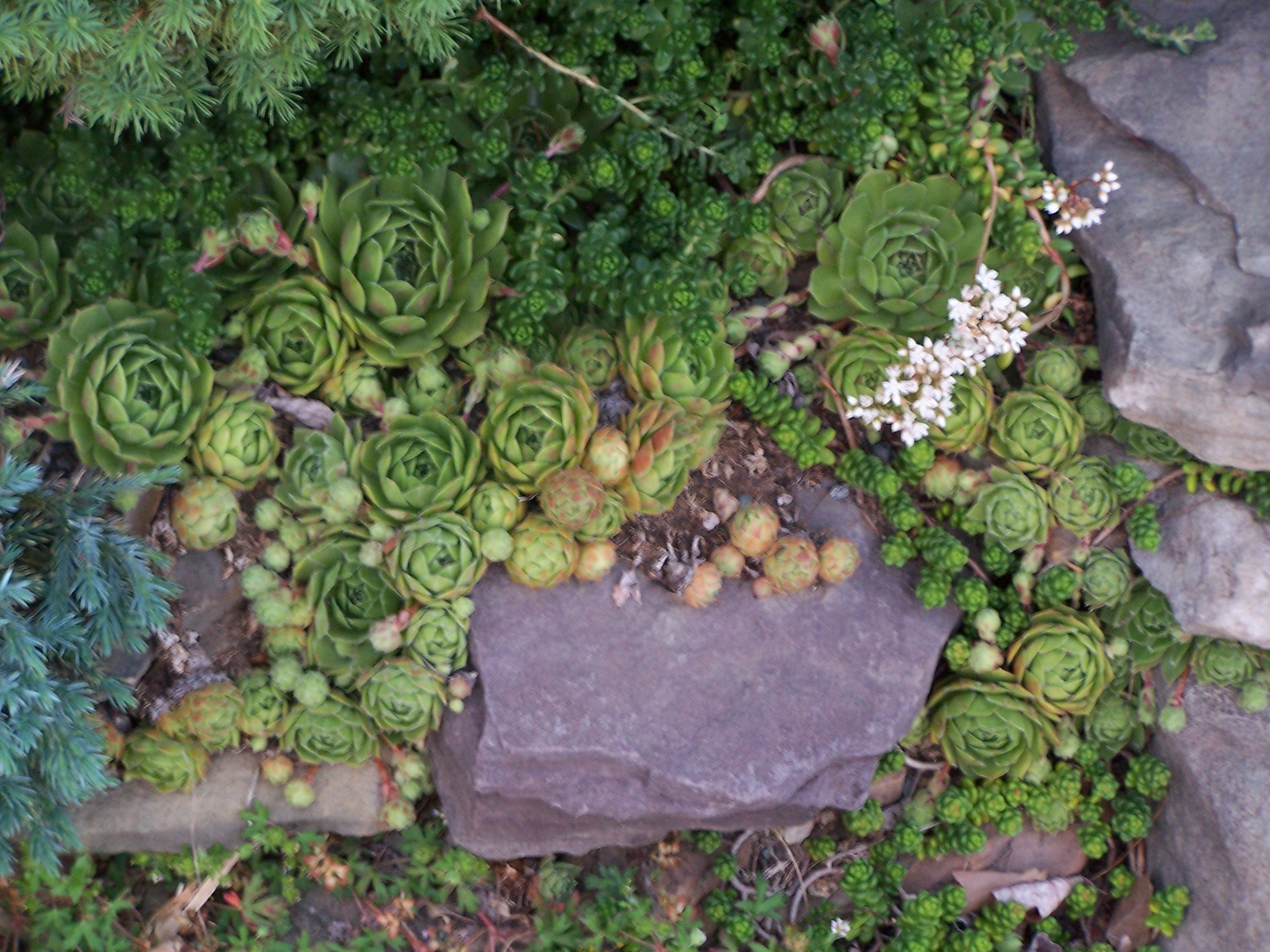
Jovibarba globifera (syn. Sempervivum globiferum) showing larger mother plants ("hens") and smaller, globe-shaped offsets ("chicks", "globi")

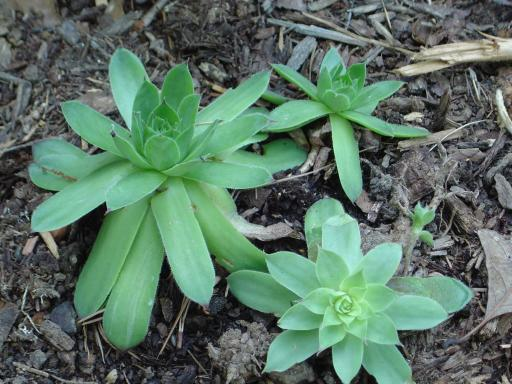
Sempervivum tectorum (common houseleek)

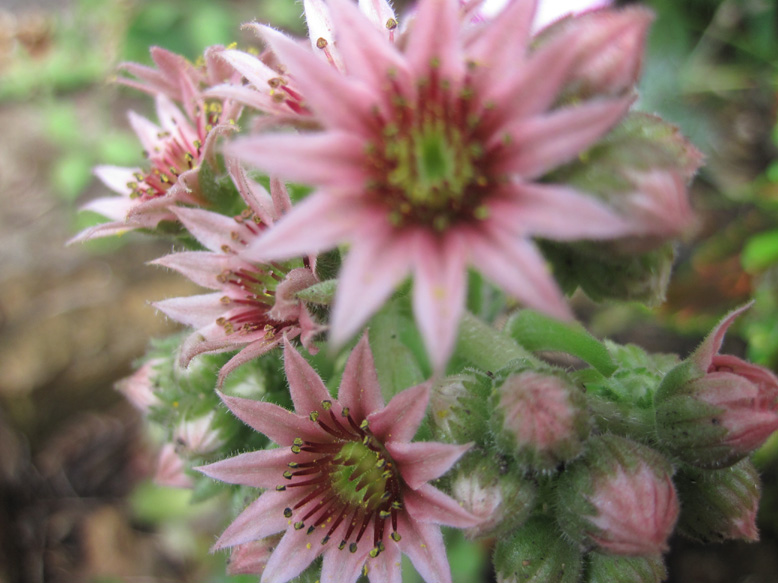
Close-up of blooms

Hen and chicks (also known as hen-and-chickens, or hen-widdies in the southern United States) is a common name for a group of small succulent plants. They belong to the flowering plant family Crassulaceae, native to southern Europe and northern Africa. The plants grow close to the ground with leaves formed around each other in a rosette, and propagating by offsets. The "hen" is the main, or mother, plant, and the "chicks" are a flock of offspring, which start as tiny buds on the main plant and soon sprout their own roots, taking up residence close to the mother plant.

Plants commonly referred to as "Hens and chicks" include ground-hugging species of Sempervivum (houseleeks) such as Sempervivum 'Pekinese', S. arachnoideum (cobweb houseleek), and S. tectorum (common houseleek), as well as members of the related genus Jovibarba. The name is also used for some species of Echeveria, Sedum and Bergenia although these plants differ significantly from Sempervivum and Jovibarba, and may require different cultivation and care.

== Care ==
Hen and chicks is popular in gardens for its varied appearance and hardiness. It is grown as container planting or in rock gardens. It does best in well-drained, rocky soil; if they are kept wet, the outer leaves will rot. Planting them in cactus or succulent soil will prevent your plant from sitting in water and dying. Commercial succulent soil is a good choice. Using a pot that allows for drainage at the bottom will also aid in circulating the moisture, and keep the water from sitting at the bottom (this will prevent root rot). Although it does best in sun, it will grow in light shade.

== Medicinal uses ==
The leaves of hens and chicks have been used as herbal remedies for many years. Freshly pressed leaves may act as a substitute to aloe vera for wounds such as low severity burns, sores, and insect bites. Extracts from leaves have been shown to have some antimicrobial and antioxidant properties. Higher levels of antioxidant compounds are produced after long term stressors such as soil drought.

== Gallery ==
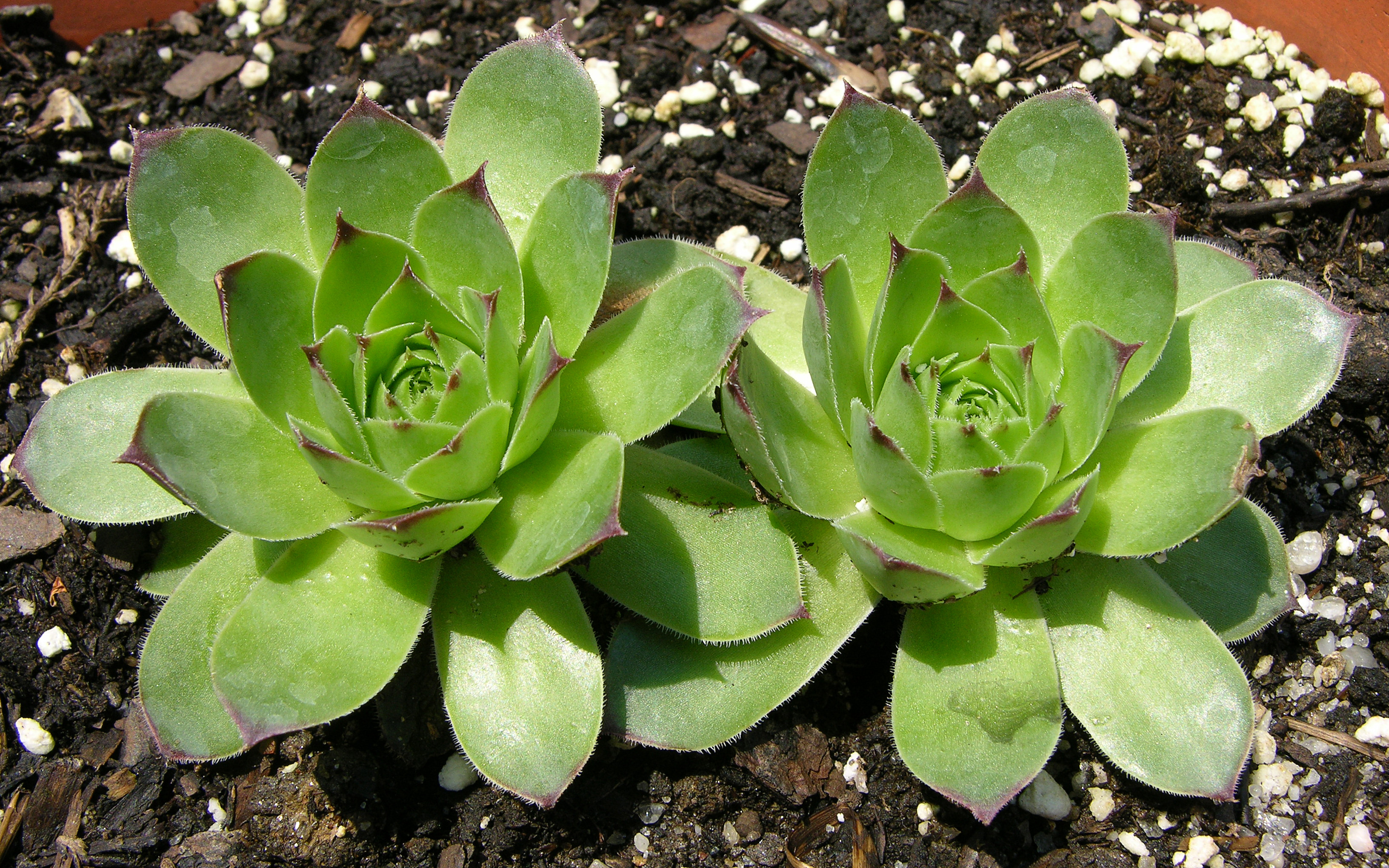
Two hen and chicks

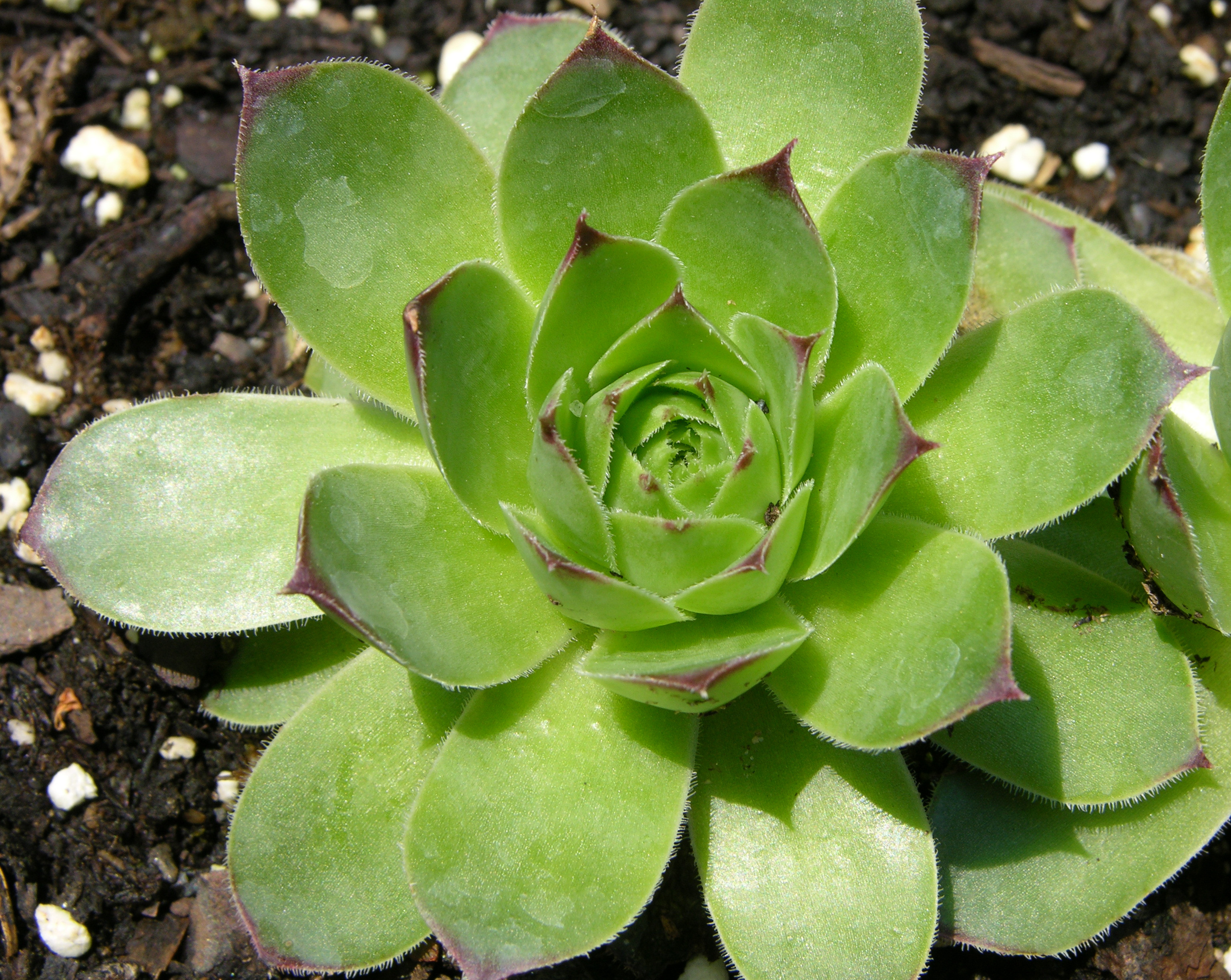
A hen and chicks close up

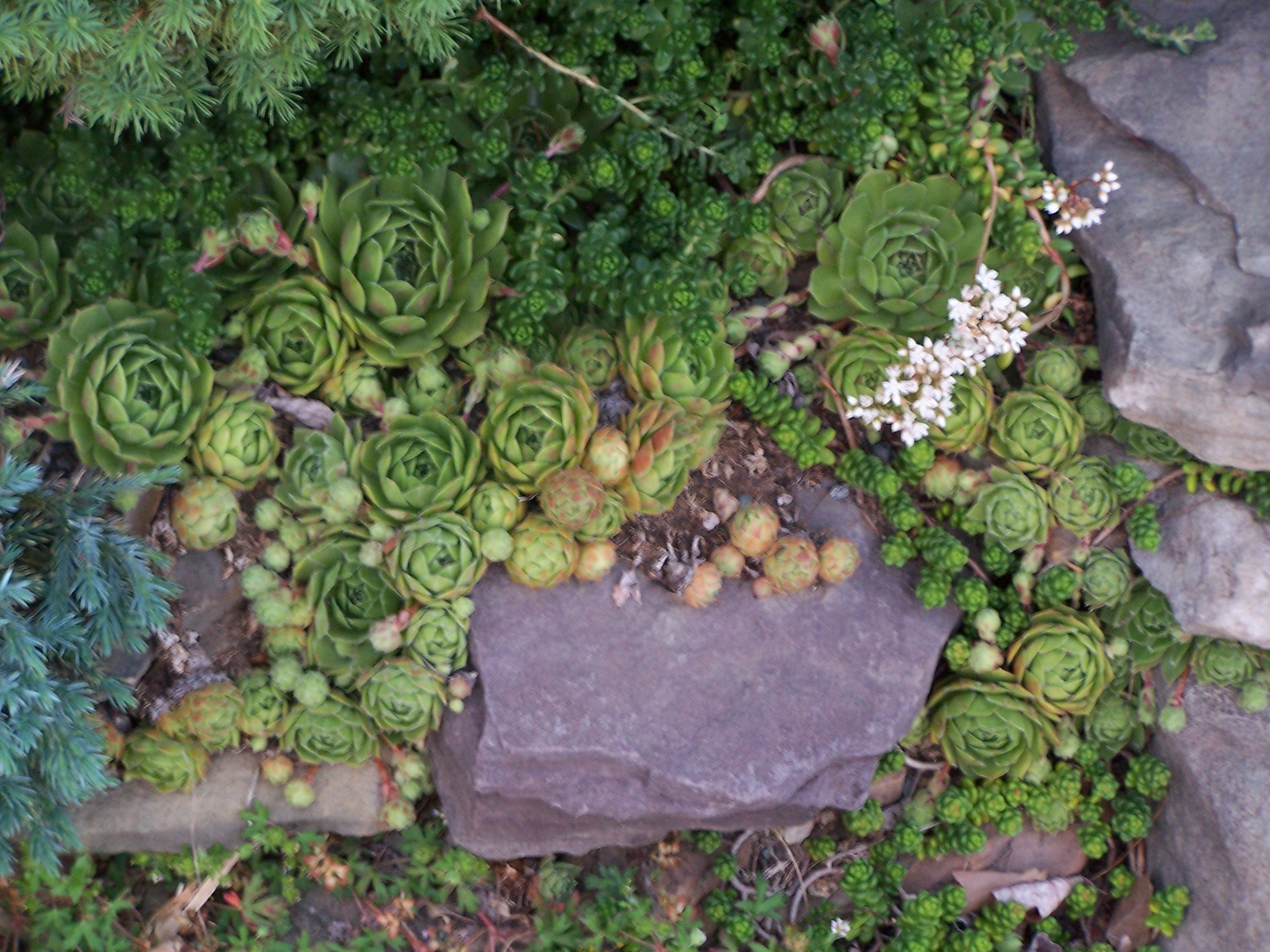
Multiple Hens and chicks alongside sedum

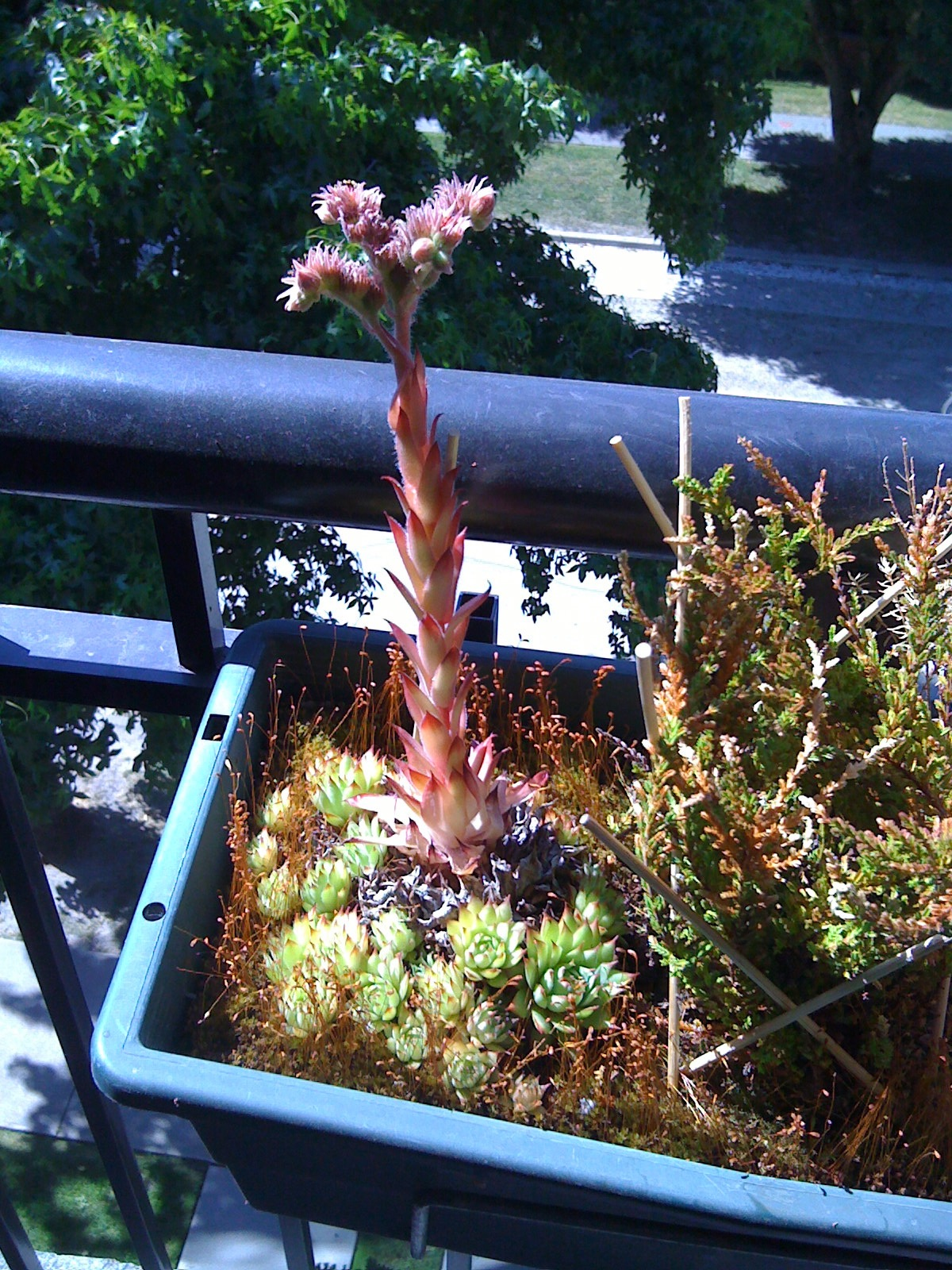
Hens and chicks at maturity, 25 cm stalk

== See also ==
- Hen and chicken plant
- How to Grow Hen & Chicks Succulents
