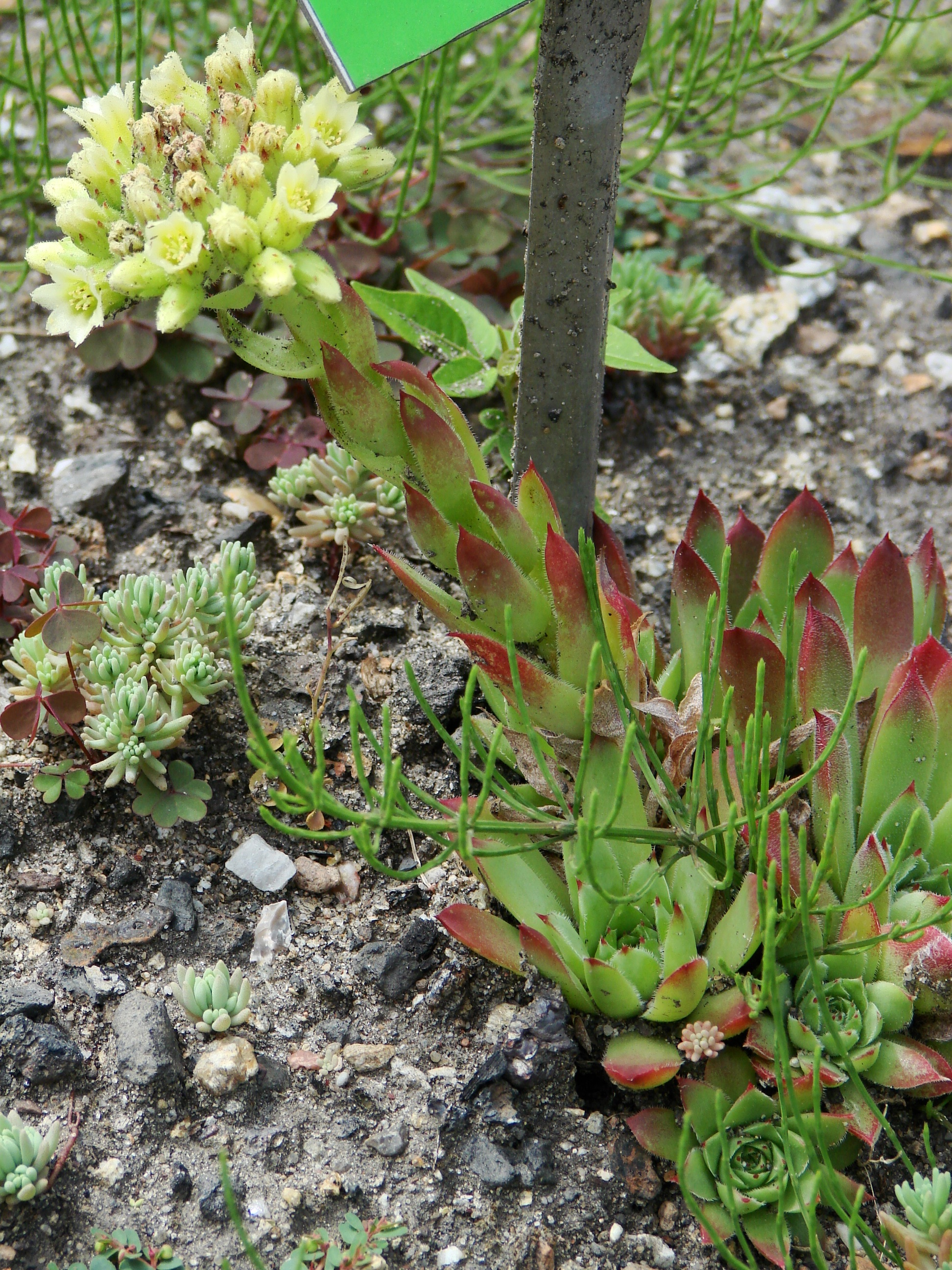
- Jovibarba heuffelii, at a botanical garden in Wroclaw, Poland

Scientific classification
- Kingdom: Plantae
- Clade: Tracheophytes
- Clade: Angiosperms
- Clade: Eudicots
- Order: Saxifragales
- Family: Crassulaceae
- Genus: Jovibarba
- Species: J. heuffelii

Binomial name
- Jovibarba heuffelii (Schott) Á. Löve & D. Löve

Synonyms
- Sempervivum heuffelii Schott

= Jovibarba heuffelii =

Species of succulent

Jovibarba heuffelii, common name hen-and-chickens, is a plant species native to the Balkans and to the Carpathians in Europe but reportedly naturalized in Wisconsin and probably in other parts of North America. It grows on rocky outcrops.

Jovibarba heuffelii is a perennial herb forming basal rosettes of succulent leaves that are ciliate along the margins. Flowering stalks are erect, succulent, up to 20 cm (8 inches) tall, bearing a cyme of up to 40 white to yellowish flowers. Each flower is up to 5 cm (2 inches) in diameter, with 6-7 fringed petals. Each plant is semelparous, meaning that it flowers only once, dying after its fruits mature.

Some botanists treat the genus Jovibarba as part of the genus Sempervivum, but the Flora of North America separates it into its genus.
