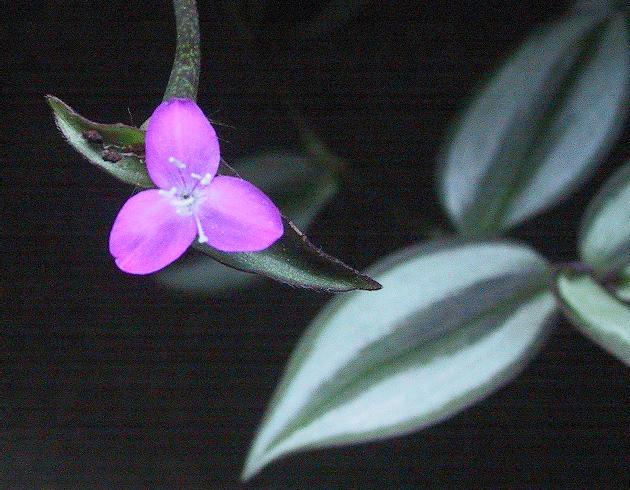

Scientific classification
- Kingdom: Plantae
- Clade: Tracheophytes
- Clade: Angiosperms
- Clade: Monocots
- Clade: Commelinids
- Order: Commelinales
- Family: Commelinaceae
- Genus: Tradescantia
- Species: T. zebrina

Binomial name
- Tradescantia zebrina (Schinz) D. R. Hunt

Synonyms
- Tradescantia pendula Zebrina pendula Zebrina pendula var. quadrifolia

= Tradescantia zebrina =

Species of flowering plant

Tradescantia zebrina, formerly known as Zebrina pendula, is a species of creeping plant in the Tradescantia genus. Common names include silver inch plant and wandering Jew. The latter name is controversial, and some now use the alternative wandering dude. The plant is popular in cultivation due to its fast growth and attractive foliage. It is used as a groundcover in warm winter climates, and as a houseplant elsewhere.

== Description ==
Tradescantia zebrina has attractive zebra-patterned leaves, the upper surface showing purple new growth and green older growth parallel to the central axis, as well as two broad silver-colored stripes on the outer edges, with the lower leaf surface presenting a deep uniform magenta. The leaves are bluish green and usually have two longitudinal stripes that are silvery on the surface and purple on the underside. When chronically exposed to long periods of intense sunlight, the variegation fades and the leaf becomes purple throughout.

The leaf sheaths are thin and translucent, 8 to 12 mm long and 5 to 8 mm wide, at the mouth they are long, otherwise glabrous or slightly hairy.

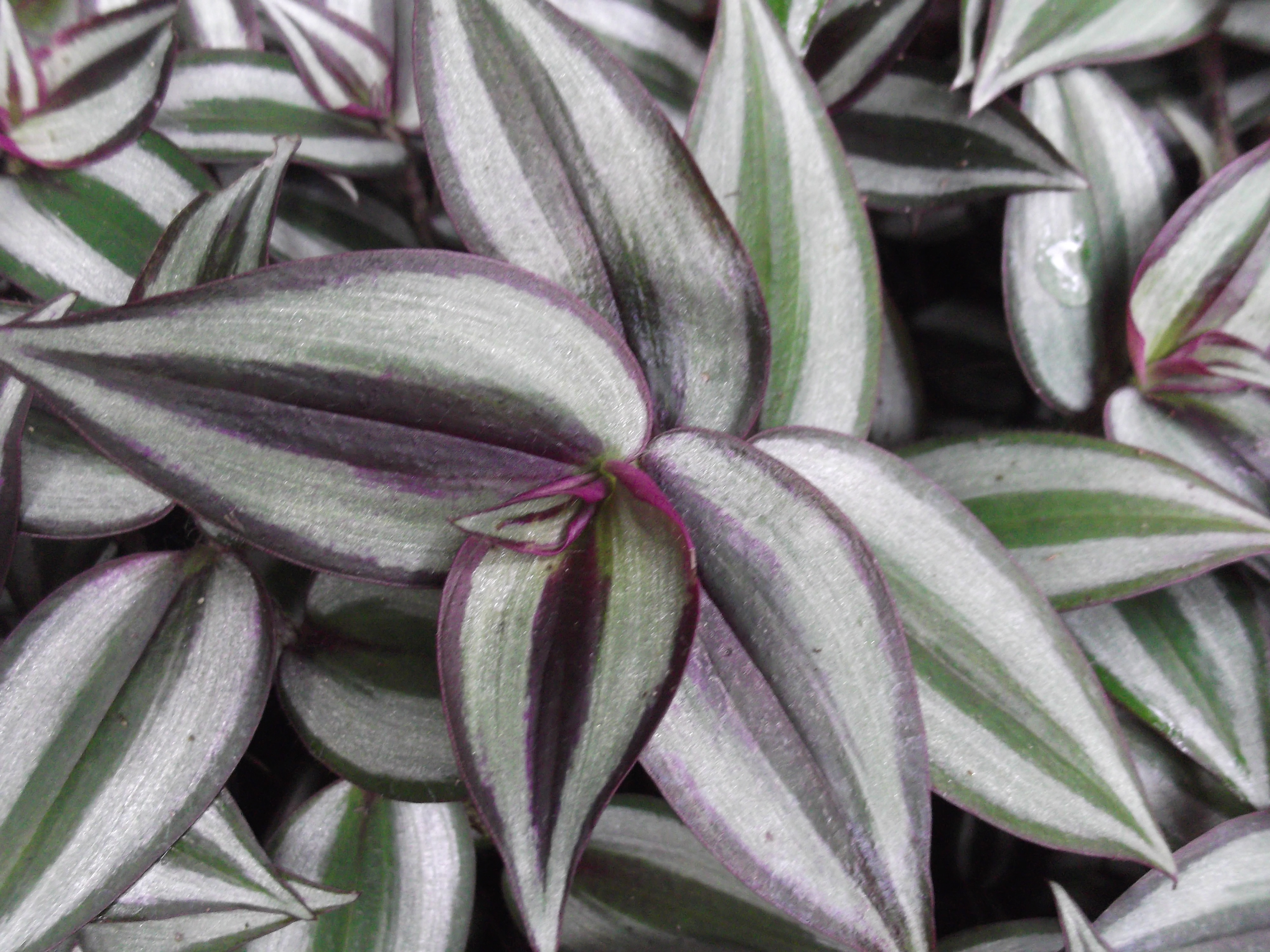
Tradescantia zebrina leaves

The low-lying, slightly succulent, perennial, herbaceous plant often forms dense mats or colonies. This is done primarily by natural formation of taproots. On the nodules of the shoot are root approaches, from which roots develop in permanent contact with water or a sufficiently moist substrate under favorable conditions within a day. The shoots are glabrous or hairy. The stalked, parallel-veined leaves are mostly ovate, 4 to 10 cm long and 1.5 to 3 cm wide, pointed towards the tip, rounded to the base. The upper surface is glabrous to mildly hairy, the underside hairless to averagely hairy, ciliate towards the leaf base. The structure of the flower—usually from the three pink petals and the white sexual organs—is similar to that of the other Tradescantia, but unlike what happens in those, the plant branches off thanks to new buds whose attachment starts below that of the leaf (and not above).

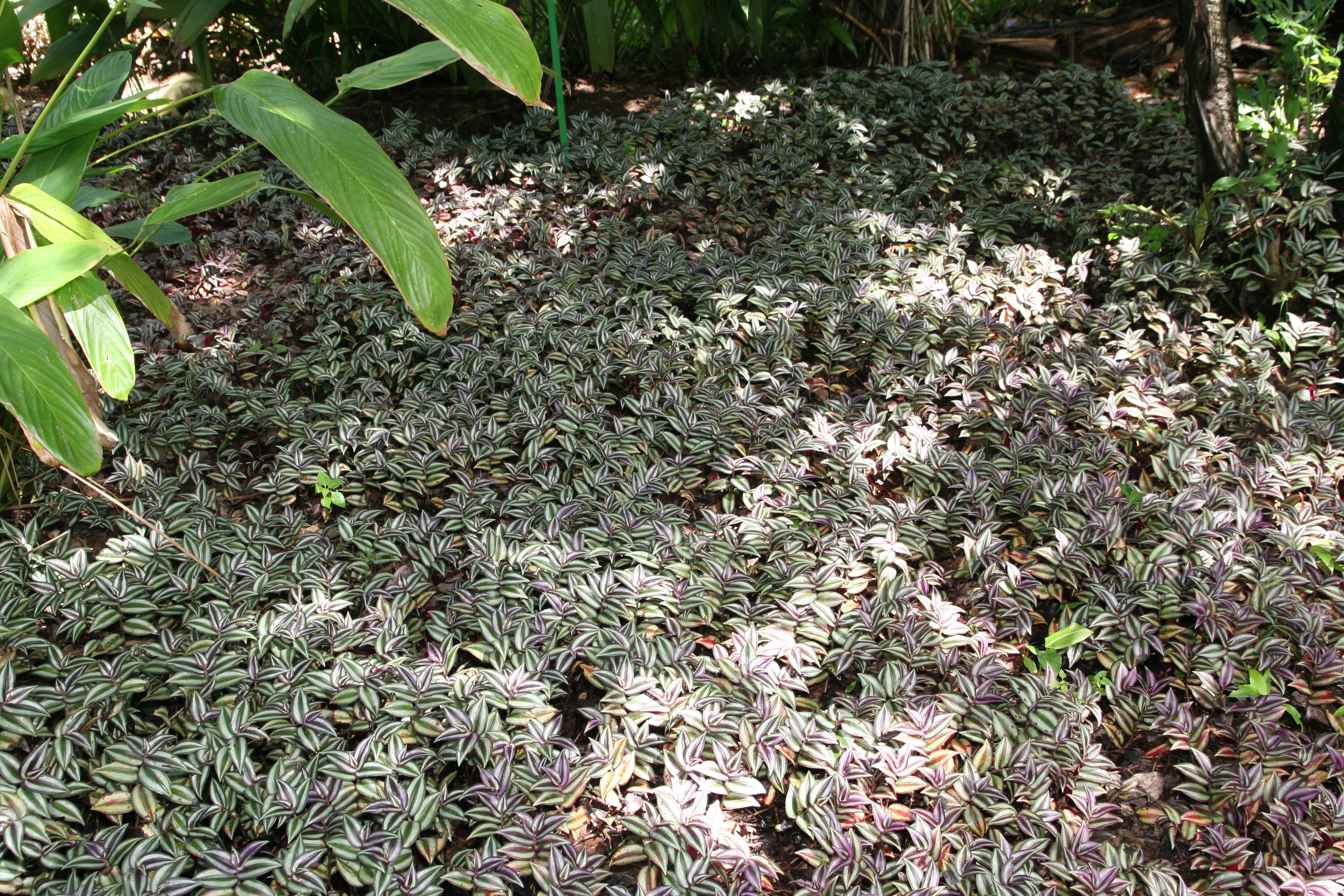
A dense mat of Tradescantia zebrina

The flowers are in groups, supported by two large foliage-like, narrow, ciliate bracts. The hermaphrodite, radial-symmetrical flowers are threefold. The three overgrown sepals are 2 to 3 mm long. The three only grown at the base petals are ovate-blunt, pink to purple and 5 to 9 mm long. The six equally sized stamens are violet hairy. Three carpels have become a top permanent ovary grown. They form capsule fruits that contain gray-brown seeds.

Skin irritation may result from repeated contact with or prolonged handling of the plant—particularly from the clear, watery sap (a characteristic unique to T. zebrina as compared with the other aforementioned types).

== Habitat ==
Tradescantia zebrina is native to Mexico, Central America, and Colombia, but can also be found on the Caribbean islands. It is naturalized in parts of Asia, Africa, Australia, South America, and various oceanic islands.

The plant grows in thickets in the wetland and rainforest, often on stones in shady and open areas or on river banks at altitudes of 2,000 meters (6,600 ft) or below, but mainly at lower altitudes.

== Cultivation ==
It is commonly available and used as a houseplant and groundcover, aggressively colonizing new areas when left undisturbed. Propagated by cuttings, this plant can be moved or manipulated easily as its runners cling lightly to the ground (if used as cover). It tends to become an invasive species if not properly maintained. The plant is not frost-resistant but can be kept indoors during the winter months in colder climates. It is hardy in USDA hardiness zones 9, 10 and 11.

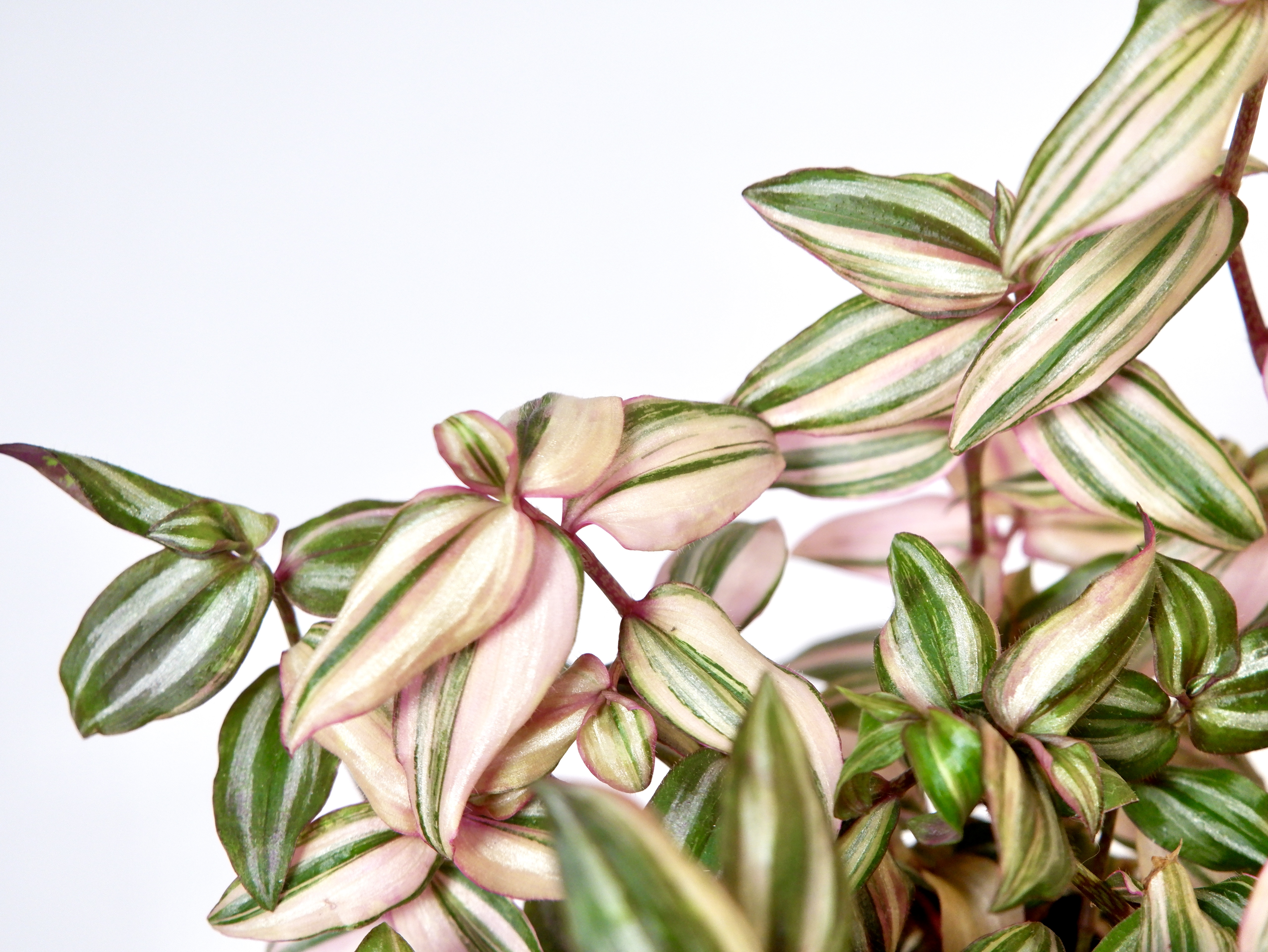
Variegated cultivar, Tradescantia zebrina 'Danny Lee'

The species, and the cultivars 'Purpusii' and 'Quadricolor' have gained the Royal Horticultural Society's Award of Garden Merit.

== Invasiveness ==
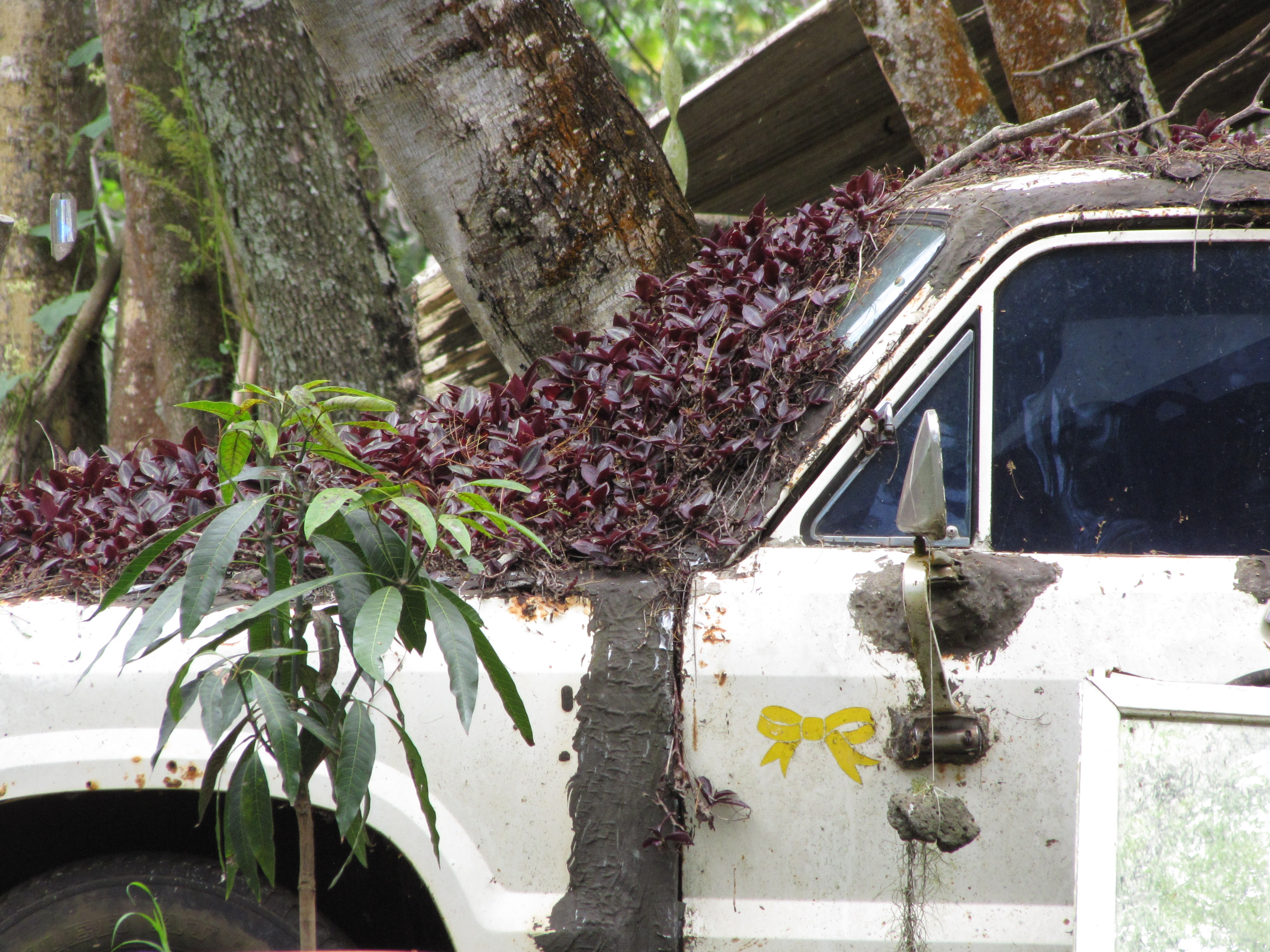
Tradescantia zebrina engulfing a truck

It is classified as a Category 1b Invasive Species in South Africa, and thus may no longer be planted or propagated. All trade in seeds, cuttings or other propagative material is prohibited. It may not be transported or be allowed to disperse, either in rural or urban areas. It is also an invasive species in the Galápagos Islands.

== Phytochemistry ==
In regions such as Latin America and Asia, the leaves of Tradescantia zebrina are traditionally consumed as herbal teas or medicinal decoctions. Phytochemical analyses indicate the leaves contain bioactive compounds, primarily phenolic acids, flavonoids, and anthocyanins. In vitro studies demonstrate that aqueous extracts possess antioxidant and anti-inflammatory properties, including the ability to scavenge free radicals, hydrogen peroxide, and nitric oxide.

However, research using simulated gastrointestinal digestion models reveals that these phenolic and flavonoid compounds are chemically unstable. During digestion, they degrade significantly, causing a severe reduction in antioxidant and anti-inflammatory capacity. Due to this poor bioaccessibility, exploiting T. zebrina as an oral functional food ingredient requires protective delivery systems, such as microencapsulation, to preserve the compounds during gastrointestinal transit.

== Varieties ==
- Tradescantia zebrina var. flocculosa (G.Brückn.) D.R.Hunt – tropical Mexico, Guatemala, Honduras
- Tradescantia zebrina var. mollipila D.R.Hunt – tropical Mexico
- Tradescantia zebrina var. zebrina – most of Mexico from north to south, Central America, Colombia
