= Hen and chicken plant =

Hen and chicken is a common name for several unrelated groups of plants. The name refers to the tendency of certain of these species to reproduce vegetatively by means of plantlets. These tiny plants are produced by the mother plant, and take root on touching the ground.

The name may refer to:

- Chlorophytum comosum, the commonly cultivated houseplant
- Sempervivum & Jovibarba, two related genera of small succulent plant species, commonly called "Hen and chicks"
- Echeveria, a genus of succulent plant species
- Sedum, a genus of succulent plant species
- Bergenia, a non-succulent Asian plant genus
- Asplenium bulbiferum, the "hen and chicken fern" of New Zealand
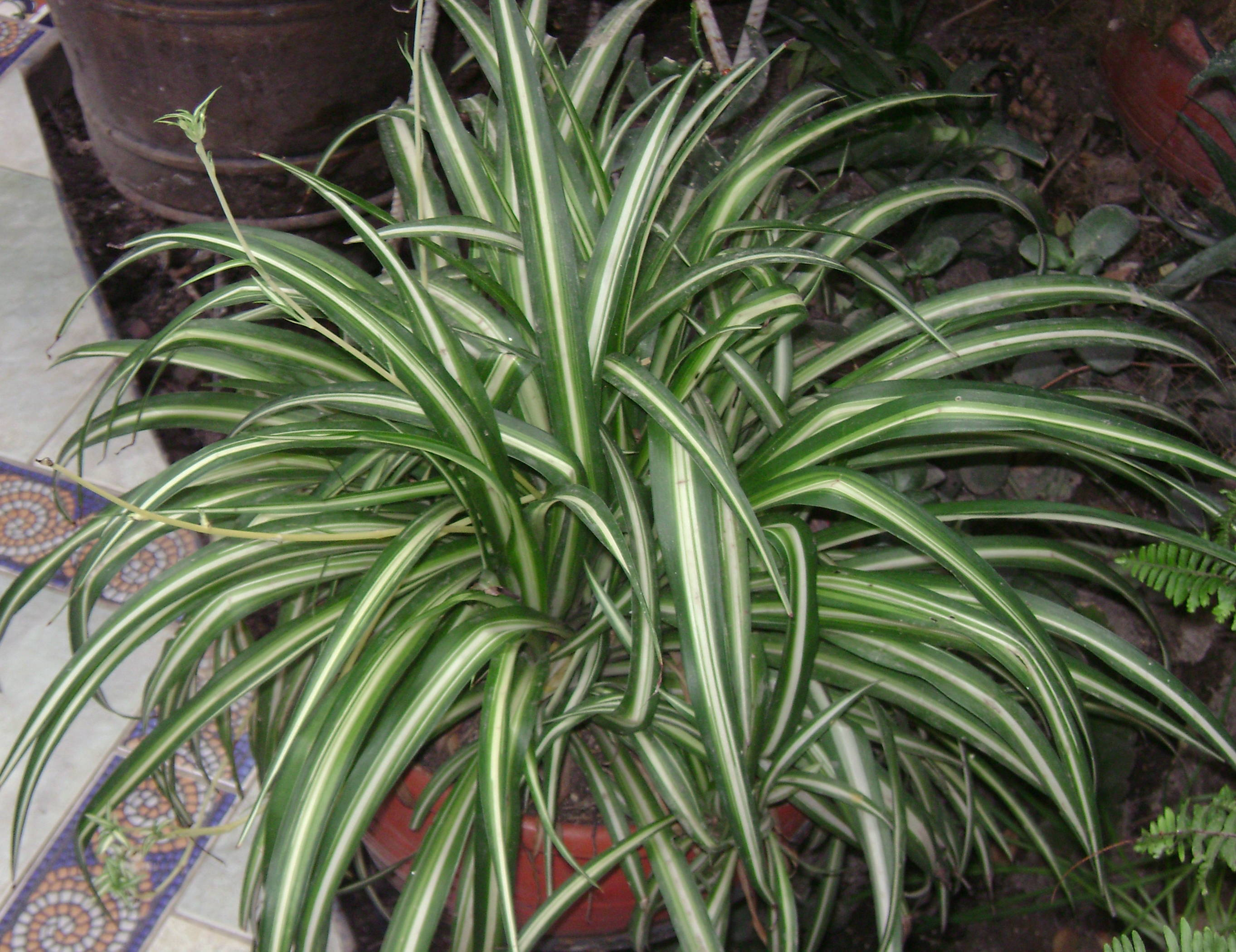
Chlorophytum comosum

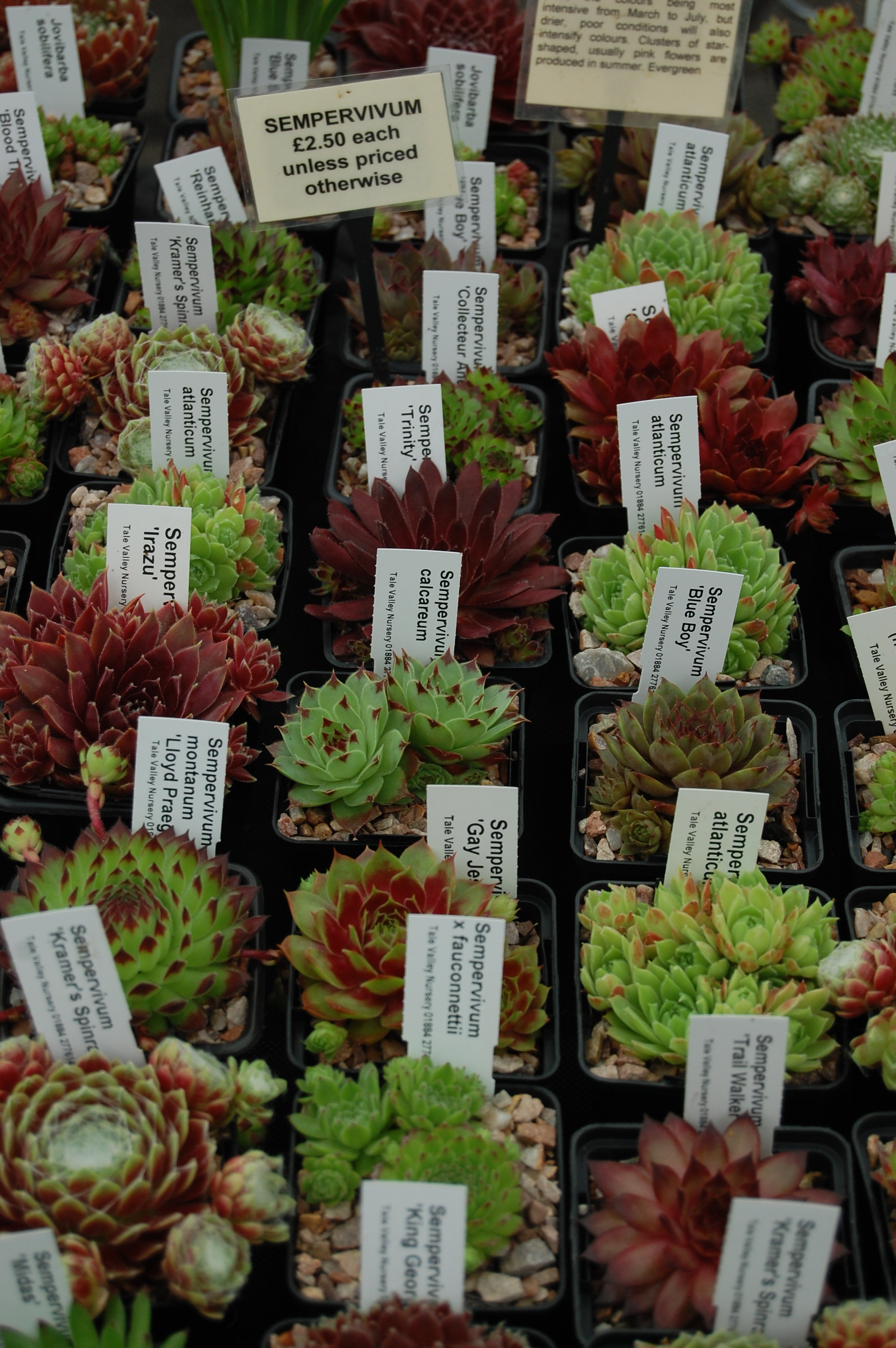
Genus Sempervivum: a selection of specimens

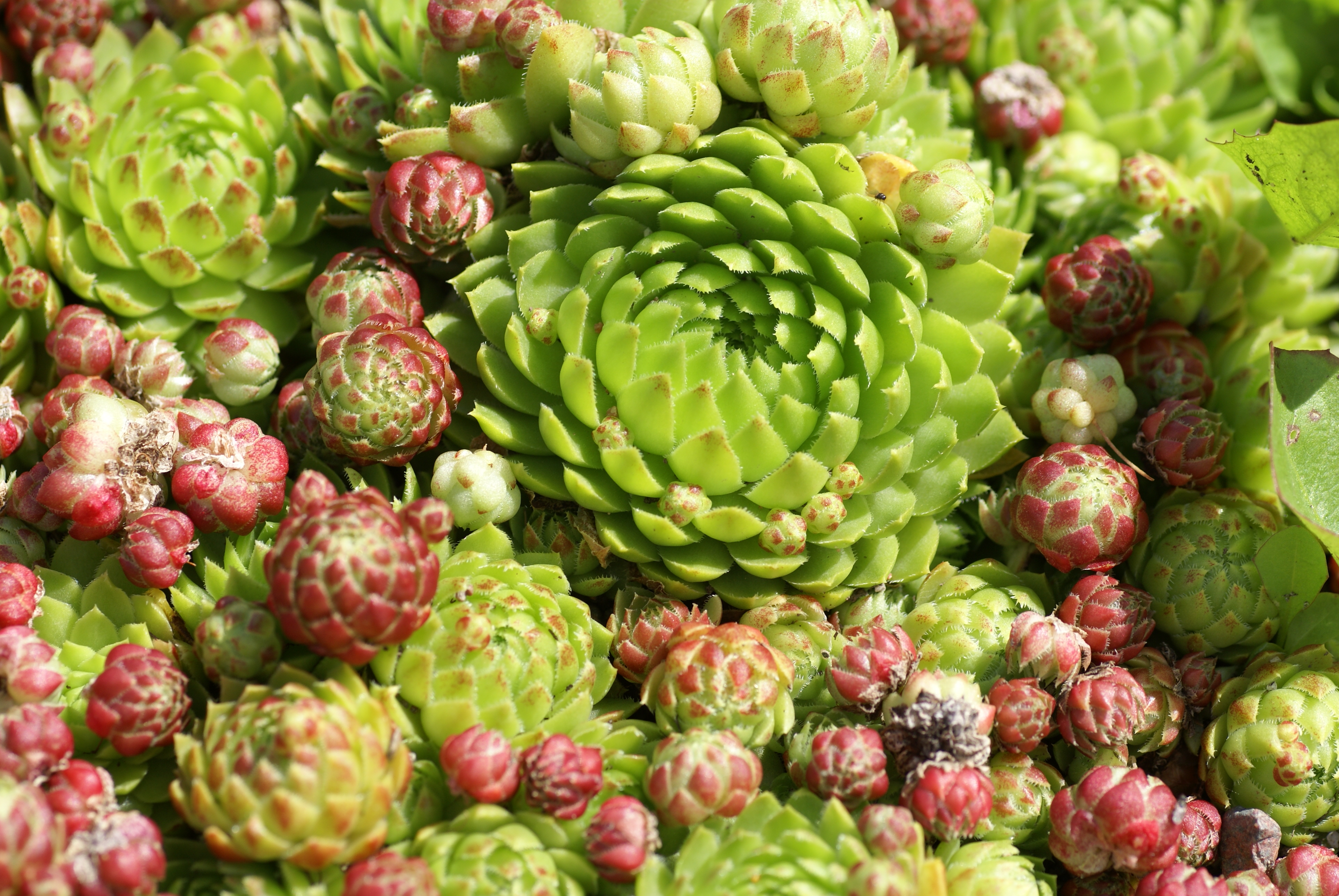
Jovibarba ("Jupiter's beard"). A related genus.

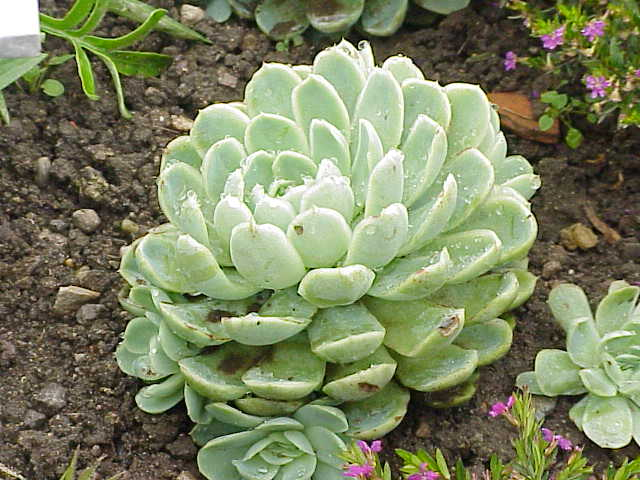
Echeveria elegans

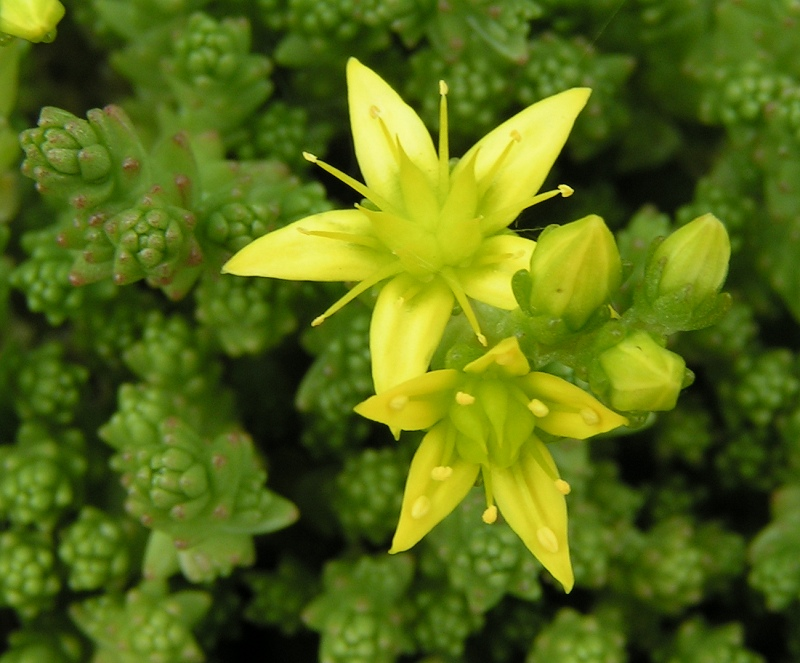
Sedum ("Stonecrop")

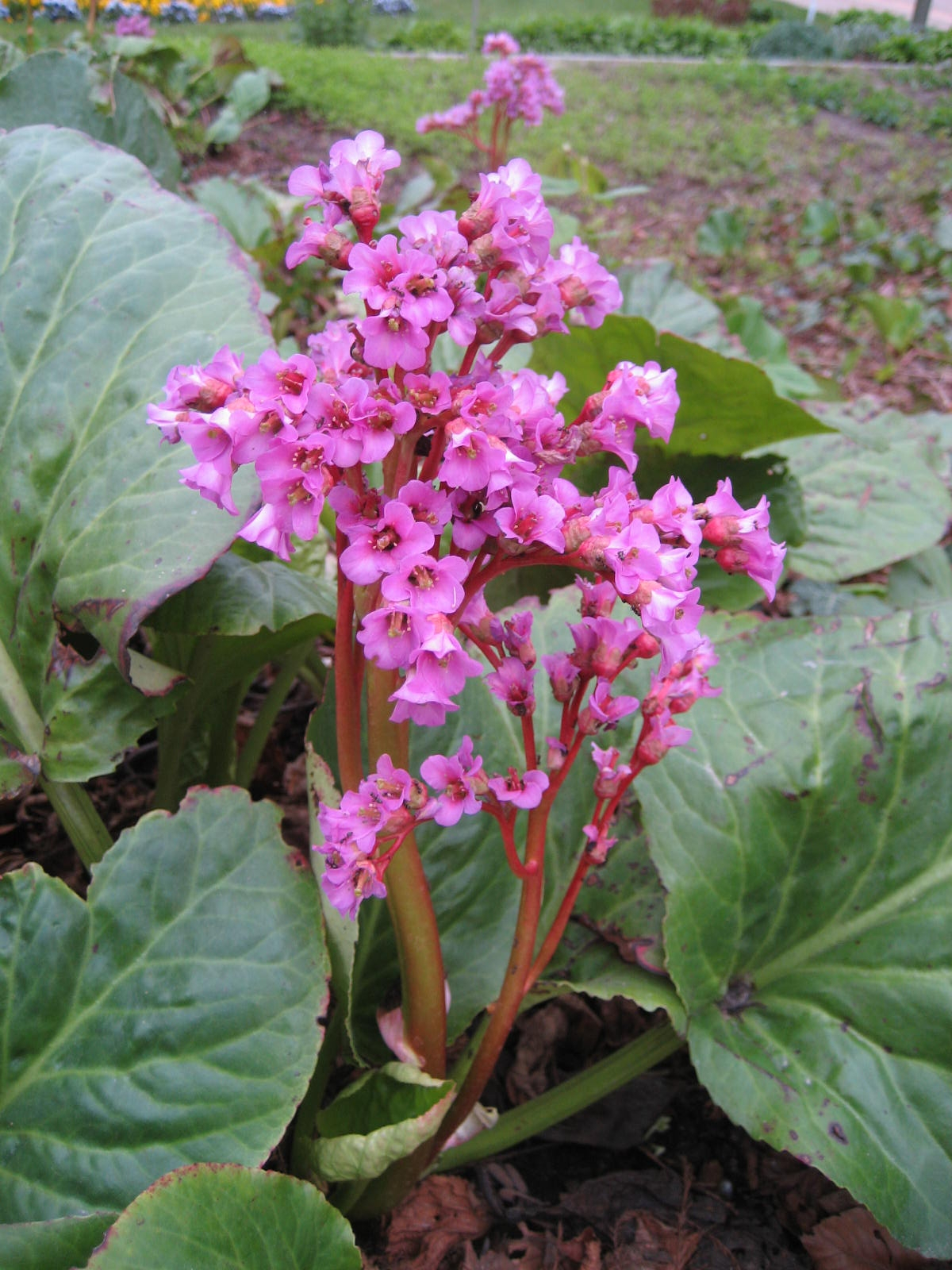
Bergenia cordifolia

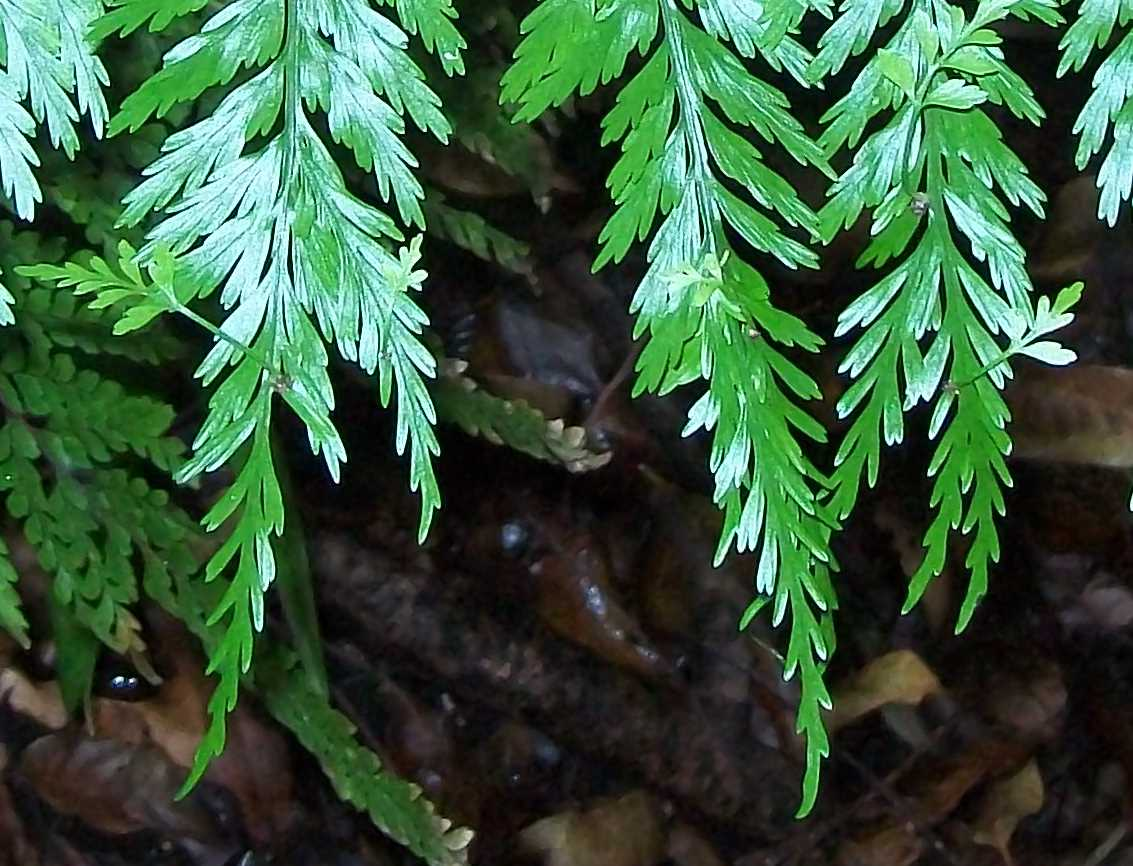
Asplenium bulbiferum

== See also ==
Hen and chicks
