= Offset (botany) =

Daughter plant asexually produced on the mother plant

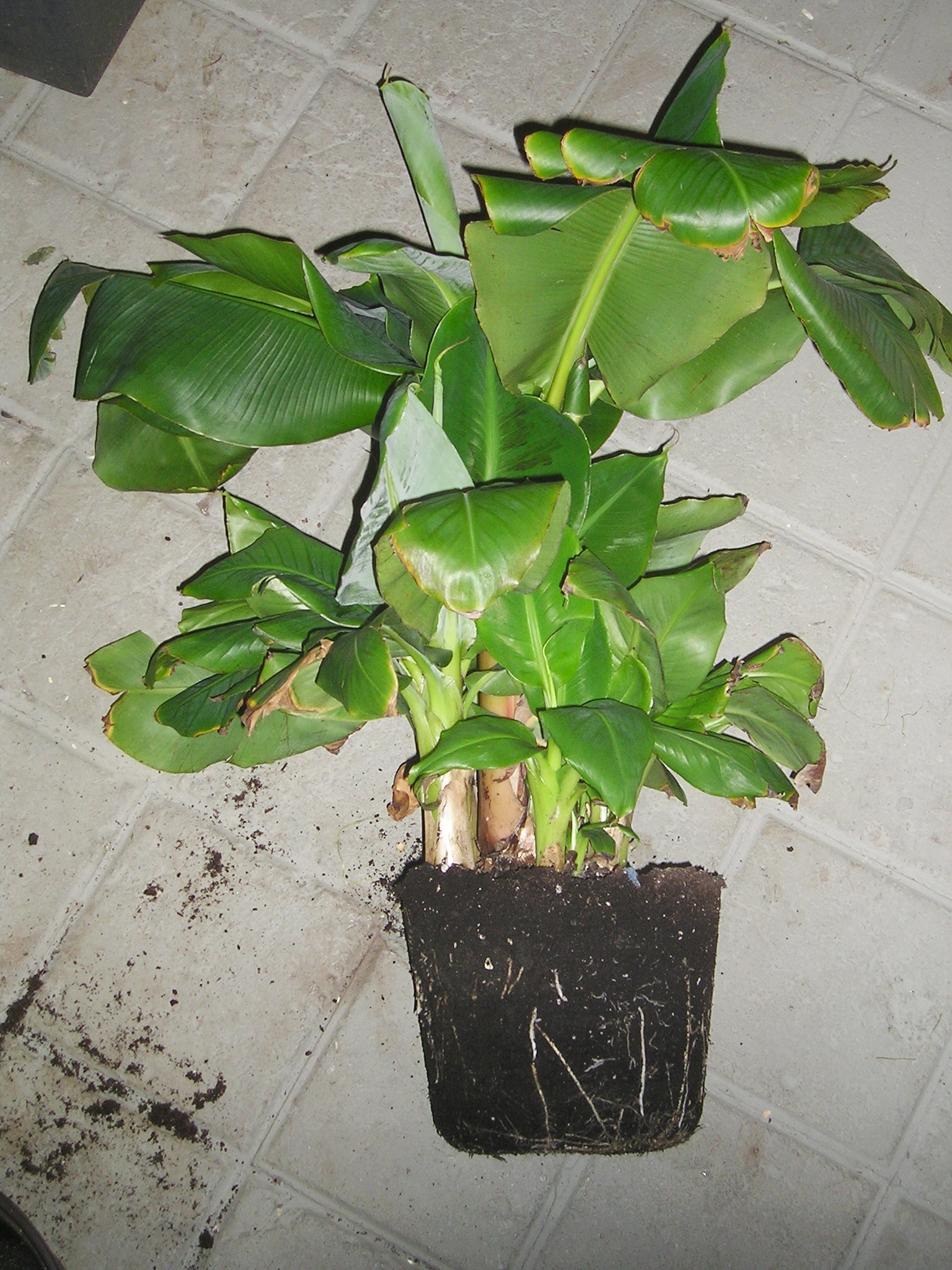
Offsets from a banana plant

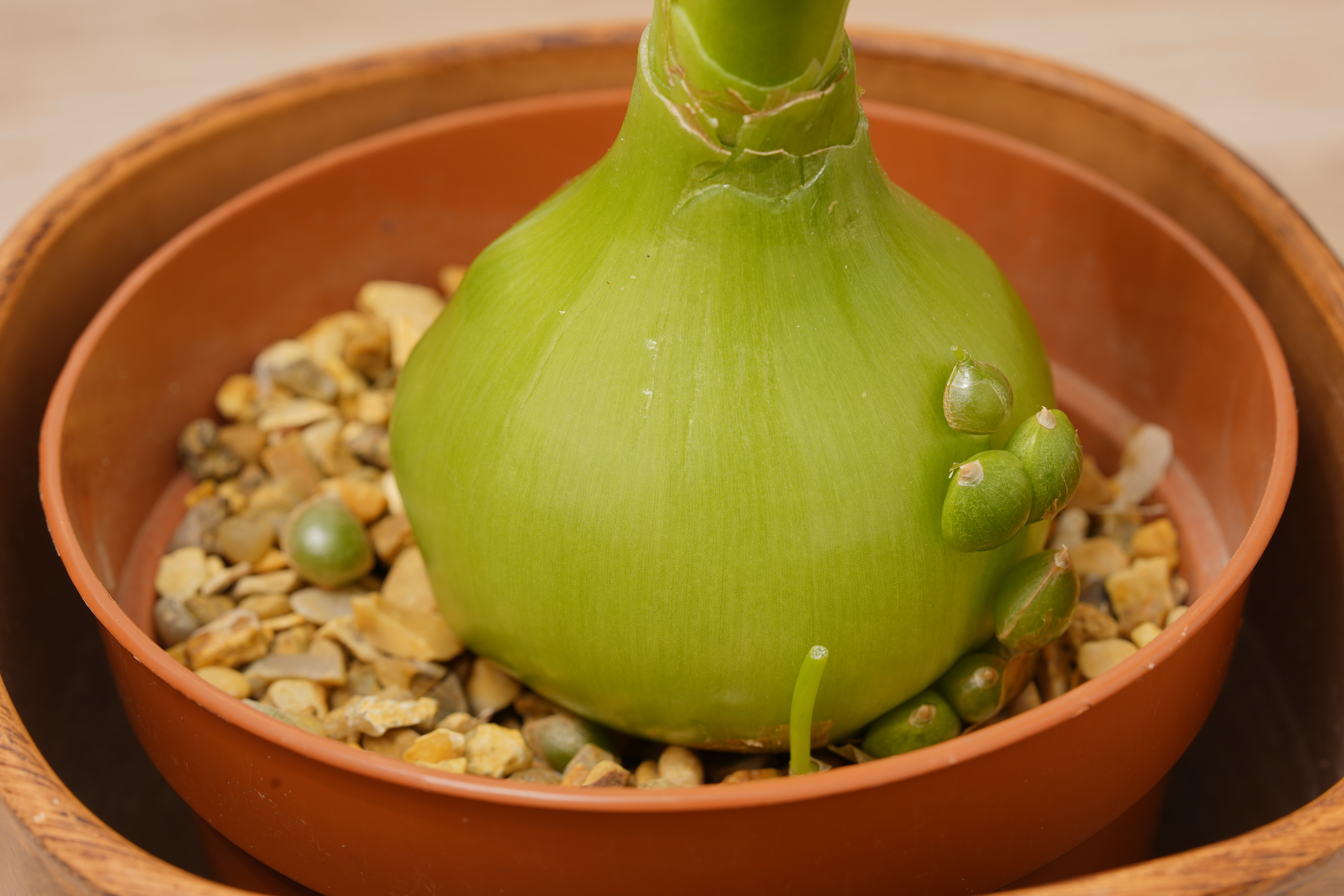
Bulblets on the side of Albuca bracteata

In botany and horticulture, an offset (also called a pup, mainly in the US,) is a small, virtually complete daughter plant that has been naturally and asexually produced on the mother plant. They are clones, meaning that they are genetically identical to the mother plant. They can divide mitotically. In the plant nursery business and gardens, they are detached and grown in order to produce new plants. This is a cheap and simple process for those plants that readily produce offsets as it does not usually require specialist materials and equipment.

An offset or 'pup' may also be used as a broad term to refer to any short shoot originating from the ground at the base of another shoot. The term 'sucker' has also been used as well, especially for bromeliads, which can be short lived plants and when the parent plant has flowered, they signal the root nodes to form new plants.

Offsets form when meristem regions of plants, such as axillary buds or homologous structures, differentiate into a new plant with the ability to become self-sustaining. This is particularly common in species that develop underground storage organs, such as bulbs, corms and tubers. Tulips and lilies are examples of plants that display offset characteristics by forming cormlets around the original mother corm. In the UK, the term 'bulbils' is used for lilies. It can take up to 3 years for the bulbil to store enough energy to produce a flower stem. although larger bulbs (such as Cardiocrinum giganteum) may take 5 to 7 years before flowering.

It is a means of plant propagation. When propagating plants to increase a stock of a cultivar, thus seeking identical copies of parent plant, various cloning techniques (asexual reproduction) are used. Offsets are a natural means by which plants may be cloned.

In contrast, when propagating plants to create new cultivars, sexual reproduction through pollination is used to create seeds. The recombination of genes gives rise to offspring plants with similar but distinct offspring genome.
